= Ugrin Csák (archbishop of Kalocsa) =

Hungarian prelate and military leader

- Archbishop of Kalocsa
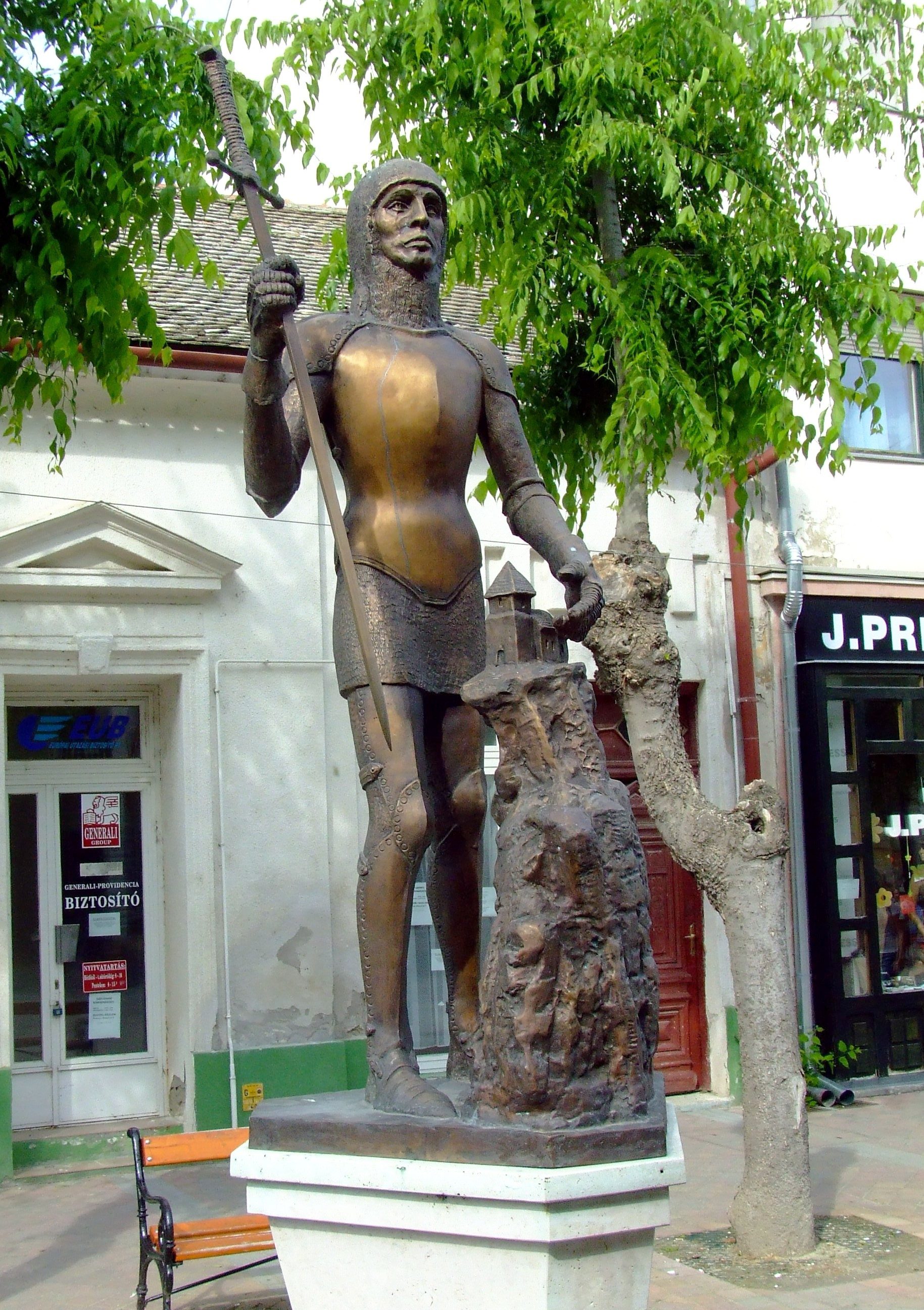
- Sculpture of Ugrin Csák in Kalocsa by Csilla Halassy (2000)
- Installed: 1219
- Term ended: 11 April 1241
- Predecessor: Berthold of Merania
- Successor: Benedict
- Other post: Chancellor

Orders
- Consecration: June 1219 by Pope Honorius III

Personal details
- Born: c. 1190
- Died: 11 April 1241 Battle of Mohi
- Denomination: Catholic
- Parents: Bás (I)
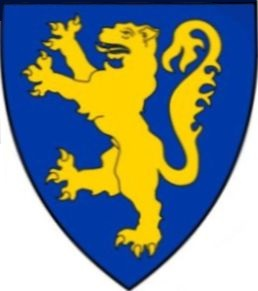
- Coat of arms

Ugrin from the kindred Csák (Hungarian: Csák nembeli Ugrin; c. 1190 – 11 April 1241) was a Hungarian prelate and military leader in the first half of the 13th century, who served as Archbishop of Kalocsa from 1219 until his death at the Battle of Mohi (Sajó River) on 11 April 1241. He was also chancellor of the royal court from 1217 to 1219 and from 1230 to 1235.

== Family ==
Among the major ecclesiastics these fell [in the Battle of Mohi]: [...] Archbishop Ugolin of Kalocsa, scion of a most noble line, who, setting aside minor matters was in charge of great and pressing secular business; it was in him that the Hungarian nobles had confidence and it was to him that both the great and less great men humbly gave their devotion; [...]

— Master Roger's Epistle to the Sorrowful Lament upon the Destruction of the Kingdom of Hungary by the Tatars

Ugrin (I) (also known as Ugolin or Hugolin) was born into the Újlak branch of the gens Csák as the son of ispán Bás (I). His brothers were Bás (II) and Pós (or Pous), who served as Master of the treasury and Ban of Severin in 1235, and was considered an influential courtier of Duke Béla of Transylvania. The Csák clan was one of the most ancient and powerful kindreds in Hungary. According to the Gesta Hunnorum et Hungarorum ("Deeds of the Huns and Hungarians"), the ancestor of the kindred was Szabolcs, son of chieftain Előd, the leader of one of the seven Magyar tribes, who participated in the Hungarian conquest of the Carpathian Basin in the late 9th century.

Due to his influence through his ecclesiastical career, Ugrin was a prominent patron of his branch within the Csák kindred. His namesake nephew (possibly son of Bás II) studied at the University of Paris, where he spent twelve years and his theologian studies was financially funded by his uncle Ugrin. Later, this Ugrin (II) served as Archbishop of Split from 1244 to 1248. Another namesake nephew was the son of Pós, who died by 1240. In that year, his minor sons (Ugrin III and other unidentified one[s]) and their cousin Csák (another son of Bás II) were involved in a lawsuit against the St. Michael church in Vas County. During the case, the children were represented by Demetrius Csák from the clan's Ugod branch and their uncle, Archbishop Ugrin. By the end of the 13th century, Ugrin (III) became one of the most powerful oligarchs in the Kingdom of Hungary.

== Chancellor ==
Ugrin is first mentioned by contemporary records in 1217, when he was appointed chancellor of the royal court of Andrew II. Under his tenure, the structure of royal diplomas has undergone a significant change. The charters had a full promulgatio and corroboratio thereafter, while the section arenga usually emphasized King Andrew's reform policy, the so-called "new institutions". This was the most significant chancellery reform since the reign of Béla III of Hungary. His role as royal chancellor in the first time is also unique, as he had no known ecclesiastical position (stallum) simultaneously.

As royal chancellor, Ugrin participated in the Fifth Crusade, where accompanied Andrew II to the Holy Land in the second half of 1217. During their journey to Zagreb, the local bishop Stephen and the cathedral chapter requested Andrew to confirm their privileges. Upon the order of the king, Ugrin read out and transcribe the former letters of royal donation and the monarch confirmed those thereafter. The majority of the Hungarian contingent, including Ugrin, returned to home in early 1218. Ugrin held the office of chancellor until 1219, when he was elected Archbishop of Kalocsa. He was succeeded by Cletus Bél, who continued his chancellery reform.

More than a decade later, Ugrin was made chancellor for the second time in 1230. He held the office until the death of Andrew II in 1235. His activity resulted the return of forms of corroboratio in royal charters.

== Archbishop of Kalocsa ==
=== Ecclesiastical affairs ===
Ugrin Csák was elected Archbishop of Kalocsa in early 1219, succeeding Berthold, who was transferred to the Patriarchate of Aquileia in the previous year. Thereafter, the joint cathedral chapters of Kalocsa and Bács (present-day Bač, Serbia) sent the provost of Hájszentlőrinc and the archdeacon of Bodrog to the Roman Curia in order to request Pope Honorius III to confirm Ugrin's election. The pope, however, initially refused to do that, suggesting further consideration to the canons in his reply letter dated March 1219. The pope also expressed his wish to meet the archbishop-elect in person. Three months later, in June 1219, Honorius confirmed his election and permitted him to wear his pallium. Theologians Augustin Theiner and József Udvardy argued Ugrin himself and some of the canons visited the Holy See, where the archbishop-elect made a good impression on the pope, who then confirmed his election and personally consecrated him as bishop.

He was the last Archbishop of Kalocsa, who impugned the supremacy of the Archdiocese of Esztergom. It is plausible, he raised objection against John, Archbishop of Esztergom in the Roman Curia simultaneously with his confirmation and consecration. Consequently, Pope Honorius rebuked John, because he unduly exercised jurisdiction over royal churches in the Archdiocese of Kalocsa, in violation of the privilege of the newly elected Ugrin Csák. Honorius emphasized in his rescript that "the equal [archbishop] can not have power over the equal [archbishop]". He permitted Ugrin to supervise royal churches located in his archdiocese and collect tithes from their revenues. Despite the pope's favorable decision, Ugrin and his successors could not enforce it; the Hungarian kings even prevented the popes from exerting influence over the operation and income of the royal churches. The strengthening of secular barons soon smoothed out the internal hierarchical conflicts of the Church in the following decades, and Ugrin no longer tried to increase the influence of his archdiocese to the detriment of Esztergom.

It is possible that Ugrin was present in England on 7 July 1220, when Thomas Becket's remains were moved from his first tomb to a shrine, in the recently completed Trinity Chapel. The event was attended by King Henry III, the papal legate Pandulf Verraccio, the Archbishop of Canterbury Stephen Langton and large numbers of dignitaries and magnates secular and ecclesiastical throughout from Europe. Alongside Langton and Guillaume de Joinville, Archbishop of Reims, an unidentified Hungarian archbishop among the guests is referred by Walter of Coventry in his work Memoriale, when described the events. László Solymosi argued this archbishop may have been John, at whose seat in Esztergom there was a provostry erected in the honour of Thomas Becket. Due to John's advanced age, historian Gábor Thoroczkay considers Walter's narration refers to Ugrin Csák of Kalocsa, who was much younger than John. Around 1220 or 1221, Ugrin, alongside other lords and prelates, for instance Nicholas Szák and Bishop Robert of Veszprém, pledged to return to the Holy Land and fight against the Ayyubid Sultanate. Pope Honorius supported their effort, but in the end no new Hungarian contingent was launched to take part in the Fifth Crusade. Honorius instructed Ugrin to protect the family and wealth of Nicholas Szák, who had returned to the Holy Land, on behalf of the Holy See in December 1223. After Frederick II, Holy Roman Emperor and Pope Honorius concluded a peace, where the emperor promised to depart on the crusade by 15 August 1227, the pope sent a letter to Ugrin in January 1226, in which he instructed him to proclaim the crusade and begin recruiting in his province.

Ugrin was also involved in some ecclesiastical affairs in the early years of his archiepiscopal tenure. In 1222, he contested the election of Raynald of Belleville as Bishop of Transylvania due to Raynald's half-blindness, but Honorius refused his complaint. Ugrin judged over various ecclesiastical lawsuits, including the trial between Pannonhalma Abbey and Robert of Veszprém. He also acted an arbiter in the lawsuit between Stephen II, Bishop of Zagreb and the Knights Templar over the land Rassecha in 1230. With the leadership of Ugrin, the Hungarian prelates summoned in the first half of 1223 and persuade Andrew II to forgive his son Duke Béla, and withdraw the order which compelled his son to separate from his wife Maria Laskarina in the previous year. Ugrin also sent a letter to the pope, to inform him truthfully of the complicated matter. Béla fled Hungary, but after the pope's mediation, he was able to return together with his wife in the spring of 1224. The pope authorized Ugrin and his suffragans to supervise the "harmful" royal land grants made by King Andrew II in his ecclesiastical province in August 1225 (he had called him for this before, as early as 1220). When the majority of the cathedral chapter of Várad (present-day Oradea, Romania) elected Benedict Osl as Bishop of Várad in May 1231, his superior Ugrin Csák confirmed his election and consecrated him shortly thereafter. However, Pope Gregory IX contested Benedict's election and supported the candidacy of his subdeacon Primogenitus. The conflict continued in the coming years.

In 1232, Ugrin established a Cistercian abbey in Gotó (or "Honesta Vallis") in Požega County, dedicated to Mary the Virgin. The first monks arrived from Zirc Abbey. In May 1234, Ugrin instructed two conversi (monks originally laity) to administer the hospital and almshouse near Bács, founded by the archbishop himself too. In December 1233, Ugrin merged the revenues of the Hájszentlőrinc Chapter, founded by Queen Anna of Châtillon, into the Archdeaconry of Bodrog, whereas the former's sources of income had dwindled by then, so he had integrated the provostry into the organizational structure of the archdiocese. Pope Gregory IX confirmed Ugrin's decision in May 1234. During his long lasting archiepiscopal reign, Ugrin initiated and conducted the reconstruction of the Kalocsa Cathedral into Romanesque style (the so-called "second cathedral"), on the model of the Notre Dame d'Avesnières in Laval, Mayenne, according to art historian Imre Henszlmann (in contrast, architect Ernő Foerk put the date of the rebuilding to the 1150s).

A significant number of Muslim communities lived in the territory of the Archidocese of Kalocsa. In 1225, Pope Honorius blamed Ugrin of tolerating the violation of the prohibition of the employment of Jews and Muslims in the royal administration in his archdiocese. According to the pope's complaint, Ugrin ignored the fact that many Muslims possessed Christian slaves and maintained family and business relations from the Muslim world. During the conclusion of the Oath of Bereg (August 1233), papal legate James of Pecorara instructed Ugrin and four other Hungarian prelates, whose dioceses were inhabited by a significant number of Muslim or Jewish communities, to separate those people from Christian settlements and ensure the permanence of segregation during their annual cruises. Upon Andrew's request, Pope Gregory IX allowed the investigation of the separation of non-Christians to take place once every two years after 1235.

=== Bosnian Crusade ===
Ugrin's archiepiscopal activity extended considerably to the case of Christians declared heretics in the Banate of Bosnia. Already in the early 13th century, the Hungarians turned to Rome, complaining to Pope Innocent III that the Bosnian Church was a centre of heresy, based on the refuge that some Cathars (also known as Bogomils or Patarenes) had found there. A papal legate Acontius of Viterbo was to deal with pirates from Omiš who attacked crusaders and pilgrimages on their way to the Holy Land. Residing in Dalmatia, he informed the growing influence of heretics over Bosnia in 1221. In response, Pope Honorius launched a crusade against the Bosnian Church in December 1221. Instead of King Andrew, Ugrin Csák was appointed as leader of the crusade. The Hungarian king placed the provinces of Bosnia, Ozora (Usora) and Só (Soli) under the suzerainty of the Archdiocese of Kalocsa in order to support Ugrin's efforts against the heretics. According to two papal letters from May 1225, Ugrin achieved significant success in the fight against heretics. The pope confirmed Andrew's donations in those documents. According to historians Dominik Mandić and Ivan Majnarić, Acontius and Ugrin summoned a large crusader army and attacked Bosnia, whose defense rushed unprepared for war and suffered heavy losses in the period between 1221 and 1222. The crusaders have succeeded in conquering much of the country and thousands of infidels have been deported to southern Hungary. However there is no source of a large-scale war actually happened between 1221 and 1225, and Acontius' role in Bosnia is hypothetical too.

As a preparation of war against the heretics, Ugrin handed over a wage of 200 marks of silver to John Angelos, a nephew of Andrew II, in order to invade Bosnia on behalf of the Hungarian monarch. Although John took the money but never acted against the Bogomils, despite being reminded of his obligation by Pope Honorius III in 1227. Ugrin intended to establish a permanent military camp along the southern border to launch raids in Bosnia. As a result, he bought the royal fortress of Požega from Andrew II and Duke Béla in exchange for his inherited lordship of Érdsomlyó in Krassó County (present-day Vršac, Serbia) sometime before 1227. Upon the request of Ugrin and the cathedral chapter, Pope Honorius confirmed the attachment of the castle to the Archdiocese of Kalocsa in January 1227. From Požega, Ugrin often launched attacks against the heretics, establishing small forts and outposts along the river Sava. Whether a large-scale crusade took place after 1225 with the leadership of Ugrin, is highly uncertain.

Prior to 1229, Ugrin Csák asked for permission to establish a Roman Catholic diocese in Syrmia in order to facilitate the conversation of Bosnian heretics. It is possible that this effort was inspired by the successes of his rival Archbishop Robert regarding the conversion of Cumans along the eastern border of Hungary. After a report compiled by Raynald of Belleville and Desiderius, Bishop of Csanád, Pope Gregory IX approved the establishment of the Diocese of Syrmia in January 1229. The pope entrusted his chaplain Egidius (or Giles) to consecrate the new bishopric and drew the previously established Greek-rite churches in the territory under its suzerainty. Ugrin selected the abandoned Kő monastery (also known as Bánmonostor, present-day Banoštor, Serbia) – founded by Beloš in the 12th century, where then no order of monks could survive for a long time – as episcopal seat of the newly founded diocese. The estate provided annual income of 300 marks to the bishopric, while Ugrin also intended to hand over 30 marks from his revenues. Ugrin sought to expand the territory of the diocese beyond the river Sava, in Lower Syrmia (later known as Mačva or Macsó). Innocent, the earliest Bishop of Syrmia first appears in contemporary records in 1232. In that year, Pope Gregory commissioned Ugrin to resolve the conflict of jurisdiction between Innocent and the local archdeacon of Syrmia (a member of the cathedral chapter of Bács).

=== Last years ===
Others asserted that these rumors [the Mongol invasion] were spread by some prelates of churches so that they need not go to Rome to the synod called at that time by the Roman pope [Gregory IX]. That was their opinion. However, it was well known to all that Archbishop Ugolin of Kalocsa had ordered galleys in Venice for himself and some of his bishops, but the king called them back from the journey, against their will.

— Master Roger's Epistle to the Sorrowful Lament upon the Destruction of the Kingdom of Hungary by the Tatars

Béla IV ascended the Hungarian throne in 1235. Soon, Ugrin Csák was replaced as chancellor by Matthias Rátót. After the Emperor of Bulgaria, Ivan Asen II and the Emperor of Nicaea, John III Vatatzes, concluded an alliance against the Latin Empire and the rank of patriarch was granted to the head of the Bulgarian Church in token of its autocephaly, Pope Gregory IX sent a letter to Hungarian archbishops Robert and Ugrin Csák in May 1236 to urge them to warn Ivan Asen to refrain himself from the excommunicated John Vatatzes and the "persecution of Latins [i.e. Roman Catholics]". After Béla's ascension, several partisans of the late Andrew II were convicted of "high treason". The monarch complained in his letter sent to Pope Gregory that some of them (including the aforementioned Nicholas Szák) usurped much of the crown revenues and deposited it with local churches. In August 1236, the pope instructed Ugrin to recover these assets in the territory of his archdiocese by warning or threatening the superiors of those churches. When Baldwin II, Latin Emperor traveled to Western Europe in 1236, trying to raise money and soldiers to recover the lost territory of his realm, Pope Gregory instructed Ugrin to cooperate with his envoy Salvio Salvi, Bishop of Perugia to organize the collection of financial aid in Hungary.

By the early 1230s, the case of the heretics in Bosnia was taken over by Duke Coloman, King Béla's younger brother. The duke launched a crusade upon the request of the pope in 1235, but the crusaders succeeded in conquering only peripheral parts of Bosnia. In December 1238, Pope Gregory entrusted Ugrin and other Hungarian prelates to support Ponsa – the local pro-Hungarian Catholic bishop – and his activity in Bosnia. When Duke Coloman intended to unify the Archdiocese of Split with the Diocese of Zagreb, which would have extracted the latter bishopric from the administration of the Hungarian ecclesiastical organization, Pope Gregory reminded him in June 1240, that the two dioceses could not be united without the consent of Ugrin Csák, the archbishop of Kalocsa – superior of the bishop of Zagreb – and the chapters of their sees. Ugrin was commissioned to deliver the pallium to Matthias Rátót, the newly elected Archbishop of Esztergom in March 1240. Pope Gregory summoned a council at Rome to give point to his anathema in his renewing conflict with Emperor Frederick II in early 1241. The Hungarian prelates were also invited to the council. Ugrin already arranged for the trip to the Republic of Venice for himself and his suffragans, when King Béla IV called them back because ominous news began to arrive from the eastern border of the country.

=== Mongol invasion and death ===
Batu [...] began to burn down villages, and his sword did not pardon sex or age, and he hastened as fast as he could against the king. [...] But the king did not allow anyone to go out and engage them [the Mongols]. [...] Archbishop Ugolin of Kalocsa took it badly that they should, like robbers, dishonor so many good people, but bore it even worse that both to him and his men the king seemed to be fainthearted. Therefore, he went out, against the king's order, with a few men and wanted to have battle with them. But they turned their backs and began slowly to retreat. Seeing this, the archbishop spurred on his horse and gave them chase. Eventually, they reached a marshland and they crossed it swiftly. The archbishop did not notice this when he was quite close to them and hastily entered it. Being weighed down by their armor, he and his men could neither cross nor return. But the Tatars turned around quickly, surrounded the marsh and killed them all with a shower of arrows. The archbishop escaped with three or four men and returned embarrassed to the city, quite irate because of the loss of his men and that the king did not send any help to them.

— Master Roger's Epistle to the Sorrowful Lament upon the Destruction of the Kingdom of Hungary by the Tatars

King Coloman then ordered his battle units to arm and proceeded from the camp, followed by Archbishop Ugrinus and his company; for he too was a man of warlike spirit and ready and bold to take arms. So around midnight they came to the bridge; but already a part of the enemy host had crossed over. Seeing them, the Hungarians at once fell upon them. They fought them most bravely and killed a great number of them. [...] Nevertheless, King Coloman, Archbishop Ugrinus and a master of the Order of the Knights Templar [Rembald de Voczon] behaved as proper soldiers should. [...] When a number of their company had been killed the Hungarians retreated to the camp. Ugrinus, being ever outspoken and without fear, raised his voice and began to rebuke the king [Béla IV] for his negligence and to upbraid all the Hungarian barons for their slowness and idleness, remarking that when faced with such peril they had no concern for their own lives or any resolve to defend the country as a whole. So those who were ready went out and joined them. But the others were paralyzed with fear and the unexpected, and as if they had lost their minds had no idea what they should put their hands to or where to turn. The three aforementioned leaders, brooking no further delay, sallied forth again to engage the enemy. Ugrinus launched himself with such daring among the densest ranks of the enemy that they cried aloud and fled from him as if he were a thunderbolt. [...] All the same, they were unable to sustain the overwhelming numbers, and Coloman and the archbishop, both now seriously wounded, made it back to their fellows with difficulty. [...] They were not given the chance to take a different way; pressed on by the Tatars, almost the whole of the Hungarians entered the swamp and were there dragged down into the water and the mud and drowned almost to a man. There perished the most illustrious Ugrinus; there perished Matthias of Esztergom and Bishop Gregory of Győr; there many a prelate and crowd of clerics met their fate.

— Thomas the Archdeacon: History of the Bishops of Salona and Split

The Mongols gathered in the lands bordering Hungary and Poland under the command of Batu Khan in December 1240. They demanded King Béla's submission to their Great Khan Ögödei, but Béla refused to yield and had the mountain passes fortified. The royal army, including the troops of Ugrin Csák, began to gather at Pest. The Mongols, with the assistance of the subjugated Ruthenians, broke through the barricades erected in the Verecke Pass (Veretsky Pass, Ukraine) on 12 March 1241, defeating the army of Palatine Denis Tomaj. Ugrin became one of the chief organizers of the home defence thereafter. A Mongol unit under the leadership of Shiban, Batu's younger brother, arrived the area of Pest by 15 March 1241. They began to plunder the surrounding area (including the sack of Vác), but the king forbade his soldiers to pursue the marauders. Despite that Ugrin defied the royal command, possibly feeling himself "quite experienced and respectable", and gathered his knights to launch a counterattack against the Mongol troops raiding the area. On 17 March 1241, the archbishop's army got stuck in the surrounding swamps during the chase; the light cavalry Mongols surrounded the heavy armored Christian units and they slaughtered them with a shower of arrows. Ugrin narrowly managed to flee the swampland with just a few people.

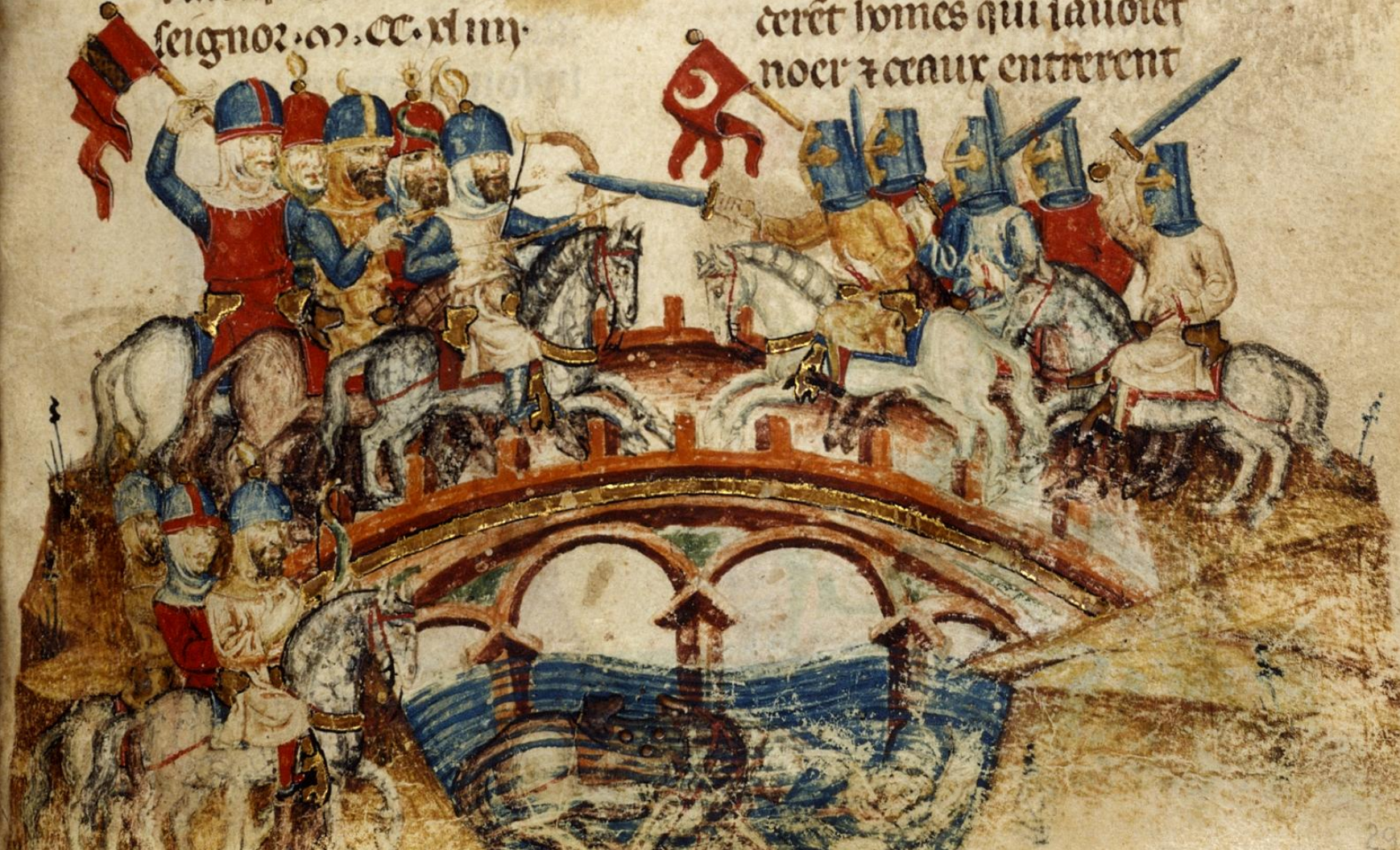
The Battle of Mohi, where Ugrin Csák was killed

The Hungarian army reached the flooded river Sajó in the following days. The cautious king ordered the building of a heavily fortified camp of wagons, a battle-tested countermeasure against nomadic armies. Roger of Torre Maggiore emphasized in his narration Carmen miserabile that Ugrin urged the monarch to march out against the Mongols in force, because they "were day and night burning down villages all around". According to Thomas the Archdeacon, a Ruthenian slave of the Mongols escaped to the Hungarians on 10 April and warned them that the Mongols intended a night attack over the bridge over the Sajó. Duke Coloman, Ugrin Csák and Rembald de Voczon, the master of the Knights Templar in Hungary and Slavonia, gathered their armies and marched to the bridge, arriving there by midnight. They attacked a vanguard of the Mongol army, who began to cross the bridge by then. The rapid onslaught was a resounding success, as most of the enemy were killed or drowned in the river. Coloman and Ugrin returned to the royal camp, leaving behind approximately 1,000 watchmen at the bridge, unaware that the main Mongol army was nearby. Arriving at the camp, they celebrated their victory. However, both Coloman and Ugrin spent the night fully armed, preparing for a possible attack. According to historian János B. Szabó, the chronicler Thomas the Archdeacon arbitrarily emphasizes the courage of Duke Coloman and Ugrin, overemphasizing their role in the battle, while everyone except them turns out to be a coward and want to avoid a clash with the Mongols. The unexpected Hungarian victory forced Batu and the Mongol generals to modify their plans. Shiban was sent north to a ford with a smaller force to cross the river and attack the rear of the bridge-guard. When the fleeing Hungarians arrived at the camp they woke the others. Coloman, Ugrin and Rembald, as Thomas the Archdeacon narrates, then left the camp again to deal with the attackers. Others remained there, believing this was also a minor attack and that Coloman would again be victorious. But as Coloman and Ugrin witnessed the horde of Mongols swell, they realized that this was not a minor raid but an attack by the main Mongol force. After some heavy fighting, they returned to the camp hoping to mobilise the full army. They were badly disappointed, as Béla IV had not even issued orders to prepare for battle. Archbishop Ugrin reproached the King for his faults in public. The main Mongol army crossed the bridge in the morning and an open battle took place. The Hungarian army was virtually annihilated in the Battle of Mohi on the Sajó River on 11 April 1241. A great number of Hungarian lords, prelates and noblemen were killed, including the two archbishops, Ugrin Csák and Matthias Rátót.

== Sources ==
=== Primary sources ===
- Archdeacon Thomas of Split: History of the Bishops of Salona and Split (Latin text by Olga Perić, edited, translated and annotated by Damir Karbić, Mirjana Matijević Sokol and James Ross Sweeney) (2006). CEU Press. ISBN 963-7326-59-6.
- Master Roger's Epistle to the Sorrowful Lament upon the Destruction of the Kingdom of Hungary by the Tatars (Translated and Annotated by János M. Bak and Martyn Rady) (2010). In: Rady, Martyn; Veszprémy, László; Bak, János M. (2010); Anonymus and Master Roger; CEU Press; ISBN 978-9639776951.

=== Secondary sources ===
- B. Szabó, János (2007). A tatárjárás. A mongol hódítás és Magyarország [The Mongol Invasion of Hungary] (in Hungarian). Corvina. ISBN 978-963-13-6348-7.
- Barabás, Gábor (2015). A pápaság és Magyarország a 13. század első felében. Pápai hatás – együttműködés – érdekellentét [The Papacy and Hungary in the First Half of the 13th Century. Papal influence – cooperation – clash of interests] (in Hungarian). Pécsi Történettudományért Kulturális Egyesület. ISBN 978 963 89482 5 0.
- Barabás, Gábor (2017). "Eretnekek, kalózok és legátusok. A boszniai eretnekség, a Magyar Királyság és a pápák a 13. század elején [Heretics, Pirates and Legates: The Bosnian Heresy, the Hungarian Kingdom and the Popes at the Outset of the 13th Century]". Világtörténet (in Hungarian). 39 (1): 5–32. ISSN 0083-6265.
- Borosy, András (1996). "A keresztes háborúk és Magyarország, II. rész [The Crusades and the Hungarian Kingdom, Part II]". Hadtörténelmi Közlemények (in Hungarian). 109 (2). Hadtörténeti Intézet és Múzeum: 11–54. ISSN 0017-6540.
- Dautović, Dženan (2020). "Historiographic controversy about the Crusades against Bosnian "heretics"". Journal of Balkan and Black Sea Studies. 3 (4): 63–77. ISSN 2667-470X.
- Galambosi, Péter (2017). "Csák Ugrin, a hűséges tartományúr [Ugrin Csák, the Loyal Provincial Lord]". Fons (in Hungarian). 24 (3). Szentpétery Imre Történettudományi Alapítvány: 289–322. ISSN 1217-8020.
- Koszta, László (2013). A kalocsai érseki tartomány kialakulása [The Development of the Archdiocese of Kalocsa] (in Hungarian). Pécsi Történettudományért Kulturális Egyesület. ISBN 978-963-89482-2-9.
- Markó, László (2006). A magyar állam főméltóságai Szent Istvántól napjainkig: Életrajzi Lexikon [Great Officers of State in Hungary from King Saint Stephen to Our Days: A Biographical Encyclopedia] (in Hungarian). Helikon Kiadó. ISBN 963-547-085-1.
- Négyesi, Lajos (1997). "A muhi csata. 1241. április 11. [The Battle of Mohi. 11 April 1241]". Hadtörténelmi Közlemények (in Hungarian). 110 (2). Hadtörténeti Intézet és Múzeum: 296–310. ISSN 0017-6540.
- Pintér, János Zsolt (2005). "Tatárok és magyarok (1241–1242) [Tartars and Hungarians (1241–1242)]". Hadtörténelmi Közlemények (in Hungarian). 118 (3). Hadtörténeti Intézet és Múzeum: 660–696. ISSN 0017-6540.
- Solymosi, László (2013). "Magyar főpapok angliai zarándoklata 1220-ban [The Pilgrimage of Hungarian Prelates to England in 1220]". Történelmi Szemle (in Hungarian). 55 (4). Hungarian Academy of Sciences: 527–540. ISSN 0040-9634.
- Udvardy, József (1991). A kalocsai érsekek életrajza (1000–1526) [Biographies of Archbishops of Kalocsa, 1000–1526] (in Hungarian). Görres Gesellschaft.
- Veres, Kristóf György (2019). "A magyar királyi kancellária okleveles gyakorlata 1172 és 1235 között [The institutional practice of the Hungarian royal chancery between 1172 and 1235]". Turul (in Hungarian). 92 (1). Magyar Heraldikai és Genealógiai Társaság: 1–26. ISSN 1216-7258.
- Zsoldos, Attila (2011). Magyarország világi archontológiája, 1000–1301 [Secular Archontology of Hungary, 1000–1301] (in Hungarian). História, MTA Történettudományi Intézete. ISBN 978-963-9627-38-3.

Ugrin Genus Csák Born: c. 1190 Died: 11 April 1241
Political offices
| Preceded by Thomas | Chancellor; 1217–1219 | Succeeded by Cletus Bél |
| Preceded by Albert | Chancellor; 1230–1235 | Succeeded by Matthias Rátót |
Catholic Church titles
| Preceded by Berthold of Merania | Archbishop of Kalocsa; 1219–1241 | Succeeded by Benedict |
