= Matthias Rátót =

Hungarian prelate

- Archbishop of Esztergom
- Archdiocese: Esztergom
- Installed: November 1239
- Term ended: April 11, 1241
- Predecessor: Robert
- Successor: Stephen Báncsa
- Other posts: Provost of Zagreb; Bishop of Vác

Personal details
- Born: c. 1200
- Died: April 11, 1241 (aged 40–41) Mohi, Kingdom of Hungary
- Denomination: Catholic

Matthias from the kindred Rátót (Hungarian: Rátót nembeli Mátyás; died April 11, 1241) was a Hungarian prelate in the first half of the 13th century, who served as Bishop of Vác from 1238 to 1240, then Archbishop of Esztergom from 1239 until his death in the Battle of Mohi (Sajó River). He was the first Archbishop of Esztergom who was referred to as Primate of Hungary.

== Biography ==
Matthias was born into the gens (clan) Rátót, which originated from Apulia and settled down in Hungary in late 11th century, according to Simon of Kéza's Gesta Hunnorum et Hungarorum. However his parents are unidentified, thus there is inability to connect his person to the any branches of the clan. Historian János Karácsonyi claimed that Matthias was the younger son of Rathold Rátót, ancestor of the Gyulafi branch. Consequently it is possible that Dominic I Rátót, Master of the treasury, who was killed in Mohi too, was Matthias' elder brother.

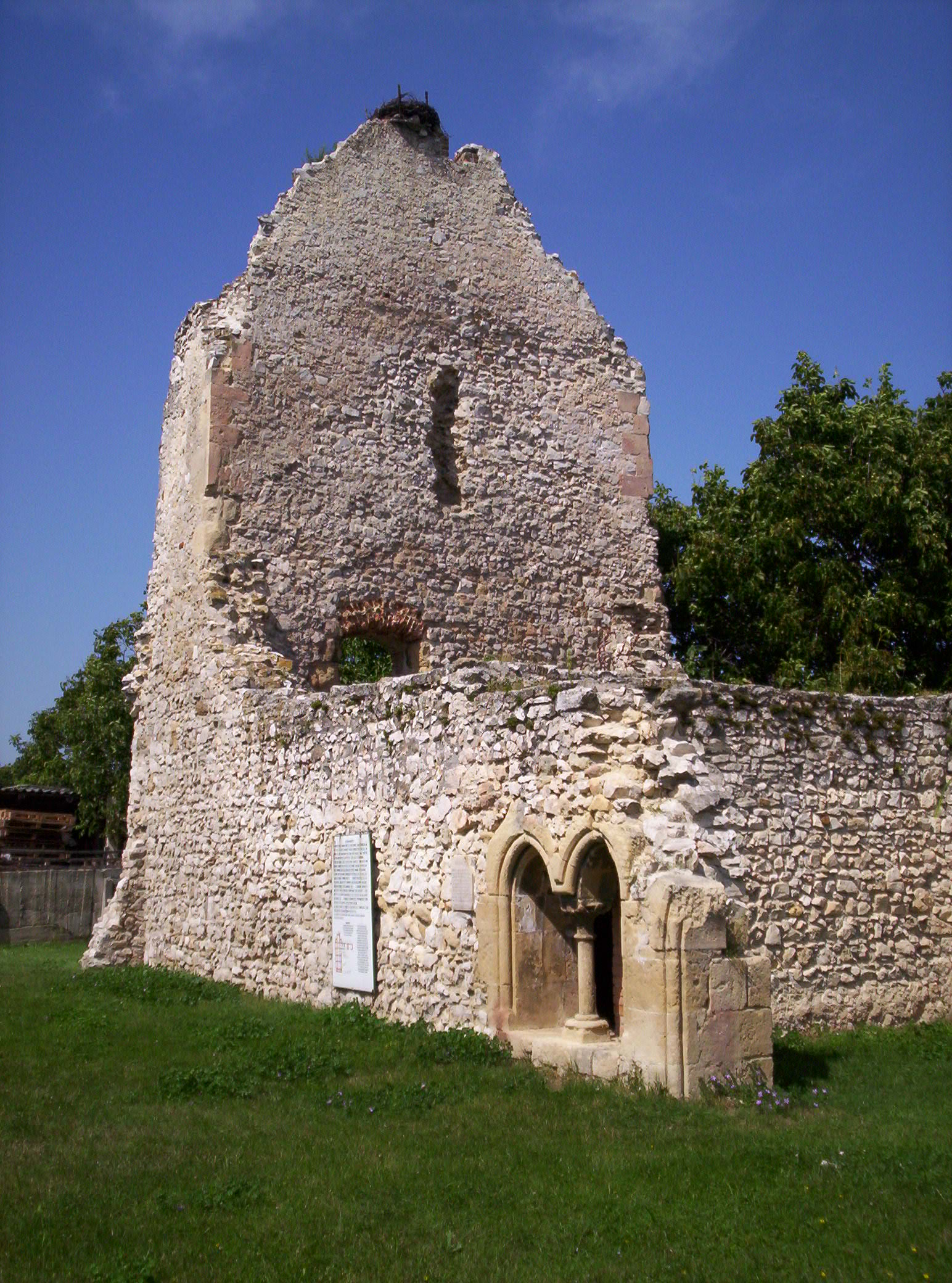
Ruins of the Premonstratensian monastery in Veszprém–Gyulafirátót

According to the narration of Roger of Torre Maggiore's Carmen Miserabile, Matthias grew up in the royal court of Andrew II together with heir Béla, therefore possibly he was born in the early 1200s (historian Nándor Knauz considered 1206 as the year of birth). Since his early years, Matthias belonged to Duke Béla's confidants, who strongly opposed his father "useless and superfluous perpetual grants" which caused the derogation of the royal power in the realm. When Béla was made Duke of Slavonia in 1220, Matthias became a member of his ducal court. Since 1224, he served as provost of Zagreb and chancellor for Duke Béla simultaneously. He held both offices at least until 1233, even after Béla was transferred from Slavonia to Transylvania in 1226 to govern the province as duke. In both capacities, he had an influence on the issuance of diplomas, which is confirmed by the philological similarity of the arengas of documents issued by the two institutions, the bishopric of Zagreb and Béla's ducal court.

When Béla IV ascended the Hungarian throne in 1235, Matthias was promoted to the court office of chancellor in the royal court, while maintained his clerical position of provost of Zagreb. He was last mentioned as chancellor by a royal charter in 1236, but it is plausible that he held the office until 1238, when he was elected Bishop of Vác, and his successor Stephen Báncsa first appeared as chancellor in contemporary records only in that year. Matthias was referred to as Bishop of Vác at first in January 1238, when the abbot of the Scottish Benedictine Abbey in Vienna requested him to excommunicate a certain knight Wernher from Pest, based on a papal judgment in August of last year, thus Matthias was a consecrated and confirmed bishop by then. In August 1238, Pope Gregory IX instructed Bishop Matthias to support Béla's policy against the domestic opponents.

Matthias Rátót succeeded to the archbishopric of Esztergom upon the death of Archbishop Robert, who died on 1 November 1239. He was elected by the Esztergom Chapter between around 2 and 29 November. Initially, Pope Gregory IX refused the confirmation of his election, citing the "disregard for canon law standards" during the process. Following that several ecclesiastical and secular illustrious persons – including Béla IV himself and his younger brother Duke Coloman – testified in favor of the legitimacy of Matthias's election. Consequently, his election was confirmed by Pope Gregory IX on 6 March 1240, who then also sent a pallium to him. Despite that he was still referred to as postulated archbishop on 21 March, while still functioned as Bishop of Vác at the same time. Matthias Rátót was the first Archbishop of Esztergom, who was styled as Primate of Hungary by a royal charter. Pope Gregory invited him to Rome on 9 August 1240 to attend a council which should be addressed at Easter 1241 after he denounced Emperor Frederick II as a heretic. However Frederick responded by trying to capture or sink as many ships carrying prelates to the synod as he could. After these developments, Matthias refused to attend, referring to the dangerous journey. With the permission of Béla IV, received by his predecessor Robert in 1239, Matthias ordered to build Víziváros (Latin: Civitas Archiepiscopalis, a neighborhood of Esztergom). He also built the Premonstratensian monastery of Gyulafirátót, the ancient seat of his kindred (today a borough in Veszprém).

During the First Mongol invasion of Hungary, Matthias and his deputy, archdeacon Albert gathered their army in Esztergom and joined Duke Coloman's troops, marching together to Pest. In the Battle of Mohi on 11 April 1241, Matthias personally led his troops, when fell with commander Archbishop Ugrin Csák and majority of the bishops (for instance, Reynold of Transylvania and Jacob of Nyitra were among them) as they were leading troops against Batu Khan. According to magister Roger, his body was never found.

== Sources ==
- Berend, Nora (2006). At the Gate of Christendom: Jews, Muslims and "Pagans" in Medieval Hungary, c.1000-c.1300. Cambridge University Press. ISBN 978-0-521-02720-5.
- Galla, Ferenc (1970). "A váci egyházmegye püspökei [The Bishops of the Diocese of Vác]". In Bánk, József (ed.). Váci egyházmegyei almanach Szent István millénium évében (in Hungarian). Roman Catholic Diocese of Vác. pp. 103–201.
- Juhász, Csaba (2019). "Zágrábi arengák és narratiók a 13. század első feléből [Harangue and Narrations from the Diocese of Zagreb in the first half of the 13th century]". Magyar Könyvszemle (in Hungarian). 135 (3): 279–306. ISSN 0025-0171.
- Karácsonyi, János (1905). "A sajómezei csatában elesett esztergomi érsek nemzetsége [The Kindred of that Archbishop of Esztergom who was Killed in the Battle of Sajó River]". Turul (in Hungarian). 23 (2): 86.
- Markó, László (2006). A magyar állam főméltóságai Szent Istvántól napjainkig: Életrajzi Lexikon [Great Officers of State in Hungary from King Saint Stephen to Our Days: A Biographical Encyclopedia] (in Hungarian). Helikon Kiadó. ISBN 963-208-970-7.
- Varga, Lajos (2003). "Rátót nembeli Mátyás [Matthias from the kindred Rátót]". In Beke, Margit (ed.). Esztergomi érsekek 1001–2003 [Archbishops of Esztergom 1001–2003] (in Hungarian). Szent István Társulat. pp. 104–106. ISBN 963-361-472-4.
- Zsoldos, Attila (2011). Magyarország világi archontológiája, 1000–1301 [Secular Archontology of Hungary, 1000–1301] (in Hungarian). História, MTA Történettudományi Intézete. ISBN 978-963-9627-38-3.

Matthias Genus Rátót Born: 1200s Died: 11 April 1241
Political offices
Preceded by Ugrin Csák	Chancellor; 1235–1236	Succeeded by Stephen Báncsa
Catholic Church titles
Preceded by Briccius	Bishop of Vác; 1238–1240	Succeeded by Stephen Báncsa
Preceded by Robert	Archbishop of Esztergom; 1239–1241	Succeeded by Stephen Báncsa
