= Ugrin Csák (archbishop of Split) =

13th Century Hungarian Archbishop

- Archbishop of Split
- Appointed: 1244
- Term ended: 27 November 1248
- Predecessor: Thomas the Archdeacon (elected)
- Successor: John Hahót (elected)
- Other post: Provost of Čazma

Orders
- Consecration: 20 September 1247 by Treguanus of Trogir, Nicholas of Hvar, Bartholomew of Skradin and Philip of Senj

Personal details
- Born: c. 1207
- Died: 27 November 1248 Split, Croatia in personal union with Hungary
- Buried: Church of the Friars Preachers, Split
- Parents: Bás (II)
- Education: University of Paris

Ugrin from the kindred Csák (Hungarian: Csák nembeli Ugrin, Croatian: Hugrin; c. 1207 – 27 November 1248) was a Hungarian prelate in the 13th century, who served as Archbishop of Split from 1244 until his death.

== Family ==
Ugrin was born into the Újlak branch of the powerful gens (clan) Csák, an ancient Hungarian kindred. His namesake uncle was Ugrin Csák, the influential Archbishop of Kalocsa from 1219 to 1241.

His parentage is uncertain. Late 19th-century genealogist János Karácsonyi considered Ugrin was a grandson of Bás (II) through a hypothetical unidentified son, which, however, is unlikely, since, according to the family tree thus drawn, Ugrin's assumed cousin (John) and second cousins would have survived him for more than half a century. Historian Pál Engel argued Ugrin was the son of Pós (or Pous), who served as Ban of Severin and Master of the treasury in 1235. Engel incorrectly distinguished two noblemen named Pós, assuming a father-son relationship. Péter Galambosi proved the identification between them. He considered Ugrin was perhaps the son of Bás (II), the brother of Pós and Ugrin of Kalocsa.

== Early career ==
Ugrinus was a man of letters, blessed with natural eloquence and especially well versed in divine scriptures. He had studied in Paris for some twelve years on the Faculty of Theology, the costs of his studies being met by his uncle Ugrinus, the archbishop of Kalocsa. He had enough money to buy a whole Bible together with commentaries and glosses, such as the masters in the schools are wont to read.

— Thomas the Archdeacon: History of the Bishops of Salona and Split

Ugrin (also Ugrinus or Hugrinus) was born around 1207. Under the patronage of his namesake uncle, he entered ecclesiastical service and joined the Dominican Order. He studied at the University of Paris, where he spent twelve years and his theologian studies was funded by his uncle (Croatian historiography mistakenly often attributes this data to Stephen II, Bishop of Zagreb since an error made by Nada Klaić). Ugrin bore the title of magister, reflecting his education. Ugrin was referred to as lector of the cathedral chapter of Kalocsa in December 1233.

Thereafter, Ugrin became the first known provost of the collegiate chapter of Čazma (Csázma), located in the Diocese of Zagreb. In this capacity, he was a confidant of Duke Coloman, who established his court there. During the first Mongol invasion of Hungary (1241–1242), Ugrin joined the accompaniment of King Béla IV of Hungary, who fled to Zagreb, escaping from the advancing Mongols. According to the contemporary Thomas the Archdeacon's Historia Salonitana, Ugrin was among those barons and prelates, who escorted the monarch to Dalmatia and entered Split (Spalato) then Trogir (Trau) in early 1242.

== Prelate ==
Moreover, he [Ugrin] held both titles, that of archbishop and that of count [of Split]; yet, not content with these, he longed with all his heart for ever greater heights and riches. Noble blood fed his conceit and the fire of youth his love of pomp, while his uncommonly tall figure and handsome face left him with no mean opinion of himself. He was totally involved in secular matters, and gave scant attention to the affairs of the church, treating them as incidental and of minor importance. As he was given over to the pursuit of worldly vanities, he sought out the company of any but wise or religious persons, and delighted to have about him companies of men-at-arms. And when his household income was insufficient to pay for the wages of these soldiers, he unlawfully reached out for the property of others and what was forbidden. For in richness of table and wardrobe and crowds of attendant clients he desired to be the equal of the prelates of Hungary. He thus became a harsh exactor and burdensome overlord to clerics, laymen and monasteries alike. He also attempted to deprive the canons of their rights altogether and to appropriate for his own use all four parts of the tithes; however, he was unable to prevail in the face of the opposition of the archdeacon [Thomas] and others. He succeeded only in usurping the portion set aside for the poor, contrary to the custom of his predecessors.

— Thomas the Archdeacon: History of the Bishops of Salona and Split

The presence of the royal court in Dalmatia during the Mongol invasion intensively affected the election of archbishops, and, consequently, the autonomy of Split. The citizens and the local clergy elected Bishop Stephen of Zagreb, the king's candidate as their new archbishop in the summer of 1242, but his election was never confirmed and had to relinquish his title. The cathedral chapter, excluding the burgher magistrates, elected Thomas the Archdeacon, the proponent of the local medieval commune movement, as his successor in 1243; the burghers protested against the process which was contrary to customary law in Split. Thomas withdrew from the nomination. Under the pressure of Béla IV, the chapter elected Ugrin Csák as the Archbishop of Split in 1244, when the city, under Matej Ninoslav, embroiled into conflict with Trogir. Ugrin represented the Hungarian influence over Split in the following years. Following the royal victory against Matej Ninoslav, Béla, who sought to consolidate his royal authority in Dalmatia, appointed Ugrin as comes (ispán or župan) of Split on 2 October 1244 too, thus the archbishop also became responsible for the secular affairs in the city. Beside that, Ugrin was also installed as count of Cetina and the islands Brač, Lastovo and Korčula. In the history of Split, Ugrin was the only cleric who held the title of comes. On the part of the king, the appointment was a response to the conflictual relationship between Split and Trogir, which was a burden for the royal court. The commune supported the appointment of Ugrin as comes of Split, because in this way they hoped for royal support regarding their territorial claims against Trogir.

Thomas the Archdeacon and his followers considered Ugrin's election as invalid, but they remained in the minority. His activity as archbishop is mostly narrated by his political opponent Thomas the Archdeacon, which is thus understandably not free from bias. Ugrin and his escort arrived to Split shortly after the Easter of 1245 (16 April). Archbishop-elect Ugrin played an important role in restoring peace between Split and Trogir in 1245; since he primarily sought to represent Hungarian royal interests in Dalmatia over those of his city and archiepiscopal see, he was willing to settle the conflict as soon as possible; the conditions of the peace was seriously disadvantaged for Split. Archdeacon Thomas blamed Ugrin that he "behaved mildly and peacefully" towards the enemies of the city, while reserved his "full harshness and severity for his fellow citizens". During his episcopate, Ugrin always had a strained relationship with the chapter. Archdeacon Thomas claimed that Ugrin took those church resources and income, which he had no jurisdiction to, and also curtailed the chapter's rights. The unfavorable peace with Trogir in 1245 resulted the cessation of the initial harmonic relationship with the commune too. According to Judit Gál, Thomas' antipathy (beyond personal involvement) reflects the difference between the Hungarian and Dalmatian role perceptions of the prelate. In Hungary, they were prestigious landowners of high born origin, political figures and military leaders too, while the Dalmatian prelates mostly had a local, at most regional role, and did not have any influence in national affairs, and mostly originated from local burgher elite.

Pope Innocent IV confirmed Ugrin's election on 7 July 1246. He was consecrated as archbishop by his suffragans, Treguanus of Trogir, Nicholas of Hvar, Bartholomew of Skradin and Philip of Senj in the Cathedral of Saint Domnius on 20 September 1247. After his consecration, he sent Philip of Senj to the Roman Curia of Lyon for his pallium. Returning Dalmatia, Philip handed over the pallium to Bartholomew of Skradin in accordance with the pope's instruction. Bartholomew, who had by then resigned and entered the Franciscan order, invested Ugrin to his archbishopric officially. Following that, Ugrin installed a fellow Hungarian Dominican friar John Hahót as the Bishop of Skradin in 1248.

Ugrin Csák died on 27 November 1248, after a severe illness. Archdeacon Thomas claims that Ugrin secretly confessed "his sins and certain excesses" on his deathbed. He was buried in the Church of the Friars Preachers of Split. Following his death, John Hahót, Bishop of Skradin was elected as archbishop by Ugrin's confidants, but the pope refused to confirm him and, instead, appointed Roger of Torre Maggiore in 1249. Ugrin was succeeded as comes of Split by Stephen Gutkeled, Ban of Slavonia.

== Sources ==
=== Primary sources ===
- Archdeacon Thomas of Split: History of the Bishops of Salona and Split (Latin text by Olga Perić, edited, translated and annotated by Damir Karbić, Mirjana Matijević Sokol and James Ross Sweeney) (2006). CEU Press. ISBN 963-7326-59-6.

=== Secondary sources ===
- C. Tóth, Norbert (2019). A kalocsa-bácsi főegyházmegye káptalanjainak középkori archontológiája [Medieval Archontology of the Chapters of the Archdiocese of Kalocsa–Bács] (in Hungarian). Kalocsai Főegyházmegyei Levéltár. ISBN 978-615-5940-01-9.
- Gál, Judit (2020). Dalmatia and the Exercise of Royal Authority in the Árpád-Era Kingdom of Hungary. Arpadiana III., Research Centre for the Humanities. ISBN 978-963-416-227-8.
- Gál, Judit (2023). "Csák Ugrin spalatói érsek, comes és a király embere [Ugrin Csák, the Archbishop and Count of Split, and the Man of the King]". Világtörténet (in Hungarian). 45 (2): 279–298. ISSN 0083-6265.
- Galambosi, Péter (2017). "Csák Ugrin, a hűséges tartományúr [Ugrin Csák, the Loyal Provincial Lord]". Fons (in Hungarian). 24 (3). Szentpétery Imre Történettudományi Alapítvány: 289–322. ISSN 1217-8020.
- Juhász, Csaba (2019). "Zágrábi arengák és narratiók a 13. század első feléből [Harangue and Narrations from the Diocese of Zagreb in the first half of the 13th century]". Magyar Könyvszemle (in Hungarian). 135 (3): 279–306. doi:10.17167/mksz.2019.3.279-306. hdl:10831/47054. ISSN 0025-0171. S2CID 239539789.

Ugrin Genus Csák Born: c. 1207 Died: 27 November 1248
Catholic Church titles
Preceded by Thomas (elected)	Archbishop of Split; 1244–1248	Succeeded by John Hahót (elected)
