= Curetes =

The term Curetes (/kjʊəˈriːtiːz/; Greek: Κουρῆτες) may refer to:

- Curetes or Korybantes, the dancing attendants respectively of Rhea or Cybele in Greek mythology
- Curetes (tribe), in Greek mythology
- Curetes or Curibantes, an erroneous Latin name for the inhabitants of the island of Krk and Curetia for Croatia, according the Thomas the Archdeacon's Historia Salonitana (13th century)
