= Sack of Budapest =

Sack of Budapest may refer to:

- the devastation of Hungary after the 1241 Battle of Mohi against the Mongols
- the pillage of Buda by the Ottoman army after the 1526 Battle of Mohács
- the invasion of Hungary by the Soviet army following the Hungarian Revolution of 1956
