= John Hahót =

Dominican friar

- Archbishop of Split
- Installed: 1266
- Term ended: 1294
- Predecessor: Roger of Torre Maggiore
- Successor: James
- Previous post: Bishop of Skradin

Personal details
- Died: 1294
- Denomination: Catholic
- Residence: Cathedral of Saint Domnius
- Parents: Michael I Hahót (presumably)

John from the kindred Hahót (Hungarian: Hahót nembeli János, Croatian: Ivan de Buzad; died 1294) was a Dominican friar of Hungarian noble-origin.

He served as Bishop of Skradin from 1248 to 1266, then Archbishop of Split from 1266 to 1294.

In this capacity, he styled himself as, "Primate of Dalmatia, Croatia and Slavonia" (Latin: Dalmatiae, Croatiae Sclavoniaeque primas) in his own documents.

== Sources ==
- Gál, Judit (2014). ""Qui erat gratiosus aput eum" A spliti érsekek szerepe az Árpádok királyságában ["Qui erat gratious aput eum" The Role of the Archbishops of Split in the Kingdom of Hungary 1113–1248]". In Belucz, Mónika; et al. (eds.). Magister historiae (in Hungarian). Eötvös Loránd University. pp. 53–71. ISBN 978-963-284-527-2.

John Genus Hahót Born: ? Died: 1294
Catholic Church titles
| Preceded by Bartholomew | Bishop of Skradin; 1248–1266 | Succeeded by Andrew |
| Preceded by Ugrin Csák | Archbishop of Split (elected); 1248–1249 | Succeeded by Roger of Torre Maggiore |
| Preceded by Roger of Torre Maggiore | Archbishop of Split; 1266–1294 | Succeeded by James |
