= Battle of Mohi =

1241 battle during the first Mongol invasion of Hungary

- Part of the First Mongol invasion of Hungary
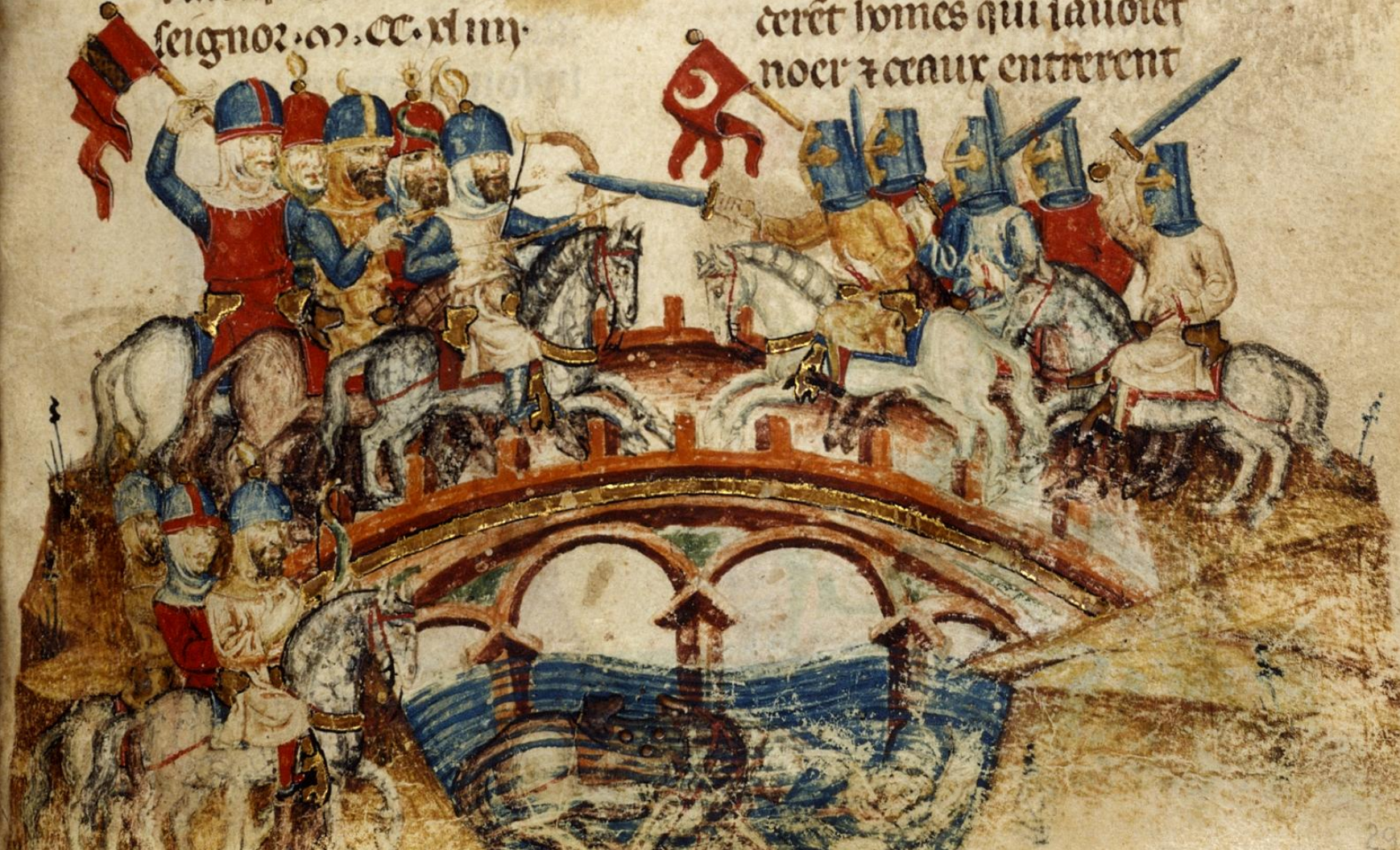
| Date | 11 April 1241 |
| Location | Sajó River, near Muhi, Hungary 47°58′40″N 20°54′47″E |
| Result | Mongol victory |

Belligerents
| Mongol Empire | Kingdom of Hungary Kingdom of Croatia Knights Templar Duchy of Austria |

Commanders and leaders
| Batu Khan; Subutai; Shiban; Berke; Boroldai; Bakatu † | Béla IV of Hungary; Coloman of Slavonia (DOW); Ugrin Csák †; Matthias Rátót †; Frederick II of Austria; Denis Tomaj †; Rembald de Voczon |

Units involved
| Horse archers Horse lancers Stone throwers Possibly Chinese firearm units and other gunpowder units | Infantry; Crossbowmen; Light cavalry |

Strength
| ~15,000–30,000 cavalry (contemporary sources) Other estimations: 70,000 50,000 20,000 At least seven stone throwers | 80,000 50,000 25,000 |

Casualties and losses
| Few hundreds Very heavy | ~10,000 (contemporary sources); Most of the army |
- Location within Hungary

The Battle of Mohi (11 April 1241) was a pivotal conflict between the Mongol Empire and the Kingdom of Hungary during the Mongol invasion of Europe. The battle took place at Muhi (then Mohi), a town located in present-day Hungary, southwest of the Sajó River. The Mongol Empire, led by Batu Khan, sought to expand its territories into Europe, while the Kingdom of Hungary, led by King Béla IV, aimed to protect its borders. The battle resulted in a victory for the Mongols, who destroyed the Hungarian royal army at a heavy cost which contributed to the decision to halt the Mongol campaign. This defeat marked a significant turning point in Hungarian history, marking a shift in the balance of power in eastern Europe. The Mongols' victory led to a period of rebuilding and reorganization in Hungary, while also influencing the development of European politics and culture. The battle is considered one of the most important events in Hungarian history, with far-reaching consequences for the region.

== Background ==
=== Hungary's failed defence policy ===
The military doctrine of the Hungarian kings prohibited nobles from constructing private stone castles/fortresses for their own protection within the realm during most of the high medieval era. Consequently, the building of stone castles was an exclusive royal monopoly in the Kingdom of Hungary. It was believed that privately built strongholds by landowners could ultimately lead to the strengthening of oligarchy and a decline in the royal power. Castles were only authorized to be built in strategically significant locations deemed important by the monarchs, primarily along the western border near the Holy Roman Empire. This policy proved to be successful to preserve the nearly absolute royal power in the realm, however lack of stone castles along the routes of the Mongol invasion backfired during the Mongol attacks.

=== Mongol invasions in Europe ===
The Mongols attacked the eastern side of Central Europe with three distinct armies. Two of them attacked through Poland in order to protect the flank from Polish cousins of Béla IV of Hungary, winning several victories. Most notably, they defeated the army of Duke Henry II the Pious of Silesia at Legnica. A southern army attacked Transylvania, defeated the voivod and crushed the Transylvanian armies. The main army, led by Batu Khan and Subutai, attacked Hungary through the fortified Verecke Pass and annihilated the army led by Denis Tomaj, the count palatine, on 12 March 1241, while the final army under Batu's brother Shiban marched in an arc north of the main force. Prior to the invasion, King Béla had personally supervised the construction of dense natural barriers along Hungary's eastern border, intending to slow the Mongol advance and obstruct their movement. However, the Mongols possessed specialized units who cleared the paths at great pace, removing the obstacles in just three days. Combined with the extreme speed of the Mongol advance, called "lightning" by a European observer, the Hungarians lacked time to properly group their forces.

=== Warnings and Hungarian preparations ===
In 1223, the expanding Mongol Empire defeated a group of semi-allied Rus city states at the Kalka River, using the ancient horse-archer tactic of the feigned retreat under Subutai and Jebe. This was part of their great cavalry raid to explore the lands beyond their knowledge under the direction of Genghis Khan. The defeated princes of Rus who were captured by the Mongols were crushed to death under a victory platform following the battle. At this time, the Mongols were purely an expeditionary force in Europe, and did not besiege major cities such as Kyiv until decades later, under the direction of Genghis Khan's son and successor, Ögedei.

Hungary had tried to convert the Cumans to Christianity and expand its influence over them for several decades beforehand. The Hungarian king Béla IV even began to use the title "King of Cumania". When Cuman refugees (ca. 40,000 people) sought refuge in his kingdom after being crushed by the Mongols, it seemed that at least a portion of the Cumans had accepted Hungarian rule. The Mongols saw Hungary as a rival, and the Cuman migration to Hungary as a casus belli. In their ultimatum, they also blamed Hungary for "missing envoys".

The Mongolian threat appeared during a time of political turmoil in Hungary. Traditionally, the base of royal power consisted of vast estates owned as royal property. Under King Andrew II, donations of land to nobles by the crown reached a new peak: whole counties were donated. After Béla IV inherited his father's throne he began to reconfiscate Andrew's donations and to execute or expel his advisers. He also denied the nobles' right of personal hearings and accepted only written petitions to his chancellery. He even had the chairs of the council chamber taken away in order to force everybody to stand in his presence. His actions caused great disaffection among the nobles. The newly arrived and grateful Cumans gave the king more power (and increased prestige with the Church for converting them), but also caused more friction. The nomadic Cumans did not easily integrate with the settled Hungarians and the nobles were shocked that the king supported the Cumans in quarrels between the two.

King Béla began to mobilise his army and ordered all of his troops, including the Cumans, to the city of Pest. Frederick II, Duke of Austria and Styria, also arrived there to help him. At this moment, the conflict between Cumans and Hungarians caused riots and the Cuman khan—who had been under the personal protection of the king—was murdered. Some sources mention the role of Duke Frederick in inciting this riot, but his true role is unknown. Another possibility is that Mongol spies helped spread rumors of the supposed Cuman-Mongol alliance to cause panic, similar to what the Mongols had done in the invasion of Khwarezm. The Cumans believed that they had been betrayed, and left the country to the south, pillaging all the way. The full mobilisation was unsuccessful; many contingents were unable to reach Pest; some were destroyed by Mongols before they arrived, some by renegade Cumans. Many nobles refused to take part in the campaign because they hated the king and desired his downfall. The loss of the Cumans was painful for Béla, because they were the one army in Europe who had experience fighting the Mongols.

== Battle ==
=== Initial actions ===
The Mongol vanguard reached Pest on 15 March and began to pillage the neighbouring area. King Béla forbade his men to attack them, as the Hungarian army was still unprepared. Even so, Duke Frederick attacked and defeated a minor raiding party and used this to attempt to smear Béla as a coward. After this "heroic" act, Duke Frederick returned home, abandoning his Hungarian rival. Meanwhile, the Mongols had destroyed several other Hungarian forces that were unable to link up with the main army in time. Ugrin Csák, Archbishop of Kalocsa, also tried to attack a Mongol contingent, but he was lured to a swamp and his armoured cavalry became irretrievably stuck in it. He barely escaped with his life. The army of the Count Palatine also was annihilated, as previously mentioned. The southern Mongol army also defeated another Hungarian force at Nagyvárad.

Finally, the king decided to offer the Mongols battle, but they began to retreat. This affirmed the opinion of the nobles that the Mongols were not a threat and the king's behaviour was not cautious but cowardly. After a week of forced marches and frequent Mongol attacks, the Hungarian army, a collection of varied Hungarian forces, reached the flooded River Sajó. The size of the Hungarian army is unknown. The closest hard evidence comes from the Epternacher Notiz, a contemporary account of the battle by a German chronicler which reported that the Hungarians lost 10,000 men, suggesting their whole army was around that size. For the Mongols, the closest hard evidence comes from the works of Rashid al-Din, drawing on Mongol sources, which report that the Mongol force for the entire Central European invasion was 40,000 horsemen, of which only a portion were actually at Muhi.

For their part the Mongols claimed their enemy outnumbered them, with Juvaini (drawing on Mongol sources) reporting that the Mongol reconnaissance force (10,000 men) estimated the Hungarian army was twice as numerous as the Mongol army. However, a clearly exaggerated estimate of 400,000 for the Hungarian army was provided, implying 200,000 Mongol troops. Juvaini's wording also implied that the Hungarian host was mostly mounted. Hungarian chroniclers claimed that the Mongols were superior numerically many times over, though they also give unlikely figures, with one chronicler stating that the Mongols invaded with 500,000 troops.

The Hungarians stopped to rest and to wait for additional supplies, but because of the wooded terrain on the far bank of the Sajó the king and the Hungarians still did not know that the main Mongol army was present. The cautious king ordered the building of a heavily fortified camp of wagons, a battle-tested countermeasure against nomadic armies.

=== Mongol plan ===
It is highly unlikely that the Mongols originally wanted to cross a wide and dangerous river to attack a fortified camp. It is more likely that their original plan was to ambush the Hungarians while crossing the river, as in the Battle of the Kalka River, although this is still not certain. A Ruthenian slave of the Mongols escaped to the Hungarians and warned them that the Mongols intended a night attack over the bridge over the Sajó. The Mongols planned to bring their three contingents together if possible before engaging in battle and watched for signs that the Hungarians planned to attack. Though effective against traditional nomadic armies, the Hungarian camp became a liability due to the Mongols' advanced siege equipment.

=== Fight at the Sajó bridge ===
The Hungarians still did not believe that there would be a full-scale attack, but the troops of the King's brother Coloman, Duke of Slavonia, and Archbishop Ugrin Csák with Rembald de Voczon, the Templar master, left the camp to surprise the Mongols and defend the unguarded bridge. The Mongol force at the bridge was a vanguard sent by Batu to secure it during the night. They reached the bridge at midnight, having marched the last seven kilometres in darkness.

When Coloman and Ugrin arrived they found the Mongols unprepared and in the middle of crossing the bridge. They successfully forced them into battle and achieved a victory there. The Mongols had been unprepared for the crossbowmen, who inflicted considerable losses on them, helped by the size of the bridge, which was at least 200 meters long. The Mongol vanguard was killed nearly to a man, with Thomas of Split writing: "the Hungarians immediately charged into them and did battle. They cut down a great many of them and pushed the rest back over the bridge, causing them to be drowned in the river." The Hungarians left some soldiers to guard the bridge and returned to the camp, unaware that the main Mongol army was nearby. Arriving at the camp at around 02:00, they celebrated their victory.

=== Main battle ===
==== Morning ====
Following the skirmish, Sejban was sent north to a ford with a smaller force to cross the river and attack the rear of the bridge-guard. As daylight started to break, they began the crossing. Meanwhile, Subutai went south to build a makeshift emergency bridge while the Hungarians were engaged at the main bridge, but left Batu a plan to use giant stone throwers to clear the crossbowmen opposing them. At dawn, Batu, with the help of seven stone throwers, attacked the Hungarian guards on the bridge. When Sejban and his men arrived, the Hungarians retreated to their camp.

When the fleeing Hungarians arrived at the camp they woke the others. Coloman, Ugrin and the Templar master then left the camp again to deal with the attackers. Others remained there, believing this was also a minor attack and that Coloman would again be victorious. But as Coloman and Ugrin witnessed the horde of Mongols swell, they realised that this was not a minor raid but an attack by the main Mongol force. After some heavy fighting, they returned to the camp hoping to mobilise the full army. They were badly disappointed, as the King had not even issued orders to prepare for battle. Archbishop Ugrin reproached the King for his faults in public. Finally the Hungarian army sallied forth, but this delay gave Batu enough time to finish the crossing.

The Hungarians outnumbered Batu's detachment, and the Mongols were unable to move quickly because the Sajó was at their backs. In this fighting, Batu suffered heavy losses, losing thirty of his baatars (bodyguards) and one of his lieutenants, Bakatu, when he personally assaulted a strong point with the vanguard. Subutai, who had been delayed by bridge-building, attacked the Hungarians' rear. The Hungarians retreated back to their fortified camp before Subutai could complete his encirclement. Because of the losses suffered and the size of the surviving Hungarian force, Batu suggested a withdrawal. He was no longer confident that his men could defeat the Hungarians if they decided to come out again, and blamed Subutai for the terrible casualties his wing took. Subutai stated that regardless of Batu's decision, he would not retreat until his force reached Pest. Batu was eventually persuaded and resumed the attack.

==== Afternoon ====
Confined within the camp, the mood among the Hungarians turned to panic after their sallies were ineffective and they sustained repeated bombardments by stone and gunpowder. Terrified by the flaming arrows, the trampling crush of their comrades resulted in the deaths of many soldiers. The nobles inside the camp felt little loyalty to the king, and likely would have deserted had they not already been surrounded. Béla's brother, Coloman, rallied enough men to sally out and charge the Mongols, but his attack was driven back. The Mongols used their siege equipment to pound the camp's fortifications, and set fire to the tents. Finally, the demoralized soldiers decided to flee. They tried to escape through a gap left open on purpose by the Mongols, and almost all of them were slaughtered.

Archbishop Ugrin was killed along with another archbishop, three bishops, and numerous other high officials, but Coloman and Béla managed to escape—though Coloman's wounds were so serious that he died soon after. While the Mongols had suffered higher than normal casualties themselves, the Hungarians had lost almost their entire force. Thomas of Spalato, who interviewed many eyewitnesses, claimed that the route the Hungarians tried to flee along was strewn with so many corpses that the ground had become dyed red from their blood.

=== Role of gunpowder and firearms ===
Several modern historians have speculated that Chinese firearms and gunpowder weapons were deployed by the Mongols at the Battle of Muhi. According to William H. McNeill, Chinese gunpowder weapons may have been used in Hungary at that time. Other sources mention weapons like "flaming arrows" and "naphtha bombs". Kenneth Warren Chase credits the Mongols with introducing gunpowder and its associated weaponry into Europe.

== Aftermath ==
With the royal army destroyed at Muhi, the Mongols led by Kadan hunted the Hungarian king. The town of Pest was taken and burnt down. Esztergom was attacked and most of its population killed but the citadel was not taken as larger sieges were avoided given the aim of capturing the king. The Mongols systematically occupied the Great Hungarian Plains, the slopes of the northern Carpathian Mountains, and Transylvania. Where they found local resistance, they killed the population. Where the locals offered no resistance, they forced the men into servitude in the Mongol army. Hungary lay in ruins, and widespread hysteria spread across all of Europe. Nearly half of the inhabited places had been destroyed by the invading armies. Around 15 to 25 percent of the population was lost, mostly in lowland areas, especially in the Alföld, in the southern reaches of the Hungarian plain in the area now called the Banat, and in southern Transylvania.

With no safe place left in Hungary, Béla was chased down to Dalmatia. The royal family finally escaped to Austria to seek help from Béla's archenemy Duke Frederick, who arrested them, extorted an enormous ransom in gold and forced the king to cede three western counties to Austria. It was at this point that King Béla and some of his retinue fled southwest, through Hungarian-controlled territory, to the Adriatic coast and the island fortress of Trogir, where they stayed until the Mongols withdrew. Meanwhile, the rest of Europe was horrified by the defeat and subsequent devastation of Hungary, creating a wave of fear and panic that spread to the Atlantic.

Surviving members of the royal retinue, mostly those who had not arrived at the battle of Muhi in time to participate, along with a number of disorganized irregulars consisting mostly of armed peasants, employed guerrilla tactics to harass the Mongol troops, occasionally engaging them in open battle. However, these attempts were met by massacres by the ruthless Subutai, which stalled any guerrilla attempts in their tracks. The Mongols often bypassed strong points and devastated the nearby agricultural fields and irrigation systems, which later led to a mass starvation. Some modern historians have claimed that well-fortified castles were impenetrable to the Mongol army given that five stone castles located east of the Danube survived the invasion. Such claims were contradicted by other historians who highlighted the skill of siege warfare of the Mongol army against similar fortifications. Rather, the movement speed of the Mongol troops and the hunt for the Hungarian king did not open up possibilities for longer sieges.

On the Mongol side, internal frictions from prior to their armies' departure flared up after the battle. The Mongol/Chinese sources portray Batu as being a mediocre commander-in-chief who blamed Subutai for the losses at Muhi that actually occurred due to Batu's impetuosity. Batu was notably unhappy that he had lost 30+ of his baatars/ba'aturs, and one of his commanders, Bakatu, in addition to anywhere from many hundred to several thousand other soldiers, an unusually high loss for the Mongols. This led to a heated post-victory banquet where Batu was forced to back down and credit their victories to Subutai. Additionally, Güyük and Büri accused Batu of incompetence and riding Subutai's coattails to victory, which led to Batu ejecting the two princes and sending them along with Möngke, likely as an eyewitness, back to Karakorum to be judged by Ögödei. It is highly likely that they also took their own forces with them, further depleting the active Mongol army.

Once across, the princes wanted to force Subutai to return and made additional plans since the enemy was numerous. Subutai replied: "If the princes wish to go back, then they will go back alone. I shall not turn back until I reach the Tuna [Donau] City [Buda and Pest] of the Macha [Magyar]. He then rode to the Macha city, and the various princes came after him. Consequently, the city was assaulted and taken, and they returned. The princes came to see Badu and said: "During the battle at the Huoning River, Subutai was late with his help and consequently we lost our Bahatu." Subutai replied: "The various princes only knew that the water was shallow upstream, and that there was a bridge. Consequently they forded the river and joined in battle. They did not know that downstream I had not yet finished my pontoon bridge. When you now say that I was slow, you must think about the cause." Badu then understood the situation. Afterwards, at a great assembly, they drank to Subutai with mares milk and putao [Grape] wine and discussed the campaign against Qielin as follows: "Everything that was achieved then was due to Subutai's merit."

— Yuan Shi, Biography of Subutai

Seemingly relaying a Mongol version of the story meant to glorify Batu Khan, John of Plano Carpini also stated that a great many Mongols were killed in Hungary and Poland and that they would have retreated at a critical moment at Muhi if not for the inspiring leadership of Batu, who personally rallied his men to lead them to a decisive victory. This is somewhat consistent with the Yuan Shi's version of the events, where the Mongols nearly retreated from Hungary partway through the battle, cautious of the enemy's strength, but in that version it was Subutai who ultimately got them to stay, not Batu.

=== Casualties ===
After their victory, the Mongols did not pause to loot and instead pursued the remainder of the Hungarian army. After killing any stragglers they could find, they began an assault on the Hungarian countryside, solidifying their control over the terrain they had previously blitzed through. The Hungarians' losses were such that they were unable to mount an effective defence. A near-contemporary source reports that 10,000 Hungarian soldiers were killed, almost the entire army. There are no reliable estimates for Mongol casualties; modern historians give estimates ranging from several hundred to several thousand. The exact losses the Mongols took at Muhi are unknown, though they were considerable; Carpini witnessed a large cemetery in Russia exclusively for the Mongol troops killed in the campaign against Hungary, as he was told "many lost their lives there".
