= Lament for the Destruction of Hungary by the Tartars =

The Lament for the Destruction of Hungary by the Tartars (Latin Planctus destructionis regni Hungariae per Tartaros) is a prominent piece of medieval Latin Hungarian poetry. It was written in 1242, shortly after the invasion of Hungary by the Tartars of Batu Khan, by a monk in the retinue of King Béla IV.

In the lament, the poet expresses the view that the invasion is God's punishment for the sins of the Hungarians. The poem is very visual, showing the gruesome invasion of Hungary and the atrocities committed by the Tartars.

The poem begins with an appeal to God, where the persona recognises His supremacy and that His judgement is perfect. In the final section, the persona implores God to deliver the nation from its troubles.
