= Kalocsa Cathedral =

Coordinates: 46.5300°N 18.9737°E

Assumption Cathedral
- Nagyboldogasszony Főszékesegyház
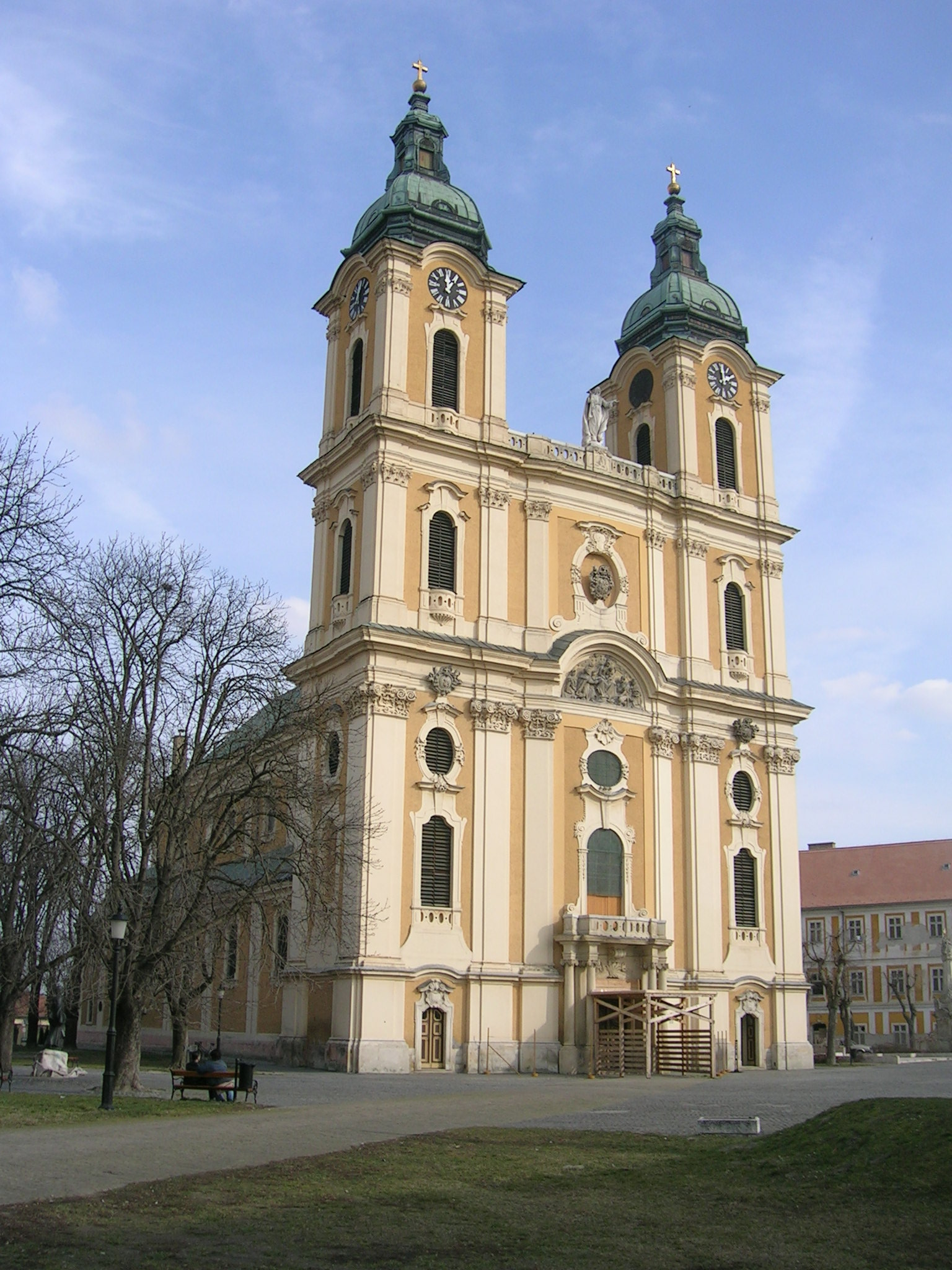
- Assumption Cathedral
- Location: Kalocsa
- Country: Hungary
- Denomination: Roman Catholic Church

The Assumption Cathedral (Hungarian: Nagyboldogasszony Főszékesegyház) also called Kalocsa Cathedral is a religious building of the Catholic church that serves as the cathedral of the Archdiocese of Kalocsa-Kecskemét, located in the city of Kalocsa, in Hungary.

== History ==
In 1050 the first church was built; it was destroyed several times over the centuries. The current cathedral was built on the remains of the previous churches, and was built between 1728 and 1774 in Baroque style. Most of the documents were lost eighteenth century, and the architect's name is uncertain. The cathedral was probably designed by Andreas Fischer Emanuel Mayerhoffera or Josef von Erlach, though it may have been designed by someone else. Part of the baroque church burned down in the late eighteenth century. The stucco on the ceiling was made by Italian masters, while the altarpiece of the Assumption is the work of Leopold Kupelwieser, a native of Vienna. Figures in front of the main altar represent kings Stephen I and Ladislas I.

== See also ==
- Roman Catholicism in Hungary
- List of cathedrals in Hungary

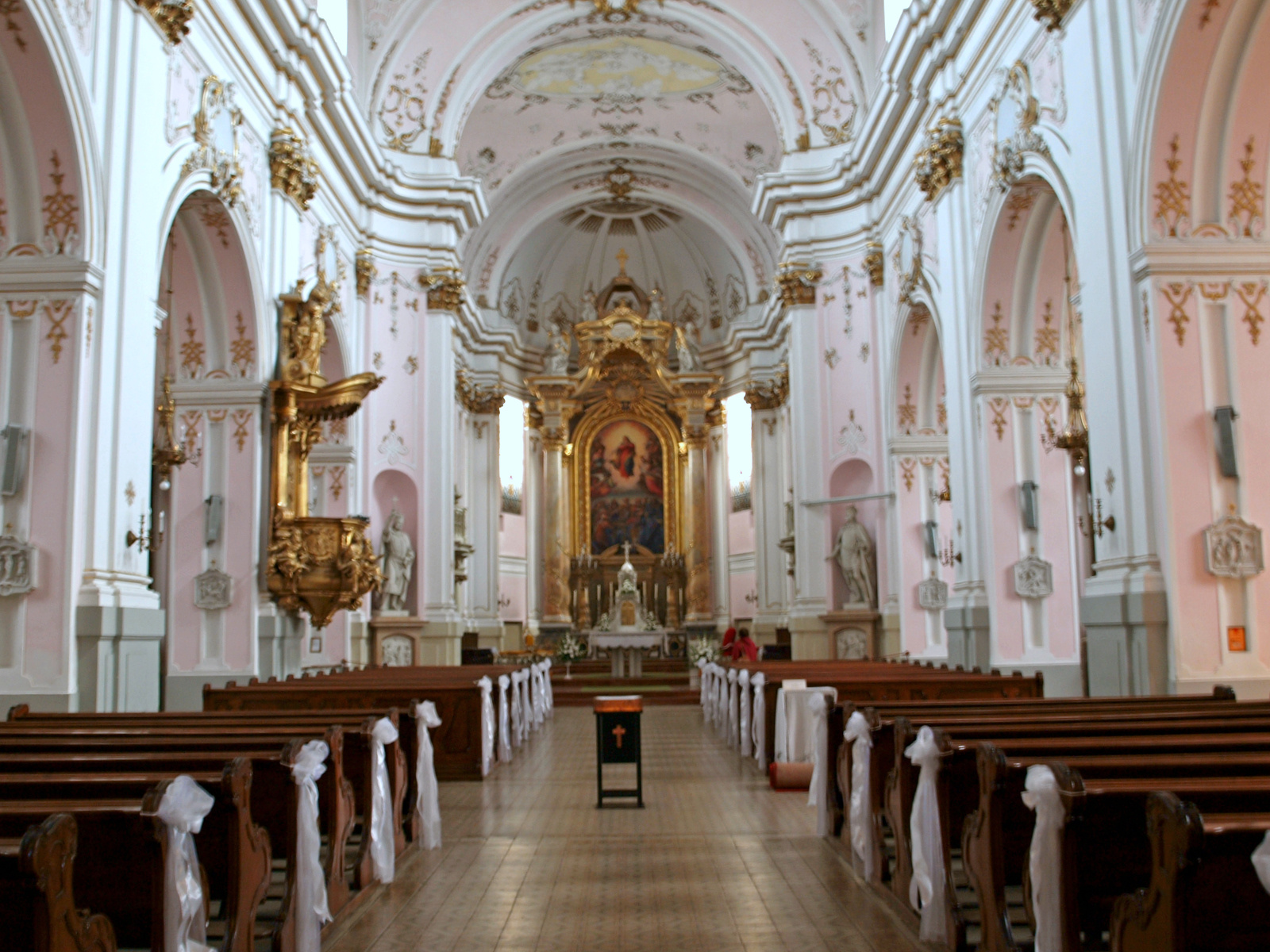
Internal view
