= Roger of Torre Maggiore =

Italian prelate (1205–1266)

- Archbishop of Split
- Province: Split
- Diocese: Archdiocese of Split
- See: Archbishop of Split
- Appointed: 1249
- Term ended: 14 April 1266
- Predecessor: John Hahót elected
- Successor: John Hahót
- Other posts: Archdeacon of Várad; Archdeacon of Sopron; Canon in Zagreb

Personal details
- Born: Roger c. 1205 Torre Maggiore, Apulia
- Died: 14 April 1266 Split, Dalmatia
- Buried: Cathedral of Saint Domnius, Split, Dalmatia

Roger of Torre Maggiore or Master Roger (Hungarian: Rogerius mester; 1205 in Torre Maggiore – April 14, 1266 in Split) was an Italian prelate active in the Kingdom of Hungary in the middle of the 13th century. He was archbishop of Split in Dalmatia from 1249 until his death. His Epistle to the Sorrowful Lament upon the Destruction of the Kingdom of Hungary by the Tatars is a unique and important source of the Mongol invasion of the Kingdom of Hungary in 1241 and 1242.

== Early life ==
According to archdeacon Thomas of Split, Roger was "from a town called Turris Cepia in the region of Benevento", that has been identified with Torre Maggiore in Apulia in Italy. He arrived in the Kingdom of Hungary in the retinue of Cardinal Giacomo da Pecorara, a papal legate sent to King Andrew II of Hungary in 1232. Although he received the prebend of a chaplainship, and later of the archdeacon in the cathedral chapter of the Diocese of Várad (today Oradea, Romania) in the kingdom, he was in the company of Cardinal Giacomo in Italy between 1236 and 1239. Rogerius quarter, a district in Oradea, Romania, is named after him.

== Sorrowful Lament ==
Master Roger was archdeacon of Várad when the town was captured by the Mongols, who had invaded the kingdom from the east. He fled from the town, "ran away into the forest and hid there as long as" he could. Next, Master Roger arrived in Csanád, but it had also been devastated by the invaders. He was soon captured by the Mongols, but managed to escape as the invaders were withdrawing from Hungary in 1242.

We climbed a tall tree and surveyed the land destroyed by the Tatars that they had not wasted when they first came. What pain! We began to walk across the waste and abandoned land that they had destroyed while retreating. Church towers were our way signs from one place to another and the road they marked for us was rough. The roads and paths had vanished; grass and thorn bushes had taken over. Leeks, purslane, onions and garlic, left in the gardens of the peasants, were, when they could be found, brought to me as the choicest delicacies; the others made do with mallow, houseleek and cowbane roots. We filled our hungry stomach with these and the spirit of life was revived in our drained bodies.

— His Epistle

He went to Rome, where he received the post of archdeacon of Sopron in the western part of the Kingdom of Hungary, Várad having been completely destroyed by the Mongols. He took over his new post in 1243, and set about recording his experiences during the Mongol invasion in a letter written to Cardinal Giacomo. His letter provides a "dramatic description of the events" (Florin Curta) leading to the destruction of the kingdom. Following the death of Cardinal Giacomo in 1244, Master Roger was employed by Cardinal John of Toledo. When he accompanied his new master to the First Council of Lyon in 1245, he was already a canon in the diocese of Zagreb.

== Archbishop of Split ==
Master Roger was appointed archbishop of Split by Pope Innocent IV after the death of Archbishop Ugrin, who had died on April 30, 1249. It seems that both the canons of the cathedral chapter and the locals would have preferred a Dominican friar named John. Finally, King Béla IV of Hungary, the supreme lord of the town, approved the appointment of Roger, who arrived in his seat in February 1250.

He passed through the region of Pannonia, entered Hungary, and then proceeded to the court of King Béla bearing a letter of recommendation from the pope. There he explained the details of the events through which he had been appointed to take charge of the church of Split. His Royal Majesty, in fact, was not all pleased with what had been decided regarding him, and he was quite angry that Roger had been appointed without his knowledge and consent. But he hid his indignation and let the archbishop proceed in peace to his see.

— Archdeacon Thomas of Split: History of the Bishops of Salona and Split

During his more than fifteen years in the archbishopric, he was involved from time to time in conflicts both with his flock and with the monarch. In his last years, Archbishop Roger suffered from gout that also paralyzed him. He was buried in the Cathedral of Saint Domnius.

== Comments and renditions of his work ==
- Carmen Miserabile super Destructione Regni Hungariae per Tartaros, ed., L. Juhasz, in I Szentpetery, ed., Scriptores Rerum Hungaricarum, 2 vols. (Budapest 1937–1938) 11, 543–88;
- German translation by H. Gockenjan in Ungarns Geschichtsschreiber, 111: Der Mongolensturm.
- Russian translation by A. Dosaev in Магистр Рогерий. Горестная песнь о разорении Венгерского королевства татарами. СПб.: Дмитрий Буланин, 2012, 304 с..
- C. de Bridia, Historia Tartarorum, ed., A. Onnerfors (Berlin 1967); an English translation in R.A. Skelton, T.E. Marston, and G.D. Painter, The Vinland Map and the Tartar Relation (New Haven 1965) 54–101.
- William of Rubruck, Itineraarium, ed., A. Van den Wyngart, Sinica Franciscana 1, 147–332; an English translation in Dawson, op. cit. (At n. 6)87-220.

== Footnotes ==
Catholic Church titles
Preceded by John Hahót (elected)	Archbishop of Split; 1249–1266	Succeeded by John Hahót
