= Historia Salonitana =

Historia Salonitanorum atque Spalatinorum pontificum or the History of the Bishops of Salona and Split (Croatian: Povijest biskupa Salone i Splita), commonly known simply as the Historia Salonitana, is a chronicle by Thomas the Archdeacon from the 13th century which contains significant information about the early history of the Croats. The work is available in several scholarly editions and translations, while the English translation is available from 2006.

It was first published by Johannes Lucius. An extended version of this work, known as the Historia Salonitana maior was composed in the 16th century, and critical editions of both have been republished by Nada Klaić (Belgrade: Naucno delo, 1967).

The chronicle gives an account of the arrival of the Croats:

From the Polish territories called Lingonia seven or eight tribal clans arrived under Totilo. When they saw that the Croatian land would be suitable for habitation because in it there were few Roman colonies, they sought and obtained for their duke...The people called Croats...Many call them Goths, and likewise Slavs, according to the particular name of those who arrived from Poland and Bohemia.

This account may be considered more similar to that which is found in De Administrando Imperio than the Chronicle of the Priest of Duklja.

The chronicle notes that by the time of the Byzantine Emperor Heraclius and Pope John IV, some Croats had been converted to Christianity. Both these men died in the mid 7th century, which leaves an estimate of the actual arrival of the Croats to the Adriatic at sometime in the early part of the century.

It provides an extended information about the Croatian kings Demetrius Zvonimir and Peter Krešimir IV.

== Sources ==
- Curta, Florin (2006). Southeastern Europe in the Middle Ages, 500–1250. Cambridge: Cambridge University Press.
- Fine, John Van Antwerp Jr. (1991) [1983]. The Early Medieval Balkans: A Critical Survey from the Sixth to the Late Twelfth Century. Ann Arbor, MI: University of Michigan Press.
- Fine, John Van Antwerp Jr. (1994) [1987]. The Late Medieval Balkans: A Critical Survey from the Late Twelfth Century to the Ottoman Conquest. Ann Arbor, MI: University of Michigan Press.
- Fine, John Van Antwerp Jr. (2006). When Ethnicity did not Matter in the Balkans: A Study of Identity in Pre-Nationalist Croatia, Dalmatia, and Slavonia in the Medieval and Early-Modern Periods. Ann Arbor, MI: University of Michigan Press.
- Perić, Olga; Karbić, Damir; Matijević-Sokol, Mirjana; Sweeney, Ross (2006). Thomae Archidiaconi Spalatensis: Historia Salonitanorum atque Spalatinorum pontificum - Archdeacon Thomas of Split: History of the Bishops of Salona and Split. Budapest: Central European University Press.
