= Carmen miserabile =

Account written by Rogerius of Apulia

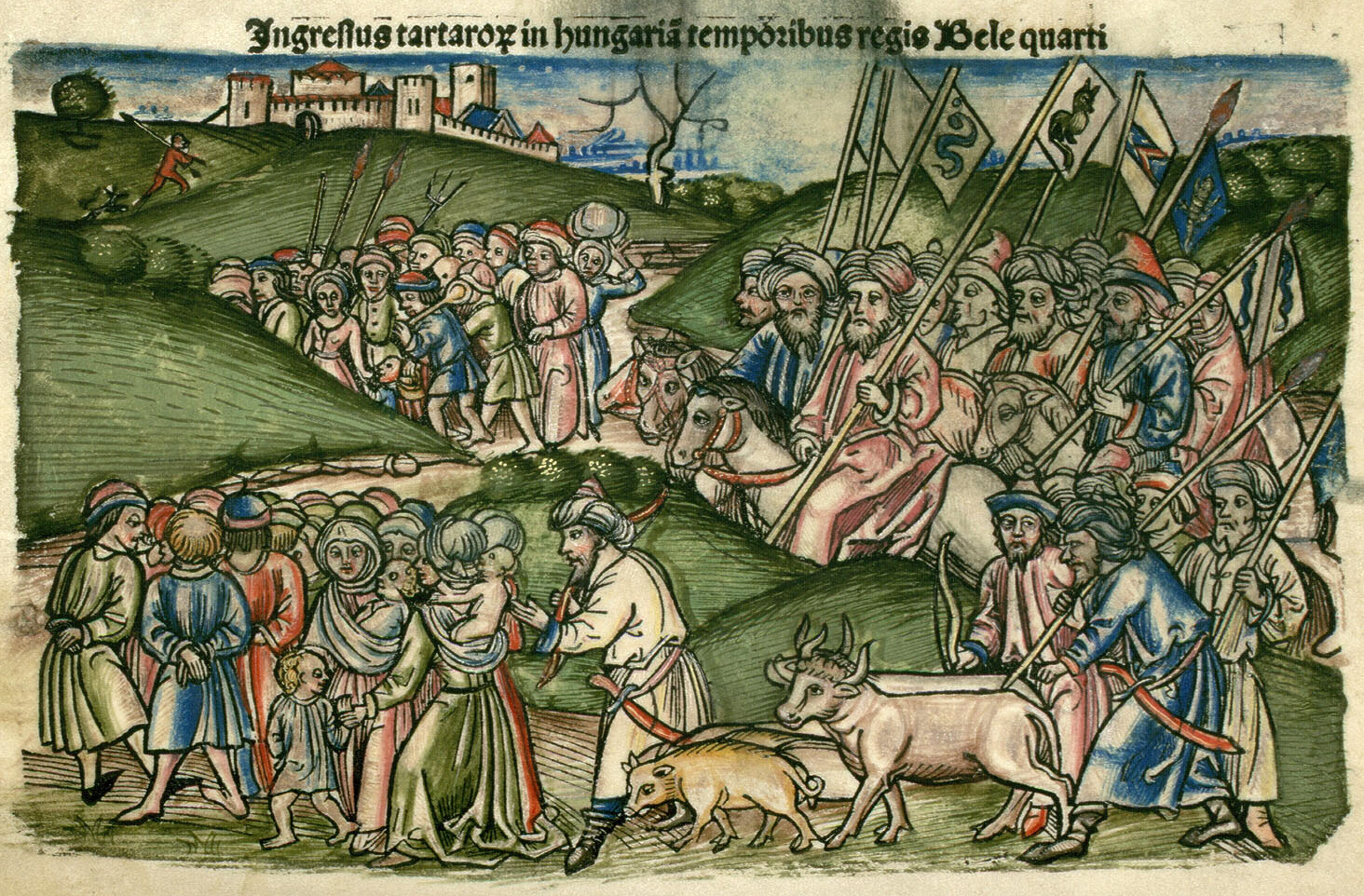
The Carmen miserabile by Master Roger is an appendix at the end of the Thuróczy Chronicle: "The Arrival of Tatars in Hungary During the Time of King Béla the Fourth".

Carmen miserabile super destructione regni Hungariae per Tartaros (Latin for "A mournful song about the destruction of the Kingdom of Hungary by the Tatars.") is an account written by Rogerius of Apulia.

After 1241, Rogerius wrote a description of the conquest of Transylvania and the Great Hungarian Plain by the Tatars in this work. Mongol-Tatar Golden Horde forces led by Batu Khan began attacking Europe in 1223, starting with Kievan Rus. They continued to defeat the German principalities, Polish, and Hungarian armies before turning back to go home in 1241.

== Editions and translations ==
- Carmen Miserabile super Destructione Regni Hungariae per Tartaros, ed., L. Juhasz, in I Szentpetery, ed., Scriptores Rerum Hungaricarum, 2 vols. (Budapest 1937-1938) 11, 543-88;
- Croatian translation by M. Sardelić, Rogerije iz Apulije Carmen miserabile, Matica hrvatska, Zagreb, 2010.
- Czech translation by R. Prážak, in Legendy a kroniky Koruni uherské, eds. Dagmar Bartoňková, Jana Nechutová and Richard Prážak, Praha-Vyšehrad, 1988, 281-303.
- English translation by János M. Bak and Martyn Rady, in Master Roger's Epistle to the Sorrowful Lament upon the Destruction of the Kingdom of Hungary by the Tatars, eds. Rady, Martyn; Veszprémy, László; Bak, János M.; Anonymus and Master Roger; CEU Press, 2010.
- German translation by H. Gockenjan in Ungarns Geschichtsschreiber, 111: Der Mongolensturm;
- Italian translation by Jennifer Radulović, Maestro Ruggero, Carmen miserabile. La distruzione dell’Ungheria ad opera dei Tartari, Genova, Milano: Casa Editrice Marietti, 2012.
- Romanian translation by Gh. Popa-Lisseanu (ed.), in Izvoarele Istoriei Românilor. V., as Rogerius, Carmen miserabile / Cântecul de jale, Bucharest, 1935;
- Russian translation by A. Dosaev in Магистр Рогерий. Горестная песнь о разорении Венгерского королевства татарами. СПб.: Дмитрий Буланин, 2012, 304 с..
