= Thomas the Archdeacon =

Roman Catholic cleric

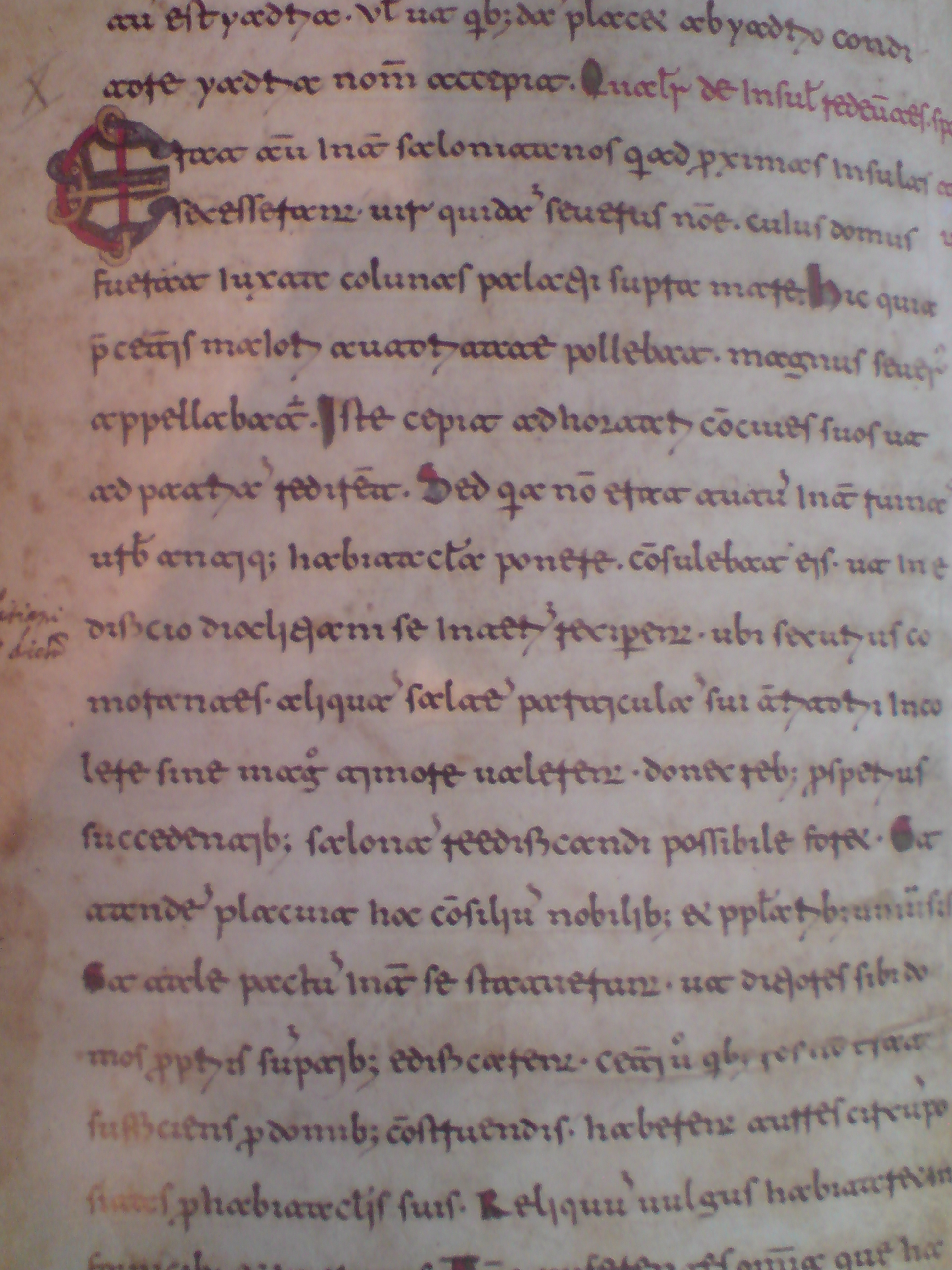
Page from Thomas' Historia Salonitana

Thomas the Archdeacon (Latin: Thomas Archidiaconus; Italian: Tommaso Arcidiacono; Croatian: Toma Arhiđakon; c. 1200 – 8 May 1268), also known as Thomas of Spalato (Latin: Thomas Spalatensis, Hungarian: Spalatói Tamás, Croatian: Toma Splićanin), was a Roman Catholic cleric, historian and chronicler from Split (Spalato). He is often referred to as one of the greatest sources in the historiography of Croatian lands.

== Life ==
What is known about Thomas' life comes from his work, Historia Salonitana. He speaks of his life in the third person and very briefly, in the style of medieval literature genres. Thomas was born in Split at the beginning of the 13th century. It is not known whether he was of noble or common birth, but he represented the elite Roman culture that had survived from before the Slav migration, and he had a negative view of Slavs, often mistakenly conflating them in his chronicle with the Goths. He was probably educated at the cathedral school in Split. Around 1222 he was sent to study at the University of Bologna. There he perfected skills (under, among others, Accursius) in law, rhetoric, gramathic and notary (ars dictandi and ars notaria). He saw Saint Francis of Assisi in Bologna, a remarkable event which he mentioned in his work, describing the person of Saint Francis. Upon returning to his hometown of Split he advanced fast in church hierarchy. He became a notary official in c. 1227, before being appointed archdeacon in 1230. He described the Mongol invasion of Hungary in 1241 and 1242, Mongol customs and homeland, thus creating the first ethnological writings in local historiography. In 1243 a body of canons chose Thomas to be archbishop of Split, however due to his views on Church autonomy in Split, commoners rebelled against him. Fearing for his life, he never occupied that function, and in the end resigned the honor. Because of that, in his work he wrote about future archbishops with bitterness. He died in Split on May 8, 1268. Today, his grave lies in the Church of St. Francis.

== Views ==
Thomas was a stern advocate of medieval commune movement in Split. He wrote about Croatian nobles (and Hungarian kings in his time) in the hinterland of the city with great animosity, because they tried to crush the autonomy of the city (which was one of the Dalmatian city-states). And conversely, he treated fairly those who respected the commune autonomy (Croatian kings, and later, Hungarian kings in the 13th century). In 1239 he organized new („latin“) administration in Split, bringing Gargane de Ascindis from Ancona, as the new Podestà. He was also an advocate of Church autonomy within the city (in accordance with official Roman Church teaching) which excluded commoners and citizens from interfering in Church business (such as the election of the archbishop).

== Work ==
Thomas' only work is the Historia Salonitana, the history of the archbishops of Salona and Split written in Latin. The work is available in several scholarly editions and translations (Croatian, Russian etc.) The English translation is available from 2006.

The work itself is combining three medieval history genres – historia, chronica and memoriale. Eventually, his work outgrows the narrow theme of archbishops, and becomes an outstanding literary achievement which encompasses the whole of the Croatian medieval period up to the 13th century. Because of Thomas' original research in the archbisphopric's archive in Split, he brings facts and news from contemporary documents unknown to modern day historians. His work is therefore not only of great literary value, but also of historical value for Croatian history.

== Sources ==
- Fine, John Van Antwerp Jr. (2006). When Ethnicity did not Matter in the Balkans: A Study of Identity in Pre-Nationalist Croatia, Dalmatia, and Slavonia in the Medieval and Early-Modern Periods. Ann Arbor, MI: University of Michigan Press.
- Perić, Olga; Karbić, Damir; Matijević-Sokol, Mirjana; Sweeney, Ross (2006). Thomae Archidiaconi Spalatensis: Historia Salonitanorum atque Spalatinorum pontificum - Archdeacon Thomas of Split: History of the Bishops of Salona and Split. Budapest: Central European University Press.
- Prozorov, Vadim (2013). "The Tenth Century Councils in Split and the Problem of the Reliability of Their Acts". Црквене студије. 10: 275–287.

Catholic Church titles
Preceded by Stephen (elected)	Archbishop of Split (elected); 1243–1244	Succeeded by Ugrin Csák
