= Golden Bull of 1222 =

Golden bull, or edict, issued by King Andrew II of Hungary

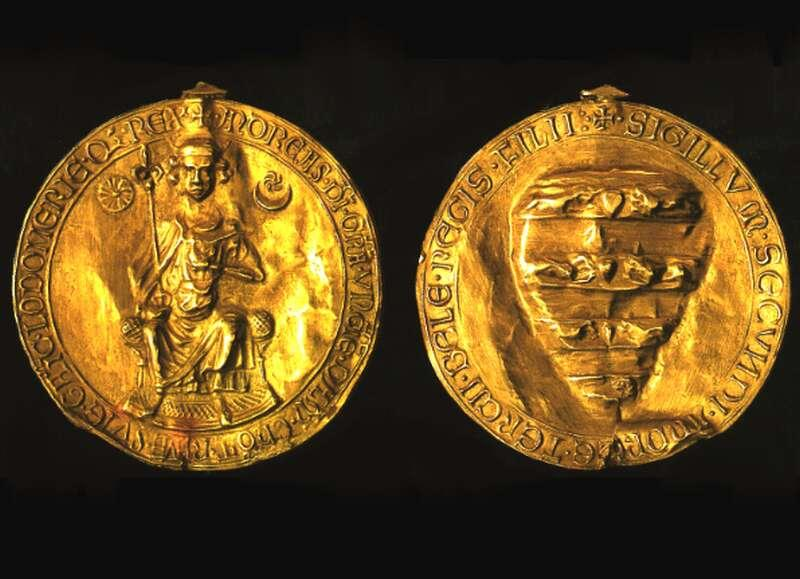
- The golden seal that earned the decree the name
- Created: 1222
- Author(s): Andrew II of Hungary
- Purpose: confirmation of the rights of nobility

The Golden Bull of 1222 was a golden bull, or edict, issued by Andrew II of Hungary. King Andrew II was forced by his nobles to accept the Golden Bull (Aranybulla), which was one of the first examples of constitutional limits being placed on the powers of a European monarch. The Golden Bull was issued at the year 1222 diet of Fehérvár. The law established the rights of the Hungarian nobility, including the right to disobey the King when he acted contrary to law (jus resistendi). The nobles and the church were freed from all taxes and could not be forced to go to war outside of Hungary and were not obligated to finance it. This was also a historically important document because it set down the principles of equality for all of the nation's nobility. Seven copies of the edict were created, one for each of the following institutions: to the Pope, to the Knights Templar, to the Knights Hospitaller, to the Hungarian king itself, to the chapters of Esztergom and Kalocsa and to the palatine.

The charter's creation was influenced by the emergence of a nobility middle class, unusual in the nation's feudal system. As a regular gesture of generosity, King Andrew often donated property to particularly faithful servants, who thereafter gained new economic and class power. With the nation's class system and economic state changing, King Andrew found himself coerced into decreeing the Golden Bull of 1222 to relax tensions between hereditary nobles and the budding middle class nobility.

The Golden Bull is often compared to Magna Carta; the Bull was the first constitutional document of the nation of Hungary, while Magna Carta was the first constitutional charter of the nation of England.

== Background ==
=== Grants of liberties ===
The Golden Bull that Andrew II of Hungary issued in the spring of 1222 is "one of a number of charters published in thirteenth-century Christendom that sought to constrain the royal power." Peter II of Aragon had already in 1205 planned to make concessions to his subjects. Simon de Montfort, supreme commander of the Albigensian Crusade, issued the Statute of Pamiers in 1212, confirming the privileges of the clergymen and limiting the authority of the future rulers of Toulouse and Carcassonne. The statute influenced the Magna Carta of John, King of England, which also secured the liberties of the Church and regulated feudal relationships in 1215. The Holy Roman Emperor, Frederick II, strengthened the authority of the imperial prelates in 1220.

Contacts between Hungary and these countries can be demonstrated during this period. Aragonese nobles settled in Hungary in the early 13th century. Hungarian participants of the Fifth Crusade could meet Robert Fitzwalter and other leaders of the movement which had achieved the issue of the Magna Carta. Two Hungarian prelates visited Canterbury in 1220. However, no direct connection between the texts of the Golden Bull and other early 13th-century grants of liberties can be demonstrated. Historian James Clarke Holt says, there is no need to assume that the authors of these documents borrowed from each other, because all these charters embodied the "natural reaction of feudal societies to monarchical importunity".

=== Hungarian society ===
The existence of at least a dozen distinct social groups can be documented in Hungary in the 12th and 13th centuries. Freemen and serfs were the two fundamental categories, but intermediate "semi-free" groups also existed. Freemen could in theory freely choose their lords, but they were in practice required to remain loyal to their masters. On the other hand, unfree warriors could hold large estates but could face legal arbitrary actions of royal officials.

The highest-ranking royal officials were appointed from among men who regarded themselves the descendants of either the Hungarian chieftains of the period of the establishment of the kingdom or of the foreign warriors who settled in Hungary during the subsequent centuries. They were mentioned as "noblemen" from the end of the 12th century, but they did not form a hereditary elite. The most prominent families started to name themselves after their forefathers in the 1200s, but their genealogies were often fabricated. The Gesta Hungarorum, which was completed around 1200, emphasized that the ancestors of many noblemen played a preeminent role in the Hungarian Conquest of the Carpathian Basin.

Initially, each freeman was required to serve in the royal army. Those who were unable to perform this duty were obliged to pay taxes in the 12th century. The majority of the castle warriors were unfree, but freemen could also choose to serve the ispáns (or heads) of the royal castles. They were to defend the royal castles and accompany the monarchs to their military campaigns in exchange for the parcels they held in royal lands around the castles. Free castle warriors could also retain their own estates. The highest ranking castle warriors started to refer to themselves as "freemen" or "warriors of the holy kings" to emphasize their privileged status.

Thousands of foreigners—Slavs, Germans, Italians and Walloons—came to Hungary to populate the sparsely inhabited lands or to work in the centers of royal administration. These "guests" preserved their personal freedom even if they settled in the estates of the aristocrats or churchmen. Jews could legally settle only in the centers of the bishoprics, but they actually also lived in other towns. They were primarily merchants, engaged in long-distance trade. Muslims and christians who settled in Hungary were employed in the administration of royal revenues, but the presence of Muslim warriors is also documented.

=== Transformation ===
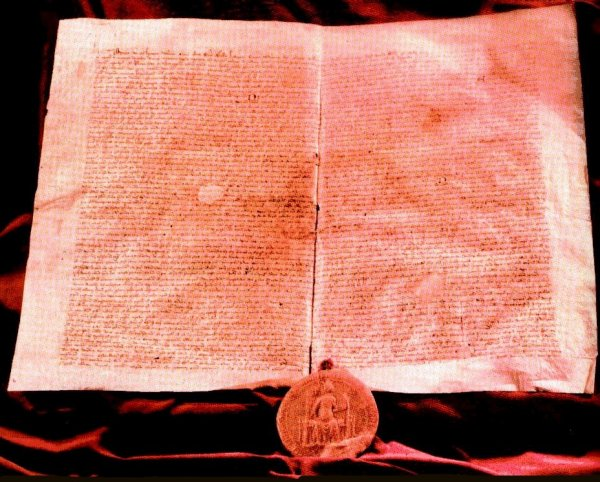
Golden Bull of 1222

Béla III of Hungary, who ruled from 1172 to 1196, was one of the wealthiest European monarchs of his time, according to a summary of his revenues. He earned income from the periodical exchange of coins, royal salt monopoly and customs duties, but significant part of his revenues came from the royal estates, because he owned more than half of landed property in the kingdom. He decreed that each transaction proceeding in his presence was to be recorded, which gave rise to the development of the royal chancellery. Thereafter private transactions were also frequently recorded and preserved at specific monasteries or cathedral chapters, known as "places of authentication".

Béla III's eldest son and successor, Emeric, faced a series of rebellions initiated by his younger brother, Andrew. Both the king and his brother, who seized Croatia and Dalmatia, made generous grants to their partisans to secure their loyalty. Prelates and high-ranking officials supported Andrew against the king, but Emeric defeated his brother. Andrew mounted the throne after the sudden death of Emeric's infant son, Ladislaus III, in 1205.

Andrew appointed his former supporters to the highest offices, but most of his brother's former officials could retain their offices, because he needed their assistance. For instance, four of Andrew's first seven palatines—Csépán Győr and his brother, Pat, Julius Kán and Bánk Bár-Kalán—had held offices already during Emeric's reign. The ispáns of Bács, Sopron, Zala and other important counties were mostly nominated from among Emeric's former supporters. The heads of the royal household—including the master of the horse and the master of the stewards—became the members of the royal council during Andrew's reign. He always appointed one of his old partisans to these new offices.

Andrew started to grant large areas of royal estates and significant sums of money to his former supporters. For instance, Alexander of the Hont-Pázmány clan, who had helped Andrew to flee from his brother's prison, received 300 marks in 1217. Andrew's predecessors had also donated royal estates in perpetuity, but mostly those situated in the borderlands. Breaking with this practise, Andrew gave away large domains which were located in the central regions. The new policy of donations, known as novae institutiones ("new arrangements"), significantly reduced the revenues of the ispáns of the counties, because one third of all royal revenues from their counties were due to them. The "new arrangements" also diminished royal revenues. Andrew introduced new taxes and ordered the exchange of coins twice a year to secure the funds to the maintenance of his royal court. He farmed out the collection of the taxes and the administration of the royal mint to Jews and Muslims.

According to a widespread scholarly theory, the appearance of wealthy landowners in the counties threatened the social position of both the free and unfree royal warriors. Lesser landowners started to emphasize their direct link to the monarch. According to the available sources, landowners from Hosszúhetény were the first to call themselves "freemen and royal servants" during a court case against the abbot of Pécsvárad Abbey in 1212. Andrew started to grant the same status from the 1210s. Royal servants were to serve in the royal army, but independently of the ispáns who were the commanders of the county troops.

"Everyone knows that Hungary has seventy-two counties. The kings of Hungary granted these to meritorious persons and they could be revoked without offending those who held them. Their luxury, wealth and income, power, rank and security came from these counties. However, because of the profligacy of some of ... [some of the] predecessors [of Béla IV of Hungary], their rights over the counties had been diminished to a great extent, since [the kings] had granted in perpetuity properties, villages, and estates belonging to the counties to deserving and undeserving persons alike. Therefore, because of the diminution of the counties the ispáns had no men, and when they marched out, they were taken for simple knights."

— Master Roger's Epistle

Andrew's "new arrangements" stirred up discontent among his subjects. A group of dignitaries made attempts to dethrone him in favor of his cousins in 1209. His wife, Gertrude of Merania, who had persuaded him to make generous grants to her German relatives and courtiers, was assassinated in 1213. He was forced to have his eight-year-old son, Béla, crowned king in 1214. After he left for a crusade to the Holy Land in 1217, his deputy, John, Archbishop of Esztergom, was expelled from Hungary. Andrew returned to Hungary in 1218. Shortly thereafter, his chancellery issued a series of charters which were dated as if he had started to reign in the spring of 1204, thus ignoring the last months of his brother's reign and the entire period of his nephew's rule. According to historian Attila Zsoldos, Andrew wanted to invalidate the royal charters which were issued during the eighteen months before his actual ascension to the throne.

The royal council ordered the revision of the grants concerning the estates of the udvornici (or semi-free peasants) in 1220. Next year, a similar decision was passed about the estates of the castle folk. Andrew was forced to appoint Béla to administer the lands beyond the Drava River in 1220. The noblemen who had lost Andrew's favor assembled in his son's new court.

== 1222 movement ==
The circumstances of the promulgation of the Golden Bull are uncertain because of the lack of sources. The Golden Bull itself is the principal source of the events which forced Andrew to issue it. Royal charters and Pope Honorius III's letters to Hungarian dignitaries provide further information about the political history of the year.

On 4 July 1222, the pope urged the Hungarian prelates to apply ecclesiastical censures against those who had claimed that they did not owe loyalty to Andrew, but to Béla.

The available data suggest that discontented noblemen, many of whom had held high offices during Emeric's reign, staged a coup in the spring of 1222.

In the kingdom of Hungary, it had been decided lately that the entire people should assemble twice a year, and our dear son in Christ, [Andreas], the illustrious king of the Hungarians is bound to appear in person among them. On such occasions the riotous crowd, liable to get confused and to lose its self-control, tends to make demands on the king that are not only unpleasant but may even be unjust, among others they may demand to divest of their offices and honours the magnates and nobles of the realm whom they hate, to expel them from the country and distribute their property among the people. These demands have confused the king, and in order to comply with the demands of the unruly crowd, he is offending against the principles of justice, and is violating peace, which will lead to the weakening of his royal power. He is afraid of refusing to comply with the unjust demands, as this might endanger his life and that of his family.

— Pope Honorius III's Bull of 15 December 1222

The Golden Bull was drafted by Cletus Bél, royal chancellor and provost of Eger.

== Main points of the Bull ==
King Andrew II

"We have also decreed that if We or any of our successors should at any time seek to go against this settlement, both the bishops and the retainers and the nobles of the kingdom, in common or in singularly, now and in the future, have by this authority for ever more the freedom to resist and speak against Us and our successors, without the taint of infeidelity.

Given by the hand of Cletus, chancellor of our court and dean of the church of Eger, in the year of the Incarnation of the World 1222, when the venerable John the Archbishop of Esztergom, the venerable Ugrin the archbishop of Kalocsa, Deserius the Bishop of Csanád, Robert (Bishop) of Veszprém, Thomas (Bishop) of Eger, Stephen (Bishop) of Zagreb, Alexander (Bishop) of Várad, Bartholomew (Bishop) of Pécs, Cosmas (Bishop) of Győr and Briccius (Bishop) of Vác, in the seventeenth year of Our reign."

=== Royal servants' rights ===
More than one third of the articles of the Golden Bull dealt with the grievances of the royal servants. The king promised that the collecta (an extraordinary tax) may collect tax on their estates whereas freemen's pennies (an ordinary tax) may not be collected on their estates. He also pledged that they may accommodate him and his officials. Royal servants who had no sons were granted the right of exchange of their estates in their testaments in return to receive a sum of money and benefits. The Golden Bull limited the judicial power of the ispáns, stating that in the royal servants' estates they could administer justice only in cases concerning the tithe and coinage. Royal servants were exempted of the obligation of accompanying the monarch to military expeditions to foreign lands.

2. Noblemen may be arbitrarily arrested but not oppressed by the desire of any higher power.
3. The Noblemen are declared to be exempt from the payment of taxes, unless seen to be sufficient by the noble courts and their treasuries. Their residences may be occupied, if there is sufficient evidence that they have mishandled the finances of the villages and their accompanying royal servants, and these may only be visited by those who have been invited. Taxes may be levied on the Church.
4. If any nobleman dies without a male heir, his daughter will receive a quarter of his possessions; the remainder of his property shall be given to others, but if, as a result of their deaths, they cannot take possession of these properties, then these properties shall pass into the hands of their closest living relative; if this is not possible, then the King shall inherit them.
7. If the King wishes to send his armies outside of the Kingdom the Noblemen will not be under obligation to go with him, if the monarch doesn't pay them. However, if an invading army enters in the Kingdom, all of them must serve to expel it.
9. The Hungarian Palatine may judge everyone in the Kingdom without any differentiation; but he cannot take try any nobleman without the King's approval.
11. If foreigners arrive in the Kingdom, they must not receive honors and public positions without the Royal Council's approval.
16. No title or public charge can be inherited.
24. The Nobles of the Chamber, collectors of (salt) tax and toll-keepers must be noblemen of the kingdom, neither Ismaelite nor Jews.
26. Hungarian properties cannot be given to foreigners.
30. No-one, besides the Hungarian Palatine, the governors of Croatia and Slavonia, the King and the Queen Consort, can have more than one title or honor.
31. §2 If the king or one of his successor won't keep this agreement the nobilities has right to resist and contradict to the king without consider that act like a treason. In order for this document to be lawful, and implemented in the future, seven copies of it will be made, each sealed with the Golden Seal. The first will be sent to the Pope, the second to the Knights of Saint John, the third to the Templar Knights, the fourth to the King, the fifth to the Archbishop of Esztergom, the sixth to the Archbishop of Kalocsa and the seventh to the Hungarian Palatine, so that these writings won't be falsified or confused.

== See also ==
- Hungarian Diet

== Sources ==
=== Primary sources ===
- Master Roger's Epistle to the Sorrowful Lament upon the Destruction of the Kingdom of Hungary by the Tatars (Translated and Annotated by János M. Bak and Martyn Rady) (2010). In Rady, Martyn; Veszprémy, László; Bak, János M. (2010). Anonymus and Master Roger. CEU Press. ISBN 978-963-9776-95-1.
- The Laws of the Medieval Kingdom of Hungary, 1000–1301 (Translated and Edited by János M. Bak, György Bónis, James Ross Sweeney with an essay on previous editions by Andor Csizmadia, Second revised edition, In collaboration with Leslie S. Domonkos) (1999). Charles Schlacks, Jr. Publishers. pp. 1–11. ISBN 1-884445-29-2.

=== Secondary sources ===
- Berend, Nora; Urbańczyk, Przemysław; Wiszewski, Przemysław (2013). Central Europe in the High Middle Ages: Bohemia, Hungary and Poland, c. 900-c. 1300. Cambridge University Press. ISBN 978-0-521-78156-5.
- Blazovich, László (1999). "The origins of the Golden Bull and its most important provisions as reflected in Hungarian constitutional and legal history". In Besenyei, Lajos; Érszegi, Géza; Pedrazza Gorlero, Maurizio (eds.). De Bulla Aurea Andreae Regis Hungariae MCCXXII. Edizioni Valdonega. pp. 181–190. ISBN 88-85033-36-9.
- Érszegi, Géza (1999). "A history of the genesis of the Golden Bull and how it was handed down through the ages, with comments on its text". In Besenyei, Lajos; Érszegi, Géza; Pedrazza Gorlero, Maurizio (eds.). De Bulla Aurea Andreae Regis Hungariae MCCXXII. Edizioni Valdonega. pp. 191–201. ISBN 88-85033-36-9.
- Holt, James Clarke (1992). Magna Carta. Cambridge University Press. ISBN 0-521-27778-7.
- Kontler, László (1999). Millennium in Central Europe: A History of Hungary. Atlantisz Publishing House. ISBN 963-9165-37-9.
- Kormos, Laszlo (4 October 2005). "Hungary's Golden Bull of 1222". HUNSOR: Ungersk-Svenska Online Källor.
- Makkai, László (1990). "Transformation into a Western-type State, 1196–1301". In Sugár, Péter; Hanák, Péter; Frank, Tibor (eds.). A History of Hungary. Indiana University Press. pp. 23–33. ISBN 0-253-35578-8.
- Molnár, Miklós (2001). A Concise History of Hungary. Cambridge University Press. ISBN 0-521-66142-0.
- Rady, Martyn (2000). Nobility, Land and Service in Medieval Hungary. Palgrave. ISBN 0-333-80085-0.
- Rady, Martyn (2014). "Hungary and the Golden Bull of 1222". Banatica. 24 (II): 87–108. ISSN 1222-0612.
- Ronay, Gabriel (1978). The Tartar Khan's Englishman. Cassel. ISBN 1-84212-210-X.
- Vincent, Nicholas (2012). Magna Carta: A Very Short Introduction. Oxford University Press. ISBN 978-0-19-958287-7.
- Zsoldos, Attila (2011). "II. András Aranybullája [Andrew II's Golden Bull]". Történelmi Szemle (in Hungarian). LIII (1): 1–38. ISSN 0040-9634.
- Zsoldos, Attila (2022). The Golden Bull of Hungary. Arpadiana IX., Research Centre for the Humanities. ISBN 978-963-416-305-3.
