= Desiderius (bishop of Csanád) =

Hungarian prelate (died 1228)

- Bishop of Csanád
- Installed: 1202
- Term ended: 1228
- Predecessor: John
- Successor: Bulcsú Lád
- Other post: Chancellor

Personal details
- Died: 1228
- Denomination: Roman Catholic

Desiderius (Hungarian: Dezső; died 1228) was a prelate in the Kingdom of Hungary in the 12th and 13th centuries, who served as Bishop of Csanád (now Cenad in Romania) between 1202 and 1228. Before that he functioned as chancellor in the royal court of King Emeric.

== Chancellor ==
Desiderius is first appeared in contemporary records as chancellor of the royal court and provost of Szeben (present-day Sibiu, Romania) in 1199. The provostry was founded by Béla III of Hungary for the Transylvanian Saxons about a decade ago. He is mentioned in that capacity, when Emeric transferred the right of patronage of Dénesmonostora (lit. "Denis' monastery") within the gens Becsegergely and the document was issued by chancellor Desiderius. The family monastery located at the border of the dioceses of Csanád and Várad. Throughout in 1200 and 1201, numerous royal charters refer to Desiderius chancellor and provost, who held both offices simultaneously. According to a non-authentic document from 1202, which contains a land donation to the Chapter of Esztergom, Desiderius still held the dignity of chancellor in that year.

== Bishop ==
After his predecessor John elevated to the position of Archbishop of Kalocsa, Desiderius was elected Bishop of Csanád in 1202. His election was confirmed by Pope Innocent III still in that year. His episcopal seal from 1213 on the occasion of a lawsuit between the Pannonhalma Abbey and the serfs of Pressburg (present-day Bratislava, Slovakia) was preserved with the circumscription "CENADIENSIS". Several records of the Regestrum Varadinense indicate Desiderius' involvement in various legal affairs during his episcopate. When Kalán Bár-Kalán, Bishop of Pécs was accused of an incestuous relationship with his niece in early 1204, Desiderius was one of the six bishops who were commissioned by Pope Innocent to conduct an investigation, which cleared Kalán from the charges.

Desiderius accompanied King Andrew II to his first campaign against the Principality of Galicia to recapture the province in 1205 or 1206. Desiderius confronted with papal interests in 1210, when Alexander Hont-Pázmány, the ispán of Somogy County founded a church dedicated to Saint Peter in the territory of the Diocese of Csanád and requested to place it under the direct authority of the Holy See. The bishop resisted against it, thus Pope Innocent instructed Archbishop John of Esztergom to make Desiderius obey. Desiderius also attended the Fourth Council of the Lateran in 1215, along with the two archbishops, and additionally five Hungarian and three Dalmatian bishops. There, Pope Innocent appointed him to judge over the jurisdictional conflict between archbishops John and Berthold. In 1219, Pope Honorius III ordered Desiderius to collect that sum of money from the Diocese of Pécs which previously Bishop Kalán had collected for the purposes of the Fifth Crusade.

Desiderius was present in England on 7 July 1220, when Thomas Becket's remains were moved from his first tomb to a shrine, in the recently completed Trinity Chapel. The event was attended by King Henry III, the papal legate Pandulf Verraccio, the Archbishop of Canterbury Stephen Langton and large numbers of dignitaries and magnates secular and ecclesiastical throughout from Europe. An unidentified Hungarian archbishop (either John of Esztergom or Ugrin Csák of Kalocsa) among the guests is referred by Walter of Coventry in his work Memoriale, when described the events. According to a bull of Pope Honorius III issued on 15 December 1220, Desiderius was robbed by burghers of Pavia when, in the course of a pilgrimage, he traveled through the city on his way back to Hungary. The document narrates the burghers misidentified him with Alexander, Bishop of Várad, who owed significant amounts to them, and seized his golds, horses, clothes and carriage. Pope Honorius called on Alexander to compensate Desiderius for the grievances he had suffered. Historian László Solymosi considered Desiderius was able to participate in the pilgrimage in England because of his affiliation with the Cistercians and for the similar martyrdom of Gerard of Csanád and Thomas Becket.

In 1219, Desiderius accused the Benedictine abbey of Ittebő (today Novi Itebej, Serbia) of coin counterfeiting before the Roman Curia. Previously, Andrew II sold and mortgaged royal estates – including the abbey's benefits – to finance his campaign to the Holy Land, which became part of the wider Fifth Crusade. The monks have escaped from the prosecution. Desiderius reported the news to Pope Honorius and King Andrew and seized the land of the abbey for his diocese, simultaneously. Following that Desiderius established a provostry in the place of the abbey and donated the surrounding villages – Csene, Papd (today parts of the commune of Cenei in Romania) and Ivánkahida – to its secular chapter. Pope Honorius recognized the establishment in 1221. Its first provost Michael is mentioned by contemporary records in 1223 and 1239. The provostry was presumably destroyed during the first Mongol invasion. In the same year (1221), Desiderius had conflict of jurisdiction with Archbishop John of Esztergom over the collection of tithe after the coinage in the Diocese of Csanád. Honorius ruled in favor of John. Since 1221, Desiderius was mentioned in the third place among the Hungarian prelates in the royal charters (including the Golden Bull), preceding only by the two archbishops. Desiderius was granted the right to mint royal coins by 1221. He established the episcopal mintage plausibly in Szeged. Desiderius was among those prelates, who complained to Pope Honorius that the young Béla separated from his wife in the first half of 1222 upon his father's demand.

Thomas of Esztergom died around November 1224, after less than a year of episcopate. The chapter could not agree unanimously about the new archbishop. Two rival factions emerged in the following months: a part of the canons nominated Desiderius, while other members of the college supported James of Nyitra (or Nitra). Pope Honorius refused to recognize both elections. He referred those contradicted the canonical rules of procedure, thus he called for holding new elections, unless himself will appoint an archbishop to administer the province. In the second round, some canons continued to support Desiderius, while other emerging faction nominated archdeacon Thomas. Honorius again annulled the results and ordered four canons as envoys to Rome to represent their chapter by 6 January 1226. However there they failed to agree on a candidate acceptable to everyone, thus Honorius appointed Robert, Bishop of Veszprém as archbishop on 13 March 1226. Upon Desiderius' request, Pope Honorius contributed to increasing the income of the canons of his diocese in November 1226. Desiderius died in late 1228, however, it is possible that he was still alive in early 1229, when Pope Gregory IX asked the opinions of two bishops – the suffragans of Transylvania (Raynald of Belleville) and Csanád who are not called by name – about the establishment of the Diocese of Syrmia.

== Sources ==
- Juhász, Kálmán (1929). "Dezső, csanádi püspök [Desiderius, Bishop of Csanád]". Turul (in Hungarian). 43 (3–4). Magyar Heraldikai és Genealógiai Társaság: 96–105. ISSN 1216-7258.
- Markó, László (2006). A magyar állam főméltóságai Szent Istvántól napjainkig: Életrajzi Lexikon [Great Officers of State in Hungary from King Saint Stephen to Our Days: A Biographical Encyclopedia] (in Hungarian). Helikon Kiadó. ISBN 963-208-970-7.
- Petrovics, István (2024). "Egy figyelemre méltó főpap: Dezső csanádi püspök [A Remarkable Prelate: Desiderius, Bishop of Csanád]". In Kordé, Zoltán; Tóth, Hajnalka (eds.). Etelköztől Mezőkeresztesig. Ünnepi tanulmányok Tóth Sándor László 70. születésnapjára (in Hungarian). Fontes et Libri. Tanulmányok / Studies, SZTE BTK Középkori és Kora Újkori Magyar Történeti Tanszék. pp. 169–182. ISBN 978-963-688-013-2.
- Solymosi, László (2013). "Magyar főpapok angliai zarándoklata 1220-ban [The Pilgrimage of Hungarian Prelates to England in 1220]". Történelmi Szemle (in Hungarian). 55 (4). Hungarian Academy of Sciences: 527–540. ISSN 0040-9634.
- Zsoldos, Attila (2011). Magyarország világi archontológiája, 1000–1301 [Secular Archontology of Hungary, 1000–1301] (in Hungarian). História, MTA Történettudományi Intézete. ISBN 978-963-9627-38-3.

Political offices
Preceded by Katapán	Chancellor; 1199–1201/2	Succeeded by Peter
Catholic Church titles
Preceded by John	Bishop of Csanád; 1202–1228	Succeeded by Bulcsú Lád
