= John (archbishop of Esztergom) =

Hungarian prelate

- Archbishop of Esztergom
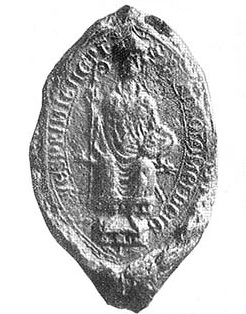
- Seal of John, 1209
- Installed: 6 October 1205
- Term ended: November 1223
- Predecessor: Kalán Bár-Kalán
- Successor: Thomas
- Other posts: Bishop of Csanád; Archbishop of Kalocsa

Personal details
- Died: November 1223
- Denomination: Roman Catholic

John (Hungarian: János; died November 1223) was a prelate in the Kingdom of Hungary in the 12th and 13th centuries. He was Bishop of Csanád (now Cenad in Romania) between 1198 and 1201, Archbishop of Kalocsa from 1202 to 1205 and Archbishop of Esztergom between 1205 and 1223. He crowned Ladislaus III of Hungary, Andrew II of Hungary and Coloman of Galicia as king. Andrew II appointed him to govern the kingdom during his crusade between 1217 and 1218.

== Early career ==
His origin is uncertain; some 19th-century historiographical works consider John was the brother of Queen Gertrude of Merania, King Andrew's consort. This supposition is based on Adam Franz Kollár's 1762 work, the Historiae diplomaticae juris patronatus apostolicorum Hungariae regum libri tres. However Pope Innocent III clearly stated that John was of Hungarian origin ("[...] quae de regno Hungariae originem duceret [...]"), when transferred him from Kalocsa to Esztergom in his papal bull of 6 October 1205, as Nándor Knauz's Monumenta ecclesiae Strigoniensis published the letter.

John first appeared in contemporary records in 1198, when a royal document — a charter of grant of Emeric of Hungary to the Szentgotthárd Abbey — referred to him as Bishop-elect of Csanád. Thus it is presumable that he was elected to the dignity not long before (his immediate predecessor Crispin, however, was last mentioned in 1193). Later in 1198, still he was styled as bishop-elect, when Emeric donated the village of Mihályi to his loyal partisan Ugrin Csák, Bishop of Győr. By the end of the year, his election was confirmed by the newly elected Pope Innocent, who had cordial and cooperative relationship with John. They corresponded with each other in numerous canonical and administrative affairs, which affected the daily operation of the Diocese of Csanád. For instance, John reported that several clergymen and deacons violated the law of clerical celibacy in his bishopric. On 30 January 1199, the pope commissioned Boleslaus, Bishop of Vác, John and an unidentified abbot of Zirc Abbey to investigate a legal dispute between Kalán Bár-Kalán, Bishop of Pécs and the Földvár Abbey after its abbot turned to the Roman Curia, whereafter Kalán questioned the abbey's autonomy, acquired its alleged founding charters by force and imprisoned the abbot. In the same year, John was a member of that papal committee, which investigated the charges against Elvin, Bishop of Várad, who was accused of simony and act of offense by the local chapter. This dissension was a chapter of a wider conflict between the partisans of Emeric and his rebellious brother Duke Andrew.

John was mentioned as bishop in 1199 too, when Emeric transferred the right of patronage of Dénesmonostora (lit. "Denis' monastery") within the gens Becsegergely. The family monastery located at the border of the dioceses of Csanád and Várad. When Emeric prepared a crusade under the pressure of Innocent in the spring of 1201, the pope sent a letter to Duke Andrew, Saul Győr, Archbishop of Kalocsa and John to "put aside the hostility and keep the peace of the realm" (i.e. govern the kingdom under the king's absence). Innocent's instruction reflects John's growing political influence during the last regnal years of Emeric.

== Archbishop of Kalocsa ==
The elderly Saul Győr of Kalocsa died either in 1201 or 1202. He was succeeded by John, who was considered the king's loyal supporter by then. In the same time, Emeric invaded Serbia and helped Stephen Nemanjić's brother Vukan seize the throne, while Emeric himself adopted the title of King of Serbia. This act has increased the ecclesiastical significance of the Archdiocese of Kalocsa, which located along the southern border of the Hungarian kingdom. Pope Innocent had urged the king to take measures to liquidate the Bosnian Church (often called Bogomils or Patarenes), whom the Catholic Church considered to be heretics. To avert the Hungarian attack, Ban Kulin of Bosnia held a public assembly on 8 April 1203 and affirmed his loyalty to Rome in the presence of papal legate John de Casamaris, while the faithful abjured their mistakes and committed to following the Roman Catholic doctrine. Following that King Emeric and Archbishop John held talks with Ban Kulin's unidentified son, the "heretic" envoys (priests Ljubin and Dragota) and the papal representative at Csepel Island. On 30 April, the envoys and Kulin's son confirmed their oath of allegiance before John and Kalán Bár-Kalán.

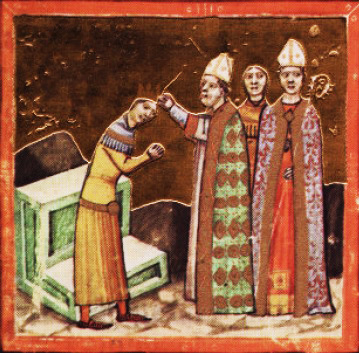
John crowns Ladislaus III, as depicted in the Illuminated Chronicle

In the same time, John participated in the intention of prepare the church union between the Serbian Church (then still subordinated to the Ecumenical Patriarchate of Constantinople) and the Roman Catholic Church. After Emeric's successful military campaign, Pope Innocent assigned the territory of Serbia as a suffragan diocese to the Archbishopric of Kalocsa. On 22 March 1203, the pope appointed John as the papal representative of the issue and sent to the court of the Hungarian vassal Vukan, Grand Prince of Serbia. John was mandated to negotiate in Ras and convert Vukan, the Serbian courtiers, noblemen and clergy, releasing them from obedience to the Patriarch. Pope Innocent simultaneously sent a letter to Vukan, where he declared that the arriving John negotiates on his behalf and represents the interests of the Roman Curia. In this assignment, John has not achieved substantial success; the pope expressed his disappointment that did not hear of any positive developments in his letter to Emeric in the next year. On 25 February 1204, Innocent entrusted his Bulgarian legate Cardinal Leo Brancaleone to extend his operation over Serbia too. In 1205, John sought to merge the "heretic" diocese in the "land of the sons of knez Belo" to the Roman Catholic Church, which laid south of the archbishopric (possibly in Serbia at the border). Theologian József Udvardy considered that this "Belo" is identical with the late Ban Beloš. On 3 May, Innocent approved the intention. Nevertheless, the papal policy remained inefficient, and later the autocephalous Serbian Orthodox Church emerged by 1219, under the influence of Stefan the First-Crowned and his brother Saint Sava, its first archbishop.

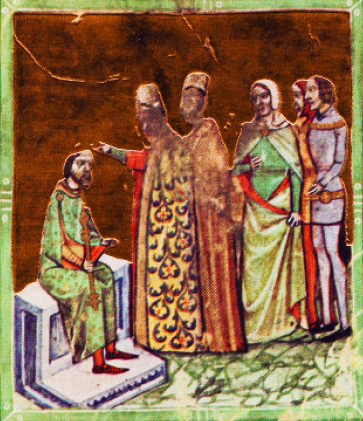
John crowns Andrew II, as depicted in the Illuminated Chronicle

During the short episcopate of John, the tension between the sees Esztergom and Kalocsa over the diverging views in the question of primacy jurisdiction reached its peak. It appears that John tried to take advantage of the situation that Emeric's relationship with Job, Archbishop of Esztergom has deteriorated drastically, most likely because he remained neutral in the power struggle between the king and his younger brother, and stayed away from the secular affairs. Meanwhile, John was considered a loyal partisan of Emeric. Some scholars argue Job pronouncedly turned against the monarch and joined Duke Andrew's court, as Emeric referred to Job as his "enemy" in his letter to Pope Innocent around 1202, when offered the royal provostries and abbeys under the supervision of Esztergom to Rome directly. Under these conditions, the rivalry between Esztergom and Kalocsa became part of a wider secular power struggle in Hungary. An episode of this conflict was recorded, when Job's episcopal blessing in a royal church, which laid in the territory of the Archdiocese of Esztergom, was interrupted by John "with noiseness", who marched into the cathedral with his entourage and blessed the people himself. On another occasion, John entrusted his two suffragan bishops to consecrate churches which belonged to Esztergom. John unduly wore pallium and used archiepiscopal cross during Masses. Under the pretext of Bogomilism along the southern boundary, Job requested Pope Innocent to receive a mandate of apostolic legate regarding the territory of the whole kingdom (i.e. also the Archdiocese of Kalocsa), when personally visited the Roman Curia in Palestrina (or Praeneste). Upon receiving Emeric's letter, Innocent refused this, but issued three bulls on 5 May 1203, which confirmed the privileges of the Archdiocese of Esztergom, including the right of coronation, delivering sacraments to the monarch and the royal family, the superintendence over the royal provostries and churches, ecclesiastical jurisdiction over the royal officials and the collection and reallocation of the tithe from the royal treasury. Beside that Innocent appointed a court (with the participation of Boleslaus, Bishop of Vác, for instance) to investigate John's "indecent behavior" during the conflict. The judgment of the body is unknown.

Archbishop Job died on 1 February 1204. Emeric, who intended to go on a pilgrimage to the Holy Land, did not want to leave his country in uncertainty. Having fallen seriously ill, Emeric wanted to ensure the succession of his four-year-old son, Ladislaus. However Job's successor, archbishop-elect Ugrin Csák died before the coronation. As a result, the event was performed by John of Kalocsa on 26 August 1204. The dying king set his brother free and made him regent for the period of Ladislaus's minority. On 30 November 1204, King Emeric died, and Ladislaus III succeeded him. Pope Innocent sent a letter to Duke Andrew, warning him to respect the child king's interests. In April 1205, the pope sent a letter to John, who became de facto head of the Church in Hungary, and other prelates to support Ladislaus and his mother Queen Constance of Aragon. John was also commissioned to excommunicate the minor Ladislaus' enemies. Considering her son's position to be insecure, Constance fled to Austria, taking Ladislaus with her. The young king suddenly died there on 7 May 1205. Following that John crowned Andrew king in Székesfehérvár on 29 May 1205.

== Archbishop of Esztergom ==
=== Controversial election ===
After the death of Ugrin Csák, the Cathedral Chapter of Esztergom requested (postulatio) Pope Innocent to appoint John as their new archbishop in the summer of 1204. The dying Emeric also supported their choice. In accordance with the canon law (jus canonicum), the canons' procedure was necessary as John was already consecrated as bishop. In this case, the pope had the right to transfer the prelate from a diocese to another one. The dispute over the fill the position of Archbishop of Esztergom became a precedential event in the legal history of the Church, as the case and the following papal decretal ("Bone Memorie") appears among the glosses in English canonist Lawrence Somercotes' Tractatus.

The cathedral chapter refused to invite the bishops of the suffragan dioceses of the Archbishopric of Esztergom to participate in the election process, referring to the canon law. According to the chapter's narration, the bishops were invited by the provost to ensure uniform approval, but they refused to attend and write an approval letter to Pope Innocent. Thus the canons did not recognize the bishops' right to vote, but their subsequent approval rights. In response, four suffragan bishops – Kalán of Pécs, Boleslaus of Vác, Kalanda of Veszprém and John of Nyitra (Nitra) – wrote a letter to the pope, where they claimed the archbishops were elected jointly by the chapter and the bishops in accordance with the spirit of customary law since King St. Stephen (the Archdiocese of Esztergom had six suffragan dioceses during that time; Katapán, Bishop of Eger kept himself away from the conflict, while the Diocese of Győr was in the status of sede vacante since early 1204). The four bishops, in addition of his origin outside the ecclesiastical province of Esztergom, also recalled John's activity as Archbishop of Kalocsa, when he had repeatedly attacked the privileges and acquired rights of Esztergom, causing unrest and destabilization. They argued John was inadequate to protect these prerogatives and they were afraid of possible revenge for previous grievances. In the same time, the canons sent their delegation to Rome to request the confirmation of John's nomination (as the canon law has forbidden the translation of bishops). The delegation consisted of the provost of Pressburg, the treasurer of Esztergom and two royal envoys – the abbot of Bakonybél and magister Peter (possibly identical with chronicler Anonymus), to strengthen John's position and emphasize the friendly relationship between him and Emeric.

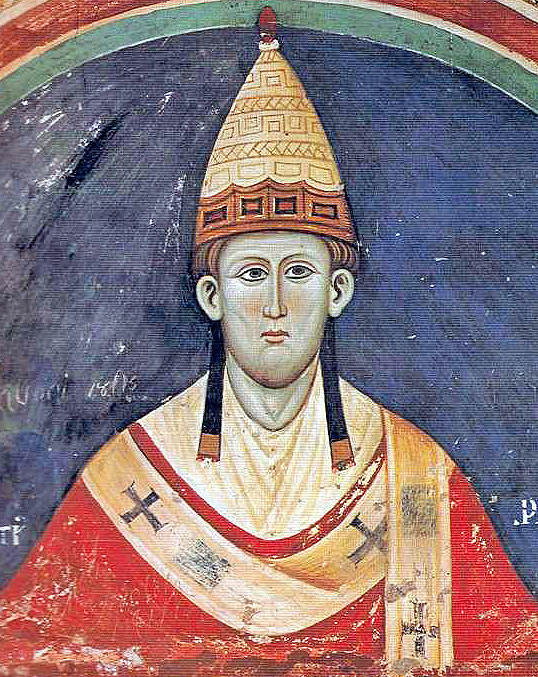
Pope Innocent III (fresco)

However the political situation changed when Emeric died on 30 November 1204. Duke Andrew, who governed the kingdom as his nephew's regent, had a tense relationship with Innocent, who has always been opposed to his rebellions against his brother. Andrew immediately sent a letter with discourteous tone to the pope to inform him about developments and to promise that he will continue Emeric's launched measures, including the support of John's candidacy. He urged the pope to transfer John "without delay". By that time, on 22 November 1204, Pope Innocent III ordered both sides to send their representatives to Rome to deadline of 7 February 1205. The pope was infuriated by the fact that John had celebrated the coronation of Ladislaus III, violating the privileges of Esztergom (which also strengthened the arguments of the canons' representatives). Innocent postponed the decision to February 1205 and encouraged the parties to conclude a compromise, thus the pope refused to confirm John's nomination for the time being.

Upon hearing of the pope's decision, some members of the Cathedral Chapter of Esztergom gathered and withdrew their support from John, who also lost his strongest promoter, King Emeric. Around December 1204 or January 1205, they elected Kalán Bár-Kalán for the position of Archbishop of Esztergom. His candidacy was also supported by Duke Andrew, but the majority of the canons and the suffragan bishops (excepting John of Nyitra) did not recognize the legitimacy of the election. Andrew sent a letter around February 1205 to Innocent to request the confirmation of Kalán, who was considered Andrew's loyal partisan during his struggles against the late Emeric. Formerly Kalán had numerous scandals; for instance, he was accused of incestuous relationship with his niece, but the investigation conducted by his six fellow bishops cleared him. Nevertheless, Innocent refused to confirm Kalán's election, because of shortcomings in the election process. In his letter to the chapter (22 June 1205), Innocent ordered the canons to elect or unanimously nominate their archbishop within a month, and obtain the support of the suffragan bishops too, "if it is required" in Hungary. If they fail to do it, the pope himself will appoint an archbishop to administer the province, as the letter wrote. In June 1205 (before receiving the pope's order), the chapter summoned and nominated John as archbishop again, in accordance with the 22 November 1204 instructions. Three suffragan bishops, Boleslaus, Kalanda and Peter, Bishop-elect of Győr expressed to support John without reservations, while John of Nyitra was forced to write a letter to Innocent, in which he stated that he will withdraw his support from Kalán if the pope does not accept his protegee's nomination. Among the prelates, only Kalán contested the outcome of the election, even Andrew (now as king) acquiesced in that decision. Following that the chapter sent their five-member delegation to the Roman Curia, also delivering the king's support message. However Kalán's supporters again nominated their patron, excluding the rivals from the controversial procedure. They referred to Innocent's second letter (it has since arrived to the realm), which provided for the holding of new election. John's supporters lost their eligibility for election, when rejected to attend, they argued.

Pope Innocent III listened to both candidates' representatives and issued a papal decretal on 6 October 1205, called "Bone Memorie". He decided the conflict over the archbishopric of Esztergom in favor of John and confirmed his election. The pope argued there was no "one undoubtedly suitable candidate", but John was supported with convincing proportions both times during the assemblies. The pope also emphasized that he did not intend to appoint a foreign prelate. John was allowed to relocate his pallium from Kalocsa to Esztergom. On 14 October, Innocent sent a letter for reassurance of the Chapter of Kalocsa. He assured the canons that the archdiocese' dignity and rights will not undermined. John was succeeded as Archbishop of Kalocsa by Berthold, Queen Gertrude's brother in the following year. The case of John's election became part of the 13th-century decretal collections through Compilatio tertia (contains the documents of the first twelve years of the pontificate of Innocent III) and Liber extra. The next time when an archbishop was transferred to an equal archdiocese occurred in 1396, when English prelate Thomas Arundel was translated from York to Canterbury.

=== Conflicts of jurisdiction ===
Ironically, John became a dedicated defender of the church privileges of Esztergom after his election, when he confronted with the influential Berthold in numerous occasions. The queen's brother was tacitly supported by his brother-in-law King Andrew II in his efforts. Upon John's request, Pope Innocent confirmed his dignity's right of the coronation of the Hungarian monarch in 1209. However Berthold used his family relationships and influence in the royal court to put John under pressure. Amidst these circumstances, John was inclined to reach agreement in 1211: the two archbishops entrusted Robert, Bishop of Veszprém and Peter, Bishop of Győr to prepare a convention draft and submit to the Roman Curia. The proposal contained that the right of coronation should belong to the role of archbishop Esztergom, except in case of deliberate rejection, obstacle, deteriorated health condition or sede vacante, when the process must be performed by the archbishop of Kalocsa. The so-called "second coronations" (during festive events) must be celebrated jointly. In addition, the document attached the collection of tithe after the coinage to Esztergom, but John had to waive his all right (i.e. superintendence over the royal churches, abbeys and provostries, ecclesiastical jurisdiction over the royal officials) in the territory of the church province of Kalocsa, in accordance with the proposal. The theses of the document was promoted by Andrew II himself too.

However the canons of Esztergom sharply protested against the agreement. They sent their legation to Rome to ask the pope to refuse to confirm the document. On 12 February 1212, Innocent issued a bull dedicated to Andrew, John and the chapter, in which he refused to countersign the document, referring to its "harmful consequences" for the Kingdom of Hungary. The pope also rejected the intention of Andrew to create a suffragan diocese of Szeben (today Sibiu, Romania) under the supervision of Berthold to the place of the eponymous provostry, which administratively affiliated to the Archdiocese of Esztergom. This purpose was strongly opposed by John and William, Bishop of Transylvania. Nevertheless, John had several conflicts of jurisdiction with Berthold in the following years (for instance, in 1215, according to a letter from Pope Innocent), who left Hungary only in 1218, when he was appointed as Patriarch of Aquileia. In 1219, Pope Honorius III rebuked John, because he unduly exercised jurisdiction over royal churches in the archdiocese of Kalocsa, in violation of the privilege of the newly elected Ugrin Csák, Archbishop of Kalocsa. Honorius emphasized in his rescript that "the equal [archbishop] can not have power over the equal [archbishop]".

John also had a tense relationship with Robert of Veszprém since the 1210s. Robert was the main preparer and submitter to the draft, which sought to reduce the privileges of Esztergom, despite that John was his metropolitan archbishop. They had conflicts in the subject of superintendence over the provostry of Óbuda, and the jurisdiction over the clerical staff in the royal court (mostly resided in Óbuda), in addition to the right of coronation of the queen consorts. The debate has been intensified during the marriage of Andrew II and his second spouse Yolanda de Courtenay in February 1215. Their wedding was celebrated in Székesfehérvár and John crowned Yolanda queen consort. In response, Robert sent a complaint to Pope Innocent III, because the coronation of the queens consort in Hungary had been traditionally the privilege of his see, according to his narration. After Robert's personal visit in Rome, the pope sent two legates, cardinals Pelagio Galvani and Stefano di Ceccano to Hungary in order to investigate the complaint and confirmed the privilege of the See of Veszprém in April 1216. The decision was confirmed by Honorius in 1220 too. John had disagreement in 1221 with Desiderius, his successor in the post of Bishop of Csanád, over the collection of tithe after the coinage in the diocese. Honorius ruled in favor of John.

=== Secular affairs ===
John's relationship with Andrew II and his courtiers was ambiguous and fluctuating due to his former pro-Emeric standpoint and the confrontation against Berthold of Merania. After his accession to the throne, Andrew introduced a new policy for royal grants, which he called "new institutions" in one of his charters. He distributed large portions of the royal domain—royal castles and all estates attached to them—as inheritable grants to his supporters, declaring that "the best measure of a royal grant is its being immeasurable". In addition to the Hungarian lords, his "new institutions" altered the relations between the royal court and the prelacy, whose secular influence has decreased due to the increasingly enormous wealth of the laic power sphere. Furthermore, the employment of Jews and Muslims to administer the royal revenues led Andrew into conflict with the Holy See and the Hungarian prelates. John "deeply disapproved" Andrew's policy, according to the narration of a royal charter. Despite that his archdiocese was granted the village of Gerla (today Gerlachov, Slovakia) in 1206, which belonged to Bars Castle before that. However, around the same time, Andrew confiscated the estate of Tardos in Esztergom County from the chapter due to John's behaviour. The controversial relationship between the royal court and the archdiocese is well represented by that royal donation, when Andrew gifted annually 100 silver denari to the chapter to commemorate his coronation since 1206. As another example, the king granted the port tariff of Kakat (present-day Štúrovo, Slovakia) to the archdiocese in 1215.

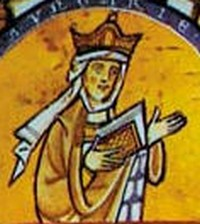
Contemporary depiction of Queen Gertrude

Queen Gertrude has gained considerable influence in the royal court. Andrew granted large domains to her brother Bishop Egbert in the Szepesség region (now Spiš, Slovakia), while Berthold was made Ban of Croatia and Dalmatia in 1209. Andrew's generosity towards his wife's German relatives and courtiers discontented the local lords. When the king departed for a new campaign against Galicia in summer 1213, taking advantage of his absence, Hungarian lords who were aggrieved at Queen Gertrude's favoritism towards her German entourage captured and murdered her and many of her courtiers in the Pilis Hills on 28 September. John's participation in the assassination is unclear. His involvement in the murder is mentioned by Italian scholar Boncompagno da Signa's tractate Rhetorica novissima, Alberic of Trois-Fontaines' Chronica and Matthew of Paris' Chronica Majora and Historia Anglorum. These works unanimously note John's famous phrase in his letter to Hungarian nobles planning the assassination of Gertrude: "Reginam occidere nolite timere bonum est si omnes consentiunt ego non contradico", can be roughly translated into "Kill Queen you must not fear will be good if all agree I do not oppose". The meaning is highly dependent on punctuation: either the speaker wishes a queen killed ("Kill Queen, you must not fear, will be good if all agree, I do not oppose") or not ("Kill Queen you must not, fear will be good, if all agree I do not, oppose"). Historian László Veszprémy considers the anecdote first appeared in the Annales iuvavenses (or "Annals of Salzburg") after an oral spread among the lower clergymen. On the other hand, Tamás Körmendi argues the ambiguous letter was subscribed as a result of a subsequent insertion. It is possible that Boncompagno heard the story in the Roman Curia and incorporated it into his rhetoric dissertation and textbook (published in 1235, the first written source of John's alleged letter). Both Boncompagno and Alberic mention that Andrew accused John of participating in the murder before the Holy See. However Pope Innocent, pointing out the correct use of commas, acquitted the archbishop from the charges. These references emphasize the letter's unintended ambiguity and, thus, John's approval of murder. Körmendi emphasizes the historiographical doubts regarding the authenticity of the letter, as John retained his influence in the upcoming years after the assassination. It is also unlikely that John's proverb was revealed after his active political role, as the anecdote's other protagonist Pope Innocent III died on 16 July 1216. Furthermore, Körmendi argues the preservation of the letter would have been irrational step, moreover the majority of the Hungarian nobility were illiterate during that time. Already 19th-century historian László Nogáll doubted the authenticity of the anecdote.

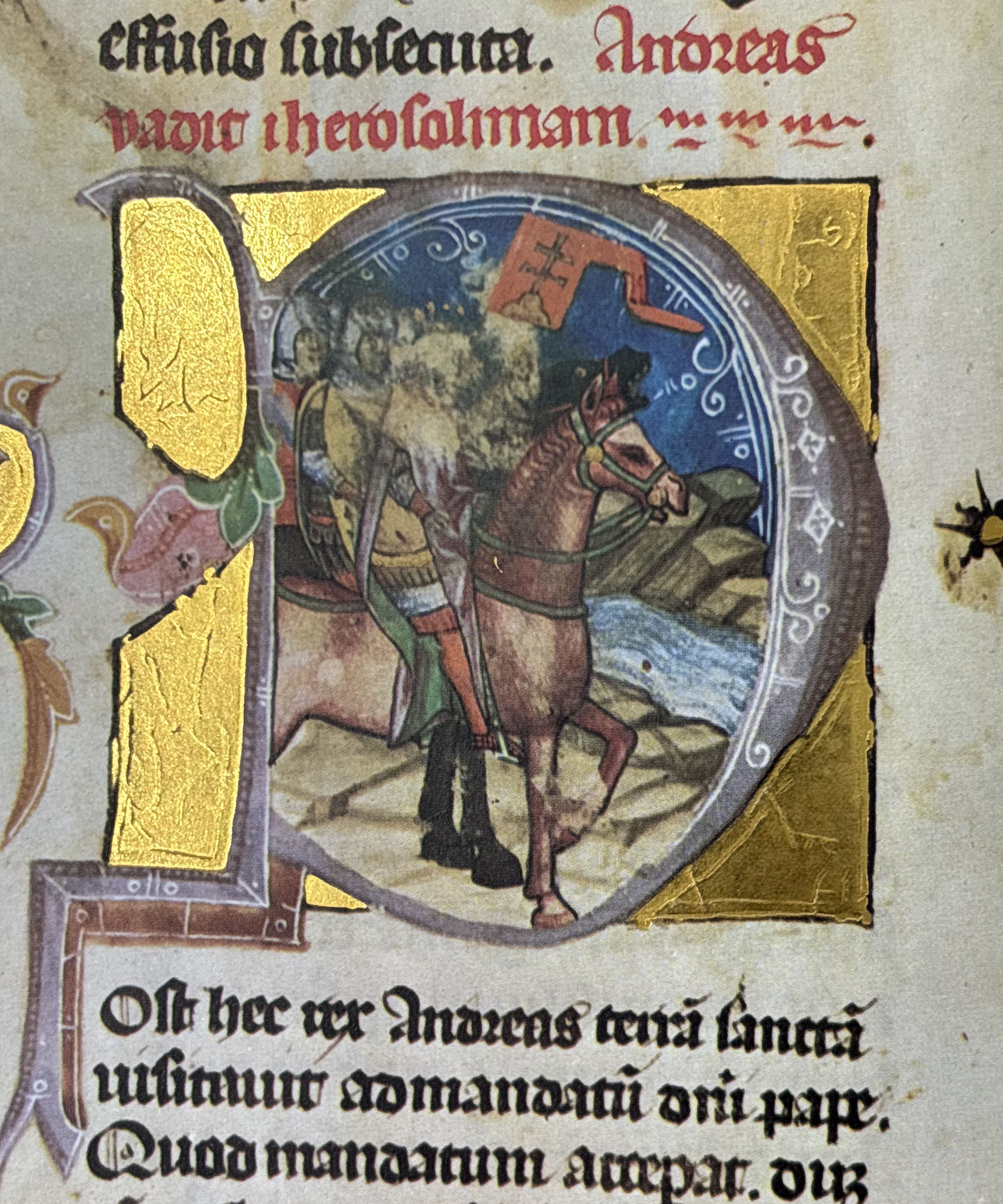
Andrew at the head of his crusader army (from the Illuminated Chronicle)

Andrew sent a letter in 1214 to Pope Innocent, requesting him to authorize John to anoint his younger son Coloman as king of Galicia. Coloman was crowned by John with the pope's authorization possibly in early 1216. Pope Honorius mentioned in a letter in 1222 that John had crowned Coloman "with the blessing of the Holy See", but the circumstances of the ceremony are unknown. Around the same time Andrew II requested Innocent to exempt John from the obligation to participate in the Fourth Council of the Lateran as he intended to fulfill his father's vow to lead a crusade and wished to leave his family and the realm in the care of Archbishop John. Innocent refused that as John took part in the ecumenical council in 1215, along with Berthold, six Hungarian and three Dalmatian bishops. When Pope Honorius III once again called upon Andrew to fulfill his father's vow to lead a crusade in July 1216, the king, who had postponed the crusade at least three times (in 1201, 1209 and 1213), finally agreed. Departing from Hungary in July 1217, Andrew II appointed John as regent to govern the kingdom during the Fifth Crusade. The land of Tardos was returned to the Archdiocese of Esztergom on this occasion. However both John and Palatine Julius Kán proved to be incapable to prevent the spread of anarchic conditions. When he returned to Hungary by late 1218, Andrew complained to Pope Honorius that his kingdom was "in a miserable and destroyed state, deprived of all of its revenues." A group of barons had even expelled Archbishop John from Hungary. According to Andrew's letter, John was obedient to morality rather than rebelled lords' demands and "wickedness", thus he was imprisoned and exiled "in the midst of great injustice and shame", while his wealth was confiscated by "these tyrants". John spent months of exile until Andrew's return. The king emphasized John and his canons' steadfast fidelity and bravery. As compensation, Andrew donated the vineyards of Pográny (today Pohranice, Slovakia) and other landholdings (for instance, Gamás, Kapoly and Lulla) in Somogy County to John in 1218. The Chapter of Esztergom was granted the land of Alvinc (today Vințu de Jos, Romania) and its udvornici in the next year.

=== Last years ===
John consecrated Bartholomew le Gros, who arrived to Hungary with Queen Yolanda, as Bishop of Pécs in 1219. The canons of the cathedral chapter of Pécs attempted to prevent Bartholomew's installation by stating that he was too young for this position. Pope Honorius punished John with sanctions because of his involvement in the appointment, prohibiting the free use of the archdiocese's income and his right of consecration in the Diocese of Pécs. Accordingly, John had to ask for permission to cover the necessary expenses from the pope's two appointed trustees, bishops Thomas of Eger and his old antipode Robert of Veszprém. However an official inquiry ordered by the Holy See ascertained that the new bishop had already attained 30 years, the age required by canon law. After that John was acquitted of the charges and regained the right to financial supervision. In the same year, the consecration of Cosmas, Bishop of Győr also proved to be problematic, as Honorius withdrew John's right to appoint the next bishop in Győr.

It is possible that John was present in England on 7 July 1220, when Thomas Becket's remains were moved from his first tomb to a shrine, in the recently completed Trinity Chapel. The event was attended by King Henry III, the papal legate Pandulf Verraccio, the Archbishop of Canterbury Stephen Langton and large numbers of dignitaries and magnates secular and ecclesiastical throughout from Europe. Alongside Langton and Guillaume de Joinville, Archbishop of Reims, an unidentified Hungarian archbishop among the guests is referred by Walter of Coventry in his work Memoriale, when described the events. This archbishop may have been John, at whose seat in Esztergom there was a provostry erected in the honour of Thomas Becket. Due to John's advanced age, historian Gábor Thoroczkay considers Walter's narration refers to Ugrin Csák of Kalocsa, who was much younger than John. Beside John or Ugrin, Desiderius of Csanád also attended the celebration, who was robbed by burghers of Pavia on his way back.

John gradually retired from public life since the early 1220s, while Ugrin Csák, also a former chancellor, has gained influence in the royal court. During the resistant movement which led to the issue of the Golden Bull of 1222 by Andrew II, John remained passive, even when Pope Honorius urged the Hungarian prelates to apply ecclesiastical censures against those who had claimed that they did not owe loyalty to Andrew, but to Béla, the king's eldest son and heir. John died in November 1223.

== Sources ==
- Engel, Pál (2001). The Realm of St Stephen: A History of Medieval Hungary, 895–1526. I.B. Tauris Publishers. ISBN 1-86064-061-3.
- Érszegi, Géza; Solymosi, László (1981). "Az Árpádok királysága, 1000–1301 [The Monarchy of the Árpáds, 1000–1301]". In Solymosi, László (ed.). Magyarország történeti kronológiája, I: a kezdetektől 1526-ig [Historical Chronology of Hungary, Volume I: From the Beginning to 1526] (in Hungarian). Akadémiai Kiadó. pp. 79–187. ISBN 963-05-2661-1.
- Juhász, Kálmán (1930). A csanádi püspökség története alapításától a tatárjárásig (1030–1242) [The History of the Diocese of Csanád from its Foundation to the Mongol Invasion (1030–1242)] (in Hungarian). Csanádvármegyei Könyvtár 19–20.
- Koszta, László (1991). "Adalékok az esztergomi és a kalocsai érsekség viszonyához a 13. század elején [The Relation of the Archdiocese of Esztergom to that of Kalocsa up to the Beginning of the 13th Century]". Magyar Egyháztörténeti Vázlatok (in Hungarian). 3 (1): 73–88. ISSN 0865-5227.
- Körmendi, Tamás (2014). "A Gertrúd királyné elleni merénylet körülményei [The Circumstances of the Murder of Queen Gertrude]". In Majorossy, Judit (ed.). Egy történelmi gyilkosság margójára. Merániai Gertrúd emlékezete, 1213–2013 (in Hungarian). Ferenczy Museum, Szentendre. pp. 95–124. ISBN 978-963-9590-77-9.
- Nogáll, László (1892). "I. János esztergomi érsek (1205–1223) [Archbishop John I of Esztergom (1205–1223)]". Magyar Sion (in Hungarian). 6: 8–31.
- Solymosi, László (2013). "Magyar főpapok angliai zarándoklata 1220-ban [The Pilgrimage of Hungarian Prelates to England in 1220]". Történelmi Szemle (in Hungarian). 55 (4). Hungarian Academy of Sciences: 527–540. ISSN 0040-9634.
- Sweeney, James Ross (1993). "III. lnce és az esztergomi érsekválasztási vita. (A Bone Memorie II. dekretális történeti háttere) [Pope Innocent III and the Dispute Over the Election of Archbishop of Esztergom. Background to the Papal Decretal of Bone Memorie II]". Aetas (in Hungarian). 8 (1). Translated by Sebők, Ferenc. AETAS Könyv- és Lapkiadó Egyesület: 147–169. ISSN 0237-7934.
- Thoroczkay, Gábor (2016). Ismeretlen Árpád-kor: Püspökök, legendák, króniák [The Unknown Age of the Árpáds: Bishops, Legends and Chronicles] (in Hungarian). L'Harmattan. ISBN 978-963-414-212-6.
- Udvardy, József (1991). A kalocsai érsekek életrajza (1000–1526) [Biographies of Archbishops of Kalocsa, 1000–1526] (in Hungarian). Görres Gesellschaft.
- Zsoldos, Attila (2011). Magyarország világi archontológiája, 1000–1301 [Secular Archontology of Hungary, 1000–1301] (in Hungarian). História, MTA Történettudományi Intézete. ISBN 978-963-9627-38-3.

Catholic Church titles
Preceded by Crispin	Bishop of Csanád; 1198–1201	Succeeded by Desiderius
Preceded by Saul Győr	Archbishop of Kalocsa; 1202–1205	Succeeded by Berthold
Preceded by Kalán Bár-Kalán (elected)	Archbishop of Esztergom; 1205–1223	Succeeded by Thomas
