= Cosmas (bishop of Győr) =

Hungarian bishop

- Bishop of Győr
- Appointed: 1219
- Term ended: 1222
- Predecessor: Peter
- Successor: Gregory

Orders
- Consecration: by John, Archbishop of Esztergom

Personal details
- Died: after 1222

Cosmas (Hungarian: Kozma; died after 1222) was a Hungarian prelate in the first half of the 13th century, who served as Bishop of Győr from around 1219 to 1222.

== Biography ==
Cosmas was born into an ethnic Hungarian medium landowner noble family originated from Somogy County. Prior to his bishopric, he was a canon or provost of the Székesfehérvár Chapter, an important place of authentication in the kingdom. Consequently, he was presumably a royal chaplain during the reign of Andrew II of Hungary. He was made Bishop of Győr around 1219. He was a signatory of the Golden Bull of 1222. Following that he resigned from his office and retired to the Fehérvár Chapter, where he lived for years, according to a letter of Pope Honorius III. The motivation of Cosmas' resignation is unknown. His successor, Gregory was elected bishop in 1224.

== Sources ==
- Bánk, József, ed. (1968). Győregyházmegyei almanach. Schematizmus Dioecesis Jaurinensis [Almanac of the Diocese of Győr] (in Hungarian). Authority of the Diocese of Győr.
- Diós, István (2002). Magyar katolikus lexikon [Hungarian Catholic Lexicon] Vol. VII (in Hungarian). Szent István Kiadó. ISBN 963-3613-32-9.
- Győri, Éva (2008). "Győri püspökök a XIII. században [The Bishops of Győr in the 13th Century]". Belvedere Meridionale (in Hungarian). 20 (1–2): 24–43. ISSN 1419-0222.
- Zsoldos, Attila (2011). Magyarország világi archontológiája, 1000–1301 [Secular Archontology of Hungary, 1000–1301] (in Hungarian). História, MTA Történettudományi Intézete. ISBN 978-963-9627-38-3.

Catholic Church titles
Preceded by Peter	Bishop of Győr; 1219–1222	Succeeded by Gregory
