= Income register of Béla III of Hungary =

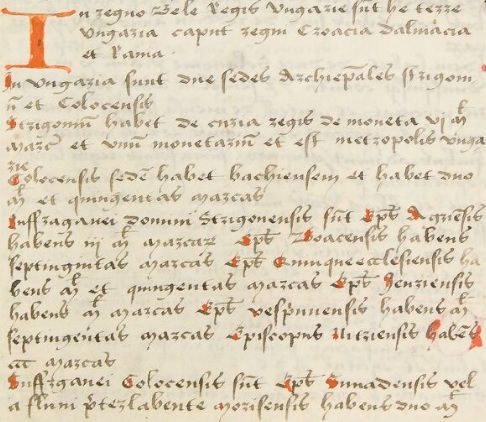
First page of the income register (BNF Fonds latin, Lat. 6238, 20r)

The income register of Béla III of Hungary, compiled around 1185 or 1195, is a unique document of the economic history of Hungary, which lists the crown revenues of the Hungarian king and the incomes of the archbishops and their suffragans in the late 12th century. The data shows that Béla III was one of the wealthiest European monarchs of his time, but the reliability of the figures is questioned and long-disputed.

== The document ==
It is possible that the Latin-language income register was compiled for the English royal court, when Béla III, whose first wife Agnes of Antioch died around 1184, intended to marry Matilda of Saxony, the granddaughter of Henry II of England. Finally, Béla married Henry II's widowed daughter-in-law, Margaret of France, in the summer of 1186. According to historians Gyula Kristó and Boglárka Weisz, it is also possible that the list of Béla's revenues was recorded around 1195 for the Aragonese royal court, when Béla's eldest son and heir Emeric was betrothed to Constance of Aragon. Based on the various surrounding content of the codex, which preserved the text of the income register (see below), historian Dániel Bácsatyai argued that Béla's list of revenues belonged to the collection of 12th-century English cleric and chronicler Ralph de Diceto, who acquired the data via the legation of Richard Barre to Hungary in 1188. The data set can thus be related to the preparations for the Third Crusade and the creation of its financial conditions, in which church institutions also took part.

The income register was copied to a 15–16th-century codex in the Kingdom of England (folio 20). Jean-Baptiste Colbert bought the codex around 1680 and it (under the reference number Latin 6238) subsequently became part of the collection of the Bibliothèque nationale de France. After identifications in auction catalogues, historian Dániel Bácsatyai determined that, in fact, Colbert's namesake son bought the codex in 1687, along with several other pieces from the library of William Cecil, 1st Baron Burghley and his descendants, which was being auctioned in London. The French royal library (predecessor of BnF) acquired the Colberts' library in 1732.

For the Hungarian historiography, the text was discovered and copied by royal chamberlain Count János Waldstein-Wartenberg in 1824. With his permission, legal historians Alajos Mednyánszky and György Bartal published the document, which was also included the collection of charters in the monumental work of archivist György Fejér. The manuscript was discovered and published by several travelers and researchers (for instance, Albert Volstán Berzeviczy and Ferenc Tessedik) independently of each other in the first half of the 19th century, but Fejér's edition, which was laden with numerous errors, became authoritative after Stephan Endlicher published it in his collection of texts Rerum Hungaricarum monumenta Arpadiana in 1849.

== Figures ==
=== Incomes of the prelates ===
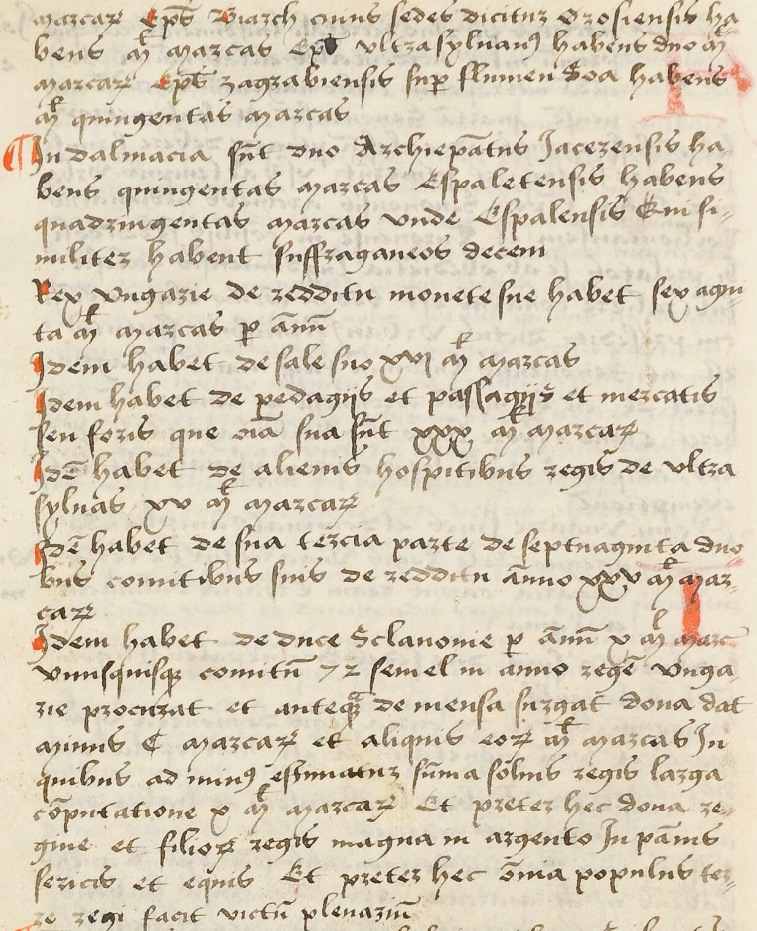
Second page of the income register (BNF Fonds latin, Lat. 6238, 20v)

Incomes of the archbishops and their suffragans
Diocese	Income (Hungarian marks)	Income (pure silver kg)
Archiepiscopal Province of Esztergom
Esztergom	6,000	1120.1
Eger	3,000	560
Vác	700	130.6
Pécs	1,500	280
Győr	1,000	186.7
Veszprém	1,700	317.3
Nyitra	300	56
Archiepiscopal Province of Kalocsa
Kalocsa–Bács	2,500	466.7
Csanád	2,000	373.4
Bihar	1,000	186.7
Transylvania	2,000	373.4
Zagreb	1,500	280
Dalmatian archdioceses
Zadar	500	74.7
Split	400	93.3
Altogether	24,100	4,499
Without Dalmatia	23,200	4,331

According to the earliest opinions (for instance, Ferenc Baumgarten), the above account was made for the purpose of papal tax collection for the Roman Curia. The document lists the revenues of the two archbishops and their suffragans, in addition to mentioning that Esztergom had its own mintage and data also refer to the two Dalmatian archdioceses, which at that time had a total of ten suffragan bishoprics, but their names and income are not detailed in the list.

Historian Bálint Hóman denied the above position regarding the purpose of papal tax collection and argued the summation does not list the entire episcopal income, but only the tithe paid by the royal court after the royal income, so it only includes a specific part of the church income. As evidence, he referred to the law of Coloman, King of Hungary, which ordered that the bishops receive one tenth of the royal customs and fair revenues in the territory of the respected dioceses. Gyula Kristó considered it is possible that one of the purposes of the account was to inform the papal court. He explained this assumption by the relatively low amount of the bishops' income — a maneuver that deliberately reduced their revenues and thus the papal tax amount.

Historians János Barta and Gábor Barta converted the unit of measure (Hungarian mark) to its equivalent: 233.35 g, 80% silver content, i.e. one Hungarian mark contained 186.68 g of pure silver during the reign of Béla III. Using 15th- and 16th-century data sets on bishops' incomes with the same unit of measure (pure silver), they revealed that, by the beginning of the 14th century, revenues of the prelates had fallen drastically, which, however, did not correspond to the development of the Hungarian population (the largest part of the church income was always the tithe). János Barta and Gábor Barta argued the list was intended to summarize the full episcopal incomes. The division of tithes between bishops and their chapters was not yet common at the end of the 12th century in Hungary, thus, this can be explained by the fact that the data series contain substantially fewer amounts in the later centuries, when total revenues are approx. one third has already gone directly to the cathedral and collegiate chapters. According to the research, three-quarters of the 12th century income fell on church income (tithes, cathedraticum, etc.) and one-fourth part on the yield of church estates; expressed in silver value, this is 3248.2 kg and 1082.7 kg, respectively. The two economic historians considered the income register, for political purposes, gave an amount between one third and one quarter higher than the real one, so the total income of the dioceses was approx. 3,200–3,400 kg of pure silver in 1185 (or 1195), which already proportionally fits into the later data series.

=== Revenues of Béla III ===
Revenues of Béla III
Revenues	Income (Hungarian marks)	Income (pure silver kg)
Ordinary and regular income
Royal estates (Note: Two-thirds share from the income of 72 ispáns: 25,000 marks; share from the revenues of the Duke of Slavonia (i.e. Béla's son, Emeric): 10,000 marks; annual gifts from each ispáns: 10,000 marks)	45,000	8,400.766
Tax from the hospes community in Transylvania	15,000	2,800.255
Occasional income
Coinage and the exchange of coins (Note: The so-called chamber's profit (Latin: lucrum camerae))	60,000	11,201.022
Royal monopoly of salt mining and salt trade	16,000	2,986.940
Customs, duties, fairs	30,000	5,600.511
Altogether	166,000	30,989.494

In addition to the sums of money, the text also mentions that Béla III and the royal family received a substantial "gift" in silver, silk cloth, and horses. In addition, the people of the land fully provided for the king's household. Bálint Hóman considered the summation (altogether 166,000 marks) does not include the in-kind benefits mentioned in the last sentences. Hóman, who claimed the incomes of the prelates contains the tithe paid by the royal court after the royal income (see above), argued Béla III had revenues of 241,000 marks (ten times the amount of the bishops' income). According to the list of Béla's revenues, his yearly income amounted 36.1 percent regular royal revenues and 63.9 percent jura regalia. If the list is reliable, which Hóman accepted, his income surpassed the revenues of the contemporaneous Kings of France and England, and only the Holy Roman Emperor and the Byzantine Emperor ahead of him in terms of annual revenues.

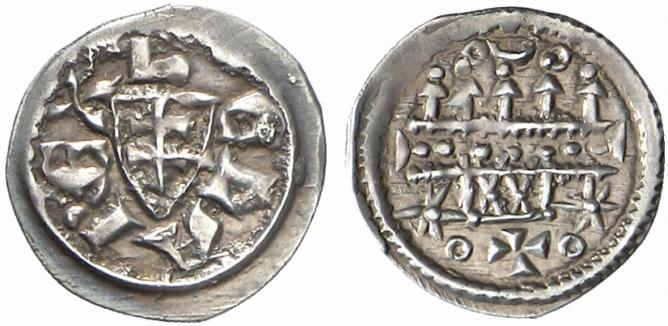
Silver coin of Béla III

János Barta and Gábor Barta argued both the real size and the internal proportion of the king's considerable incomes are more than doubtful. The two historians compared it with the annual incomes of later kings (again using the pure silver as a common unit of measure), and according to this, only Matthias Corvinus approached the amounts found in Béla's income register 300 years later, in the 1480s (with annual 703,000 golden florins, an equivalent to 27,775 kg of pure silver), which casts doubt on the authenticity of the Béla-era figures. They argued the amount of Béla's income from the compulsory annual exchange of coins (11,201 kg of pure silver) assumes a surreal scale in annual production of precious metals (35,000 kg silver yearly), thus the amount is completely uncredited, or the data does not only contain the numbers for the mandatory coin exchange (the so-called "chamber's profit"), but also revenues from coinage, silver mining (in Selmec and Radna) and gold mining. Béla's amount from salt mining and trade point again only to the fact that it was reckoned about 25 percent more to the reality in the age of his reign, after analyzing the increase in the population of Hungary and the parallel increase in the demand for salt and production costs in the upcoming centuries (during the rule of Sigismund then Matthias). Béla's significant income from the royal estates (60,000 marks) shows that at that time the monarch was still the largest landowner in the country, owning more estates than all the nobles combined (two-thirds part of the entire kingdom). He also maintained the taxation of royal estates that fell into private hands. The disintegration of the royal landholding system took place in the 13th century, during the reigns of Andrew II and Béla IV. The high amount of tax from hospes (guest) communities from Transylvania (15,000 marks) reflects that this category did not only include Transylvanian Saxons, but other ethnic groups (e.g. Székelys, Walloons, Pechenegs and Vlachs). Even with this, the overcounting can therefore be at least doubled, or even greater, if the Székelys, for instance, cannot be classified among the "foreign" peoples paying tribute to the king.

The two historians compared the data of Béla's income register with contemporaneous or near-contemporaneous taxation records from England and France. Hungary, a territory of approximately 300,000 km2, resulted a value of 45,000 marks for its monarch. The dominalian incomes of the Duchy of Normandy with a territory of altogether 30,000 km2 may be valued of this time 2808 silver marks. Consequently, the Hungarian datum is not absolutely impossible. János Barta and Gábor Barta argued that, the dis-figuration of the data of the age of Béla III on the whole might be hardly more than 20–25 percent, that is, it can be estimated the real value of the Hungarian royal revenues at the end of the 12th century about 123,175 marks, equivalent to 22,995 kg pure silver. The decline of economic power of the Hungarian monarch in the 13th century resulted that only Matthias Corvinus was able to obtain similar large-scale revenues in Hungary in the second half of the 15th century.

Revenues of Béla III (revised by J. Barta and G. Barta)
Revenues	Income (Hungarian marks)	Income (pure silver kg)	Proportion (%)
Ordinary income	50,000	9,334	40.6
Mining, coinage	42,000	7,841	34.1
Customs	18,375	3,431	14.9
Royal monopoly of salt	12,800	2,389	10.4
Altogether	123,175	22,995	100

Revenues of some Hungarian monarchs (analysis by J. Barta and G. Barta)
Monarch	Year	Income (pure silver kg)
Béla III	c. 1185/1195	22,995
Charles I	c. 1320	14–15,000
Sigismund	c. 1420	13,000
Matthias I	c. 1480	27,775

== Historiography ==
Historian László Szalay was the first scholar, who utilized the income register in his six-part monograph Magyarország története (1852); he was the first to determine that the note was probably written on the occasion of the engagement of Béla and Margaret of France in 1886. Accordingly, since he was unaware of the codex's connection to England, Szalay considered that Béla sent his list of revenues to his prospective brother-in-law Philip II of France. This theory was later adopted by Henrik Marczali. Publishing its facsimile edition, Remig Békefi corrected numerous errors in the critical text and correctly determined the age of the codex containing the manuscript in the book published in memory of Béla (III. Béla magyar király emlékezete) in 1900. Béla Küffer determined the 16th-century origin of the codex, while Ferenc Baumgarten discovered its English provenance; the latter linked its origin to the papal court's interest in the disclosure of bishops' incomes.

20th-century historian Bálint Hóman – who was the first to link the document to Béla's intention to marry Matilda of Saxony – described the income register as "an extremely valuable statistical report, from which we get a clear picture of the financial situation of the medieval Hungarian king, the royal, or rather the state income, and among them the minting income". Marxist historians following the World War II – Erik Molnár, Emma Lederer and Lajos Elekes – refused this standpoint, considering that Hóman (also a far-right politician in the interwar period, who was later sentenced to life imprisonment) attributed so much importance to this source in support of the theory of "great power politics". Lajos Elekes thought falsely that "certain data of income shown in the list show a striking relationship with treasury revenues from the middle of the 15th century". Emma Lederer described the register as completely fabricated and could not be accepted as "an important source material typical of the era of Béla III".

György Györffy cited the document as "the most precious statistical record of the country's relations at the end of the 12th century". Gyula Kristó claimed the register "overestimates the Hungarian king's income", which "is not suitable for drawing reliable conclusions either in terms of items or in relation to the ratio of the individual amounts". Pál Engel argued that the "sum [166,000 marks] is incredibly large [...] and the document did not depict reality, [but] [...] can provide valuable information about the structure of the economy". Economic historian Boglárka Weisz considered "the text of the income register was damaged or incomplete in several places during copying, but the outline of income types can be considered authentic".

Economic historians János Barta and Gábor Barta, who slightly corrected the figures of Béla's income register, considered the document to be "approximately authentic". According to them, the list reflects the extensive royal power in Hungary in the late 12th century. The comparison of the categories of royal income with the English and French records (dominated by direct taxes, which does not exist in Hungary yet) is made impossible by the fact that the Hungarian king had significantly more power and exclusivity over his subjects than the English and French kings socialized in the feudal system. Béla III had a much larger income because mining, land holdings, and the salt trade were in the possession of the royal power, so while the French and English records show the country's income, which amount could have flowed in through several channels, Béla's income list makes it certain that the wealth of the country was equal to the wealth of the ruler. The two historians argued Béla's list of income thus "presented a world that was disappearing subsequently in one or two decades, presenting at the last moment the state in which the monarch, faithfully maintaining the system of the state founder Stephen I of Hungary, could exercise with his rights almost without limits – and with the goods produced by the realm and society".

== Sources ==
- Bácsatyai, Dániel (2025). "III. Béla és főpapjai jövedelemjegyzékének keletkezése és fennmaradása [The Origin and Preservation of the Income Register of Béla III and the Hungarian Prelates]". Történelmi Szemle (in Hungarian). 67 (4). Hungarian Academy of Sciences: 423–442. ISSN 0040-9634.
- Barta, János Jr.; Barta, Gábor (1993). "III. Béla király jövedelmei (Megjegyzések középkori uralkodóink bevételeiről) [Revenues of the King Béla III (Remarks about the Incomes of the Hungarian Kings in the Middle Ages)]". Századok (in Hungarian). 127 (3–4). Magyar Történelmi Társulat: 413–449. ISSN 0039-8098.
- Engel, Pál (2001). The Realm of St Stephen: A History of Medieval Hungary, 895–1526. I.B. Tauris Publishers. ISBN 978-1-86064-061-2.
- Hóman, Bálint (1916). Magyar pénztörténet 1000–1325 [History of the Hungarian Currency 1000–1325] (in Hungarian). Hungarian Academy of Sciences.
- Thoroczkay, Gábor, ed. (2018). Írott források az 1116–1205 közötti magyar történelemről [Written Sources of the Hungarian History between 1116 and 1205] (in Hungarian). Szegedi Középkorász Műhely. ISBN 978-615-80398-3-3.
