= Peter II (bishop of Győr) =

Hungarian bishop

Peter
- Bishop of Győr
- Appointed: 1205
- Term ended: 1218
- Predecessor: Ugrin Csák
- Successor: Cosmas
- Other post: Chancellor

Personal details
- Born: 1170s
- Died: 1218 Damietta (?), Ayyubid Sultanate, Holy Land
- Parents: dux Velek (?); Greek woman (?)

Peter (Hungarian: Péter; died 1218) was a Hungarian prelate at the turn of the 12th and 13th centuries, who served as Bishop of Győr from 1205 to 1218. Prior to that, he was chancellor in the royal court of Emeric, King of Hungary between 1202 and 1204. He participated in the Fifth Crusade, where he was killed in fights against the Ayyubid Sultanate. Some historians identify him with the chronicler Anonymus, author of the Gesta Hungarorum.

== Early life ==
Peter (also Pescha and Pechse) was born in the mid-1170s, as he was about the same age as King Andrew II, according to his royal charter from 1217. They were brought up together in the royal court of Andrew's father, Béla III. The aforementioned name variants confirm his Hungarian origin. The reconstruction of Peter's early life is uncertain and contested, mainly depending on the existing parallel scholarly standpoints that he can be identified with the chronicler Anonymus or not. In 1966, literary journal Irodalomtörténeti Közlemények published the papers of János Horváth, Jr. and Károly Sólyom, who first claimed Anonymus was identical with Peter, Bishop of Győr, independently from each other. Subsequently, other historians, including György Györffy and Gyula Kristó refused their theory and there is no unanimously recognized scientific position. For instance, the interpretation of the "P dictus magister" text in the opening sentence of the Gesta Hungarorum is unclear. The text may refer to a man whose monogram was P – as most of the historians share this view and tried to find contemporary church people with "P" initial – or it may be an abbreviation of the Latin word for "aforementioned" (praedictus) in reference to a name on the title page which is now missing.

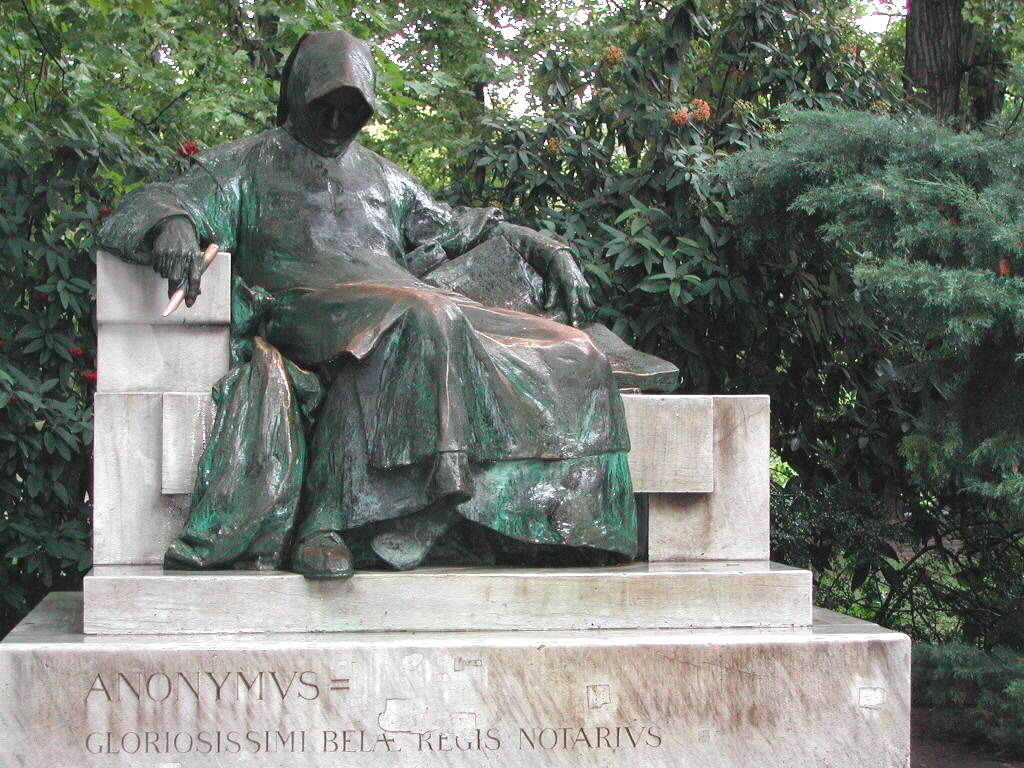
20th-century statue of the anonymous author of the Gesta Hungarorum in Vajdahunyad Castle in Budapest

Philologist János Horváth, who claimed Peter was identical with Anonymus, considered his baptismal name was Peter and identified him with a certain bishop Torda (Turda) – his pagan name, son of dux Velek, who was referred by Andrew II in 1225. In this theory, Peter's mother was a Greek woman, possibly a maid of honor of Béla's first wife Agnes of Antioch and he also had a sister Anne, who married Bors, son of Dominic Miskolc and Margaret, spouse of an unidentified Ban Stephen. Accordingly, Peter came from the lineage of chieftain Velek, who had participated in the Hungarian conquest of the Carpathian Basin and is a recurring character in the Gesta Hungarorum. As Anonymus had a detailed knowledge of the lands along the upper courses of the river Tisza, especially the bishopric lands of the Diocese of Eger, historian Károly Sólyom, who also identified Anonymus with Bishop Peter, claimed that Duke Andrew and Peter spent their youth in the episcopal manor of Peter, Bishop of Eger in the 1180s. During that time, the younger prince Andrew was raised as a potential pretender to the neighboring Principality of Halych. Regardless his identification with Anonymus, Sólyom considered Bishop Peter himself also originated from the borderlands of Zaránd County, based on his other name variants in the contemporary documents. He also claimed the town of Pecica (Pécska), present-day in Romania, is named after him.

Peter attended a French universitas (presumably at the Abbey of Saint Genevieve or the University of Paris) from 1190 to 1194, where obtained a doctorate of canon law. He bore the title of magister, demonstrating his literacy and scientific proficiency. According to Károly Sólyom, Peter studied together with his friend the "literate" Nicholas Csák (brother or nephew of Bishop Ugrin Csák). Accordingly, later Anonymus dedicated his work to "the most venerable man N", i.e. Nicholas. Peter read Dares Phrygius's Trojan History, if the Anonymus identification is correct. Returning to Hungary, Peter functioned as a notary in the chancellery of Béla III between 1194 and 1196, as both János Horváth and Károly Sólyom argued (Anonymus wrote in the opening sentence of his work that he was "Bele regis notarius" – "Notary of King Béla"). According to Sólyom's interpretation, the young Peter wrote the Gesta Hungarorum thereafter, from 1196 to 1198, after the death of Béla III (while the majority of historians consider Anonymus was in advanced age, when the text was completed in the early 13th century), but before his election as provost of Székesfehérvár (as Anonymus styled himself only magister in his work). As Anonymus knew and used the Aragonese chronicles as a source, Sólyom assumed that the young courtly cleric Peter was a member of that Hungarian diplomatic mission, which escorted Constance of Aragon to Hungary in order to become the wife of Emeric, King of Hungary around 1197 or 1198.

Peter already served as provost of Székesfehérvár, when he was made chancellor in the royal court in 1202. This high confidence function showed that, despite his juvenile ties to Andrew, he was a confidant of King Emeric too, whose whole reign was characterized by the struggles for the Hungarian throne with his younger brother. Peter retained his office until the death of Emeric in 1204. It is possible he is identical with that magister Peter, who made a diplomatic visit to Rome in November 1204, according to the letter of Pope Innocent III. If Peter is not identical with Anonymus, only the following data are certain about his early life: he was born in the 1170s and spent his childhood in Duke Andrew's surroundings. Contemporary records preserved other name variants of his name: Pescha, Pechse and Pethse. He served as provost of Székesfehérvár and royal chancellor from 1202 to 1204, before becoming Bishop of Győr until his death.

== Bishop of Győr ==
At the turn of 1204 and 1205, following the translation of Ugrin Csák to the Archdiocese of Esztergom, Peter was elected Bishop of Győr. He was a faithful confidant of Duke Andrew, who administered the kingdom on behalf of his minor nephew, Ladislaus III. According to the Annales Admontenses, when the young Ladislaus died in exile at Vienna in May 1205, the Bishop of Győr – most likely Peter – carried his body, the Holy Crown and the royal insignia to Székesfehérvár. Ladislaus was buried in the Székesfehérvár Basilica. It is plausible that Peter was also present at the coronation of Andrew II on 29 May. In contemporary domestic documents and charters, Peter first appears as suffragan on 1 August 1205, when he was still styled as bishop-elect. During his bishopric, Peter supported the efforts of Andrew II, who introduced a new policy for royal grants, which he called "new institutions" in one of his charters.

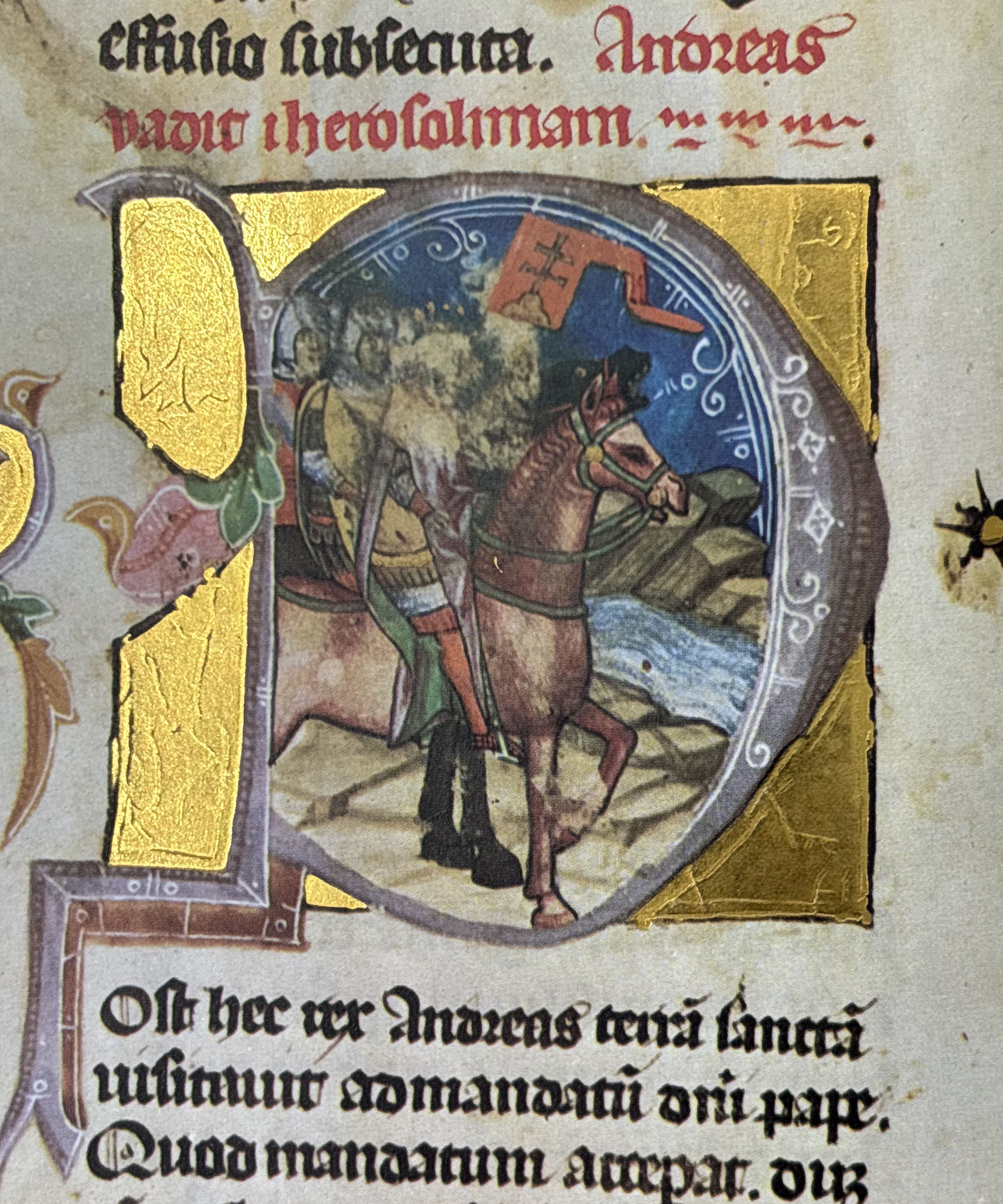
Andrew II at the head of his crusader army (from the Illuminated Chronicle)

In the upcoming decade, Peter involved in various ecclesiastical disputes and lawsuit as a papal trustee and arbitrator due to his high degree of literacy, in addition to his proficiency in canon law. He supported the election of John, Archbishop of Esztergom during a legal controversy with Pope Innocent. When King Andrew made his brother-in-law, Berthold, Pope Innocent refused the confirm his nomination, because he was under the specified age. Archbishop John confronted with the influential Berthold in numerous occasions. Queen Gertrude's brother was tacitly supported by King Andrew II in his efforts. Upon John's request, Pope Innocent confirmed his dignity's right of the coronation of the Hungarian monarch in 1209. However Berthold used his family relationships and influence in the royal court to put John under pressure. Amidst these circumstances, John was inclined to reach agreement in 1211: the two archbishops entrusted Robert, Bishop of Veszprém and Peter, Bishop of Győr to prepare a convention draft and submit to the Roman Curia. The proposal contained that the right of coronation should belong to the role of archbishop Esztergom, except in case of deliberate rejection, obstacle, deteriorated health condition or sede vacante, when the process must be performed by the archbishop of Kalocsa. The so-called "second coronations" (during festive events) must be celebrated jointly. The theses of the document was promoted by Andrew II himself too. However Pope Innocent refused to countersign the document on 12 February 1212, referring to its "harmful consequences" for the Kingdom of Hungary. Upon the request of Andrew II, Peter and Robert escorted the unpopular and endangered Berthold until the Austrian border in 1214, protected by the episcopal armies of Győr and Veszprém. According to János Horváth, Peter wrote his gesta sometimes between 1215 and 1217, and also reflected the assassination of Queen Gertrude occurred in 1213.

Andrew II, who had pledged to lead a crusade to the Holy Land, petitioned Pope Innocent in 1214 to lift bishops Peter and Kalán Bár-Kalán from being obligated to attend the Fourth Council of the Lateran in the next year, because they were planning to participate in the campaign. However Andrew had again postponed the crusade. Instead, Bishop Peter visited Constantinople and negotiated with Henry of Flanders in mid-1215 over the proposed marriage between Andrew II and Yolanda, the daughter of the Emperor's brother-in-law, Peter II of Courtenay. After the conclusion of the agreement, Peter brought the queen to Hungary across the Balkans. Andrew and Yolanda were married still in that year. In July 1216, the newly elected Pope Honorius III once again called upon Andrew to fulfill his father's vow to lead a crusade. Amid the preparations for war, Peter procured Andrew II to confirm all possessions and privileges of his diocese's collegiate chapter of Vasvár. According to a royal charter from 1224, he was also granted the village of Szovát in Győr County (present-day Bágyogszovát). In May 1217, Andrew's army began its journey to the Holy Land with the participation of Thomas, Bishop-elect of Eger and Peter of Győr. In July, they departed from Zagreb and embarked in Split two months later. The ships transported them to Acre, where they landed in October. Andrew and his army participated in the fruitless clashes at the Mount Tabor against the Ayyubids. When Andrew decided to return home at the very beginning of 1218, Thomas and Peter remained in Syria. Peter died there sometime in 1217 or 1218. According to István Erőss, he was killed in the skirmishes at the Anti-Lebanon Mountains. The Cronica Reinhardsbrunnensis narrated that two unnamed Hungarian bishops were perished during the Siege of Damietta. Historian Gyula Pauler identified them with Peter of Győr and Simon of Várad.

== Sources ==
- Bánk, József, ed. (1968). Győregyházmegyei almanach. Schematizmus Dioecesis Jaurinensis [Almanac of the Diocese of Győr] (in Hungarian). Authority of the Diocese of Győr.
- Diós, István (2005). Magyar katolikus lexikon [Hungarian Catholic Lexicon] Vol. X (in Hungarian). Szent István Kiadó. ISBN 963-360-727-2.
- Győri, Éva (2008). "Győri püspökök a XIII. században [The Bishops of Győr in the 13th Century]". Belvedere Meridionale (in Hungarian). 20 (1–2): 24–43. ISSN 1419-0222.
- Horváth, János (1966a). "P. mester és műve (Első közlemény) [Master P. and His Work (First Part)]". Irodalomtörténeti Közlemények (in Hungarian). 70 (1–2): 1–53. ISSN 0021-1486.
- Horváth, János (1966b). "P. mester és műve (Második közlemény) [Master P. and His Work (Second Part)]". Irodalomtörténeti Közlemények (in Hungarian). 70 (3–4): 261–282. ISSN 0021-1486.
- Markó, László (2006). A magyar állam főméltóságai Szent Istvántól napjainkig: Életrajzi Lexikon [Great Officers of State in Hungary from King Saint Stephen to Our Days: A Biographical Encyclopedia] (in Hungarian). Helikon Kiadó. ISBN 963-547-085-1.
- Sólyom, Károly (1966). "Új szempontok az Anonymus-probléma megoldásához [New Considerations for Solving the "Anonymus Problem"]". Irodalomtörténeti Közlemények (in Hungarian). 70 (1–2): 54–84. ISSN 0021-1486.
- Thoroczkay, Gábor (2009). Írások az Árpád-korról: Történeti és historiográfiai tanulmányok [On the Age of the Árpáds: Historical and Historiographic Studies] (in Hungarian). L'Harmattan. ISBN 978-963-236-165-9.
- Zsoldos, Attila (2011). Magyarország világi archontológiája, 1000–1301 [Secular Archontology of Hungary, 1000–1301] (in Hungarian). História, MTA Történettudományi Intézete. ISBN 978-963-9627-38-3.

Political offices
Preceded by Desiderius	Chancellor; 1202–1204	Succeeded by Gottfried
Catholic Church titles
Preceded by Gotthard	Provost of Székesfehérvár; 1202–1204	Succeeded by Robert
Preceded by Ugrin Csák	Bishop of Győr; 1205–1218	Succeeded by Cosmas
