= Robert (archbishop of Esztergom) =

French-born prelate

- Archbishop of Esztergom
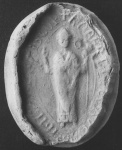
- Seal of Bishop Robert, 1210
- Installed: 13 March 1226
- Term ended: 1 November 1239
- Predecessor: Thomas
- Successor: Matthias Rátót
- Other post: Bishop of Veszprém

Personal details
- Born: 1170s Liège (Lüttich), Holy Roman Empire
- Died: 1 November 1239 Esztergom, Kingdom of Hungary
- Denomination: Roman Catholic
- Education: University of Paris (?)

Robert (Hungarian: Róbert; died 1 November 1239) was a French-born prelate in the Kingdom of Hungary in the first decades of the 13th century. He was Archbishop of Esztergom between 1226 and 1239 and Bishop of Veszprém from 1209 till 1226. He played a decisive role in the establishment of the short-lived Diocese of Cumania. He was sharply opposed to the employment of Jews and Muslims in the administration of the royal revenues. He even put Hungary under interdict to force Andrew II of Hungary to dismiss his non-Christian officials.

== Early career ==
Robert was of French noble origin, who was born in the territory of the Diocese of Liège. It is presumable that he came to Hungary, when became a royal tutor of King Andrew's eldest son Béla (born 1206), replacing Bernard of Perugia, Archbishop of Split. In contemporary records, his name is referred to with the honorary title of "magister", demonstrating his university degree (possibly he studied in Liège or Sorbonne). Some historians consider he is identical with that Robertus Anglicus, who, alongside Peter, provost of Esztergom, stole documents from the papal register of the late Pope Alexander III in order to disarm the jurisdictional claims of the Archdiocese of Kalocsa against Esztergom. Historian Dániel Bácsatyai argues a namesake member of the cathedral chapter of Esztergom, mentioned in 1183, is the same person as Robert.

He simultaneously functioned as chancellor and provost of Székesfehérvár from 1207 to 1209. In this capacity, he was a supporter of the so-called "new institutions", a new policy for royal grants introduced by Andrew. While recording the preliminaries of the royal charters throughout 1208 and 1209, Robert characterized this reform as "the best measure of a royal grant is its being immeasurable." That sentence reflects Robert's knowledge of Novellae Constitutiones (one of the four parts of the Roman law), where the same phrase appears regarding the donations of the churches.

== Bishop of Veszprém ==
After the death of his predecessor Kalanda, Robert was elected as Bishop of Veszprém in 1209. His election was confirmed by Pope Innocent III in the next year. He first appears in this dignity in 1209, when he transcribed the undated letter of Pope Innocent regarding the confirmation of the diocese's right of patronage over the St. John church, which was once donated to the bishopric by lady Raguel. Robert and his fellow bishop Peter of Győr were entrusted in 1211 to prepare a convention draft and submit to the Roman Curia on the subject of conflicts of jurisdiction between the archdioceses of Esztergom and Kalocsa. The proposal contained that the right of coronation should belong to the role of archbishop Esztergom, except in case of deliberate rejection, obstacle, deteriorated health condition or sede vacante, when the process must be performed by the archbishop of Kalocsa. The so-called "second coronations" (during festive events) must be celebrated jointly. In addition, the document attached the collection of tithe after the coinage to Esztergom, but John of Esztergom had to waive his all right (i.e. superintendence over the royal churches, abbeys and provostries, ecclesiastical jurisdiction over the royal officials) in the territory of the church province of Kalocsa, in accordance with the proposal. The theses of the document was promoted by Andrew II himself too. However Pope Innocent refused to countersign the document on 12 February 1212, referring to its "harmful consequences" for the Kingdom of Hungary.

Robert had a tense relationship with his metropolitan archbishop John, since Robert was the main preparer and submitter to the draft which sought to reduce the privileges of Esztergom. They had conflicts in the subject of superintendence over the provostry of Óbuda and the jurisdiction over the clerical staff in the royal court (mostly resided in Óbuda), in addition to the right of coronation of the queen consorts. The debate was intensified during the marriage of Andrew II and his second spouse Yolanda de Courtenay in February 1215. Their wedding was celebrated in Székesfehérvár and John crowned Yolanda queen consort. In response, Robert sent a complaint to Pope Innocent III, because the coronation of the queens consort in Hungary had been traditionally the privilege of his see, according to his narration. After Robert's personal visit in Rome, the pope sent two legates, cardinals Pelagio Galvani and Stefano di Ceccano to Hungary in order to investigate the complaint and confirmed the privilege of the See of Veszprém in April 1216. The decision was confirmed by Pope Honorius III in 1220 too. When John was prohibited from the free use of the archdiocese's income by the pope for his involvement in the consecration of the allegedly juvenile Bartholomew le Gros, Bishop of Pécs, John had to ask for permission to cover the necessary expenses from the pope's two appointed trustees, Thomas of Eger and his old antipode Robert of Veszprém. The two bishops were entrusted to become the guardians of Bartholomew until he reached adulthood. However an official inquiry ordered by the Holy See ascertained that the new bishop had already attained 30 years, the age required by canon law. After that John was acquitted of the charges and regained the right to financial supervision, while Thomas and Robert's mandate ceased by January 1221.

Following the assassination of Gertrude of Merania, upon the request of Andrew II, bishops Peter of Győr and Robert of Veszprém escorted the unpopular and endangered Archbishop Berthold of Kalocsa until the Austrian border in late 1213, protected by the episcopal armies of Győr and Veszprém. Robert participated in the Fourth Council of the Lateran in 1215, along with the two archbishops, and additionally five Hungarian and three Dalmatian bishops. Following that Robert became the most influential proponent of the Hungarian participation in the Fifth Crusade. In February 1217, Pope Honorius authorized him to absolve those noblemen from their vow, who were entrusted with protection of the realm, while Andrew II prepared for the crusade. Robert even allowed Andrew to mortgage the gold crown of the first queen consort Gisela.

Robert supported the foundation of monasteries in the territory of his diocese. For instance, he returned the collection right of tithe to the nuns of Veszprém Valley over their respective landholdings in 1210, upon the request of abbess Stella. During his episcopate, the abbeys of Almád and Hahót were (re-)established, while the hermits of St. James commenced their activities (they elevated into the formation of the Order of Saint Paul the First Hermit decades later). Robert donated annually 100 silver denari to the chapter of Veszprém. In November 1221, he requested the pope's consent for this. He also donated the chapel of Bereg to the canons for the spiritual sake of the murdered Queen Gertrude of Merania on the first anniversary of her burial. In the autumn of 1216, Robert requested Pope Honorius to confirm the royal donation of Szigetmonostor to the friars of the Teutonic Order's Virgin Mary hospital. Upon Pope Honorius' order, Knight Hospitaller Göncöl was ordained priest then consecrated Archbishop of Split by Robert in 1221. Later he was criticized for this step by the local chapter. Robert had several disputes over the collection right of tithes in Somogy County with the Pannonhalma Abbey and its abbot Uros at least since 1211. The Holy See ruled in favour of Uros in 1215; The tithes with the obligation to repair the churches remained in the hand of the monastery, which was obliged to pay 10 silver marks annually to the diocese. Despite the verdict, Robert tried to take advantage of the abbot's absentee, who participated in the Fifth Crusade, and forced the concerned churches to pay tithes to the Diocese of Veszprém in 1217–1218. Pope Honorius launched a new lawsuit, which lasted a long time, but was ruled in favor of Pannonhalma again.

In the summer of 1223, he was among those prelates who informed the pope that Andrew II planned to arrange a new marriage for his eldest son, Béla. In 1225, Pope Honorius urged Andrew and Queen Yolanda to prohibit Muslims from employing Christians. Historian Nora Berend considers Robert, still as Bishop of Veszprém, was behind the charges, anticipating his future leading role on the issue. His appointment as archbishop in the next year showed his influence at the Roman Curia through his regular correspondence with the pope. One of his last decisions as bishop was when, in the early months of 1226, he attached the chapels of the diocese to its revenues. According to his decision, the half of the tithe income and oblations of the chapels is received by the chapel priests, and the other half by the chapter of Veszprém. His decree also defined the various types of income for the canons.

== Archbishop of Esztergom ==
=== Appointment by the Holy See ===
Thomas of Esztergom died around November 1224, after less than a year of episcopate. The chapter could not agree unanimously about the new archbishop. Two rival factions emerged in the following months: a part of the canons nominated Desiderius of Csanád, while other members of the college supported James of Nyitra (or Nitra). Pope Honorius refused to recognize both elections. He referred to contradicted canonical rules of procedure, and thus called for holding new elections unless he appointed an archbishop to administer the province. In the second round, some canons continued to support Desiderius, while another emerging faction nominated archdeacon Thomas. Honorius again annulled the results and ordered four canons as envoys to Rome to represent their chapter by 6 January 1226. Three of them were guardian Nicholas and canons Andrew and John. However, there they failed to agree on a candidate acceptable to everyone, thus on 13 March 1226 Honorius appointed Robert, who was "worthy of both body and soul" as Archbishop of Esztergom.

=== Persecution of non-Christians ===
Robert pledged to participate in Emperor Frederick II's crusade in 1227. But, instead, he had to postpone his intention of travel to the Holy Land; the nearly contemporaneous Alberic of Trois-Fontaines recorded that a Cuman chieftain's son visited Robert in 1227, asking the archbishop to baptize him together with his 12 retainers. The Cuman nobleman also announced that his father was willing to come to Transylvania to be baptized along with his 2,000 subjects. Archbishop Robert accepted the offer and went to Transylvania, together with three Hungarian prelates, Bartholomew of Pécs, Bartholomew of Veszprém and Raynald of Belleville, Bishop of Transylvania. They met the Cuman chieftain, who was one "Boricius, fourth in rank among the major Cuman leaders", according to the chronicle of the Frisian Emo. At the meeting, the Hungarian prelates baptized Boricius and his retainers in the presence of Duke Béla.

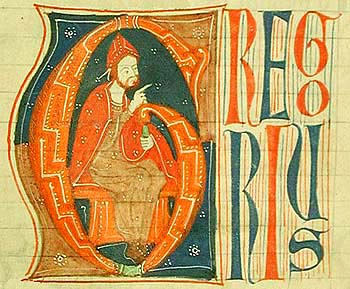
Pope Gregory IX, who confirmed the establishment of the Diocese of Cumania

Pope Gregory IX expressed his joy over the missionaries' success in "Cumania" and in the neighboring "land of the Brodnici" in a letter to Robert on 31 July 1227. Upon his request, the pope officially appointed Robert as papal legate (legatus a latere) to Cumania (i.e. the southwest of Moldavia). With the consent of the Roman Curia, Robert was mandated to baptize local Cumans and raise churches (also ordain priests for those). The conversion of thousands of Cumans was followed by the creation of the Diocese of Cumania. According to Alberic of Trois-Fontaines, Archbishop Robert consecrated Dominican friar Theodoric as bishop of the new diocese in 1228. Pope Gregory confirmed the consecration and urged the head of the Hungarian Dominicans to send new missionaries to the Cumans, and praised Duke Béla who had decided to visit Cumania in the company of Archbishop Robert. In Cumania, Robert carried out his mandate of papal legate in the interest of the Holy See (as he contributed to the political, territorial and spiritual expansion of the Christian faith), neglecting the Hungarian monarch's need for take an active role. The Hungarian royal court were limited to grant military support to Robert. The Christianization of the Cumans was an important political gain for Pope Gregory. Initially the Diocese of Cumania was subordinated to the archbishopric of Esztergom, but on 13 September 1229 the pope exempted the Diocese of Cumania of the authority of the Archbishops of Esztergom, subjecting its bishop directly to the Holy See, as the relationship between the Cumans and their priests was often tense during Robert's supervision. Four years after his first mission, Robert was again mandated to Cumania with the same goal in 1231. However, the result of his second mandate is unknown. Because of his appointment, Pope Gregory absolved Robert from his oath to participate in a crusade in February 1231. The pope informed Robert on the situation of the Latin Empire in his letter in May 1231 and requested him to reach out to Andrew II to provide assistance to the crusader state as he had previously promised.

The employment of Jews and Muslims to administer the royal revenues led Robert and the other subordinated prelates into conflict with King Andrew II. According to Pope Gregory's letter ("the news reached us from the report made by you"), Robert made a complaint about Andrew to the Roman Curia, because the king continued to employ Jews and Muslims despite his former conflict with the Holy See over the issue. Robert intended to extend his legate jurisdiction over Hungary and domestic political affairs. On 3 March 1231, Gregory authorized the archbishop (legate natus) to perform acts of religious censure to persuade Andrew to dismiss his non-Christian officials. Robert could therefore excommunicate anyone who proceeded against the hierocratic (pro-papal) policy. The primatial privilege of the Archbishop of Esztergom was also reaffirmed by the pope, entitling his right to celebrate the coronation of the Hungarian monarch. Under duress, Andrew issued a Golden Bull in 1231, which confirmed that Muslims were banned from employment, and empowered the Archbishop of Esztergom to excommunicate the king if he failed to honor the provisions of the new Golden Bull. The document emphasizes specifically coinage among the public offices forbidden to non-Christians (Jews and Muslims), as the royal mint was located in Esztergom and was part of the privileges of its archbishop.

Although Andrew pledged to respect the privileges of the clergymen and to dismiss his non-Christian officials in his Golden Bull, he never fulfilled the latter promise. Robert excommunicated Palatine Denis, son of Ampud and other royal advisors (e.g. Master of the treasury Nicholas and a certain chamberlain Samuel of "Saracen" origin) and put Hungary under an interdict on 25 February 1232, because the employment of Jews and Muslims continued despite the Golden Bull of 1231. He was the first prelate who used this ecclesiastical censure against the kingdom. Robert argued he carried all this with reference to the apostolic authority (legatus) conferred on him. Since the archbishop accused the Muslims of persuading Andrew to seize church property, Andrew restored properties to the archbishop. Berend says Robert bemoaned the situation of the Catholic Church in the realm, as several clergymen lost their offices due to the presence of non-Christian financial experts. In response, Pope Gregory sent a letter to Archbishop Robert in July 1232, in which he accused him of exceeding his powers. The pope emphasized that Robert's jurisdiction as papal legate was limited only to the area inhabited by the Cumans and ordered him not to apply further ecclesiastical punishments. Pope Gregory sought an agreement and persuaded Robert to suspend the interdict.

Upon Andrew's demand, the pope sent Cardinal Giacomo di Pecorari as his legate to Hungary and promised that nobody would be excommunicated without the pope's special authorization. Thus Robert was overshadowed in the conflict by that time. On 20 August 1233, in the forests of Bereg, Andrew II vowed in the presence of Giacomo di Pecorari and Bartholomew of Veszprém that he would not employ Jews and Muslims to administrate royal revenues, and would pay 10,000 marks as compensation for usurped Church revenues. Andrew repeated his oath in Esztergom in September before Robert, who absolved the king "from his sins". Robert and the bishops also swore oath to the agreement of Bereg in January 1234. For the remaining time, their relationship improved; when the elderly Andrew, who had been widowed, married the 23-year-old Beatrice D'Este on 14 May 1234, Robert crowned the new queen (as archbishop, despite his former protests as Bishop of Veszprém against John of Esztergom), even though the king's sons – his protege Béla and Coloman – were sharply opposed to the marriage. John, Bishop of Bosnia, put Hungary under a new interdict in the first half of 1234, because Andrew had not dismissed his non-Christian officials despite his oath of Bereg. Andrew and, this time, Archbishop Robert protested against the bishop's act at the Holy See.

=== Ecclesiastical affairs and last years ===
In 1231 Robert initiated the process of canonization for one of his 12th-century predecessors, Archbishop Lucas. Upon his request, Pope Gregory entrusted Bulcsú Lád, Bishop of Csanád to conduct an investigation and send his report to Rome. When papal legate Giacomo di Pecorari arrived to Hungary in 1233, he also dealt with the issue, but the protocol was lost and the canonization process postponed. The initiative failed in silence due to the Mongol invasion of 1241.

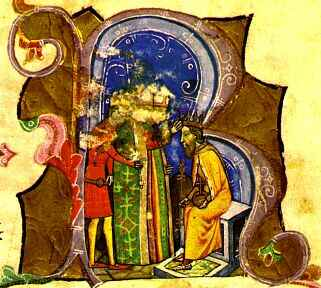
Béla is crowned king (from the Illuminated Chronicle) by Robert in 1235. The archbishop's portrayal is blurred.

The archbishop judged over the collection of tithe from the Szentes church (today Svätuše, Slovakia) in 1228. Following a grant of privilege by Andrew II in 1232, Robert had the right to judge over subjects who lived in the territory of the Archdiocese of Esztergom. However royal churches did not recognize his jurisdiction; for instance, Pope Gregory excommunicated Albert, provost of Arad in 1235, because he refused to acknowledge the authority of the archbishop. Albert only yielded to Archbishop Stephen Báncsa in 1246, promising that he would attend at the synods convoked by the archbishop. The abbey of Garamszentbenedek (today Hronský Beňadik, Slovakia) was also protested against the archdiocese's suzerainty; as a result Robert seized one of their villages.

Andrew II died on 21 September 1235. His son Béla IV was crowned king by Robert on 14 October 1235 in Székesfehérvár. On 29 August 1236, Robert issued two charters; first, he approved that Béla donated the St. Gerard church of Kispest together with its accessories, the St. Andrew chapel of Sasad (today a borough in Újbuda) and the St. Martin chapel of Budaörs to the Cistercian monastery founded by him in Bélakút (i.e., Pétervárad, present-day Petrovaradin, Serbia), which belonged to the church province of Kalocsa. In his second charter, Robert made it clear that the priest of the St. Gerard church had to be confirmed by the chapter of Esztergom with prior approval. Historian Géza Érszegi considers both documents as forgery, as a royal charter issued in 1243 confirms Béla granted the church to the Bélakút Abbey in that year. Béla founded the monastery itself in 1237, a year after Robert's two alleged documents.

On 29 September 1239, a month before Robert's death, Béla gave permission to the archdiocese to build Víziváros (Latin: Civitas Archiepiscopalis, a neighborhood of Esztergom), under the royal castle and the St. Adalbert Basilica. Construction of the borough began during the brief episcopate of Robert's successor Matthias Rátót. Béla called Esztergom "locus primatis" in his royal charter. On 18 October 1239, Robert baptized the new-born prince Stephen, heir apparent and oldest son of Béla IV. Robert died on 1 November 1239. Ascetic devices and cilices were found in his sacristy after his death.

== Sources ==
- Ádám, Iván (1918). "Róbert veszprémi püspök [Bishop Robert of Veszprém]". Katolikus Szemle (in Hungarian). 32 (7): 614–629. ISSN 0022-9431.
- Bácsatyai, Dániel (2017). "II. András angliai követei [King Andrew II's Envoys in England]". Történelmi Szemle (in Hungarian). 59 (4). Hungarian Academy of Sciences: 621–632. ISSN 0040-9634.
- Barabás, Gábor (2015). A pápaság és Magyarország a 13. század első felében. Pápai hatás – együttműködés – érdekellentét [The Papacy and Hungary in the First Half of the 13th Century. Papal influence – cooperation – clash of interests] (in Hungarian). Pécsi Történettudományért Kulturális Egyesület. ISBN 978 963 89482 5 0.
- Beke, Margit (2003). "Róbert [Robert]". In Beke, Margit (ed.). Esztergomi érsekek 1001–2003 [Archbishops of Esztergom 1001–2003] (in Hungarian). Szent István Társulat. pp. 98–103. ISBN 963-361-472-4.
- Berend, Nora (2006). At the Gate of Christendom: Jews, Muslims and "Pagans" in Medieval Hungary, c. 1000-c.1300. Cambridge University Press. ISBN 978-0-521-02720-5.
- Engel, Pál (2001). The Realm of St Stephen: A History of Medieval Hungary, 895–1526. I.B. Tauris Publishers. ISBN 1-86064-061-3.
- Érszegi, Géza (1995). "Róbert érsek oklevelei [Documents of Archbishop Robert]". Magyar Egyháztörténeti Vázlatok (in Hungarian). 7 (1–2): 31–53. ISSN 0865-5227.
- Markó, László (2006). A magyar állam főméltóságai Szent Istvántól napjainkig: Életrajzi Lexikon [Great Officers of State in Hungary from King Saint Stephen to Our Days: A Biographical Encyclopedia] (in Hungarian). Helikon Kiadó. ISBN 963-208-970-7.
- Mihalache, Robert-Marius (2014). "Hierocratic Aspects Related to the Legation of Archbishop Robert of Esztergom to Cumania". Transylvanian Review. 23 (1). Romanian Academy: 118–131. ISSN 1221-1249.
- Solymosi, László (1994). "Az Árpád-kori veszprémi püspökök tevékenysége okleveleink tükrében [Activity of the Bishops of Veszprém from the Age of Árpáds on the Basis of Their Charters]". In V. Fodor, Zsuzsa (ed.). Veszprém kora középkori emlékei (Veszprémi Múzeumi Konferenciák 5.) (in Hungarian). Laczkó Dezső Múzeum, Veszprém. pp. 49–62. ISBN 963-7208-42-9.
- Solymosi, László (2021). Az Árpád-kori veszprémi püspökök oklevelei [The Charters of the Bishops of Veszprém of the Árpádian Age] (in Hungarian). Martin Opitz Kiadó. ISBN 978-963-9987-89-0.
- Spinei, Victor (2008). "The Cuman bishopric—Genesis and evolution". In Curta, Florin; Kovalev, Roman (eds.). The Other Europe in the Middle Ages: Avars, Bulgars, Khazars, and Cumans. Brill. pp. 413–456. ISBN 978-90-04-16389-8.
- Zsoldos, Attila (2011). Magyarország világi archontológiája, 1000–1301 [Secular Archontology of Hungary, 1000–1301] (in Hungarian). História, MTA Történettudományi Intézete. ISBN 978-963-9627-38-3.

Political offices
Preceded by Gottfried	Chancellor; 1207–1209	Succeeded by Thomas
Catholic Church titles
Preceded by Peter	Provost of Székesfehérvár; 1207–1209	Succeeded by James
Preceded by Kalanda	Bishop of Veszprém; 1209–1226	Succeeded by Bartholomew
Preceded by Thomas	Archbishop of Esztergom; 1226–1239	Succeeded by Matthias Rátót
