= Gregory (bishop of Győr) =

Hungarian bishop

- Bishop of Győr
- Appointed: 1224
- Term ended: 1241
- Predecessor: Cosmas
- Successor: Benedict Osl

Personal details
- Died: 11 April 1241 Battle of Mohi

Gregory (Hungarian: Gergely; died 11 April 1241) was a Hungarian prelate in the first half of the 13th century, who served as Bishop of Győr from 1224 until his death fighting against the Mongols in the Battle of Mohi.

== Biography ==
His origin is uncertain, possibly came from a medium landowner family. He bore the title of "magister", demonstrating his potential education and skills in science. Gregory was elected Bishop of Győr by the cathedral chapter in 1224; according to a non-authentic charter, he already held the position since 1223. Nevertheless, he was still referred to as elected bishop in 1224.

Gregory was considered a supporter of Andrew II of Hungary, then Béla IV of Hungary. He actively participated in their governance at the royal council. He led a royal campaign against the Teutonic Knights in 1225, who had attempted to eliminate the suzerainty of the Hungarian kings in their granted territory Barcaság (now Țara Bârsei, Romania) in Transylvania. During his episcopate, Gregory managed to resettle the Franciscan and Dominican friars in the Diocese of Győr. He successfully petitioned Pope Gregory IX in order to recover the previously usurped church benefice by Andrew II. During the Mongol invasion of Hungary, Gregory participated in the Battle of Mohi on 11 April 1241, where he was killed, according to Master Roger's Carmen Miserabile, where his name was misspelled "George".

== Sources ==
- Bánk, József, ed. (1968). Győregyházmegyei almanach. Schematizmus Dioecesis Jaurinensis [Almanac of the Diocese of Győr] (in Hungarian). Authority of the Diocese of Győr.
- Diós, István (1998). Magyar katolikus lexikon [Hungarian Catholic Lexicon] Vol. IV (in Hungarian). Szent István Kiadó. ISBN 963-3610-17-6.
- Győri, Éva (2008). "Győri püspökök a XIII. században [The Bishops of Győr in the 13th Century]". Belvedere Meridionale (in Hungarian). 20 (1–2): 24–43. ISSN 1419-0222.
- Zsoldos, Attila (2011). Magyarország világi archontológiája, 1000–1301 [Secular Archontology of Hungary, 1000–1301] (in Hungarian). História, MTA Történettudományi Intézete. ISBN 978-963-9627-38-3.

Catholic Church titles
Preceded by Cosmas	Bishop of Győr; 1224–1241	Succeeded by Benedict Osl
