= Thomas I (archbishop of Esztergom) =

Hungarian prelate

Thomas
- Archbishop of Esztergom
- See: Esztergom
- Appointed: 1224
- Term ended: 1224
- Predecessor: Sede vacante, before John
- Successor: Sede vacante, after Robert
- Other post: Bishop of Eger

Personal details
- Died: November 1224

Thomas (Hungarian: Tamás; died November 1224) was a Hungarian prelate in the first half of the 13th century, who served as Bishop of Eger from 1217 to 1224, then briefly Archbishop of Esztergom in 1224. He participated in the Fifth Crusade.

== Ecclesiastical career ==
Possibly he was born into a wealthy magnate family, as he was mentioned with the honorary title of "magister", demonstrating his university degree (presumably in abroad). His name first appears in contemporary document, when he is referred to as vice-chancellor (the first known holder of that office) in the royal court of King Andrew II of Hungary in 1209. Already in that year, Thomas was promoted to the position of chancellor, serving in that capacity until 1217. He was styled as "Chancellor of Hungary" in 1212. Beside that court office, Thomas also functioned as provost of Veszprém from 1210 to 1212, provost of Szeben (today Sibiu, Romania) in 1212, and finally provost of Fehérvár from 1212 to 1217. He held the latter function, when Andrew II commissioned him and Mojs, former ispán of Vas County, to investigate the rightful ownership of Szentgotthárd Abbey over the land Dobra (or Vasdobra; today Neuhaus am Klausenbach, Austria) in 1213, which was confirmed by the king after certainty. Thomas led a diplomatic mission to Bulgaria in 1214 to bring an unnamed daughter of Tzar Boril of Bulgaria to Hungary, who was supposed to be the wife of Andrew's son and heir Béla, but later their engagement was broken for unknown reasons. According to a letter of Andrew II to Pope Innocent III in 1214, Thomas was one of those clerics of the realm, who swore to participate in a crusade.

== Prelate ==
After the death of Katapán (or Catepan) in 1217, Thomas was elected Bishop of Eger, holding the dignity for the next seven years. In the same time, he was replaced as chancellor by Ugrin Csák. Thomas appears as Bishop-elect in several royal documents throughout 1217 (first in May). His election was confirmed by Pope Honorius III in the next year. Previously, Honorius called upon Andrew to fulfill his father's vow to lead a crusade. In May 1217, Andrew's army began its journey to the Holy Land with the participation of Thomas, Bishop-elect of Eger and Peter, Bishop of Győr, who also fulfilled their vows (Chancellor Thomas was already exempted from the compulsory participation in the Fourth Council of the Lateran in 1215 because of that). In July, they departed from Zagreb and embarked in Split two months later. The ships transported them to Acre, where they landed in October. Upon the request of Thomas and other bishops, Andrew donated 500 silver denari to the crusaders from the salt income of Szalacs (today Sălacea, Romania) at Easter. When Andrew decided to return home at the very beginning of 1218, Thomas and Peter remained in Syria. Peter was killed in a skirmish against the Ayyubid Sultanate, while Thomas, who was present at the Siege of Damietta, left the region in September 1219 and arrived home in the first half of 1220.

In August 1220, Pope Honorius entrusted Thomas and Robert, Bishop of Veszprém to become the guardians of Bartholomew le Gros, newly elected Bishop of Pécs, until reach adulthood. Prior that, the canons of the cathedral chapter of Pécs attempted to prevent Bartholomew's installation by stating that he was too young for this position, but an official inquiry ordered by the Holy See ascertained that the new bishop had already attained 30 years, the age required by canon law. Thus Thomas and Robert's mandate has ceased by January 1221. Following that Honorius commissioned Thomas and two abbots in January 1222 to investigate the case of the provost of Arad, who was allegedly unlawfully deprived of his property by Andrew II. When the king persuaded his son Béla to separate from his wife, Maria Laskarina, Honorius asked his three loyal prelates, including Thomas to inform him about the situation in May 1222. In the clause of the Golden Bull of 1222, Thomas appears in the third place among the prelates, just after John, Archbishop of Esztergom and Ugrin Csák, Archbishop of Kalocsa. Two of Thomas' trials were preserved by the Regestrum Varadinense. For instance, alongside Solomon Atyusz, Ban of Slavonia, he judged over ispán Demetrius, who was charged by the serfs of Borsod Castle in 1222. Pope Honorius instructed Thomas in January 1223 to appoint a suitable archdeacon or deacon over the clerics of Burzenland, who is introduced to him by the Teutonic Knights.

Following the death of John around November 1223 and a few months of sede vacante, Thomas was elected Archbishop of Esztergom, possibly in early 1224. The town of Esztergom suffered heavy damage in the fire of 1223, thus his most important task was to restore buildings and order. He is first referred to as archbishop by Pope Honorius on 3 February. Three weeks later, the pope entrusted Thomas and suffragan bishops to maintain peace between Andrew II and his son Duke Béla. In May 1224, he was commissioned to protect the papal interests in Barcaság (now Țara Bârsei, Romania). The region earlier was granted to the Teutonic Knights, who donated Borza (today Bârza, Romania) to the Holy See, which act was neglected by Andrew and Raynald of Belleville, Bishop of Transylvania. Thomas always supported Rome in the various canonical disputes. Honorius instructed him to appoint an archdeacon in Borza to represent the Holy See. On 4 December 1224, Pope Honorius sent a letter to Archbishop Thomas, but he suddenly died by then, possibly in November.

== Sources ==
- Beke, Margit (2003). "I. Tamás [Thomas I]". In Beke, Margit (ed.). Esztergomi érsekek 1001–2003 [Archbishops of Esztergom 1001–2003] (in Hungarian). Szent István Társulat. pp. 96–98. ISBN 963-361-472-4.
- Markó, László (2006). A magyar állam főméltóságai Szent Istvántól napjainkig: Életrajzi Lexikon [Great Officers of State in Hungary from King Saint Stephen to Our Days: A Biographical Encyclopedia] (in Hungarian). Helikon Kiadó. ISBN 963-208-970-7.
- Sugár, István (1984). Az egri püspökök története [The History of the Bishops of Eger] (in Hungarian). Szent István Társulat. ISBN 963-360-392-7.
- Zsoldos, Attila (2011). Magyarország világi archontológiája, 1000–1301 [Secular Archontology of Hungary, 1000–1301] (in Hungarian). História, MTA Történettudományi Intézete. ISBN 978-963-9627-38-3.
- Zsoldos, Attila (2022). Az Aranybulla királya [The King of the Golden Bull] (in Hungarian). Városi Levéltár és Kutatóintézet. ISBN 978-963-8406-26-2.

Political offices
Preceded by first known	Vice-chancellor; 1209	Succeeded by Koptipanus (?)
Preceded by Robert	Chancellor; 1209–1217	Succeeded by Ugrin Csák
Catholic Church titles
Preceded by James	Provost of Székesfehérvár; 1212–1217	Succeeded by Conrad
Preceded by Katapán	Bishop of Eger; 1217–1224	Succeeded by Cletus Bél
Vacant Title last held by John	Archbishop of Esztergom; 1224	Vacant Title next held by Robert
