= Coinage in the Kingdom of Hungary =

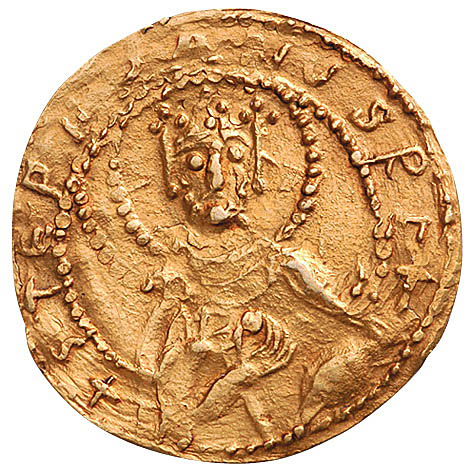
Stephen's gold coin

The coinage in the Kingdom of Hungary (the minting and use of coins) started during the reign of Stephen I who was crowned the first king of Hungary in 1000 or 1001.

The minting of coins was from the beginning a royal prerogative in the Kingdom of Hungary. The first Hungarian coins were struck during the reign of Stephen I who was crowned the first king of Hungary in 1000 or 1001. His coins were minted after Bavarian patterns.

== Sources ==
- Berend, Nora; Urbańczyk, Przemysław; Wiszewski, Przemysław (2013). Central Europe in the High Middle Ages: Bohemia, Hungary and Poland, c. 900-c. 1300. Cambridge University Press. ISBN 978-0-521-78156-5.
- Engel, Pál (2001). The Realm of St Stephen: A History of Medieval Hungary, 895–1526. I.B. Tauris Publishers. ISBN 1-86064-061-3.
- Gedai, István (1994). "pénzverés [Coinage]". In Kristó, Gyula; Engel, Pál; Makk, Ferenc (eds.). Korai magyar történeti lexikon (9–14. század) [Encyclopedia of the Early Hungarian History (9th–14th centuries)] (in Hungarian). Akadémiai Kiadó. pp. 541–542. ISBN 963-05-6722-9.
- Gyöngyössy, Márton (2018). "Coinage and financial administration in late medieval Hungary (1387–1526)". In József Laszlovszky; Nagy Balázs; Péter Szabó; András Vadas (eds.). The Economy of Medieval Hungary. Leiden: Brill. pp. 295–306.
- Tóth, Csaba (2018). "Minting, financial administration and coin circulation in Hungary in the Árpádian and Angevin periods (1000–1387)". In József Laszlovszky; Nagy Balázs; Péter Szabó; András Vadas (eds.). The Economy of Medieval Hungary. Leiden: Brill. pp. 279–94.
