= Transylvanian peasant revolt =

1437–38 revolt in Kingdom of Hungary

- Part of popular revolts in late medieval Europe
Date	June 1437 – January 1438
Location	North Transylvania and Tiszántúl (Transtisza), Kingdom of Hungary
Result	Patrician victory

Belligerents
Transylvanian peasants and petty nobles	Transylvanian aristocracy

Commanders and leaders
Antal Nagy de Buda †; Pál Nagy de Vajdaháza; Mihai the Vlach	Ladislaus Csáki; George Lépes; Michael Jakcs; Henry Tamási; Desiderius Losonci

Strength
Unknown	Unknown

The Transylvanian peasant revolt (Hungarian: erdélyi parasztfelkelés), also known as the Bábolna revolt (Romanian: Răscoala de la Bobâlna) was a popular revolt in the eastern territories of the Kingdom of Hungary in 1437. The revolt broke out after George Lépes, bishop of Transylvania, had failed to collect the tithe for years because of a temporary debasement of the coinage, but then demanded the arrears in one sum when coins of higher value were again issued. Most commoners were unable to pay the demanded sum, but the bishop did not renounce his claim and applied interdict and other ecclesiastic penalties to enforce the payment.

The Transylvanian peasants had already been outraged because of the increase of existing seigneurial duties and taxes and the introduction of new taxes during the first decades of the century. The bishop also tried to collect the tithe from the petty noblemen and from Orthodox Vlachs who had settled in parcels abandoned by Catholic peasants. In the spring of 1437, Hungarian and Vlach commoners, poor townspeople from Kolozsvár (now Cluj-Napoca in Romania) (Note: The article always mentions the Romanian official name of the settlements in parentheses, because Transylvania and eastern Transtisza are now part of Romania.) and petty noblemen started to assemble on the flat summit of Mount Bábolna (Bobâlna) near Alparét where they set up a fortified camp. The bishop and his brother, Roland Lépes, the deputy of the voivode (or royal governor) of Transylvania, gathered their troops to fight against the rebels. The voivode, the two counts of the Székelys and many Transylvanian noblemen also hurried to the mountain to assist them against the rebels.

The rebels sent envoys to the voivode to inform him about their grievances, but the envoys were captured and executed. The voivode invaded the rebels' camp, but the peasants resisted and made a successful counter-attack, killing many noblemen during the battle. To prevent the rebels from continuing the war, the bishop and the leaders of the noblemen started negotiations with the rebels' envoys. Their compromise was recorded in the Kolozsmonostor Abbey on 6 July. The agreement reduced the tithe by half, abolished the ninth (a seigneurial tax), guaranteed the peasants' right to free movement and authorized them to hold an annual assembly to secure the execution of the agreement.

The three Estates of Transylvania - the (largely Hungarian noblemen, the counts of the free military Székelys and the delegates of the Saxon seats concluded a "brotherly union", Unio Trium Nationum, against their enemies at Kápolna (Căpâlna). The rebellious peasants left their camp and moved towards Dés (Dej). After a battle near the town, the parties concluded a new agreement on 6 October which increased the rent payable by the peasants to the landowners. Shortly thereafter, the peasants invaded the Kolozsmonostor Abbey and took possession of Kolozsvár and Nagyenyed (Aiud). The united armies of the voivode of Transylvania, the counts of the Székelys and the Saxon seats forced the rebels to surrender in January 1438. The leaders of the revolt were executed and other rioters were mutilated at the assembly of the representatives of the "Three Nations of Transylvania", the Unio Trium Nationum, in February.

== Background ==
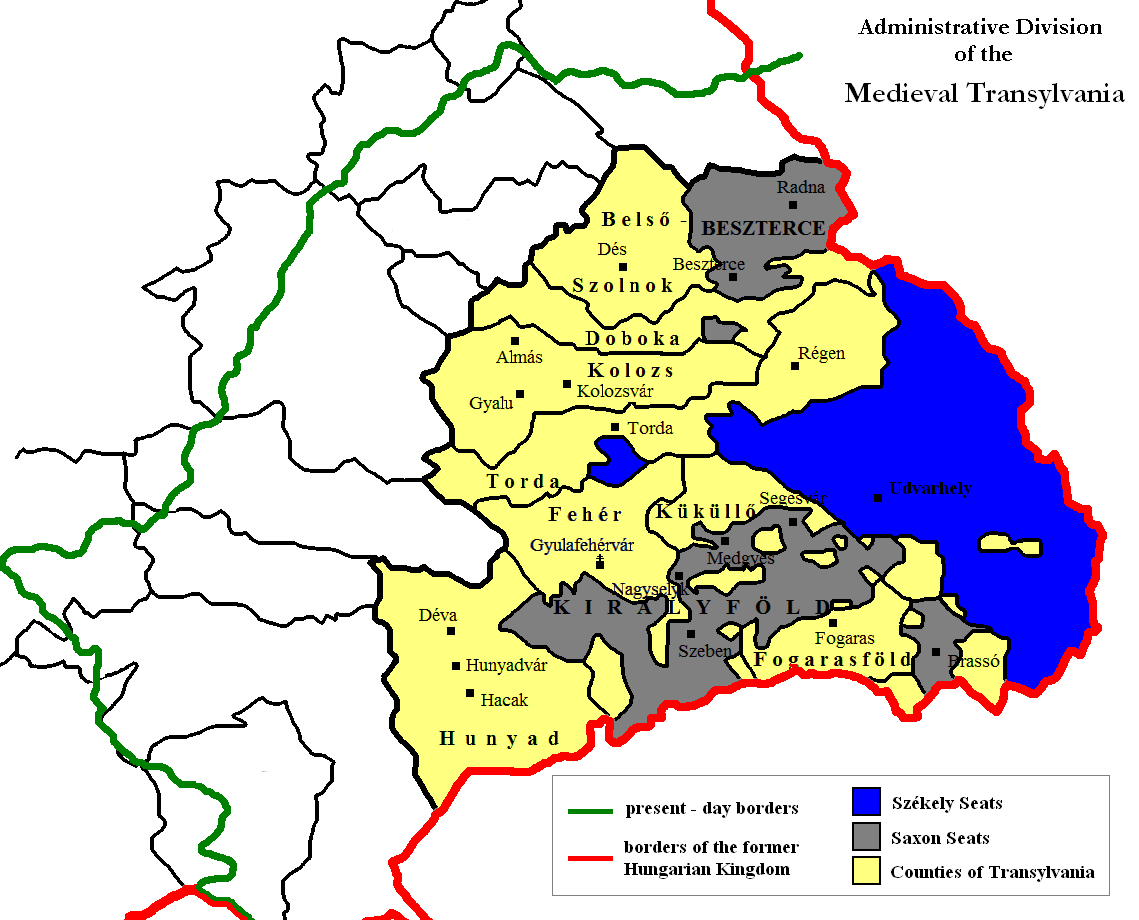
Administrative units in Transylvania in the Middle Ages

Transylvania ("the Land beyond the Forests") was a geographic region in the 15th-century Kingdom of Hungary. Four major ethnic groups – the Hungarians, Saxons, Székelys, and Vlachs (Romanians) – inhabited the territory. The Hungarians, the Hungarian-speaking Székelys, and the Saxons formed sedentary communities, living in villages and towns. Many of the Vlachs were shepherds, herding their flocks between the mountains and the lowlands, but the monarchs and other landowners granted them fiscal privileges to advance their settlement in arable lands from the second half of the century. The Vlachs initially enjoyed a special status, which included that they were to pay tax only on their sheep, but Vlach commoners who settled in royal or private estates quickly lost their liberties. For administrative purposes, Transylvania was divided into counties and seats. The seven Transylvanian counties were subjected to the authority of a high-ranking royal official, the voivode of Transylvania. The seats were the administrative units of the autonomous Saxon and Székely communities.

The voivodes presided over the general assemblies of the noblemen, occasionally attended by invited representatives of the Saxons and Székelys, and which were held annually at a meadow near Torda (Turda). From the early 15th century, the voivodes rarely visited Transylvania, leaving the administration of the counties to their deputies, the vice-voivodes. The Transylvanian noblemen were exempted from taxation in 1324. Noblemen were granted the right to administer justice to the peasants living in their estates in 1342. The prelates acquired the same right in their domains in the second half of the 14th century. In 1366, Louis I of Hungary decreed that an oath taken by a Vlach knez (or chieftain) who "had been brought" to his estate by royal writ was equal to a true nobleman's oath, but other knezes were on a equal footing with the heads of villages. The legal position of the knezes was similar to the "nobles of the Church" and other groups of conditional nobles, but the monarchs frequently rewarded them with true nobility. The ennobled Vlachs enjoyed the same privileges as their ethnic Hungarian peers, thus they became members of the "Hungarian nation", which at the time meant the community of noblemen. On the other hand, the Vlach commoners who lived on their estates lost their liberties.

The Székelys were a community of privileged border guards. They fought in the royal army, for which they were exempted from taxation. A royal official, the count of the Székelys, was their supreme leader, but the Székely seats were administered by elected officials. The Saxons also had the right to elect the magistrates of their seats. They enjoyed personal freedom and paid a lump sum tax to the monarchs. The wealthiest Saxon towns – Bistritz, Hermannstadt and Kronstadt (Bistrița, Sibiu and Brașov) – owned large estates which were cultivated by hundreds of peasants. Dozens of Saxons and Székely families held landed property in the counties, for which they also enjoyed the status of noblemen. Saxon and Székely leaders were occasionally invited to Torda to attend the general assemblies, which enabled the leaders of the three nations to coordinate their actions.

The towns from the counties, which were ruled by Hungarian noblemen, could hardly compete with the large Saxon centers. Kolozsvár, a city established as Klausenburg in the 13th century by the Saxons, who lost their majority status to the Hungarians during the 14th, was granted the right to buy landed property from the noblemen or other landowners in 1370, but its burghers were regarded as peasants by the bishops of Transylvania and the abbots of Kolozsmonostor Abbey, who forced them to pay the ninth (a seigneurial tax) on their vineyards until 1409. The merchants from Kolozsvár, Dés and other Transylvanian towns were exempted from internal levies, but the noblemen often ignored that privilege, forcing the merchants to pay duties while travelling across their domains.

The Hungarians, Saxons and Székelys adhered to Roman Catholicism. The Diocese of Transylvania included most of the province, but the Saxons of Southern Transylvania were subjected to the archbishops of Esztergom. Catholic commoners were to pay an ecclesiastic tax, the tithe, but John XXIII exempted the lesser noblemen from paying it in 1415. However, Transylvanian bishop George Lépes ignored this decision, especially after John had been declared an antipope. The Vlachs, who were Orthodox Christians, were originally also exempt from the ecclesiastic tax, but Sigismund of Luxemburg, king of Hungary, decreed that the Vlachs who settled on lands abandoned by Catholic peasants were to also pay the tithe. Sigismund was an absent monarch, deeply involved in European politics; he spent much time outside Hungary, especially in his other realms, such as Germany and Bohemia.

Starting in 1420, the Ottomans attacked Transylvania almost every year. The peasants had to pay for the increasing costs of anti-Ottoman defence. They were regularly obliged to pay "extraordinary taxes" in addition to the "chamber's profit" (the traditional tax payable by each peasant household to the royal treasury). The king also ordered that every tenth peasant should take up arms in case of an Ottoman attack, although peasants had always been exempt from military obligations. The accommodation of the troops was also an irksome duty, because the soldiers often forced the peasants to supply them with food and clothing. The landowners began to collect the ninth from the peasants. Although the ninth had already been introduced in 1351, it was not regularly collected in Transylvania. The noblemen also made attempts to hinder the free movement of their serfs.

The increasing taxes and the new burdens stirred up the commoners. The Transylvanian Saxons could only overcome their rebellious serfs with the assistance of the vice-voivode, Roland Lépes, in 1417. The united armies of the counties and the Saxon seats crushed the Székely commoners' uprising in 1433. In early 1434, the burghers of Kronstadt had to seek the assistance of the count of the Székelys against the Vlachs who had risen up in Fogaras County. Hussite ideas, especially their egalitarian Taborite version, began to spread among the peasantry in the 1430s. In May 1436, George Lépes urged the inquisitor James of the Marches to come to Transylvania, because Hussite preachers had converted many people to their faith in his diocese.

== Peasant war ==
=== Bishop Lépes's actions ===
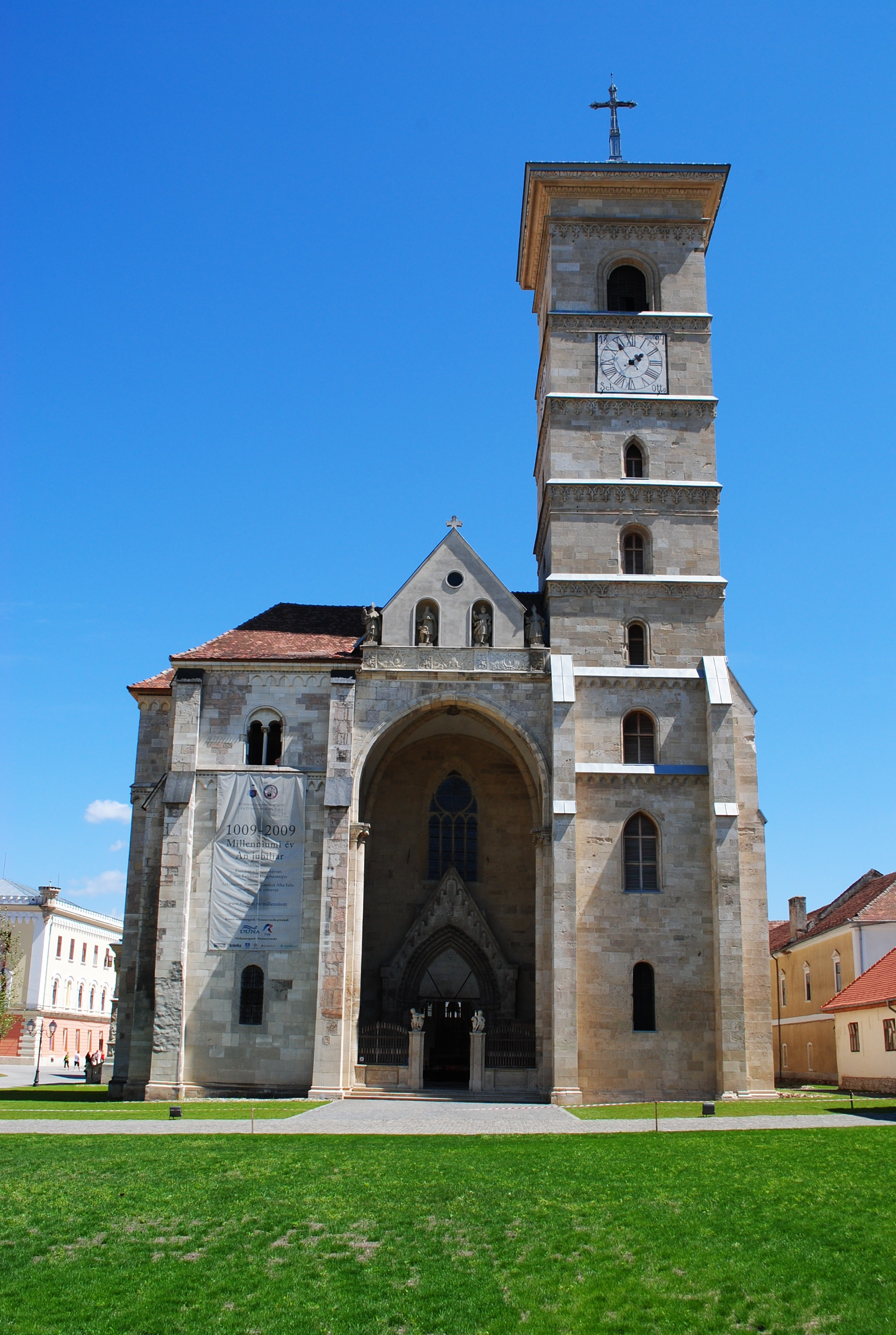
St. Michael's Cathedral in Gyulafehérvár (Alba Iulia): the see of the bishops of Transylvania

In order to tackle financial burdens resulting from the Hussite wars and military campaigns against the Ottoman Empire, Sigismund of Luxemburg put lower value silver coins into circulation in 1432. The new pennies were known as quarting because they contained only a quarter of the silver content of the old currency. Bishop Lépes, who knew that pennies of higher value would again be minted in a few years, suspended the collection of the tithe in 1434.

After the valuable coins were issued, Lépes demanded the tithe for the previous years in one sum. Historians estimate that the peasant families were required to pay six to nine gold florins, although the value of an average peasant lot was only about 40 florins. Most peasants were unable to pay this amount, especially because they also had to pay the seigneurial taxes to the owners of their parcels.

To secure the payment of the arrears, the bishop applied ecclesiastic penalties, placing whole villages under interdict in summer 1436. He also excommunicated the petty noblemen who had refused to pay the tithe. However, most serfs resisted and their lords were unwilling to assist the bishop. At the bishop's request, the king ordered the voivode and the ispáns (or heads) of the counties to secure the collection of the tithe in early September. The king also decreed that all peasants who failed to pay the arrears within a month after their excommunication were to pay twelve golden florins as a penalty.

=== Rebellion breaks out ===
The revolt developed from local disturbances in the first half of 1437. The villagers from Daróc, Mákó and Türe (Dorolțu, Macău and Turea) assaulted the abbot of Kolozsmonostor at Bogártelke (Băgara) in March. In Alsó-Fehér County and around Déva (Deva), the serfs gathered into small bands and attacked the noblemen's manors. Peasants from Alparét and Bogáta (Bogata de Sus) were the first to settle on the top of the nearby Mount Bábolna in May or June. Being surrounded by high cliffs and dense forests and crowned by a plateau of about 7–8 hectares (17–20 acres), the mountain was an ideal place for defence. Following the Taborites' military strategy, the rebels established a camp on the flat summit of the mountain.

A lesser nobleman, Antal Nagy de Buda, came with a group of peasants from Diós and Burjánosóbuda (Deușu and Vechea) to the mountain. The Vlach Mihai arrived with people from Virágosberek (Florești). Salt miners from Szék (Sic) and poor townspeople from Kolozsvár joined the peasantry. About 5–6,000 armed men gathered on the plateau by the end of June, according to historian Lajos Demény's estimation.

Bishop Lépes and his brother, the vice-voivode, started to assemble their troops near the peasants' camp. The absent voivode, Ladislaus Csáki, hurried to Transylvania. The counts of the Székelys, Michael Jakcs and Henry Tamási, also joined the united armies of the voivode and the bishop. The young noblemen who joined the campaign wanted to make a sudden assault on the peasants, but the bishop suggested that the peasants should be pacified through negotiations. The delay enabled the rioters to complete the fortification of their camp.

=== First battle and compromise ===
The peasants elected four envoys to inform the voivode about their grievances. They requested Csáki to put an end to abuses over the collection of the tithe and to persuade the bishop to lift the ecclesiastic bans. They also demanded the confirmation of the serfs' right to free movement. Instead of entering into negotiations, the voivode had the rebels' envoys tortured and executed in late June. He soon invaded the rebels' camp, but the peasants repulsed the attack and encircled his army. During the ensuing battle, many noblemen perished; Bishop Lépes barely escaped from the battlefield.

The representatives of the noblemen and the rebels entered into negotiations in early July. The rebels' deputies were appointed by their leaders, including Pál Nagy de Vajdaháza, who styled himself "the flag bearer of the universitas of the Hungarian and Vlach inhabitants of this part of Transylvania". The use of the term "universitas" evidences that the peasantry sought the acknowledgement of their liberties as a community. The peasants emphasized that they wanted to "regain their freedoms granted them by the ancient kings, freedoms that had been suppressed by all sorts of subterfuges", because they were convinced that their liberties had been recorded in a charter during the reign of the first king of Hungary, Saint Stephen. Their belief in a "good king" who had secured his subjects' welfare in a mythical "golden age" was not unusual in the Middle Ages.

The parties reached a compromise which was recorded in the Kolozsmonostor Abbey on 6 July. They agreed that the tithe would be reduced by half. The payment of the rents, taxes and other levies due to the landowners and the royal treasury was suspended until the tithe was collected. The agreement abolished the ninth and prescribed that the peasants were only required to pay the rent to the landowners. The annual amount of the rent was fixed at 10 denars, much lower than the rent from before the uprising. The noblemen also acknowledged the peasants' right to free movement, which could only be limited if a peasant failed to fulfill his obligations to the landowner. To keep the execution of the agreement under surveillance, the peasants were authorized to hold an annual assembly at Mount Bábolna. Their assembly was entitled to punish noblemen who had broken the compromise.

The Kolozsmonostor agreement prescribed that the "delegates of the noblemen and the inhabitants of the realm" should ask Sigismund of Luxemburg to send an authentic copy of Stephen's charter. The peasants agreed that the provisions of the charter were to be applied in case of a contradiction between the charter and the Kolozsmonostor agreement. The peasants preserved the right to elect delegates and start new negotiations with the representatives of the noblemen if Stephen's charter did not properly regulate their obligations towards the landowners.

=== Union of the Three Nations ===
The bishop and the noblemen regarded the Kolozsmonostor agreement as a temporary compromise. Their motives were to encourage the rebels to demobilize and to give them time to muster new troops. They assembled at Kápolna and started negotiations with the counts of the Székelys and the delegates of the Saxon seats. This was the first occasion when the representatives of the noblemen, Székelys and Saxons held a joint assembly without the authorization of the monarch. They concluded a "brotherly union" against their enemies in early September, pledging to provide military assistance to each other against both internal and foreign aggressors. The bishop seems to have acknowledged that petty noblemen were exempt from paying the tithe, according to Demény, because the Diet of Hungary decreed that noblemen could not be forced to pay the tithe in 1438.

=== Second battle and second compromise ===
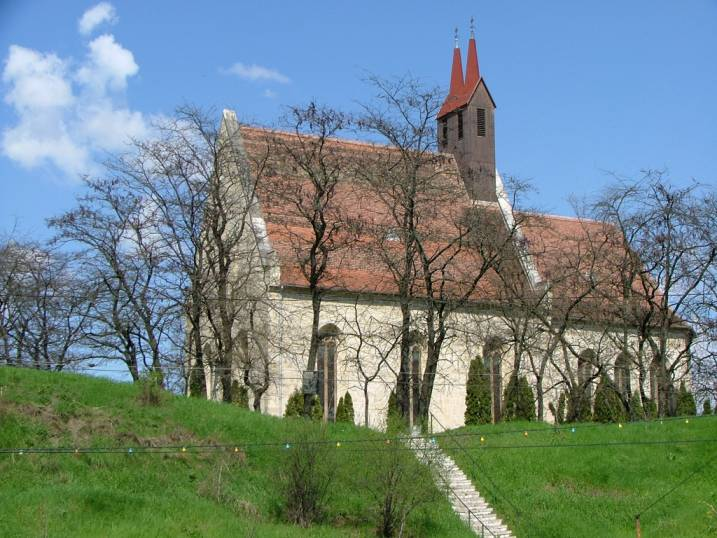
Kolozsmonostor Abbey (Mănăștur)

The rebels abandoned their fortified camp on Mount Bábolna, most probably because they needed new provisions. They moved towards Dés, pillaging the noblemen's manors during their march. They threatened all who did not support them with severe punishments. They established a new camp on the Szamos (Someș) River near the town. A new battle was fought between the rebels and their enemies near the camp in late September.

After being unable to overcome the rebels, the noblemen started new negotiations with them at Dellőapáti (Apatiu). The representatives of the two parties reached a new compromise on 6 October, which was included in a new charter in the Kolozsmonostor Abbey four days later. For unknown reasons, the peasants accepted less favorable terms than those of the first agreement. Demény argues, their leaders had most probably realized that they were unable to resist for a long time.

According to the new agreement, the minimum amount of the rent payable by the peasants to the landowners was increased to 12 denars per year; peasants who held larger plots were to pay 25 to 100 denars to their lords, which was equal to the sum payable before the uprising. The new agreement did not determine the "gifts" that the peasants were to give to the landowners, only stating that they were required to fulfill this obligation three times a year. The agreement confirmed the noblemen's right to administer justice to the peasants living in their estates, but also stipulated that the peasants could appeal against their lords' decision to the court of a nearby village or small town.

=== Last phase ===
The second agreement was again regarded as a provisional compromise by both parties. The charter prescribed that a joint delegation of the rebels and the noblemen should be sent to the king, who was staying in Prague, to seek his arbitration. There is no evidence of the appointment of the delegates or their departure for Prague. Sigismund of Luxemburg died on 9 December 1437.

Knowing that their camp on the Szamos could easily be attacked, the rebels marched towards Kolozsvár in October or November. They invaded and pillaged the Báthorys' estates at Fejérd (Feiurdeni). They also captured and beheaded many noblemen before attacking the abbey and forcing the abbot to flee. A group of rebels took possession of Nagyenyed with the assistance of its poor burghers and the inhabitants of the nearby villages. Most burghers of Kolozsvár also sympathized with the rebels, who thus entered the town without resistance. A Saxon charter recorded that Antal Nagy de Buda died fighting against the noblemen before 15 December. Demény refutes the credibility of the report, saying that all other sources indicate that the peasants were still resisting in January 1438.

The united armies of the new voivode, Desiderius Losonci, and Michael Jakcs laid siege to Kolozsvár. On 9 January, they sent a letter to the Saxon leaders, urging them to send reinforcements to contribute to the destruction of the "faithless peasants". During the siege, "not one soul could come out or go in" the town, according to the besiegers' report. The blockade caused a famine which forced the defenders to surrender before the end of January. The rebel groups around Nagyenyed were annihilated around the same time.

== Aftermath and assessment ==
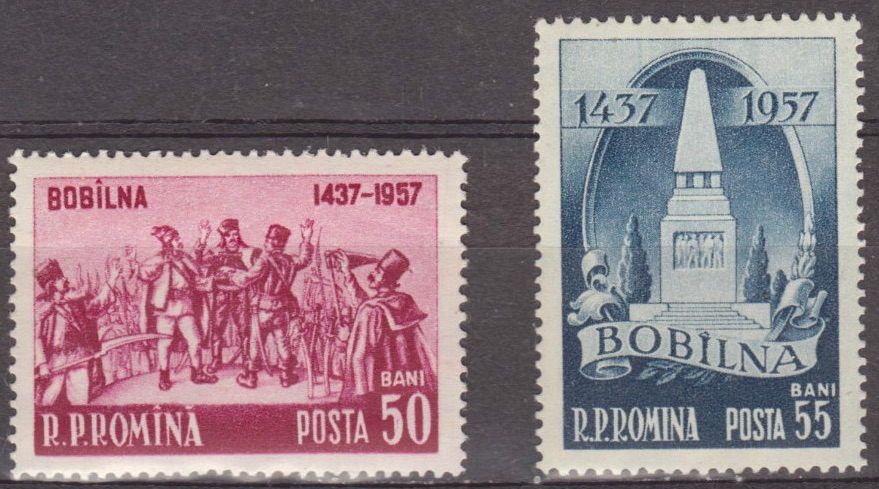
Pair of commemorative stamps issued by the Romanian People's Republic in 1957

The delegates of the three Estates of Transylvania, noblemen (including the ennobled Saxons and Vlachs), Székelys, and Saxons, assembled at Torda on 2 February 1438. They confirmed their "brotherly union" against the rebellious peasants and the Ottoman marauders. Nine leaders of the revolt were executed at the assembly. Other defenders of Kolozsvár were mutilated. Taking advantage of the victory, the leaders of the noblemen also made attempts to harm their personal enemies. For instance, the voivode who wanted to seize some properties of the Báthorys accused them of having cooperated with the rebels. In retaliation for its support of the rebels, Kolozsvár was deprived of its municipal rights on 15 November. However, the burghers attained the restoration of their liberties with the support of John Hunyadi on 21 September 1444.

Contemporaneous letters unanimously described the revolt as a peasant war against their lords. On 22 July 1437, the judge royal, Stephen Báthory, referred to the Transylvanian events as the "peasants' war"; on 30 September, Roland Lépes mentioned that a nobleman had been wounded "in the general fight against the peasantry"; and Bishop Lépes wrote of the "war of the peasants" on 27 January 1439. Other documents (including the records of the meetings of the town council of Nagyenyed) emphasized that craftsmen and townspeople also joined the revolt. No contemporaneous source recorded that national hatreds played any role in the uprising. On the contrary, the cooperation of the Hungarian and Vlach commoners during the rebellion is well-documented. The first compromise between the rebels and the noblemen explicitly mentioned their common grievances. For instance, the rebels complained that "both the Hungarians and the Vlachs who lived near castles" had arbitrarily been compelled to pay the tithes on their swines and bees.

Historian Joseph Held states, the "conservative stance of the Transylvanian peasant movement was similar to late medieval peasant movements elsewhere in Europe". The peasants only wanted to secure the abolition of new seigneurial duties and the restoration of the traditional level of their taxes, without calling into question the basic structure of the society. On the other hand, Lajos Demény writes, the movement developed into a "general attack against feudal society" in Transylvania. Both historians conclude that the rebels could not achieve their principal purposes. The peasants' right to free movement was partially restored, but the landowners were again able to reduce it during the last decade of the century. According to historian Jean Sedlar, Vlach peasants "occupied the lowest rung of the social ladder, superior only to slaves" in medieval Transylvania because of their Orthodox faith. However, no merely ethnic prejudice prevented Vlachs from acquiring land and joining the Hungarian noble class, provided they accepted Catholicism and adopted a noble life-style. At the same time, the fact that upward mobility required the renunciation of Vlach identity clearly hindered this group from developing a sense of ethnic solidarity.

== See also ==
- György Dózsa
- List of peasant revolts
- Popular revolts in late-medieval Europe
- Tuchin Revolt

== Sources ==
- Demény, Lajos (1987). Parasztfelkelés Erdélyben [A Peasant Revolt in Transylvania] (in Hungarian). Gondolat. ISBN 963-281-856-3.
- Engel, Pál (2001). The Realm of St Stephen: A History of Medieval Hungary, 895–1526. I.B. Tauris. ISBN 1-86064-061-3.
- Held, Joseph (1977). "The Peasant Revolt of Babolna, 1437–1438". Slavic Review. 36 (1): 25–38. doi:10.2307/2494669. JSTOR 2494669.
- Makkai, László (1994). "The Emergence of the Estates (1172–1526)". In Köpeczi, Béla; Barta, Gábor; Bóna, István; Makkai, László; Szász, Zoltán; Borus, Judit (eds.). History of Transylvania. Akadémiai Kiadó. pp. 178–243. ISBN 963-05-6703-2.
- Peter, Jordan (1998). "Romania". In Paulston, Christina Bratt; Peckham, Donald (eds.). Linguistic Minorities in Central and Eastern Europe. Multilingual Matters. pp. 184–223. ISBN 978-1-85359-416-8.
- Pop, Ioan-Aurel (2003). "Nations and Denominations in Transylvania (13th–14th Century)". In Lévai, Csaba; Vese, Vasile (eds.). Tolerance and Intolerance in Historical Perspective. Plus. pp. 111–123. ISBN 88-8492-139-2.
- Pop, Ioan-Aurel (2005). "The Romanians in the 14th–16th centuries from the "Christian Republic" to the "Restoration of Dacia"". In Pop, Ioan-Aurel; Bolovan, Ioan (eds.). History of Romania: Compendium. Romanian Cultural Institute (Center for Transylvanian Studies). pp. 209–314. ISBN 978-973-7784-12-4.
- Sedlar, Jean W. (1994). East Central Europe in the Middle Ages, 1000–1500. University of Washington Press. ISBN 0-295-97290-4.
