= Raynald of Belleville =

Hungarian prelate

Raynald
- Bishop of Transylvania
- Installed: May 1222
- Term ended: 11 April 1241
- Predecessor: William
- Successor: Artolf
- Previous post: Provost of Várad

Orders
- Consecration: July 1222 by Ugrin Csák, Archbishop of Kalocsa

Personal details
- Born: Belleville, Duchy of Normandy
- Died: 11 April 1241 Mohi, Kingdom of Hungary
- Denomination: Catholic

Raynald of Belleville (French: Renaud de Belleville, Hungarian: Belleville-i Rajnáld; died 11 April 1241) was a Norman-born Hungarian prelate and diplomat in the 13th century, who served as the Bishop of Transylvania from 1222, until his death.

== Early career ==
Raynald (also Reynald or Reginald) was born in Belleville near the city Rouen ("Belevile prope Rothomagum") in the Duchy of Normandy, thus he was a subject of the kings of England during that time, until 1204, when Philip II of France conquered Normandy. In contrast, historian Gergely Kiss argued Raynald originated from Belleville in the Kingdom of France (now a neighbourhood in Paris), but this is contradicted by the account of Flemish traveller William of Rubruck. It is unknown under what circumstances he came to Hungary. Kiss considered Raynald was a Franciscan friar and arrived to the kingdom in order to convert the pagan Cumans along the eastern border. According to the account of William of Rubruck from 1253, Raynald had an unidentified nephew, who was abducted by the Mongols from Gyulafehérvár (present-day Alba Iulia, Romania) during the 1241–1242 invasion of Hungary and lived in Karakorum when the explorer met him. William also met a certain Basilius there, who was also born in Hungary as a son of an Englishman. Historian György Györffy considered the identification between the two persons (Raynald's nephew and Basilius).

Arriving Hungary, Raynald entered the service of King Andrew II of Hungary by 1213, when he already held the dignity of provost of the cathedral chapter of Várad (present-day Oradea Mare, Romania). In that year, Raynald performed a diplomatic mission to the Kingdom of England. According to a register, John, King of England instructed his treasury officials in October 1213 to take care of the expenses of diplomats residing in the country, Simon, a nepos of papal legate Niccolò de Romanis and provost Raynald, envoy of the Hungarian king. The officials were to provide Raynald with two horses and two saddles. The provost then belonged to the entourage of John, who left Westminster for Freemantle in those days. The goal of his mission was a proposed marriage between Andrew's son and heir Duke Béla and one of the daughters of King John. A record of the Regestrum Varadinense from 1215 mentions Raynald as provost of Várad too; he judged over a trial by ordeal (of red-hot iron), acquitting the accused local from Gyán. Historian Dániel Bácsatyai considered Reynald was perhaps also a member of that Hungarian delegation led by John, Archbishop of Esztergom, which was present in England on 7 July 1220, when Thomas Becket's remains were moved from his first tomb to a shrine, in the recently completed Trinity Chapel. Raynald held the provostship of Várad until 1222. In addition, he also possessed an undetermined benefice in Transylvania, while serving as provost.

== Bishop ==
William, Bishop of Transylvania died in 1221. Raynald was elected as his successor shortly after the issuance of the Golden Bull in April 1222. He first appears as bishop-elect around May 1222. It is possible he was the candidate of King Andrew II. However, his superior Ugrin Csák, Archbishop of Kalocsa contested the election due to the one-eyed Raynald's half-blindness. Thereafter, Raynald traveled to Alatri with Ugrin's letter containing his objection, where he made a good impression on Pope Honorius III, who confirmed his election on 3 June 1222. The pope instructed Ugrin Csák to consecrate Raynald in his reply letter. The papal decree arrived to Hungary in mid-July 1222, when the archbishop finally consecrated Raynald as the Bishop of Transylvania.

Immediately after his election, Raynald had to deal with the case of the Teutonic Knights, who were granted Burzenland (Barcaság, present-day Romania), the sparsely populated southeastern part of Transylvania by Andrew II in 1211. Burzenland was placed under the direct jurisdiction of the Holy See by Pope Honorius in 1218, which resulted an emerged tension between the Diocese of Transylvania and the Teutonic Order. When Andrew II confirmed the grant in May 1222, the king emphasized that Burzenland belonged to the sovereignty of his Crown and the knights were also subjects to the authority of the Bishopric of Transylvania. Although Pope Honorius acknowledged Andrew's charter at the end of 1222, the Teutonic Knights and their Grand Master Hermann von Salza began a diplomatic campaign. Pope Honorius instructed Thomas, Bishop of Eger in January 1223 to appoint a suitable archdeacon or deacon over the clerics of Burzenland, who is introduced to him by the Teutonic Knights, which instruction seriously violated Raynald's sovereignty. The papal decree also put into perspective the creation of a separate bishopric in case of population growth. Raynald protested against the decision and sent his complaints to the Roman Curia. In response (and after a complaint from Hermann von Salza), Pope Honorius reprimanded Raynald with harsh words in December 1223 not to dare to exercise episcopal powers over the territory of Burzenland held by Teutonic Order. Simultaneously, the pope also sent a letter to Archbishop John of Esztergom (who, however, died by then) to investigate and invalidate Raynald's actions. The documents reveal that Raynald completely neglected his predecessor William's letter of privilege to the Teutonic Order concluded in 1213. For instance, he made it obligatory for local clerics in Burzenlamd to attend the bishopric's synods and collected tithe not only from Hungarians and Székelys in the region but also from anyone (i.e. German colonists too) who lived there, threatening the resistance with excommunication. Following Honorius' letter, Reynald sought and gained political support from Andrew II and the prelates of Hungary. In April 1224, Pope Honorius placed Burzenland and the neighboring territory beyond the Carpathian Mountains, where the Cumans lived (i.e. future Wallachia), under the protection of the Holy See, granting full ecclesiastical autonomy to the Teutonic Order over these lands. Andrew II launched a campaign against the Teutonic Knights, who thus were forced to leave Burzenland and the neighboring lands in 1225. Despite that, the Bishopric of Transylvania was unable to regain Burzenland and Raynald litigated in vain over the jurisdiction of the parishes there. The territory was placed under the jurisdiction of the Archdiocese of Esztergom, establishing the Deanery of Burzenland.

Raynald had a conflict of jurisdiction with the Kolozsmonostor Abbey, disputing the Benedictines' privileges and exemptions, similarly to his predecessors Adrian and William. Pope Honorius ordered an investigation in June 1222, because Raynald's predecessors did not shy away from physical atrocity to assert their perceived rights. The pope directly subordinated the abbey to the Holy See. Unlike the two aforementioned bishops, Raynald tried to assert his episcopal jurisdiction through legal means instead of violence. Around 1228, he petitioned to the Roman Curia and Pope Gregory IX entrusted his papal legate sub-deacon Egidius to mediate between the two parties on the spot. Both the Benedictine monks and Raynald appealed to the Roman Curia. The papal legate summoned them to Rome in November 1231, but only a representative of Raynald appeared there. Thereafter, Pope Gregory entrusted Bulcsú Lád, the Bishop of Csanád to investigate the jurisdictional conflict in September 1232, but the abbot refused to attend again. Papal legate James of Pecorara was granted the same mandate in October 1232. Both parties appeared before the pope's envoy in Buda. According to the abbot, Raynald ignored and violated the monastery's privileges and rights, while Raynald accused the convention of violating his episcopal rights, usurping the tithe. Cardinal Otto of Tonengo took over the litigation from James in 1234. The pope delegated Bulcsú Lád and two other clerics – the Bishop of Cumania (possibly Theodoric) and the provost of Bethlen (present-day Beclean, Romania) – to judge over the lawsuit in November 1235. In accordance with the verdict, the right of tithe collection remained to the abbot on the estates of the Kolozsmonostor Abbey, which was permanently placed under the jurisdiction of the Archdiocese of Esztergom.

Alberic of Trois-Fontaines writes that a Cuman chieftain's son visited Robert, Archbishop of Esztergom in Hungary in 1227, asking the archbishop to baptize him and his 12 retainers. Robert accepted the offer and went to Transylvania with three Hungarian prelates: Bartholomew le Gros, Bishop of Pécs; Bartholomew, Bishop of Veszprém, and Raynald of Belleville. According to the chronicle of Emo of Friesland, they met the Cuman chieftain Bortz and baptized him and his retainers in the presence of Duke Béla. When Ugrin Csák asked for permission to establish a Roman Catholic diocese in Syrmia in order to facilitate the conversation of Bosnian heretics, Pope Gregory commissioned Raynald and Desiderius, Bishop of Csanád to investigate the legitimacy of the request. After their report, the pope approved the establishment of the Diocese of Syrmia in January 1229. With the consent of Raynald, the church of Németi (present-day Satu Mare, Romania), inhabited by German colonists, was exempted from the jurisdiction of the archdeacon of Sásvár, and was granted the right of free election of parish priest by Andrew II in 1230. Raynald was among the prelates, who took an oath to the agreement at Bereg in the presence of papal legate James of Pecorara in early 1234. Raynald of Belleville was killed in the Battle of Mohi on 11 April 1241, when the Hungarian royal army suffered a catastrophic defeat against the invader Mongols. The Diocese of Transylvania was completely looted and destroyed with its episcopal see Gyulafehérvár.

== Sources ==
- Bácsatyai, Dániel (2017). "II. András angliai követei [King Andrew II's Envoys in England]". Történelmi Szemle (in Hungarian). 59 (4). Hungarian Academy of Sciences: 621–632. ISSN 0040-9634.
- Barabás, Gábor (2015). A pápaság és Magyarország a 13. század első felében. Pápai hatás – együttműködés – érdekellentét [The Papacy and Hungary in the First Half of the 13th Century. Papal influence – cooperation – clash of interests] (in Hungarian). Pécsi Történettudományért Kulturális Egyesület. ISBN 978 963 89482 5 0.
- Kiss, Gergely (2013). "11–13. századi magyar főpapok francia kapcsolatai [French Connections of 11–13th-Century Hungarian Prelates]". In Györkös, Attila; Kiss, Gergely (eds.). Francia-magyar kapcsolatok a középkorban (in Hungarian). Debrecen University Press. pp. 341–350. ISBN 978-963-473-617-2.
- Pósán, László (2021). Hungary and the Teutonic Order in the Middle Ages. Arpadiana VI., Research Centre for the Humanities. ISBN 978-963-416-247-6.
- Temesváry, János (1922). Erdély középkori püspökei [Medieval Bishops of Transylvania] (in Hungarian). Minerva Irodalmi és Nyomdai Műintézet.
- Zsoldos, Attila (2011). Magyarország világi archontológiája, 1000–1301 [Secular Archontology of Hungary, 1000–1301] (in Hungarian). História, MTA Történettudományi Intézete. ISBN 978-963-9627-38-3.
- Zsoldos, Attila (2022). Az Aranybulla királya [The King of the Golden Bull] (in Hungarian). Városi Levéltár és Kutatóintézet. ISBN 978-963-8406-26-2.

Catholic Church titles
Preceded by William	Bishop of Transylvania; 1222–1241	Succeeded by Artolf
