= György Jakubinyi =

Romanian cleric

His Excellency György-Miklós Jakubínyi
- Archbishop of Alba Iulia
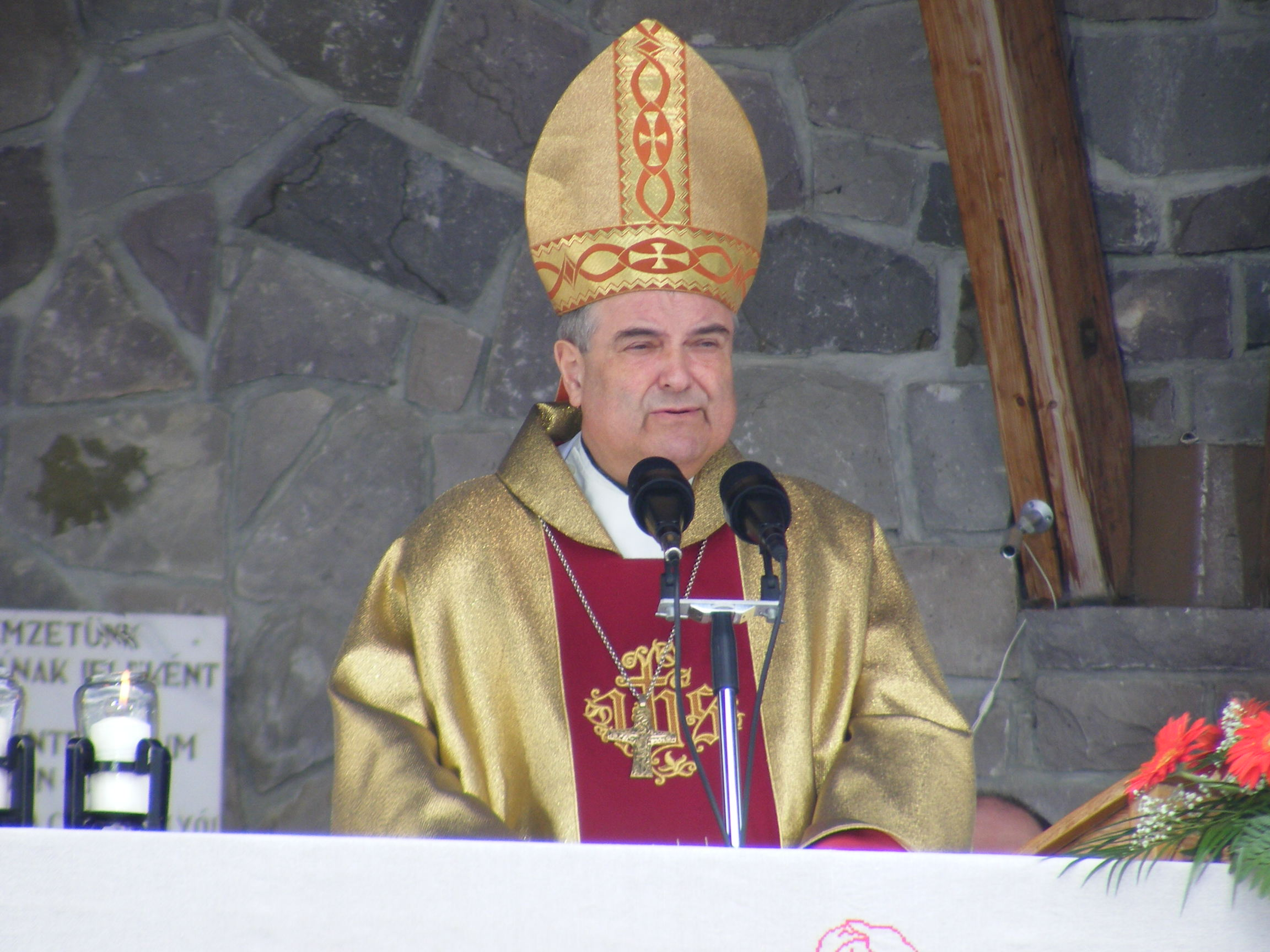
- Jakubinyi in 2010
- Church: Roman Catholic
- Archdiocese: Roman Catholic Archdiocese of Alba Iulia
- Appointed: 8 April 1994
- Term ended: December 24, 2019
- Predecessor: Lajos Bálint
- Successor: Gergely Kovács
- Other post: Auxiliary Bishop of Alba Iulia (1990-1994)

Orders
- Ordination: 13 April 1969
- Consecration: 29 April 1990 by Francesco Colasuonno

Personal details
- Born: 13 February 1946 (age 80) Sighetu Marmației, Romania

György Miklós Jakubinyi (born 13 February 1946) is a Romanian cleric, the former archbishop of the Roman Catholic Archdiocese of Alba Iulia. Born into an ethnic Hungarian family in Sighetu Marmației, he attended school in his native town from 1952 to 1963 before beginning his religious training that year at the Roman Catholic Theological Institute of Alba Iulia. Ordained a priest in 1969 by Áron Márton, he was consecrated auxiliary bishop at Șumuleu Ciuc in 1990. The following year, he became administrator of the Ordinariate for Catholics of Armenian Rite in Romania. He was made archbishop in 1994, and retired in 2019.
