= Șura =

Șura may refer to one of two places in Sibiu County, Romania:

- Șura Mare
- Șura Mică
