= William (bishop of Transylvania) =

13th-century Hungarian Catholic prelate

- Bishop of Transylvania
- Installed: 1201/1204
- Term ended: 1221
- Predecessor: Adrian
- Successor: Raynald of Belleville

Personal details
- Died: 1221
- Denomination: Catholic Church

William (Hungarian: Vilmos; died 1221) was a Hungarian Catholic prelate in the 13th century, who served as the Bishop of Transylvania at least from 1204 until his death.

== Election ==
It is plausible that William (also Villermus, Guilelmus or Wilhelmus, among others) was of foreign origin. Historian Attila Zsoldos considered that William arrived to Hungary as a member of the entourage of Queen Constance of Aragon, the spouse of Emeric, King of Hungary in 1198. He was elected Bishop of Transylvania sometime between 1201 (his predecessor Adrian is last mentioned in that year) and 1204 (William's first appearance in contemporary records). It is possible that William was among those prelates, who accompanied Queen Constance, when she fled Hungary to the Duchy of Austria, taking her son King Ladislaus III with her in the spring of 1205, because the king's regent and uncle Andrew ignored their interests. After the sudden death of Ladislaus, William returned to Hungary and swore loyalty to Andrew, who ascended the Hungarian throne.

== Bishop ==
Pope Innocent III instructed William in July 1211 to investigate the election of a certain magister "R." as provost of Szeben (present-day Sibiu, Romania), and, if he does not object according to canon law, confirm him on behalf of the pope. In the same year, his metropolitan, Berthold, the Archbishop of Kalocsa attempted to transform the provostship of Szeben, which was established around 1189 in order to represent the Transylvanian Saxons into a bishopric within the ecclesiastical authority of Kalocsa. However, Pope Innocent III refused this plan in February 1212; the pope argued that step would violate the rights of William, Bishop of Transylvania, which obviously means that the new bishopric would have united all the German churches in Transylvania and the provostship of Szeben, which would have been the basis of the planned bishopric.

During William's episcopate, King Andrew II of Hungary granted the region Burzenland (Barcaság, present-day Romania), the sparsely populated southeastern part of Transylvania, to the Teutonic Order in 1211. The knights were to defend the easternmost regions of the Kingdom of Hungary against the Cumans and encourage their conversion to Catholicism. The monarch also granted privileges to the order in 1212. William supported the settlement of the Teutonic Order. The bishop issued a privilege letter in 1213; in the document, he transferred the church tithe located in Burzenland to the knights regarding the Saxons and the peoples (i.e. Germans) settled by the knights, although the Hungarians and Székelys in the region continued to be obliged to pay the tithe to the Diocese of Transylvania (thus preventing the knights from inviting settlers from the surrounding Transylvanian areas to Burzenland). In addition, William also decided to transfer his right of patronage over the parishes in Burzenland to the Teutonic Order. William only kept to himself that the priests of the parishes were obliged to visitation to his episcopal court after their election. The local clergy were also obliged to provide William with hospitality. In case of crimes, the clergymen – including knights of the chivalry order – were subordinated to the bishop's court of justice. According to historian László Pósán, William, while provided many discounts to the Teutonic Order, clearly outlined his powers and authority as diocesan bishop over Burzenland. The Teutonic Order requested Pope Honorius III to transcribe and confirm William's privilege letter in April 1218.

The cordial relationship between William and the Teutonic Order had deteriorated from late 1216, when Pope Honorius prohibited the knights from accepting conditional grants from secular sources. The Holy See decided to exempt the Teutonic Order from episcopal authority everywhere in October 1218, which also affected negatively William's ecclesiastical jurisdiction over Burzenland, despite the aforementioned confirmation of his 1213 privilege letter. William was reluctant to accept the papal decree, instead, he sent his complaints to the royal court of Andrew II.

Similarly to his predecessor Adrian, William had a violent conflict with the Kolozsmonostor Abbey, disputing the Benedictines' privileges and exemptions. Around 1220, William attempted to resolve the conflict by force. According to a letter of Pope Honorius issued in June 1222, the late William forcibly entered the monastery with four canons and his episcopal army, torched the abbey's papal privilege letters, drowned the royal privilege letter, looted and damaged the local church and buildings, tied the abbot and two friars up and imprisoned them, drove out the monks and filled the vacant places with his own followers, who completely squandered the wealth of the abbey, which thus came to the brink of starvation. William died in 1221. A single source from that year refers to the episcopal see as vacant. He was succeeded by the French-born prelate Raynald of Belleville, who was elected as bishop in the first half of 1222.

== Sources ==
- Kiss, Gergely (2013). Királyi egyházak a középkori Magyarországon [Royal Churches in Medieval Hungary] (in Hungarian). Pécsi Történettudományért Kulturális Egyesület. ISBN 978-963-642-442-8.
- Pósán, László (2021). Hungary and the Teutonic Order in the Middle Ages. Arpadiana VI., Research Centre for the Humanities. ISBN 978-963-416-247-6.
- Temesváry, János (1922). Erdély középkori püspökei [Medieval Bishops of Transylvania] (in Hungarian). Minerva Irodalmi és Nyomdai Műintézet.
- Zsoldos, Attila (2011). Magyarország világi archontológiája, 1000–1301 [Secular Archontology of Hungary, 1000–1301] (in Hungarian). História, MTA Történettudományi Intézete. ISBN 978-963-9627-38-3.
- Zsoldos, Attila (2022). Az Aranybulla királya [The King of the Golden Bull] (in Hungarian). Városi Levéltár és Kutatóintézet. ISBN 978-963-8406-26-2.

Catholic Church titles
Preceded by Adrian	Bishop of Transylvania; 1204–1221	Succeeded by Raynald of Belleville
