= Gergely Kovács =

Gergely Kovács may refer to:

- Gergely Kovács (bishop)
- Gergely Kovács (politician)
