= Antal Nagy =

Antal Nagy may refer to:

- Antal Nagy (footballer born 1944), Hungarian footballer
- Antal Nagy (footballer born 1956), Hungarian footballer
- Antal Nagy de Buda, Hungarian petty nobleman
