= Simon (bishop of Transylvania) =

Hungarian bishop

- Bishop of Transylvania
- Installed: c. 1111
- Term ended: after 1113
- Predecessor: Franco (?)
- Successor: Peter (?)

Personal details
- Died: after 1113
- Denomination: Roman Catholic

Simon was a Hungarian prelate in the 12th century, who served as the first certainly known Bishop of Transylvania during the reign of Coloman, King of Hungary. His name is mentioned by two royal charters of Coloman issued regarding the Zobor Abbey in 1111 and 1113.

== Sources ==
- Temesváry, János (1922). Erdély középkori püspökei [Medieval Bishops of Transylvania] (in Hungarian). Minerva Irodalmi és Nyomdai Műintézet.
- Zsoldos, Attila (2011). Magyarország világi archontológiája, 1000–1301 [Secular Archontology of Hungary, 1000–1301] (in Hungarian). História, MTA Történettudományi Intézete. ISBN 978-963-9627-38-3.

Catholic Church titles
Preceded by Franco (?)	Bishop of Transylvania fl. 1111–1113	Succeeded by Peter (?)
