= Peter of Transylvania =

Peter of Transylvania may refer to:

- Peter (bishop of Transylvania, fl. 1134)
- Peter Monoszló, Bishop of Transylvania (1270–1307)
