= Vilcina =

Hungarian bishop

- Bishop of Transylvania
- Installed: before 1166
- Term ended: after 1169
- Predecessor: Walter (1157)
- Successor: Paul (1181)

Personal details
- Died: after 1169
- Denomination: Roman Catholic

Vilcina was a Hungarian prelate in the 12th century, who served as Bishop of Transylvania around the years from 1166 to 1169, during the reign of Stephen III of Hungary.

Vilcina or Wulcina was elected bishop sometime after 1157 (or 1158), when his last known predecessor Walter is mentioned in this capacity. Vilcina first appears as bishop of Transylvania in October 1166, when he was among the witnesses in a royal charter of Stephen III, who confirmed a land transaction between a certain Vitus and the Knights Hospitaller. Vilcina also acted as a witness in 1169, when Stephen III confirmed the privileges of the burghers of Šibenik. Vilcina held the position of bishop until 1181 at the latest, when Paul is mentioned in this capacity.

== Sources ==
- Temesváry, János (1922). Erdély középkori püspökei [Medieval Bishops of Transylvania] (in Hungarian). Minerva Irodalmi és Nyomdai Műintézet.
- Zsoldos, Attila (2011). Magyarország világi archontológiája, 1000–1301 [Secular Archontology of Hungary, 1000–1301] (in Hungarian). História, MTA Történettudományi Intézete. ISBN 978-963-9627-38-3.

Catholic Church titles
Preceded by Walter (?)	Bishop of Transylvania; 1166–1169	Succeeded by Paul (?)
