= Peter (archbishop of Kalocsa) =

Hungarian bishop

- Archbishop of Kalocsa
- Installed: 1190
- Term ended: 1192
- Predecessor: Paul
- Successor: Saul Győr
- Other post: Archbishop of Split

Personal details
- Died: 1192
- Denomination: Roman Catholic
- Parents: Chitelen

Peter (Hungarian: Péter, Croatian: Petar; died 1192) was a Hungarian prelate in the twelfth century, who served as Archbishop of Split (Spalato) from 1185 to 1190, then briefly Archbishop of Kalocsa from 1190 until his death.

== Ancestry ==
Peter was born into a wealthy and influential Hungarian kindred as the son of a certain Chitelen or Chitlen (Hungarian: Ketelény or Csetlény), according to Thomas the Archdeacon's Historia Salonitana. Historian Gyula Városy claimed Peter originated from the Siklós branch of the gens (clan) Kán. He argued King Béla III referred to him as patron of the monastery of Holy Trinity near Pécs in 1183, which right of benefice later belonged to the Siklósi family, descending from the Kán kindred, in 1283 and 1303. Historians Gyula Pauler and Bálint Hóman accepted the argument. Contrary to this, János Karácsonyi noted the Siklósis' right of patronage a century later could be result of a later royal donation or purchase.

Historian Mór Wertner connected his person to the gens (clan) Szalók. The 1183 diploma says Paul Záh, died without male heirs, left his land of Töttös to the monasteries of Holy Trinity and Ókor. Simultaneously, he requested their patrons, Archbishop Peter of Split and Baja Szalók, respectively, to confirm the donation. By 1346, both monasteries and Töttös belonged to the property of the Szalók kindred, thus Peter was also a member of the clan, according to Wertner. Scholar József Udvardy, similarly to Karácsonyi, emphasized that there is no direct connection between the two sources, and the ownership of Töttös could be a later development too.

== Archbishop ==
Peter started his career as a physician of King Béla III. After the death of Byzantine Emperor Manuel I Komnenos on 24 September 1180, the Hungarian monarch had restored his suzerainty in Dalmatia within months. The citizens of Split "returned to Hungarian lordship" soon after Manuel's death, according to the 13th-century Thomas the Archdeacon. The chronicler narrates, Béla III wished the burghers of Split to elect a Hungarian national as archbishop of Split in order to fill the dignity, which remained vacant since the death of Christian martyr Saint Raynerius, who was stoned to death in a dispute on 4 August 1180. However, the citizens refused to elect the king's protegee Peter and petitioned to the Holy See. In 1181, Pope Alexander III urged Béla III to respect the burghers of Split's privilege to free elect of their archbishop.

Under the pressure of the Hungarians, despite the intervention of the Roman Curia, Peter was elected Archbishop of Split by the local citizens in 1185. Nevertheless, Peter already acted as de facto prelate in the previous years, and royal charters in Hungary styled him as Archbishop of Split since 1180. For instance, Peter donated the St. George church near Senj to the Knights Templar in 1183. As an elected and confirmed archbishop, Peter convened a provincial synod and reorganized the administration of the archdiocese of Split in 1185. Among others, he established the bishopric of Krbava (Corbavia), which became a new suffragan see of the Archdiocese of Split. The new bishopric lasted until the second half of the 15th century, when it was collapsed due to the Ottoman advance in Dalmatia. Peter consecrated its first bishop, Matthew still in that year. The aforementioned provincial synod under the chairmanship of Peter also subordinated the actual and titular bishoprics in Dalmatia and the surrounding Hungarian-dominated areas in the territory of present-day Serbia and Bosnia and Herzegovina – Makarska, Duvno, Bosnia, Narona and Sztón – to the Archdiocese of Split and determined its borders, elevating the numbers of suffragans to twelve; Knin (Tinnin), Senj, Nona, Trogir, Skradin and Fara already belonged to it. Pope Clement III confirmed the resolutions of the synod in 1191.

Peter had various conflicts of interest with the cathedral chapter of Split, according to Thomas the Archdeacon. Following the death of Paul, Peter was transferred to the Archdiocese of Kalocsa around 1190. According to a non-authentic charter, Peter already held the dignity in 1190. Peter's namesake successor, who was abbot of Pannonhalma prior to that, in the Archdiocese of Split already appears in 1191. Peter was first referred to as Archbishop of Kalocsa by an authentic document in 1192. He died soon, as Saul Győr succeeded him still in that year.

== Sources ==
=== Primary sources ===
- Archdeacon Thomas of Split: History of the Bishops of Salona and Split (Latin text by Olga Perić, edited, translated and annotated by Damir Karbić, Mirjana Matijević Sokol and James Ross Sweeney) (2006). CEU Press. ISBN 963-7326-59-6.

=== Secondary studies ===
- Gál, Judit (2014). ""Qui erat gratiosus aput eum" A spliti érsekek szerepe az Árpádok királyságában ["Qui erat gratious aput eum" The Role of the Archbishops of Split in the Kingdom of Hungary 1113–1248]". In Belucz, Mónika; et al. (eds.). Magister historiae (in Hungarian). Eötvös Loránd University. pp. 53–71. ISBN 978-963-284-527-2.
- Udvardy, József (1991). A kalocsai érsekek életrajza (1000–1526) [Biographies of Archbishops of Kalocsa, 1000–1526] (in Hungarian). Görres Gesellschaft.
- Zsoldos, Attila (2011). Magyarország világi archontológiája, 1000–1301 [Secular Archontology of Hungary, 1000–1301] (in Hungarian). História, MTA Történettudományi Intézete. ISBN 978-963-9627-38-3.

Catholic Church titles
Preceded by Raynerius	Archbishop of Split; 1180/85–1190	Succeeded by Peter VII
Preceded by Paul	Archbishop of Kalocsa; 1190–1192	Succeeded by Saul Győr
