= Walter (bishop of Transylvania) =

Hungarian bishop

- Bishop of Transylvania
- Installed: before 1156
- Term ended: after 1157 (or 1158)
- Predecessor: Baranus (1139)
- Successor: Vilcina (1166)

Personal details
- Died: after 1157 (or 1158)
- Denomination: Roman Catholic

Walter (Hungarian: Valter) was a Hungarian prelate in the 12th century, who served as Bishop of Transylvania around from 1156 to 1157 (or 1158), during the reign of Géza II of Hungary.

== Career ==
It is uncertain whether he is identical with that namesake prelate, who was Bishop of Várad from around 1124 to 1138. Walter was elected Bishop of Transylvania sometime after 1139, when his last known predecessor Baranus is mentioned in this capacity.

The name of Walter appear four royal charters in the period between 1156 and 1157. He was among the testimonies in 1156, when Martyrius, Archbishop of Esztergom donated the tithe of surrounding 70 villages to the cathedral chapter of Esztergom. His name is also mentioned, when King Géza II confirmed this donation in the same year. Walter again acted as a testimony in March 1157, when Gervasius, Bishop of Győr interceded with Géza II to grant the collection right of salt duties to the archdiocese at Nána and Kakat (present-day Štúrovo, Slovakia). A non-authentic royal charter allegedly issued in 1158, which contains that Géza II reissued the lost privilege letters of the Pécsvárad Abbey, mentions Walter as bishop too. According to the 18th-century historian Miklós Schmitth, Archbishop Martyrius asked Walter to embrace and support the Transylvanian Saxons, who were settled during the reign of Géza II. Walter held his dignity until 1166 at the latest, when Vilcina is first mentioned as bishop.

== Sources ==
- Temesváry, János (1922). Erdély középkori püspökei [Medieval Bishops of Transylvania] (in Hungarian). Minerva Irodalmi és Nyomdai Műintézet.
- Zsoldos, Attila (2011). Magyarország világi archontológiája, 1000–1301 [Secular Archontology of Hungary, 1000–1301] (in Hungarian). História, MTA Történettudományi Intézete. ISBN 978-963-9627-38-3.

Catholic Church titles
Preceded by Baranus (?)	Bishop of Transylvania; 1156–1157	Succeeded by Vilcina (?)
