= Adrian (bishop of Transylvania) =

Hungarian bishop

- Bishop of Transylvania
- Installed: 1186/1192
- Term ended: 1201/1204
- Predecessor: Paul
- Successor: William
- Other posts: Grand Provost of Esztergom; Provost of Buda; Chancellor

Personal details
- Died: after 1201
- Denomination: Roman Catholic
- Education: Abbey of Saint Genevieve

Adrian (Hungarian: Adorján; died after 1201) was a Hungarian prelate at the turn of the 12th and 13th centuries, who served as bishop of Transylvania at least from 1192 to 1201. Prior to that, he had preeminent role in the establishment of a permanent royal chancellery in the Kingdom of Hungary.

== Chancellor ==
Adrian was born into a wealthy noble family, but his origin is unknown. He was styled as grand provost of Esztergom in 1183. Thereafter, Adrian studied at the Abbey of St Genevieve in Paris, alongside other Hungarian clergymen Job, Michael and Bethlehem, from around 1183 to 1184. In the latter year, the abbot Stephen of Tournai wrote a letter to Béla III of Hungary to inform him that one of those clerics, Bethlehem, died of illness, while his three companions, including Adrian were present on his deathbed. Historian György Györffy argued Adrian was one of the high-born clerics, who were sent by Béla III to France to benefit from higher education.

By 1185, Job and Adrian returned to the Kingdom of Hungary. While the former was elected Archbishop of Esztergom, Adrian was referred to as a royal notary in 1185. Still in that year, he was appointed chancellor of the royal court. He held the office at least until 1186. Beside that, he functioned as provost of Buda. Adrian is first mentioned as royal chancellor, when the monarch donated lands to the family of his daughter Margaret's nanny and Adrian was responsible to compile the letter of donation. Job and Adrian were jointly sent to the Kingdom of France as envoys of Béla III, in order to find a bride for the king (whose wife Agnes had died in the year 1184). They negotiated with King Philip II concerning the issue. Finally, Béla married Henry II's widowed daughter-in-law, Margaret of France, in the summer of 1186. Under Adrian then Katapán, renewing the temporary reforms of Kalán Bár-Kalán, the final form of royal diplomas and a royal chancellery independent of the royal chapel (capella) were established. These reforms showed a strong French literary and cultural influence, replacing the previous Byzantine-style.

== Bishop of Transylvania ==
Adrian was replaced as royal chancellor in 1188 at the latest, when Saul Győr is mentioned in this capacity. By 1192, Adrian was elected bishop of Transylvania. According to a non-authentic charter, he held the dignity already in 1190. His last known predecessor in that office is Paul, who is referred to as bishop in 1181. It is possible that Adrian became Bishop of Transylvania in 1187 or 1188, when Paul elevated into the position of Archbishop of Kalocsa.

Adrian was the bishop during that time, when the diocese was first called as "Transylvanus", which name was preserved for centuries. His episcopal activity was completely covered by a jurisdictional conflict with the newly founded the collegiate chapter of Szeben (present-day Sibiu, Romania). The "free" provostry was established by Béla III in 1189 with the intention to grant a separate church representation to the Transylvanian Saxons, who gradually settled down in the southern part of Transylvania since the reign of Géza II. Papal legate Gregorius de Sancto Apostolo, and later the Roman Curia confirmed the foundation too in 1191. However, Adrian contested the jurisdiction of a certain "P.", the provost of Szeben over the territory of his diocese, who claimed that all South-Transylvanian Germans (Flandrenses) were subordinated under his suzerainty. Upon the instruction of Pope Celestine III, Gregorius recalled that when he asked Béla, who resided in Veszprém with his barons then, responded that when he founded the provostry of Szeben, he had no intention of subordinating all Transylvanian Germans under the collegiate chapter, only those who were settled in the uninhabited wilderness given by his predecessor Géza II – that is, in the region of Altland (in the valley of the river Olt or Alt). Sometime between 1191 and 1196, papal legate Gregorius clarified the content of the establishment and jurisdiction according to the interpretation described above. Despite the resolution, the conflict between the diocese and the collegiate chapter continued in the subsequent years. Upon the request of Adrian, the newly crowned Pope Innocent III confirmed Gregorius' charter in 1198. In the next year, the pope permitted Adrian that if the archbishop of Esztergom, the provost of Szeben or the German clerics commit a violation of rights against him, or there is a suspicion of this, he can summon them to the Apostolic See, since the right of collection of tithe and parochial rights related to the Germans belongs to him in the area of the bishop's jurisdiction. Innocent's letter reveals that Job, Archbishop of Esztergom also tried to curtail the jurisdiction of the bishopric over German-inhabited areas.

Simultaneously, Adrian also had a harsh and violent conflict with the Kolozsmonostor Abbey, disputing the Benedictines' privileges and exemptions. According to a bull of Pope Honorius III from June 1222, Adrian once attacked the abbey with his soldiers, destroying its buildings, confiscating its privilege letters and capturing the abbot. His successor William followed the same method against the Kolozsmonostor Abbey years later. Adrian is last mentioned as a living person in 1201. A non-authentic charter refers to him as the incumbent bishop in 1202. He died by 1204, when William succeeded him.

== Identification theory ==
Hungarian folklorist Gyula Sebestyén identified Adrian with the chronicler Anonymus, author of the Gesta Hungarorum. According to Sebestyén, the author uses the French transliteration of antique names in many cases in his work, while his remark "now ... the Romans graze on the goods of Hungary" refers to his conflict with the collegiate chapter of Szeben.

== Sources ==
- C. Tóth, Norbert (2019). Az esztergomi székes- és társaskáptalanok archontológiája 1100–1543 [Archontology of the Cathedral and Collegiate Chapters of Esztergom, 1100–1543] (in Hungarian). Magyar Tudományos Akadémia Magyar Medievisztikai Kutatócsoportja. ISBN 978-963-508-913-0.
- Haraszti Szabó, Péter; Kelényi, Borbála (2019). Magyarországi diákok francia, angol, itáliai és német egyetemeken a középkorban, 1100–1526 [Students from Hungary at the Universities of France, England, Italy and Germany in the Middle Ages 1100–1526] (in Hungarian). ELTE Egyetemi Könyvtár és Levéltár; MTA ELTE Egyetemtörténeti Kutatócsoport. ISBN 978-963-489-098-0.
- Kaba, Ákos (1994). "Az őskrónika és Anonymus koratörténete [The Primary Chronicle and the Early History of Anonymus]". Életünk (in Hungarian). 32 (3–4). Vas Megye Önkormányzata: 352–362. ISSN 0133-4751.
- Kiss, Gergely (2013). Királyi egyházak a középkori Magyarországon [Royal Churches in Medieval Hungary] (in Hungarian). Pécsi Történettudományért Kulturális Egyesület. ISBN 978-963-642-442-8.
- Kubinyi, András (1975). "Királyi kancellária és udvari kápolna Magyarországon a XII. század közepén [Royal Chancery and Court Chapel in Hungary in the Middle of the 12th Century]". Levéltári Közlemények (in Hungarian). 46 (1). National Archives of Hungary: 59–121. ISSN 0024-1512.
- Markó, László (2006). A magyar állam főméltóságai Szent Istvántól napjainkig: Életrajzi Lexikon [Great Officers of State in Hungary from King Saint Stephen to Our Days: A Biographical Encyclopedia] (in Hungarian). Helikon Kiadó. ISBN 963-208-970-7.
- Temesváry, János (1922). Erdély középkori püspökei [Medieval Bishops of Transylvania] (in Hungarian). Minerva Irodalmi és Nyomdai Műintézet.
- Zsoldos, Attila (2011). Magyarország világi archontológiája, 1000–1301 [Secular Archontology of Hungary, 1000–1301] (in Hungarian). História, MTA Történettudományi Intézete. ISBN 978-963-9627-38-3.

Political offices
Preceded by Kalán Bár-Kalán	Chancellor; 1185–1186	Succeeded by Saul Győr
Catholic Church titles
Preceded by Paul	Bishop of Transylvania; 1192–1201	Succeeded by William
