= Unio Trium Nationum =

1437 Transylvanian mutual aid pact

Unio Trium Nationum (Latin for "Union of the Three Nations") was a pact of mutual aid codified in 1437 by three Estates of Transylvania: the (largely Hungarian) nobility, the Saxon (German) patrician class (represented by the Transylvanian Saxon University), and the free military Székelys. The union was directed against the whole of the peasantry, regardless of ethnicity, in response to the Transylvanian peasant revolt.

In this typical feudal estate parliament, the peasants (whether Hungarian, Saxon, Székely, or Romanian in origin) were not represented, and they did not benefit from its acts, as the commoners were not considered to be members of these feudal "nations".

== Background ==
=== Medieval administrative structure in Transylvania ===
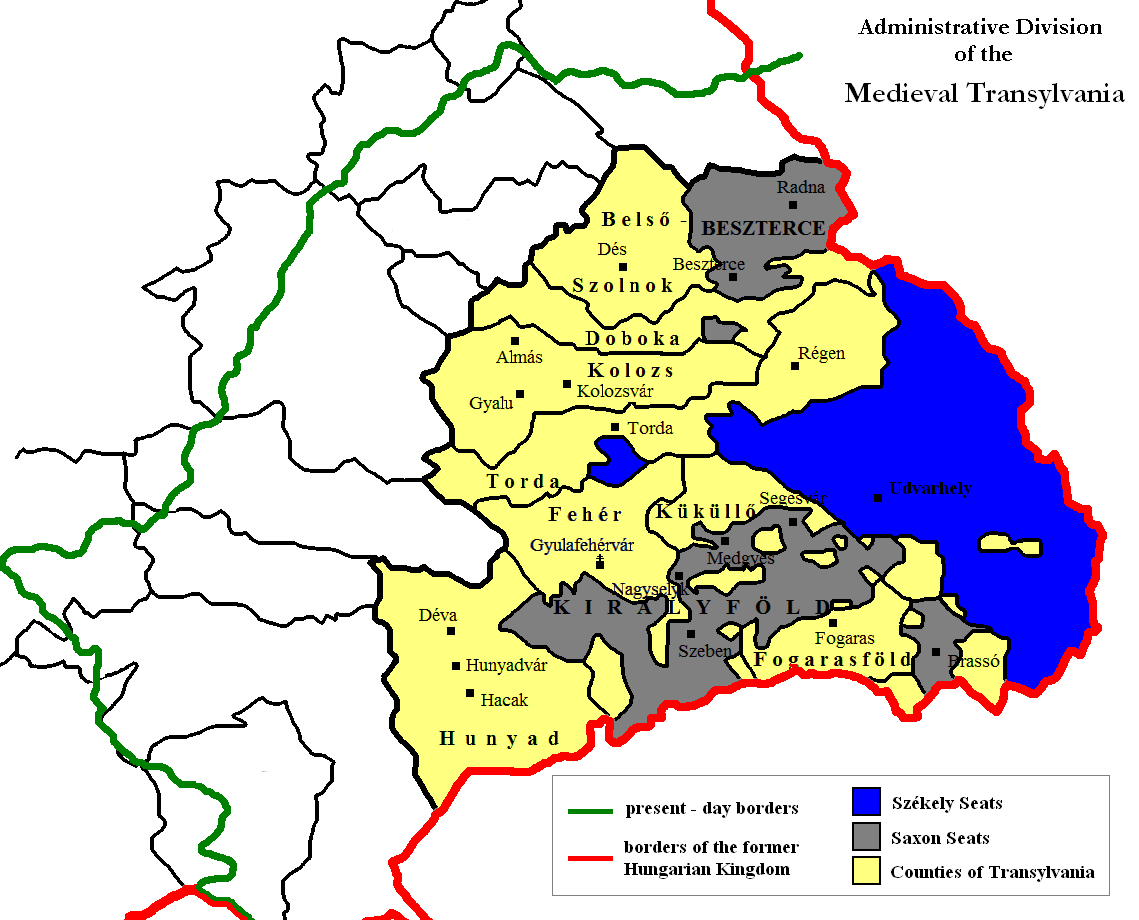
Territories of the Three Nations

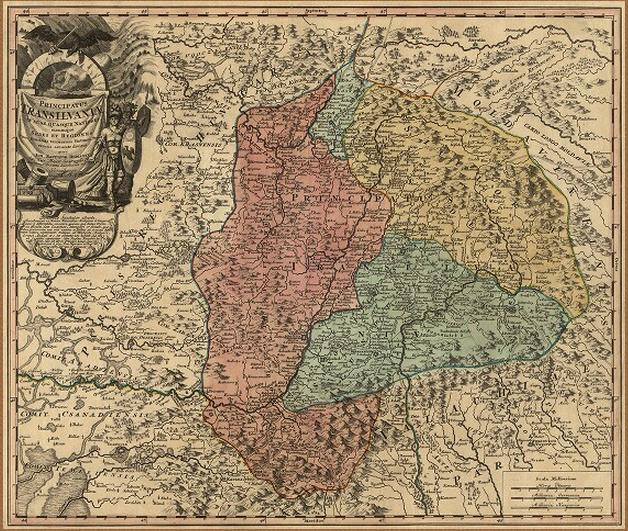
The territories of the Three Nations represented on a map made by Johann Homann in the first decades of the 18th century

In medieval times, Transylvania was organised into two separate types of territorial units: the Noble Counties (Comitates) were ruled by feudal landlords. Here, the majority of population were Hungarian and Romanian serfs. In other regions called Seats, the free Székely and Saxon nations lived without feudal landlords and had the royal privilege to have local authority and self-government.

=== Events leading to the Union ===
With the rise of the Ottoman Empire, one of the first major Ottoman military campaigns against Transylvanian parts of the Kingdom of Hungary was organised in 1421. The invading forces entered the region from Wallachia. The Saxons and Székelys living in the border area tried to defend themselves, but were heavily outnumbered by the intruders. King Sigismund was not able to react promptly because he had recently inherited the Bohemian throne and was involved there in the Hussite Wars. Also, Transylvanian Diets had not been organized for decades and there was no forum to coordinate defence preparations of the three nations. Left alone, the Saxon Burzenland and the Székely Seat of Háromszék, both in the border region, were ravaged. Sigismund reacted to the attack only years later, leading a series of military campaigns against the Ottomans in Wallachia. The Ottomans, allied with the Wallachian Voivode, returned in 1432 and Southern Transylvania suffered serious damages again.

In the same period, nobles and church authorities in Central Transylvania were concerned about protesting and revolting serfs. Hungarian and Romanian (Vlach) peasants were dissatisfied with high taxes and restrictions to their free movement. Scattered peasant protests turned into a serious revolt in 1437, when peasants and Hungarian nobles defeated the troops of the landholders. The Budai Nagy Antal Revolt was triggered by an attempt by the Bishop of Transylvania to collect taxes. Although the revolt was led by Hungarian noble Antal Nagy de Buda, it consisted of a coalition of various elements of Transylvanian society. This included Hungarian and Romanian serfs as well as the burghers of Kolozsvár (Klausenburg, Cluj), and resulted in the lower taxes codified by the Treaty of Kolozsmonostor. Pál Vajdaházi, one of the leaders of the revolt, was referred to in this document as vexilifer Universitatis regnicolarum Hungarorum et Valachorum huius principatus Hungariae (Standard-bearer of the Union of Hungarian and Romanian inhabitants of this province of Hungary). Consequently, it is possible that the rebels considered themselves inhabitants of the Estate of Hungarians and Romanians (Universitas Hungarorum et Valachorum).

=== Brotherly Union (Union of Kápolna) ===
Despite the pressing issues at hand, the Transylvanian Diet was still not called together by the Voivode, resulting in the various nobles initiating a meeting of the three nations. After a gap of almost half a century, the estates now had the opportunity to discuss Transylvanian issues together. On this occasion, the nobles set up an alliance with Székelys and Saxons who were still afraid of possible Ottoman incursions. The alliance of mutual aid, signed in Kápolna (present-day (Căpâlna), was called the Fraterna Unio (Brotherly Union), and was designed to protect the parties both from revolts and Ottoman attacks. While the existence of the Union helped the indigenous inhabitants to re-negotiate and partly modify the terms of the previous agreement, the alliance did not organize any serious military operations until the end of 1437. At that time, the alliance defeated the opposition after the death of King Sigismund in December.

== Founding of the Union of Three Nations ==
After the successful campaign, the alliance of Hungarian nobles, Székelys, and Saxon elite was codified in the Unio Trium Nationum ("Union of Three Nations") on February 2, 1438. Like the Brotherly Union, the new Union provided mutual aid against peasant revolts and Ottoman attacks. The Union ensured that the (Hungarian and Romanian) serfs continued to be excluded from the political life of Transylvania, although they were the majority of the population in the Noble Counties (Comitates). The Romanians adhered to Eastern Orthodoxy, which in predominantly Catholic Hungary was considered heretical.

The alliance of the three privileged estates was effective for centuries and provided the framework of internal and international relations of Transylvania. After the 18th century, when the danger of Ottoman or Tatar attacks was over, the Union became an alliance of the three estates to protect their vested rights from those who were not represented in the Transylvanian Diet. In the 19th century, the term "three nations" became charged with ethnic considerations, because Romanians were consequently excluded from Transylvanian government.

In 1711, the Bulgarians of Alvinc and Déva (led by church leader Balázs Marinovics) and the Armenians also claimed the privileges of a fourth and fifth natio, but their demands were not met with the elevation of their communities to that privileged status.

== See also ==
- Supplex Libellus Valachorum
- Universitas Valachorum
