= Goblinus =

Transylvanian Catholic bishop (died 1386)

Goblinus (or Goblin) was the bishop of Transylvania in the Kingdom of Hungary from 1376 until his death in 1386.

A native of Nagycsűr (Șura Mare), Goblinus was a Transylvanian Saxon. His father was Adalbert. In 1349, he was the parish priest of Sellenberk (Șelimbăr). Later he served as the parish of Kereszténysziget (Cristian). In a papal bull dated 5 May 1376, Pope Gregory XI appointed him bishop of Transylvania while praising his learning and spirituality.

As bishop, Goblinus served as an advisor to King Louis the Great. The charter of November 1376 renewing the statutes of the nineteen guilds of Nagyszeben (Sibiu), Segesvár (Sighișoara), Szászsebes (Sebeș) and Szászváros (Orăștie) was drafted by the bishop and the royal bailiff, Johann von Scharfeneck. Goblinus engineered the signing of a peace convention between the Saxons of Nagyszeben and the local Vlachs at Kereszténysziget on 9 January 1383. In 1383, Queen Mary bestowed on Goblinus, his three brothers and three sisters a crown estate comprising the Saxon village of Omlás (Amnaș) and four Vlach villages in the mountains. In 1384, Goblinus founded a Pauline monastery in the village of Tótfalud (Tăuți).

In his will, Goblinus left a breviary to the cathedral rectory. His tombstone survives, but is heavily damaged.
