= Paul II (archbishop of Kalocsa) =

Hungarian bishop

Paul
- Archbishop-elect of Kalocsa
- Installed: 1186/88
- Term ended: 1188/90
- Predecessor: Andrew
- Successor: Peter
- Other post: Bishop of Transylvania

Personal details
- Died: after 1188
- Denomination: Roman Catholic

Paul (Hungarian: Pál; died after 1188) was a Hungarian prelate in the twelfth century, who served as Bishop of Transylvania, then Archbishop-elect of Kalocsa in the 1180s.

== Career ==
Paul first appears in contemporary records around 1177, when he functioned as provost of the collegiate chapter of Fehérvár and royal notary. In this capacity, he formulated the last will and testament of one Kaba in favor of the Pannonhalma Abbey upon the order of King Béla III, who issued the charter on a Sunday, while sitting under an oak tree at the palace of comes Scene in Esztergom. This document is the last royal sealed diploma, which was issued on behalf of a private individual. In 1178, Paul was styled as royal chancellor. He formulated that royal privilege, in which Béla III ennobled three royal servants, the ancestors of the Salamon de Milej noble family and donated the village of Milej in Zala County to them. However this royal charter later proved to be a non-authentic forgery.

He elevated into the position of Bishop of Transylvania by 1181. Simultaneously, Paul was succeeded as "chancellor" possibly by notary Vaska. Despite that, due to his high literacy, Paul remained occasionally in his former role. He formulated that famous document in that year, in which Béla III emphasized the importance of written records, ordering that a charter was to be issued for all transactions proceeding in his presence. This decision resulted the establishment of the permanent Royal Chancery and the proliferation of governmental literacy, independently of the ecclesiastical institutions. According to historian László Fejérpataky, Paul acted as an ad hoc chancellor in this case. The royal document itself was a royal approval of that possession contract, during which Froa, widow of the late provost Marcellus sold the land of Szőllős to Farkas Gatal, Palatine of Hungary. There is no record of any further ecclesiastical activity of Paul in Transylvania.

Sometime after the death of the forceful Archbishop Andrew of Kalocsa in 1186, Paul was elected as his successor. He was still styled as Archbishop-elect of Kalocsa on 6 May 1188, when Béla III transcribed and confirmed his late brother, Stephen III's donations to the monastery of St. John in Biograd. A non-authentic charter from 1175 already refers to him as Archbishop of Kalocsa. Historian Attila Zsoldos analyzed the document in detail and revealed the contradictions between archontological data, which still exist despite that historiographical efforts which tried to correct the charter's date to 1183 or 1185. Paul again appears in a forgery, allegedly issued in 1188, but its list of dignitaries is reliable. Paul was succeeded as archbishop by Peter in 1192 at the latest. According to a non-authentic charter, he already held the dignity in 1190. As Peter's namesake successor in the Archdiocese of Split already appears in 1191, it implies that he was transferred to the Archbishopric of Kalocsa prior to that, presumably in 1190, which suggests that Paul died in that year.

== Identification theory ==
Academic Kornél Szovák considered Paul was identical with the chronicler Anonymus, author of the Gesta Hungarorum, referring to a rare pair of object, which appears in both Paul's charter from 1177 and the chronicle ("potenter et pacifice" and "pacifice et feliciter"). Other scholars rejected this theory because Paul's death occurred still during the reign of Béla III and the chronicler referred to the monarch as a deceased person. Reflecting on that, Szovák argued there is no certainty on his death, Paul could retire from public life and entered a monastic order after his resignation from the archbishopric. However, an 11th-century document already used the phrase "episcopis feliciter et coronatus" regarding Béla I, as Gábor Vékony analyzed, and the spelling of the Hungarian words of the Gesta Hungarorum is different from the spelling of Paul's diplomas, as Szovák already noticed.

== Sources ==
- Kubinyi, András (1975). "Királyi kancellária és udvari kápolna Magyarországon a XII. század közepén [Royal Chancery and Court Chapel in Hungary in the Middle of the 12th Century]". Levéltári Közlemények (in Hungarian). 46 (1). National Archives of Hungary: 59–121. ISSN 0024-1512.
- Szovák, Kornél (1991). ""Wer war der anonyme Notar?" Zur Bestimmung des Verfassers der Gesta Ungarorum ["Who was the Anonymous Notary?" To Designate the Author of Gesta Hungarorum]". Ungarn-Jahrbuch (in German). 19. Verlag Ungarisches Institut: 1–16. ISSN 0082-755X.
- Temesváry, János (1922). Erdély középkori püspökei [Medieval Bishops of Transylvania] (in Hungarian). Minerva Irodalmi és Nyomdai Műintézet.
- Udvardy, József (1991). A kalocsai érsekek életrajza (1000–1526) [Biographies of Archbishops of Kalocsa, 1000–1526] (in Hungarian). Görres Gesellschaft.
- Zsoldos, Attila (2011). Magyarország világi archontológiája, 1000–1301 [Secular Archontology of Hungary, 1000–1301] (in Hungarian). História, MTA Történettudományi Intézete. ISBN 978-963-9627-38-3.

Catholic Church titles
Preceded by Vilcina	Bishop of Transylvania c. 1181	Succeeded by Adrian
Preceded by Andrew	Archbishop of Kalocsa elected c. 1188	Succeeded by Peter
