= Antal Nagy de Buda =

Hungarian noble (died 1437)

Antal Nagy de Buda or Antal Budai Nagy (died near Kolozsvár, Kingdom of Hungary (today Cluj-Napoca, Romania), December 10–14, 1437) was a petty nobleman from Kolozs County, Transylvania, who led the first major peasant revolt in medieval Hungary in 1437. He died in the decisive battle during the revolt, which subsequently failed.

Because of his name, his family might have originated from Nagybuda, Transylvania. He lived in the neighbouring village of Diós.

== The peasant uprising ==
Antal Nagy de Buda lived in Diós, Kolozs County. His family got its name from the village of Nagybuda (today part of Chinteni, Cluj County) in Transylvania. As a soldier, he took part in the Hussite wars in the Czech Republic, where he first became acquainted with Hussitism and a new kind of fighting style.

In Transylvania, the peasants were increasingly taxed by the nobility in the 1430s. King Sigismund's spoilage of money (enforces by law the people to change the coins and made new one with less silver proportion) in particular provoked great uproar and hostility. Bishop György Lépes, moreover, excommunicated the serfs from the church if they refused to pay him decima. Due to the brutal oppression of the nobles, lot of serfs became a follower of Jan Hus(Hussites) in Transylvania.

The peasants gathered on Bábolna Hill were joined by Antal Nagy, along with many other little nobles who were also not satisfied. Antal Nagy was then elected leader by the insurgents because he had military experience. The Transylvanian peasant war started.

After the peasants' envoys were killed by László Csáki's Transylvanian voivode, Antal Nagy gathered the Hungarian and Romanian peasant armies (and some regular nobles). Having experience of the Hussite style of fighting, he arranged the insurgents in a chariot castle, and at Dés he attacked and defeated the knightly army of the nobles who had marched against them. The nobles were forced to negotiate with the insurgents and their leader. The first treaty of Kolozsmonostor was broken by the nobles as soon as another armed force was gathered. At Apáti the peasants prevailed again, and Antal Budai Nagy marched to Kolozsvár. However, despite the victory, the second treaty of the Kolozsmonostor convention was followed by further clashes by the end of the autumn. There were lot of peasant missed from Antal Nagy's army due to losses and departures. Their main strength, against the Transylvanian army marching against Kolozsvár, gathered the peasant army for another attack. They continued to fight resolutely, but in the end the peasant leader fell. The uprising soon failed, but until the recapture of Kolozsvár by the nobility's army on January 8, there were still peasant uprising in Northern Transylvania and Tiszántúl.

== Sources ==
- https://archive.org/details/prefatiomagistri00thur/page/n241/mode/2up
- Demény, Lajos (1987). Parasztfelkelés Erdélyben 1437-1438. Gondolat. ISBN 9632818563.
