= György Lépes =

Roman Catholic bishop (1375–1442)

György Lépes (1375 – 18 March 1442, Marosszentimre) was a Transylvanian Catholic Bishop.

== Life ==
Lépes was born in what is now Arad County to a noble family. He was the provost of Transylvania between 1403 and 1417, and was bishop from 1427 to 1442. In 1436, he invited James of the Marches as an inquisitor against the spread of the Hussite movement. In 1437, the Budai Nagy Antal revolt broke out because of Lépes' regulations that ordered the serfs to pay the tithe in the new currency of golden coins 3 years after the peasants had silver coins (worth four times more), and also wanted to order the Orthodox Romanians to pay it. The 1438 uprising was brutally crushed by the nobles, and the three estate nations (Hungarian, Székely, and Saxon) concluded with the Union of Kápolna. In 1442, Lépes, while leading the fighting against the Turks at the battle of Hermannstadt, was killed.
