= Baranus =

Hungarian bishop

- Bishop of Transylvania
- Installed: 1134/1139
- Term ended: after 1139
- Predecessor: Peter
- Successor: Walter

Personal details
- Died: after 1139
- Denomination: Roman Catholic

Baranus was a Hungarian prelate in the 12th century, who served as Bishop of Transylvania around 1139, during the reign of Béla II of Hungary.

Baranus was elected bishop sometime after 1134, when his predecessor Peter is mentioned. The name of Baranus appears only in the clause of a document related to the Bozók Abbey (present-day Bzovík, Slovakia) in 1139. His closest known successor Walter is first styled as Bishop of Transylvania only in 1156.

== Sources ==
- Temesváry, János (1922). Erdély középkori püspökei [Medieval Bishops of Transylvania] (in Hungarian). Minerva Irodalmi és Nyomdai Műintézet.
- Zsoldos, Attila (2011). Magyarország világi archontológiája, 1000–1301 [Secular Archontology of Hungary, 1000–1301] (in Hungarian). História, MTA Történettudományi Intézete. ISBN 978-963-9627-38-3.

Catholic Church titles
Preceded by Peter	Bishop of Transylvania fl. 1139	Succeeded by Walter
