= Franco (bishop) =

Hungarian bishop

Franco (Hungarian: Frank) was a Hungarian prelate in the 11th century, who was a councilor of Solomon, King of Hungary in the early 1070s. Which bishopric he administered is uncertain.

== Sources ==
But when they divided the treasure, the king [Solomon], on the counsel of Vid and Bishop Frank and Radoan, the son of Bugar, and Ilia, a kinsman of Vid; divided the treasure into four parts and gave one quarter to the duke who was to have received a third, and of the three remaining parts he gave one to be shared among all the soldiers, the second to Vid, and the third to Ilia. At this the duke [Géza] was greatly annoyed.

— Illuminated Chronicle

According to the 14th-century Illuminated Chronicle, Franco served as a bishop of one of the dioceses of the Kingdom of Hungary and was considered a loyal confidant and councilor of King Solomon by 1071. In this capacity, he took part in the Byzantine–Hungarian War in that year. He was present at the successful siege of Belgrade. The chronicle narrates that Franco (Frank) – alongside other lords, Vid Gutkeled, Rodowan and Ilia, Vid's relative – advised Solomon to leave Duke Géza out of dividing the spoils of war, which caused the confrontation between them to deepen. The Illuminated Chronicle does not mention Franco's episcopal see. Despite his political affiliation, Franco remained in his position after Géza I ascended the Hungarian throne following his victorious battle against Solomon. Franco assisted the foundation of the Garamszentbenedek Abbey (present-day Hronský Beňadik, Slovakia) in 1075. His name appears in Géza's establishing charter, alongside archbishops Nehemiah of Esztergom, Desiderius of Kalocsa and suffragans Aaron, Gecticus and Lazarus. The document does not name Franco's episcopal see either.

== Identification ==
Two foreign sources, the Chronicon Sancti Huberti Andaginensis and the Vita Theoderici Abbatis Andaginensis, both from Liège refer to a certain "Franco Bellagradensis pontifex" and "Franco episcopus Bellagradensis", respectively, under the year 1081. Based on this, Croatian historian Franjo Rački considered that Franco functioned as a bishop of Biograd (in Dalmatia). Historian Gyula Pauler identified "Bellagradensis" with Gyulafehérvár (present-day Alba Iulia, Romania), accordingly Franco could have been a bishop of Transylvania. His theory was accepted by György Györffy and Gyula Kristó too. In contrast, Péter Váczy identified Franco's (titular) episcopal see with Belgrade (today Serbia's capital), where a Greek-ryte metropolitanate located at the turn of the 11–12th centuries. There is another source, the death register (obitury) of the Saint Lambert's Cathedral, also in Liège, which commemorates a certain deceased Franco, the bishop of Veszprém ("commemoratio Franconis episcopi apud Vesperem que est civitas Hungariae"), who died in 1081. Gábor Thoroczkay accepted this data, arguing that Székesfehérvár, or "Alba Regia", located in the diocese too, where the suffragan also possessed a palace. Tibor Szőcs considered the identification of "Bellagradensis" with Biograd, where a diocese existed from 1059 to 1125 until the city was conquered and demolished by the Republic of Venice. Pál Engel and László Koszta also considered that Franco was perhaps a bishop of Veszprém sometime around 1071–1081.

György Székely argued Franco was of Walloon origin. Based on the aforementioned death register, he considered that he served as bishop of Veszprém. Székely identified his person with the Polish prelate Franko ("episcopus Poloniensis"), who was a councilor of Władysław I Herman in the 1080s, according to the Gesta principum Polonorum. Székely identified "Bellagradensis" with Belgard, Pomerania (today Białogard, Poland), where he functioned as a missionary bishop (thus this Walloon-born prelate moved from Hungary to Poland sometime in the late 1070s). He visited the Abbey of Saint-Hubert in this capacity in 1081 during the consecration of the new altar dedicated to Saint Giles, in the companion of Henry of Verdun, the bishop of Liège. Later, Franco also visited the Abbey of Saint-Gilles in 1084. Upon his plausible invitation, Benedictines from Liège settled in Lubin.

Elemér Mályusz rejected Székely's reconstruction, because there is no source that Białogard was ever an episcopal seat. Dániel Bagi argued there is no identification with the Polish prelate Franko, who was bishop of Poznań, according to the Polish historiography (e.g. Władysław Abraham and Roman Grodecki). Bagi argued the sources from Liège refer to the Polish prelate only. In addition, Białogard was conquered by only Bolesław III Wrymouth in 1107. Judit Csákó, however, did not reject identification with the Polish prelate.

== Sources ==
=== Primary sources ===
- Bak, János M.; Veszprémy, László; Kersken, Norbert (2018). Chronica de gestis Hungarorum e codice picto saec. XIV [The Illuminated Chronicle: Chronicle of the deeds of the Hungarians from the fourteenth-century illuminated codex]. Budapest: Central European University Press. ISBN 978-9-6338-6264-3.

=== Secondary studies ===
- Bagi, Dániel (2005). "Szent László és Szent István Gallus Anonymus gestájában. Megjegyzések a III. könyv 25. fejezetéhez [Saint Ladislaus and Saint Stephen in the Gesta of Gallus Anonymus. Remarks to the 25th Chapter of Book III]". Századok (in Hungarian). 139 (2). Magyar Történelmi Társulat: 291–334. ISSN 0039-8098.
- Csákó, Judit (2023). Az Árpád-kori Magyarország francia tükörben [Arpadian Hungary in French Mirror] (in Hungarian). Arpadiana XIV., HUN–REN Research Centre for the Humanities. ISBN 978-963-416-368-8.
- Pauler, Gyula (1899). A magyar nemzet története az Árpád-házi királyok alatt, I. [The History of the Hungarian Nation during the Árpádian Kings, Vol. 1.] (in Hungarian). Athenaeum.
- Székely, György (1972). "A székesfehérvári latinok és vallonok a középkori Magyarországon" [The Latins and Walloons of Székesfehérvár in Medieval Hungary]. In Kralovánszky, Alán (ed.). Székesfehérvár évszázadai. 2. Középkor [Centuries of Székesfehérvár, Volume II: Middle Ages] (in Hungarian). Székesfehérvár: Szent István Király Múzeum. pp. 45–72.
- Szőcs, Tibor (2007). "A 14. századi krónikaszerkesztmény interpolációi és 11. századi okleveleink [Interpolations of the 14th-Century Chronicle Compilation and the 11th-Century Charters]". Fons. 14 (1). Szentpétery Imre Történettudományi Alapítvány: 59–96. ISSN 1217-8020.
- Tóth, Péter (2007). "Vallon főpapok a magyar egyház újjászervezésében a pogánylázadás után" [Walloon Prelates in the Reorganization of the Hungarian Church after the Pagan Rebellion]. In Érszegi, Géza (ed.). Tanulmányok a 950 éves Tihanyi alapítólevél tiszteletére [Studies in Honor of the 950-year-old Founding Charter of Tihany] (in Hungarian). Tihany: Benedictine Abbey of Tihany. pp. 31–36. ISBN 9789638700445.
