= Peter (bishop of Transylvania, fl. 1134) =

Hungarian bishop

- Bishop of Transylvania
- Installed: before 1134
- Term ended: 1134/1139
- Predecessor: Simon (?)
- Successor: Baranus

Personal details
- Died: after 1134
- Denomination: Roman Catholic

Peter (Hungarian: Péter) was a Hungarian prelate in the 12th century, who served as Bishop of Transylvania around 1134, during the reign of Béla II of Hungary.

He is styled as "episcopus Albae civitatis" (i.e. present-day Alba Iulia, the episcopal see) by a single source in 1134. In that year, Béla II sent him to the court of Lothair III, Holy Roman Emperor in Altenburg, in order for the emperor to forbid his vassal, the Polish duke Bolesław III Wrymouth from fighting against Béla II and Soběslav I, Duke of Bohemia. Lothair III agreed to arbitrate the various dynastic disputes and sent Peter back to Hungary with abundant gifts. Peter held the dignity of Bishop of Transylvania until 1139 at the latest, when a certain Baranus is mentioned in this capacity.

== Sources ==
- Temesváry, János (1922). Erdély középkori püspökei [Medieval Bishops of Transylvania] (in Hungarian). Minerva Irodalmi és Nyomdai Műintézet.
- Zsoldos, Attila (2011). Magyarország világi archontológiája, 1000–1301 [Secular Archontology of Hungary, 1000–1301] (in Hungarian). História, MTA Történettudományi Intézete. ISBN 978-963-9627-38-3.

Catholic Church titles
Preceded by Simon (?)	Bishop of Transylvania fl. 1134	Succeeded by Baranus
