= Lajos Bálint =

Roman Catholic archbishop

- Archbishop of Alba Iulia
- Native name: Bálint Lajos
- Church: Catholic Church
- Archdiocese: Archdiocese of Alba Iulia
- In office: 14 March 1990 – 29 November 1993
- Predecessor: Antal Jakab
- Successor: György Jakubinyi
- Previous posts: Titular Bishop of Nova (1981-1990); Auxiliary Bishop of Alba Iulia (1981-1990)

Orders
- Ordination: 28 April 1957
- Consecration: 29 September 1981 by Antal Jakab

Personal details
- Born: 6 July 1929 Delnița, Păuleni-Ciuc, Ciuc County, Kingdom of Romania
- Died: 4 April 2010 (aged 80)

Lajos Bálint (6 July 1929 – 4 April 2010) was a Roman Catholic archbishop of the Roman Catholic Archdiocese of Alba Iulia, Romania.

Ordained to the priesthood on 28 April 1958, Bálint was named a bishop for the Alba Iulia archdiocese on 9 July 1981 and was ordained on 29 September 1981. He resigned on 29 November 1993.
