= Gergely Kovács (bishop) =

Hungarian archbishop

His Excellency Gergely Kovács
- Archbishop of Alba Iulia
- Church: Roman Catholic
- Archdiocese: Roman Catholic Archdiocese of Alba Iulia
- Appointed: 24 December 2019

Orders
- Ordination: 3 July 1993
- Consecration: 22 February 2020 by Gianfranco Ravasi

Personal details
- Born: 21 July 1968 (age 58) Târgu Secuiesc, Romania

Gergely Kovács (born July 21, 1968, Târgu Secuiesc, Romania) is the current archbishop of the Archdiocese of Alba Iulia.

== Biography ==
Gergely Kovács was born on July 21, 1968, in Târgu Secuiesc. Kovács studied at the Roman Catholic Theological Institute in Alba Iulia from 1987 until 1990. After the Romanian Revolution of 1989 his bishop sent him to study in Rome. Already in Rome, he stayed at the Pontifical German-Hungarian College (1990–1996), remaining at the Pontifical Gregorian University until 1992. He was ordained a priest in the Archdiocese of Alba Iulia on July 3, 1993, by Archbishop Lajos Bálint. Kovács continued his studies in Rome, where he obtained a degree in Canon Law at the Pontifical Lateran University in 1994 and a doctorate in 1996. He was a vicar priest in Târgu Mureș. Since 1997 he has been in the service of the Holy See, working in the Pontifical Council for Culture. Since 24 July 2000 he was awarded the title of Chaplain of His Holiness. Since 2007 he has been director of the Pontifical Council for Culture. During his time in Rome, Kovács also collaborated with the Congregation for the Clergy and the Rota Romana Tribunal, being also the postulator of the cause of beatification of Áron Márton.

Kovács was named by Pope Francis archbishop of Alba Iulia on December 24, 2019 and his episcopal ordination took place on February 22, 2020, in St. Michael's Cathedral in Alba Iulia by the hands of Cardinal Gianfranco Ravasi, chairman of the Pontifical Council for Culture. On September 2, 2020, Kovács was appointed Apostolic Administrator of Romania for Armenian Catholics.
