= Șura Mare =

- Commune
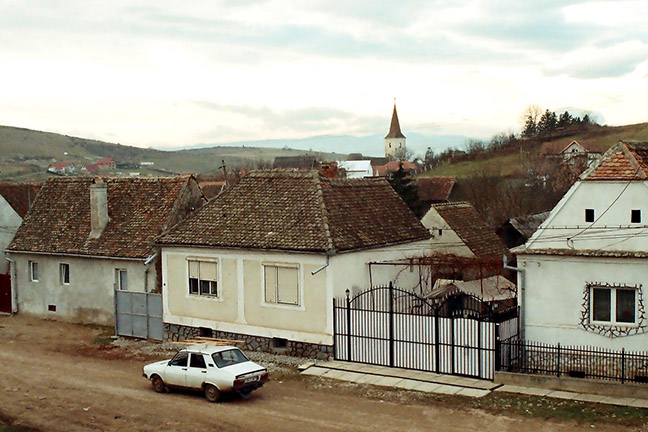
- View of Șura Mare

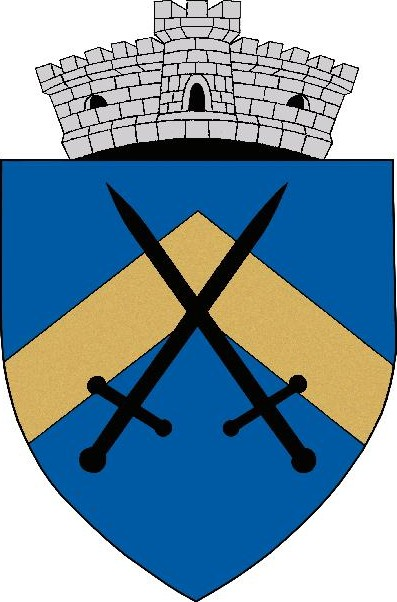
- Coat of arms

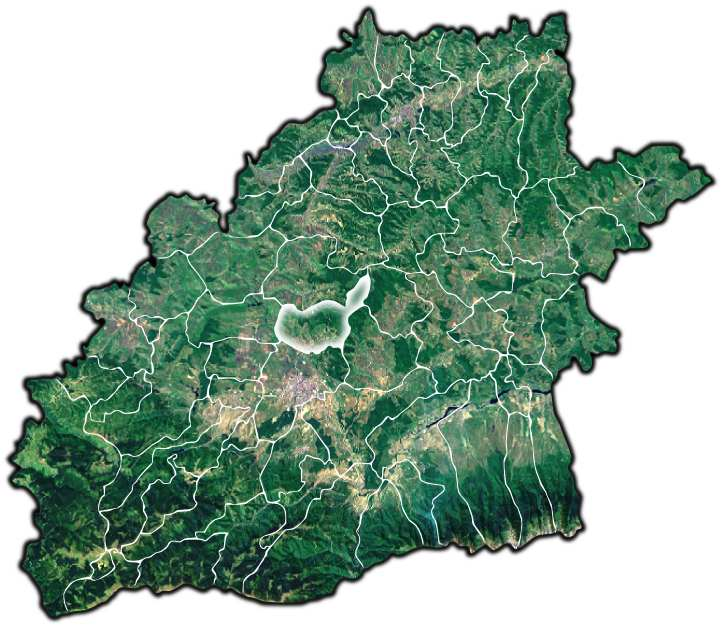
- Location in Sibiu County

- Location in Romania
- Coordinates: 45°51′N 24°10′E
- Country: Romania
- County: Sibiu

Government
  - Mayor (2024–2028): Ionuț Maier (PNL)
- Area: 74.85 km^{2} (28.90 sq mi)
- Elevation: 450 m (1,480 ft)
- Population (2021-12-01): 4,529
  - Density: 60.51/km^{2} (156.7/sq mi)
- Time zone: UTC+02:00 (EET)
  - Summer (DST): UTC+03:00 (EEST)
- Postal code: 557265
- Area code: (+40) 02 69
- Vehicle reg.: SB
- Website: primariasuramare.ro

Șura Mare (German: Großscheuern; Hungarian: Nagycsűr) is a commune located in Sibiu County, Transylvania, Romania. It is composed of two villages, Hamba (Hahnbach; Kakasfalva) and Șura Mare. Șura Mare was first mentioned in 1332, and Hamba in 1337.

The commune lies on the Transylvanian Plateau. It is situated in the central part of the county, just north of the county seat, Sibiu. The river Hamba flows through the commune.

At the 2011 census, Șura Mare had 3,769 inhabitants; of those, 87.53% were Romanians and 4.75% Roma. At the 2021 census, the commune had a population of 4,529, of which 85.34% were Romanians.

== Evangelical Lutheran Transylvanian Saxon medieval fortified churches ==
Both villages in Șura Mare have fortified churches. The church in Șura Mare is a three-apse basilica. It was built in the 13th century (the tower is from around 1300), and fortified in 1495, apparently as a response to Ottoman attacks in 1493.

The Romanesque basilica in Hamba was built in the 13th century, however, only fragments of the tower survived. The current building originates from the beginning of the 16th century.

== Gallery ==
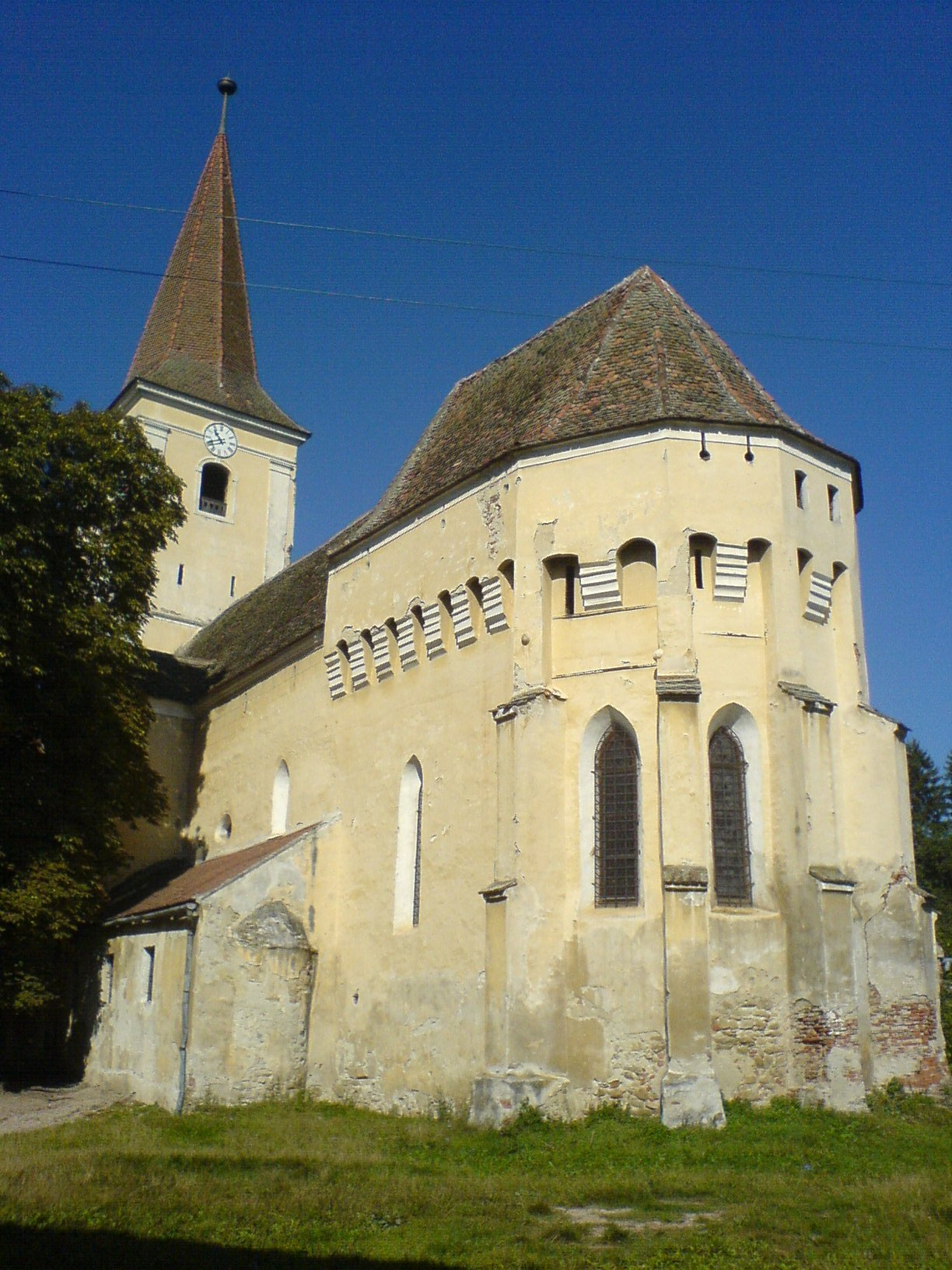
Evangelical Lutheran Transylvanian Saxon fortified church of Șura Mare

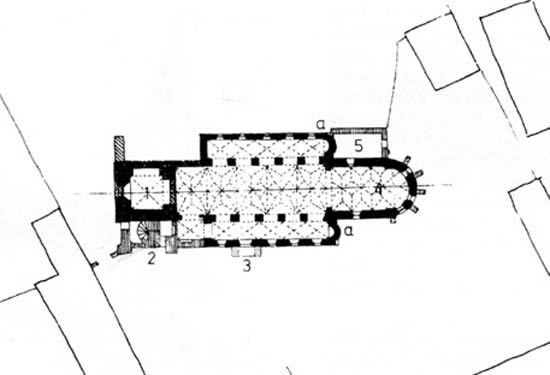
The plan of the Evangelical Lutheran Transylvanian Saxon fortified church of Șura Mare

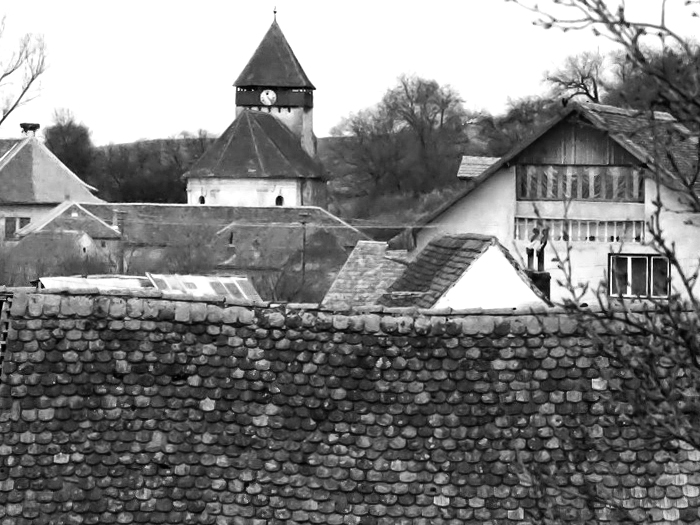
Evangelical Lutheran Transylvanian Saxon fortified church of Hamba

== Notable people ==
- Goblinus, Transylvanian Saxon bishop of Transylvania from 1376 until his death in 1386
