= Roman Catholic Archdiocese of Alba Iulia =

Catholic diocese in Romania

Coordinates: 46.0676°N 23.5700°E

Archdiocese of Alba Iulia Archidioecesis Albae Iuliensis Arhiepiscopia de Alba Iulia

Catholic

Location
- Country: Romania
- Metropolitan: Immediately Subject to the Holy See

Statistics
- Area: 58,254 km^{2} (22,492 sq mi)
- Population: Total; Catholics: (as of 2015); 4,017,256; 397,778 (9.9%)
- Parishes: 253

Information
- Sui iuris church: Latin Church
- Rite: Roman Rite
- Established: 1009 (As Diocese of Transilvania, Erdély, Siebenbürgen); 22 March 1932 (As Diocese of Alba Iulia); 5 August 1991 (Archdiocese of Alba Iulia)
- Cathedral: St. Michael's Cathedral, Alba Iulia

Current leadership
- Pope: Leo XIV
- Archbishop: Gergely Kovács
- Auxiliary Bishops: László Kerekes (elect)
- Bishops emeritus: György Jakubinyi; József Tamás

Map
- Administrative map of Roman-Catholic Church

The Roman Catholic Archdiocese of Alba Iulia (Latin: Archidioecesis Albae Iuliensis); Hungarian: Gyulafehérvári Római Katolikus Érsekség) is a Latin Church archdiocese in Transylvania, Romania.

== History ==
It was established as a bishopric, the diocese of Transylvania also called Erdély (in Hungarian), or Karlsburg alias Siebenbürgen (in German), in 1009 by King Stephen I of Hungary and was renamed as the diocese of Alba Iulia on 22 March 1932.

It was raised to the rank of an archdiocese by Pope John Paul II on 5 August 1991. It is exempt, i.e. directly subordinate to the Vatican, while the other Romanian dioceses form the Ecclesiastical Province of Bucharest.

== Bishops ==
=== Ordinaries ===
Bishops

- (?) Franco (1071–1081)
- Simon (1111–1113)
- Peter (1134)
- Baranus (1139)
- Walter (1156–1157/8)
- Vilcina (1166–1169)
- Paul (1181)
- Adrian (1192–1201)
- William (1204–1221)
- Raynald of Belleville (1222–1241)
- Artolf (1244–1245)
- Gallus (1246–1269)
- Peter Monoszló (1270–1307)
- Benedict (1309–1319)
- Demetrius (1368–1376)
- Goblinus (1376–1386)
- János Statileo (1534–1542)
- Pál Bornemissza (1553–1556)
- Demeter Naprágyi (1597–1605)
- József Batthyány (1759–1760)
- József Anton Bajtay (1760–1772)
- Piusz Manzador (1772–1774)
- László von Kollonich (1775–1780)
- Ignác Batthyány (1780–1798)
- Sándor Rudnay (1815–1819)
- Lajos Haynald (1852–1863)
- Áron Márton (1938–1980)
- Lajos Bálint (1990–1991)

Archbishops

- Lajos Bálint (1991–1993)
- György Jakubinyi (1994–2019)
- Gergely Kovács (since 2019)

=== Auxiliary Bishops ===
- György-Miklós Jakubinyi (1990–1994), appointed Archbishop here
- József Tamás (1996–2019)
- László Kerekes (since 2020)

== Description ==
The archdiocese covers Transylvania proper—the counties of Alba, Bistrița-Năsăud, Brașov, Cluj, Covasna, Harghita, Hunedoara, Mureș, Sălaj and Sibiu.

The cathedral episcopal see is St. Michael's, in Alba Iulia city. It also has a minor basilica in Șumuleu Ciuc.

== Population ==
11% of its inhabitants are Roman Catholic, with concentrations in parts of Harghita and Covasna counties. Catholic adherents are predominantly ethnic Hungarians.
