= Chinteni =

- Commune
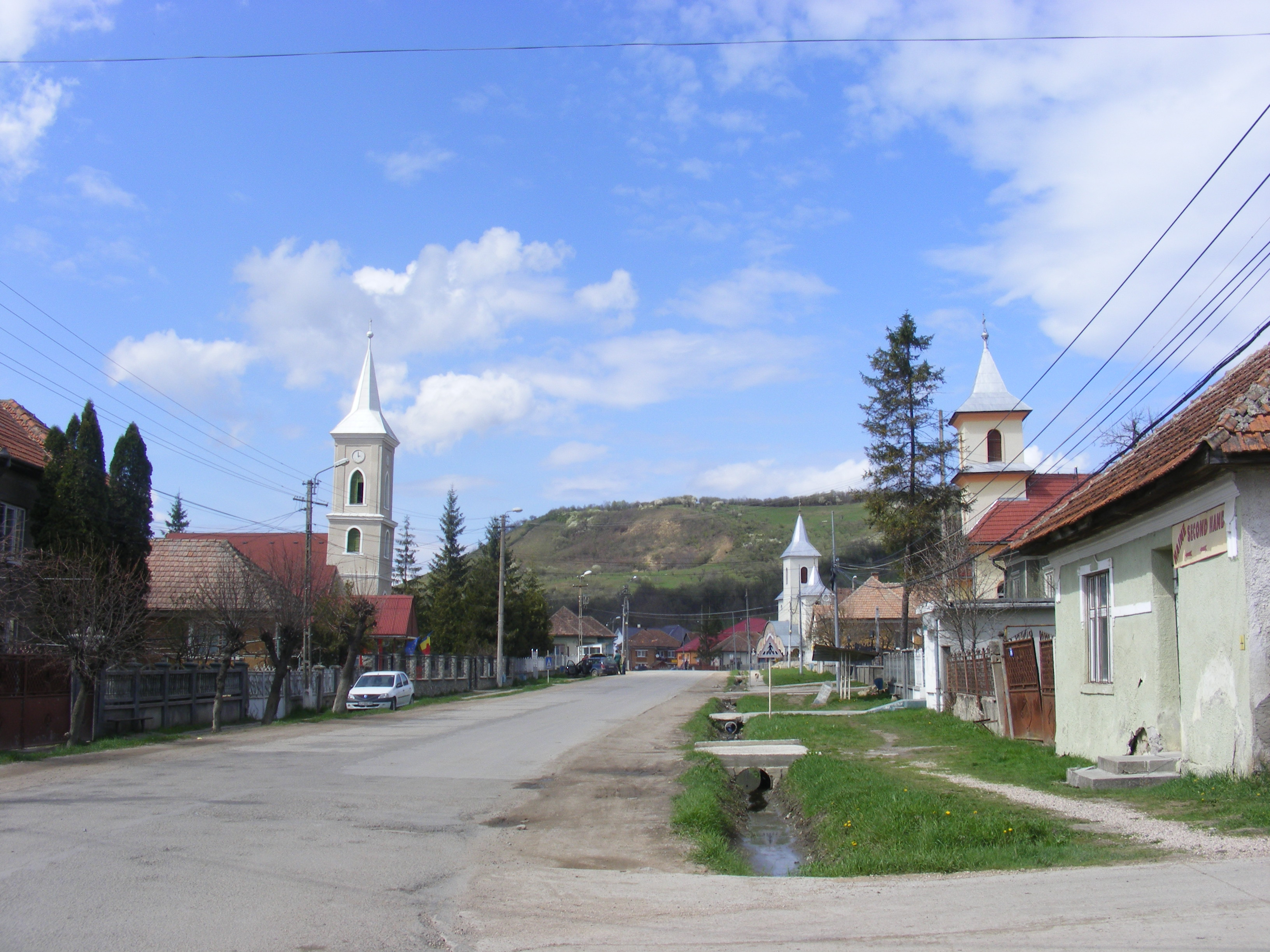

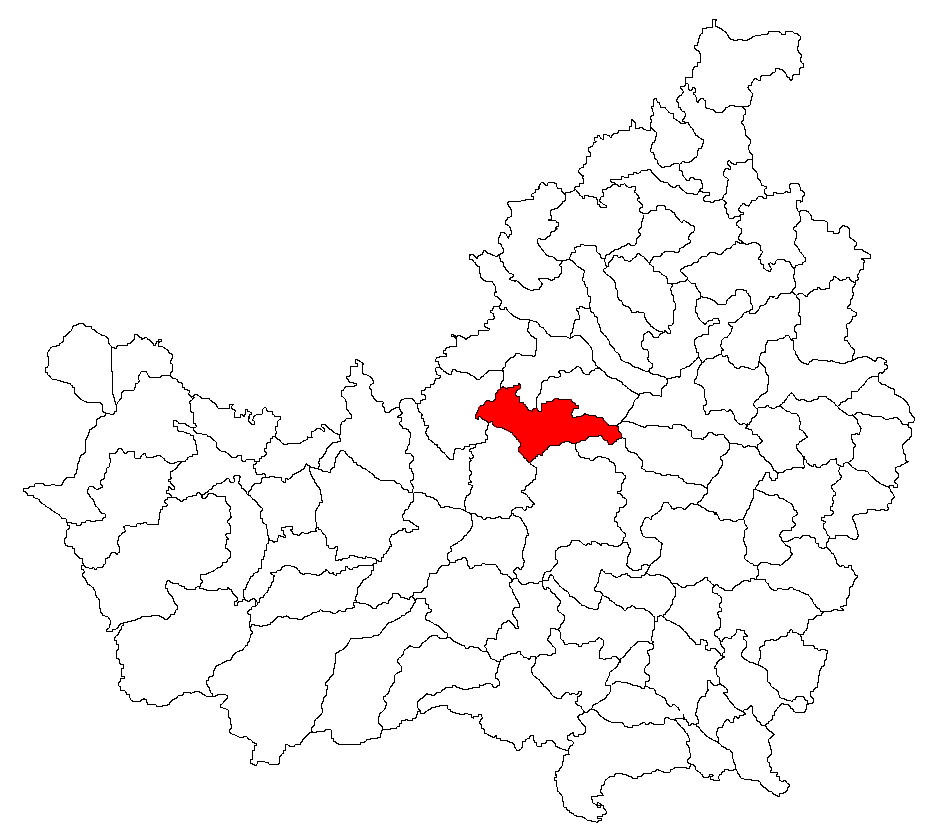
- Location in Cluj County

- Location in Romania
- Coordinates: 46°51′40″N 23°32′20″E
- Country: Romania
- County: Cluj
- Established: 1263
- Subdivisions: Chinteni, Deușu, Feiurdeni, Măcicașu, Pădureni, Săliștea Veche, Sânmărtin, Vechea

Government
  - Mayor (2024–2028): Magdalena Lucia Suciu (PSD)
- Area: 98 km^{2} (38 sq mi)
- Elevation: 475 m (1,558 ft)
- Population (2021-12-01): 4,533
  - Density: 46/km^{2} (120/sq mi)
- Time zone: UTC+02:00 (EET)
  - Summer (DST): UTC+03:00 (EEST)
- Postal code: 407205
- Area code: +(40) x64
- Vehicle reg.: CJ
- Website: www.primariachinteni.ro

Chinteni (formerly known as Chintău;;Hungarian: Kajántó; German: Kallentau) is a commune in Cluj County, Transylvania, Romania. It is composed of nine villages: Chinteni, Deușu (Diós), Feiurdeni (Fejérd), Măcicașu (Magyarmacskás), Pădureni (Fejérdi fogadók), Săliștea Veche (Szellőcskevölgy), Sânmărtin (Szentmártonmacskás), Satu Lung (Hosszúmacskás), and Vechea (Bodonkút).

== Villages ==
=== Vechea ===
Vechea is a village in Chinteni commune, with a population of 2,075 people (2002). The village population is mostly Romanian, along with a few Hungarian families.

==== History ====
Vechea has a long attested history of more than 2000 years. Under the direction of professor Vasile Suciu, a small museum was set up at the local school, with artifacts discovered in the area. These artifacts attest the long history of human life in that part of the world.

==== Geography ====
There are 3 churches in Vechea, two Orthodox and one Calvinist. One of the Orthodox church was built in 1726, a marvel of wood architecture, conserving most of its original structure.

Vechea is divided from Deușu village only by the national road from Cluj-Napoca to Vultureni–Borșa.

=== Feiurdeni ===
Feiuredni has a long history as well. Until the 1980s it had a high population, but the growing industry in the nearby Cluj-Napoca combined with a difficult commute resulted in a massive migration of the young families to the city. At one point the regular bus between the village and the city was cut off. Nowadays it's a reverse phenomenon people are moving back in the village. The causes are thin time the low price of houses and the high cost of living in the city for the lower income families.

Feiurdeni has a Roma (Gypsy) community concentrated in the Buna quarter of the village. Numerous back in time they moved in the city in the last decade of the communist regime, now are moving back in the village where life is no so expensive as in the city.

==== History ====
Feiurdeni is a farming village. Most of the families are living from agriculture. Before the communist reign, the village was producing milk and dairy products for the nearby city. The tradition last during the communism, few families managed to live from the free trade of dairy products, an example is the Rațiu family (known as Sigo).

During the Second World War the hills around the village were disputed in a violent battle between the Soviet and the German armies.

The Orthodox Church has a Roman architecture, having as its model a Swiss Calvinist Church.

== Demographics ==
At the 2021 census, the commune had a population of 4,533; Romanians made up 77.3% of the population, Hungarians made up 12.8%, and Roma made up 1.1%.

== Natives ==
- Ioan Miszti (born 1969), footballer

== Notes ==
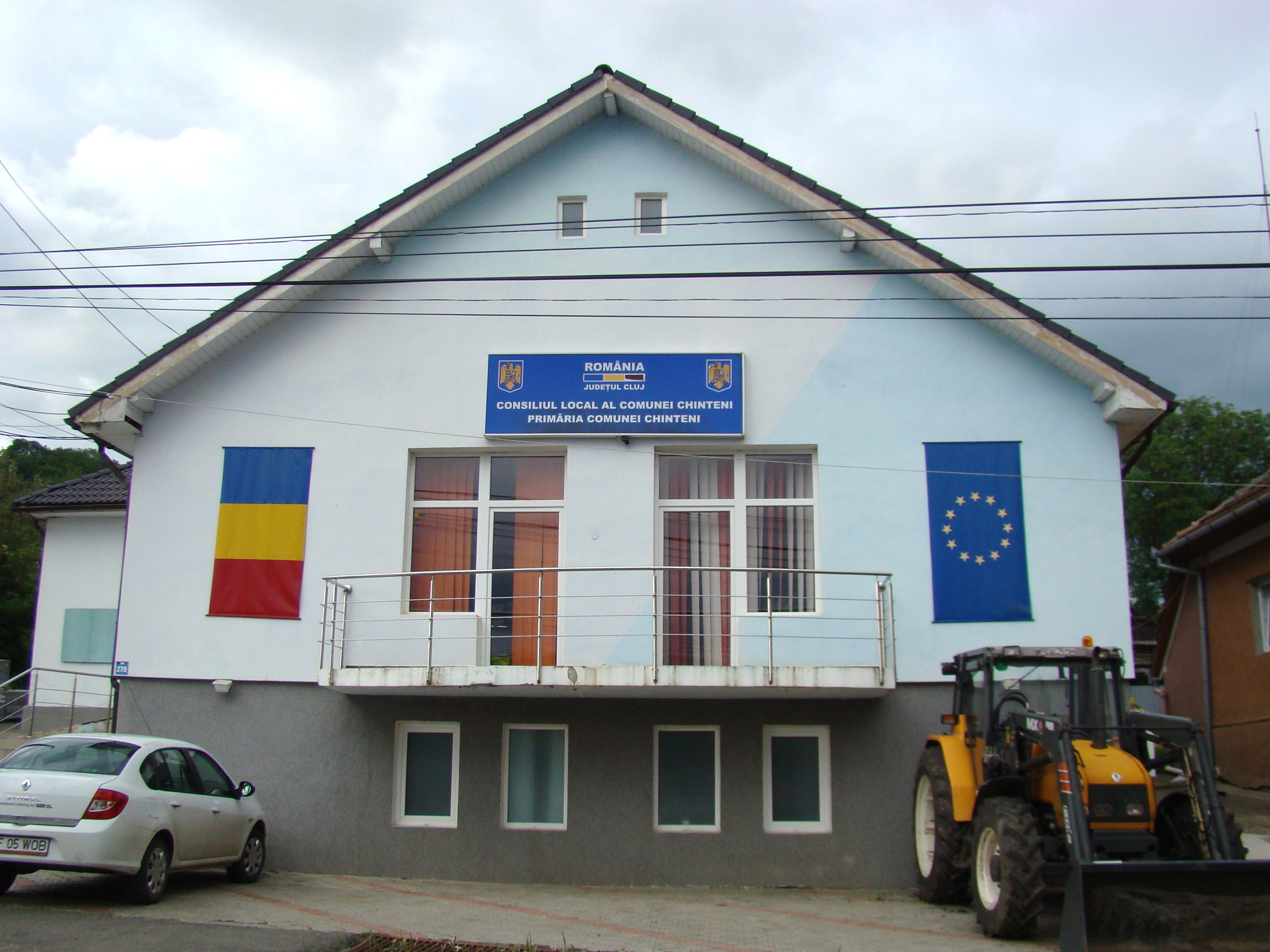
Chinteni town hall

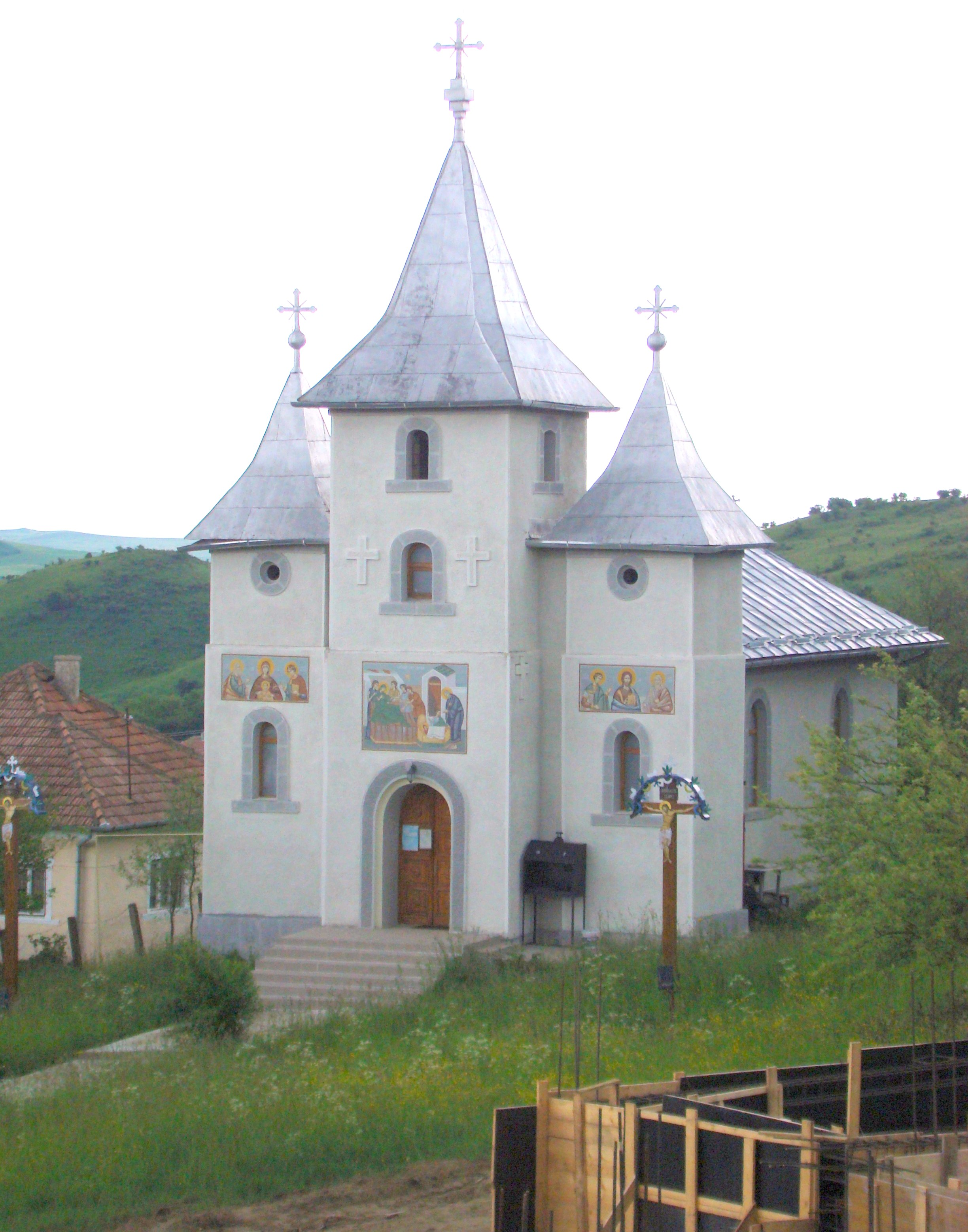
Orthodox church in Deușu

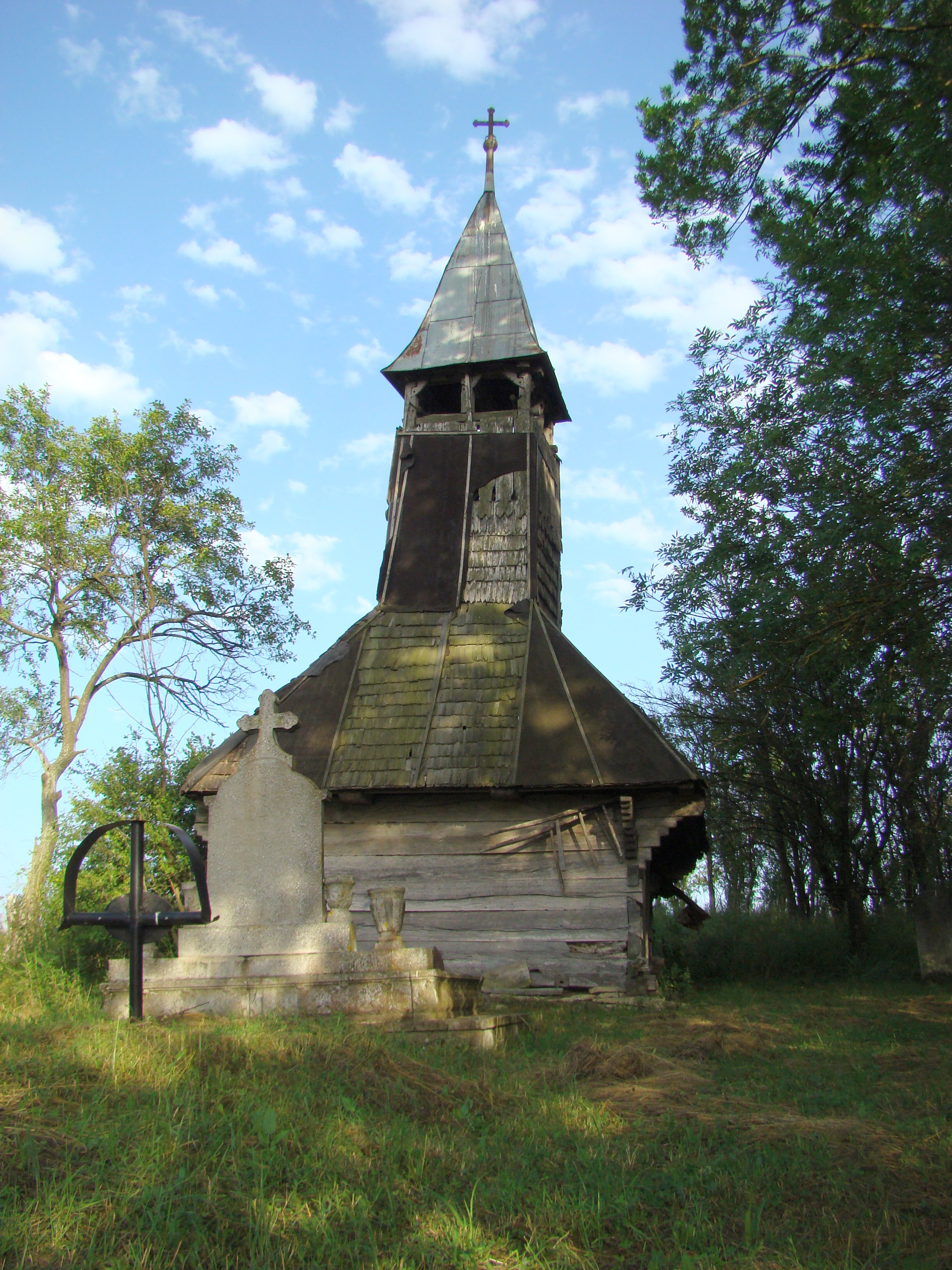
Wooden church in Săliștea Veche

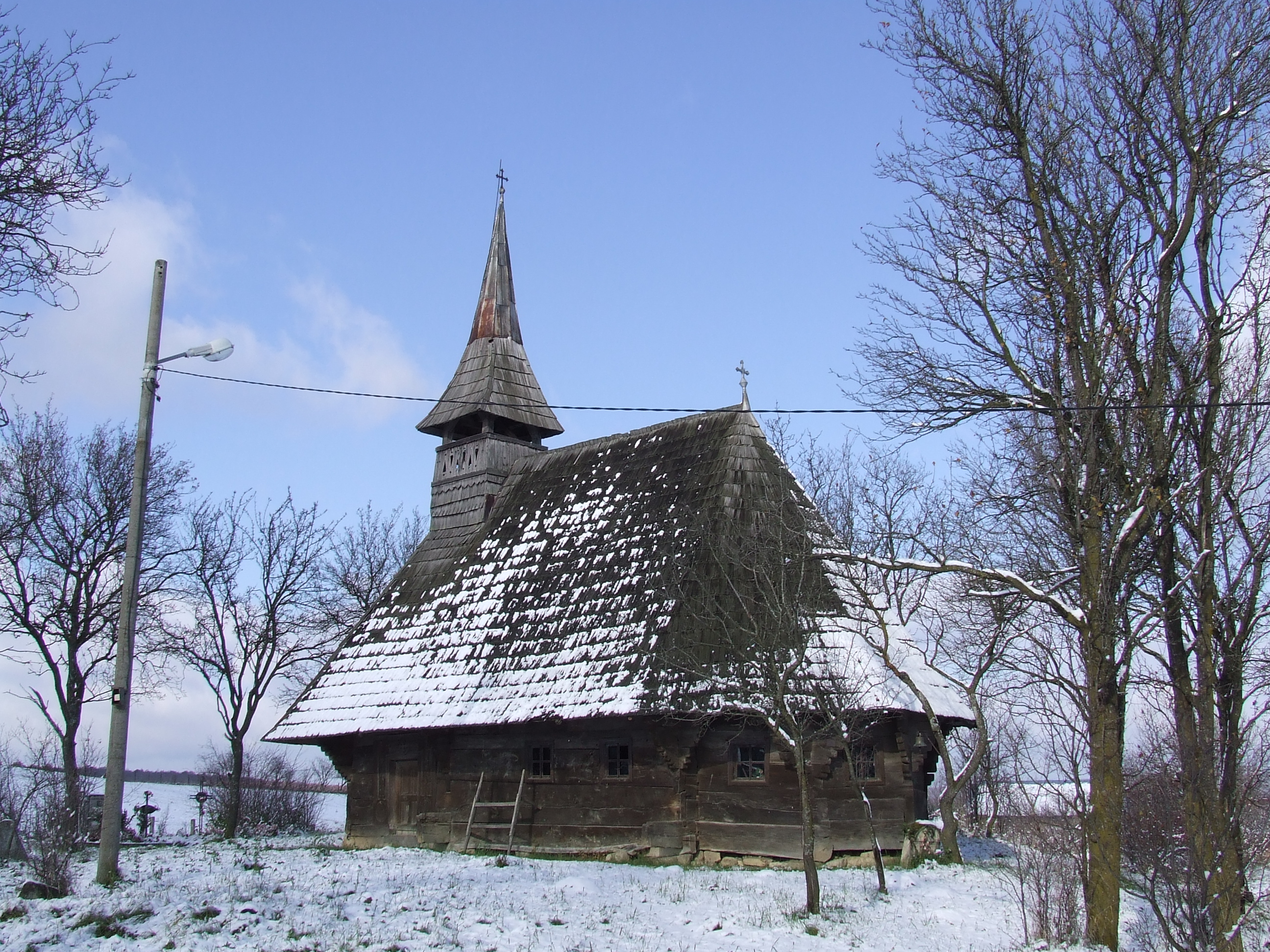
Wooden church in Vechea
