= Kolozsmonostor Abbey =

Historic Benedictine Christian monastery in present-day Romania

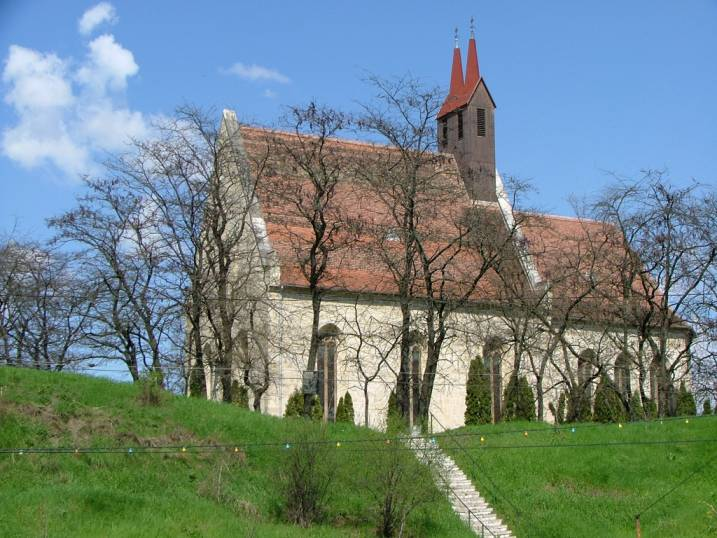
- Interactive map of Kolozsmonostor Abbey

Monastery information
- Other name: Abbey of Cluj-Mănăștur
- Order: Benedictine
- Established: 1080s-1090s
- Diocese: Transylvania

People
- Founder: Ladislaus I of Hungary

Site
- Location: Mănăștur, Cluj-Napoca, Romania
- Coordinates: 46.76129°N 23.55794°E

The Kolozsmonostor Abbey was a Benedictine Christian monastery at Kolozsmonostor in Transylvania in the medieval Kingdom of Hungary (now Mănăștur in Cluj-Napoca in Romania). According to modern scholars' consensus, the monastery was established by Ladislaus I of Hungary before 1095.

== Establishment ==
The Kolozsvár Abbey was the first Benedictine monastery in Transylvania, but medieval documents contain contradictory information about its foundation. According to a royal charter issued in 1341, Ladislaus I of Hungary established it. However, a late 14th-century forged version of a 1263 charter stated that Béla I of Hungary had set up the abbey, while an excerpt made around 1430 from the same charter named Stephen I of Hungary as its founder. The two latters document also recorded that Ladislaus I of Hungary had made a large grant to the monastery. Historian György Györffy says, both Stephen I and Béla I were most probably copied from the list of the benefactors of the bishopric of Eger in a 1261 charter, although the reference to Béla I may have preserved a genuine tradition. Historians István Bóna, Elek Benkő and István Keul agree that the monastery was established by Ladislaus I before 1095.

== History ==
The monastery was dedicated to the Virgin Mary.

The abbey developed into an important place of authentication.

== Sources ==
- Benkő, Elek (1994). "Kolozsmonostor". In Kristó, Gyula; Engel, Pál; Makk, Ferenc (eds.). Korai magyar történeti lexikon (9–14. század) [Encyclopedia of the Early Hungarian History (9th–14th centuries)] (in Hungarian). Akadémiai Kiadó. pp. 363–3644. ISBN 963-05-6722-9.
- Bóna, István (1994). "The Hungarian–Slav Period (895–1172)". In Köpeczi, Béla; Barta, Gábor; Bóna, István; Makkai, László; Szász, Zoltán; Borus, Judit (eds.). History of Transylvania. Akadémiai Kiadó. pp. 109–177. ISBN 963-05-6703-2.
- Györffy, György (1987). Az Árpád-kori Magyarország történeti földrajza, III: Heves, Hont, Hunyad, Keve, Kolozs, Komárom, Krassó, Kraszna, Küküllő megye és Kunság [Historical Geography of Hungary of the Árpáds, Volume I: The Counties of Heves, Hont, Hunyad, Keve, Kolozs, Komárom, Krassó, Kraszna, Küküllő, and the Kunság] (in Hungarian). Akadémiai Kiadó. ISBN 963-05-3613-7.
- Keul, István (2009). Early Modern Religious Communities in East-Central Europe: Ethnic Diversity, Denominational Plurality, and Corporative Politics in the Principality of Transylvania (1526–1691). Brill. ISBN 978-90-04-17652-2.
- Kiss, Gergely (2013). Királyi egyházak a középkori Magyarországon [Royal Churches in Medieval Hungary] (in Hungarian). Pécsi Történettudományért Kulturális Egyesület. ISBN 978-963-642-442-8.
- Niessen, James P. (2016). "Catholic monasticism, orders, and societies in Hungary: centuries of expansion, disaster, and revival". In Angeli Murzaku, Ines (ed.). Monasticism in Eastern Europe and the Former Soviet Republics. Routledge. pp. 86–109. ISBN 978-0-415-81959-6.
