= Stará Bystrica astronomical clock =

Astronomical clock in Stará Bystrica

Coordinates: 49°20′45.96″N 18°56′12.59″E

- Slovenský orloj
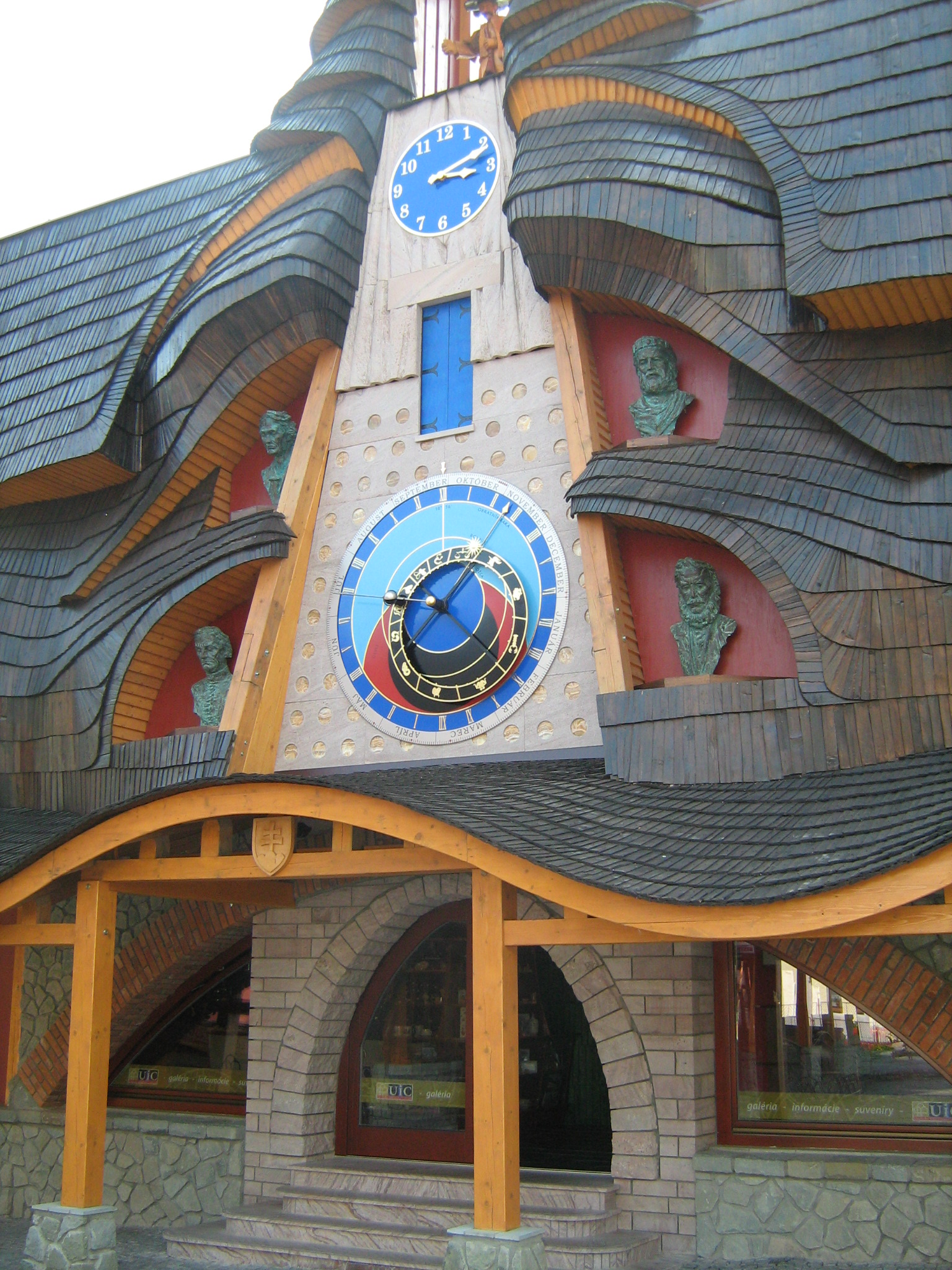
- Interactive map of Stará Bystrica astronomical clock
- Location: Stará Bystrica, Žilina Region, Slovakia
- Designer: Viliam Loviška
- Material: Wood and stone

The Stará Bystrica astronomical clock (Slovak: Slovenský orloj) is an astronomical clock located in the village of Stará Bystrica in the Žilina Region of Slovakia. It is the only astronomical clock in Slovakia.

As part of the reconstruction of the village square, one of the youngest astronomical clocks in the world was built in Stará Bystrica, completed in 2009. The building was designed by Slovak sculptor Viliam Loviška.

The astronomical part of the clock consists of an astrolabe displaying the astrological signs, positions of the Sun and Moon, and the lunar phases. The clock is controlled by computer using DCF77 signals.

== History ==
The heart of the astronomical clock was inserted into the building by a crane in 2009, before that, the astrolabe was developed and created by Prague masters for a year and a half. As part of the reconstruction of the village square, one of the youngest astronomical clocks in the world was built in the village, which was completed in 2009 and launched and consecrated on July 18, 2009, making it the first astronomical clock in Slovakia.

In 2025, the clock was stopped for renovation. Due to the damage of its moving parts and electronic components, the mechanism required more fundamental service and configuration after more than 15 years of operation. For this reason, the municipality proceeded to shutdown the clock for the first time in its existence.

== Description ==
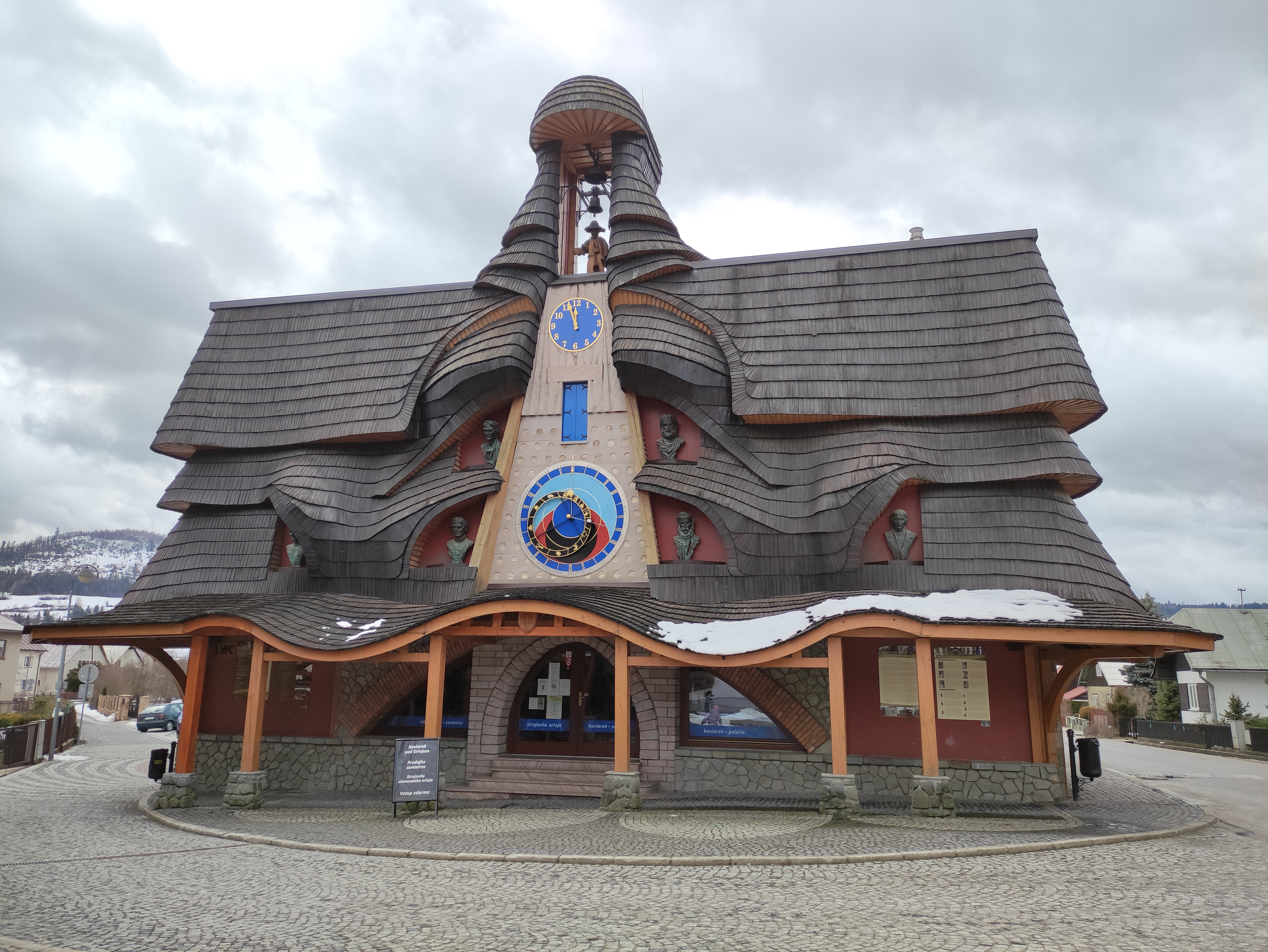
The whole building.

The astronomical clock has the shape of a stylized form of Our Lady of Sorrows, patron of Slovakia, it has also been described as the largest wooden statue of Slovakia. Its exterior is decorated by statues of important figures from Slovakia's history: Prince Pribina, King Svatopluk, Anton Bernolák, Ľudovít Štúr, Milan Rastislav Štefánik and Andrej Hlinka. Each hour, statues of saints connected with Slovakia appear: Cyril, Methodius, Andrew-Zorard, Benedict, Gorazd, Bystrík and Adalbert.

There are two bells inside the tower of the astronomical clock. One bell strikes for the time, the other bell creates a sound backdrop during the Apostles' Promenade. The striking bell (dulcimer) bears the name Sv. Juraj (St. George) and the text: Slovak Astronomical Clock Stará Bystrica R. P. 2009. The bell was cast by the Žilina district governor Juraj Blanár. The second bell bears the name Riečnická Madona (Our Lady of Riečnica) and the text: In memory of the flooded villages of Riečnica and Harvelka, it was cast by the Nitra bishop Mons.
