= Stará Bystrica =

- Municipality
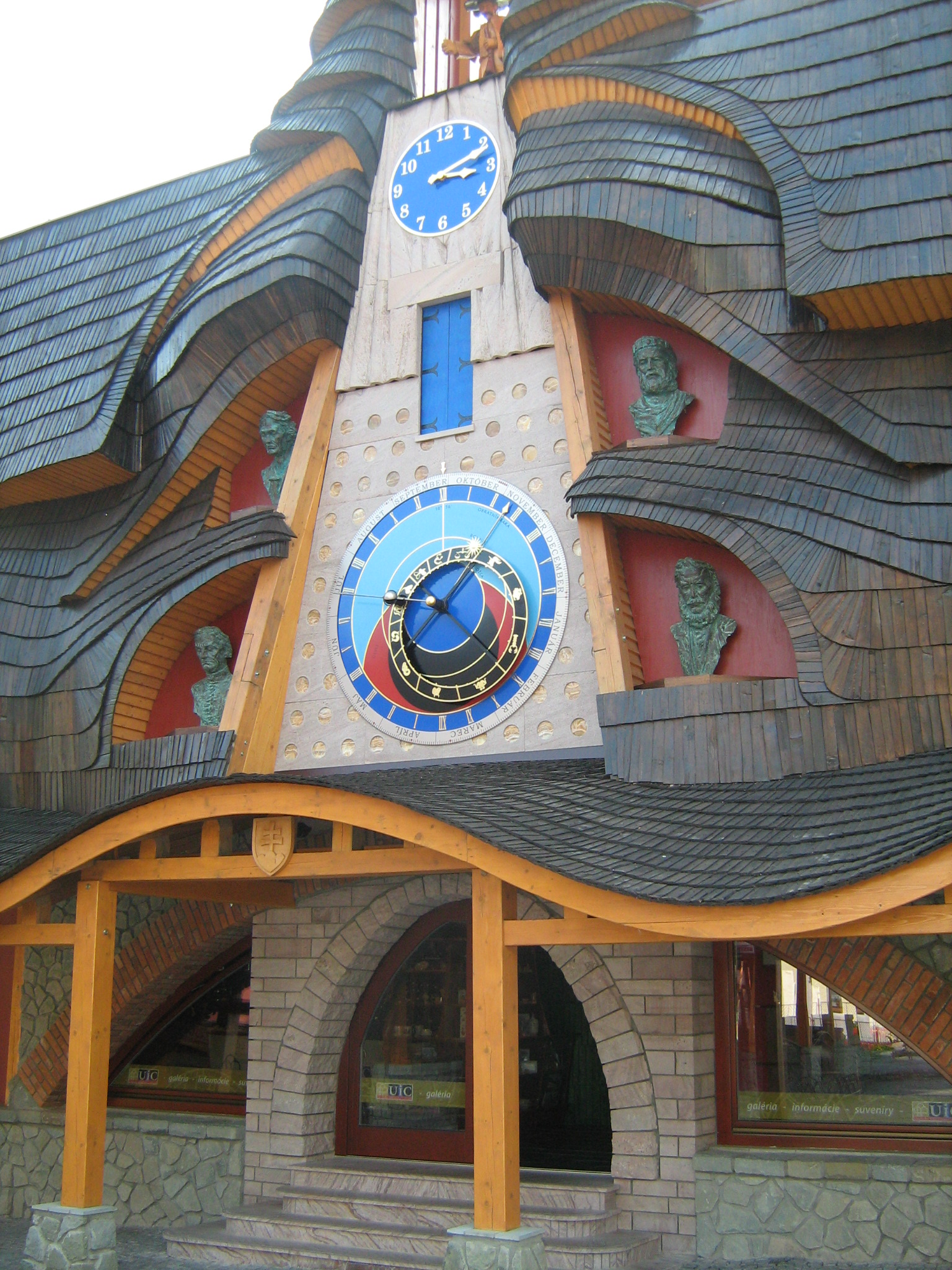
- Stará Bystrica astronomical clock

- Flag

- Location of Stará Bystrica in the Žilina Region Location of Stará Bystrica in Slovakia
- Coordinates: 49.35°N 18.95°E
- Country: Slovakia
- Region: Žilina Region
- District: Čadca District
- First mentioned: 1662

Area
  - Total: 36.90 km^{2} (14.25 sq mi)
- Elevation: 487 m (1,598 ft)

Population (2025)
  - Total: 2,810
- Time zone: UTC+1 (CET)
  - Summer (DST): UTC+2 (CEST)
- Postal code: 230 4
- Area code: +421 41
- Vehicle registration plate (until 2022): CA
- Website: www.starabystrica.sk/sk/

Stará Bystrica (Hungarian: Óbeszterce) is a village and municipality in Čadca District in the Žilina Region of Northern Slovakia. It is the home to one of the world's youngest astronomical clocks, completed in 2009.

== History ==
In historical records, the village was first mentioned in 1417.

== Geography ==
The municipality lies at an altitude of 487 metres (1,598 ft) and covers an area of 36.90 km^{2} (14.25 sq mi) (2025).

== Astronomical clock ==
During the reconstruction of the town square, the Stará Bystrica astronomical clock was built in the municipality; it was completed in 2009.

The astronomical clock has the shape of a stylized form of Our Lady of Sorrows, patron of Slovakia; it has been described as the largest wooden statue of Slovakia. Its exterior is decorated by statues of important figures from Slovakia's history: Prince Pribina, King Svatopluk, Anton Bernolák, Ľudovít Štúr, Milan Rastislav Štefánik, Andrej Hlinka. Each hour, statuettes of saints connected with Slovakia appear: Cyril, Methodius, Andrew-Zorard, Benedict, Gorazd, Bystrík and Adalbert. The bells of the clock carry the names Sv. Juraj (St. George) and Riečnická Madona (Our Lady of Riečnica); the first is rung to indicate the time, the second accompanies the saints.

The astronomical part of the clock consists of an astrolabe displaying the astrological signs, positions of the Sun and Moon, and the lunar phases. The clock is controlled by computer using DCF77 signals.

== Population ==
Population statistic (10 years)
| Year | 1995 | 2005 | 2015 | 2025 |
|---|---|---|---|---|
| Count | 2597 | 2676 | 2719 | 2810 |
| Difference | | +3.04% | +1.60% | +3.34% |

Population statistic
| Year | 2024 | 2025 |
|---|---|---|
| Count | 2817 | 2810 |
| Difference | | −0.24% |

It has a population of 2810 people (31 December 2025).

=== Ethnicity ===
Census 2021 (1+ %)
| Ethnicity | Number | Fraction |
|---|---|---|
| Slovak | 2683 | 97.91% |
| Not found out | 66 | 2.4% |
| Total | 2740 | |

In year 2021 was 2740 people by ethnicity 2683 as Slovak, 66 as Not found out, 19 as Czech, 5 as Other, 3 as Polish, 3 as German, 2 as Hungarian, 1 as Russian and 1 as English.

Note on population: The difference values of population numbers in the table "Population statistic" and in the sections "Ethnicity" & "Religion" is caused by the use of various statistical methods.

=== Religion ===
Census 2021 (1+ %)
| Religion | Number | Fraction |
|---|---|---|
| Roman Catholic Church | 2487 | 90.77% |
| None | 144 | 5.26% |
| Not found out | 67 | 2.45% |
| Total | 2740 | |

In year 2021 was 2740 people by religion 2487 from Roman Catholic Church, 144 from None, 67 from Not found out, 13 from Christian Congregations in Slovakia, 10 from Evangelical Church, 4 from Calvinist Church, 4 from Ad hoc movements, 3 from Other, 3 from Greek Catholic Church, 2 from Jehovah's Witnesses, 1 from Paganism and natural spirituality, 1 from Other and not ascertained christian church and 1 from Buddhism.

== Notes and references ==
- Stará Bystrica a okolie by Oskár Dubovický and Ján Podmanický. Published by Print-Servis Bratislava 1998. (in Slovak) ISBN 80-88755-81-6.
