= Viliam =

Viliam is a Slovak form of the masculine given name William. Notable people with the name include:

- Viliam Amersek or Vili Ameršek (born 1948), retired Slovenian football player
- Viliam Figuš-Bystrý (born Viliam Figuš) (1875–1937), Slovak composer, teacher, author of the first Slovak national opera Detvan
- Viliam Hýravý (born 1962), Slovak football player
- Viliam Judák (9 November 1959) is the Diocesan Bishop of Nitra, Slovakia
- Viliam König (1903–1973), Czech football manager and former player
- Viliam Loviska (born 1964), Slovak sculptor, painter, designer, educator and organiser of the cultural life
- Viliam Macko (born 1981), Slovak football player
- Viliam Schrojf (1931–2007), former Slovak football goalkeeper
- Viliam Široký (1902–1971), Communist politician of Czechoslovakia, the Prime Minister from 1953 to 1963
- Viliam Tankó (born 1995), Slovak boxer and politician
- Viliam Tvrský (1880–1943), Czech fencer
- Viliam Žingor (1912–1950), Slovak general, anti-fascist fighter

== See also ==
- William (disambiguation)
- Viliame (disambiguation)
- Viliamu
