= James (bishop of Nyitra) =

13th-century Hungarian Catholic bishop

- Bishop of Nyitra
- Installed: 1221/1223
- Term ended: 11 April 1241
- Predecessor: John
- Successor: Adam

Personal details
- Died: 11 April 1241 Mohi, Kingdom of Hungary
- Denomination: Catholic Church

James (Hungarian: Jakab; died 11 April 1241) was a Hungarian Catholic prelate in the 13th century, who served as Bishop of Nyitra (today Nitra, Slovakia) from 1223 until his death.

== Career ==
James was elected as bishop sometime between 1221 (when his predecessor John is last mentioned) and 1223 (when he first appears in this dignity). He was the first incumbent Bishop of Nyitra, whose name was listed among the Hungarian prelates in royal charters since 1224. James donated several estates and vineyards and their associated income (tithe) to the Benedictine monastery of Skalka (Szkalka) in Trencsén County (today Skalka nad Váhom, Slovakia), dedicated to the local hermit Benedict of Skalka in 1224. Several historians considered James founded the abbey itself, but the monastery was in fact erected by one of James' predecessors already before 1208. James also allowed the Benedictine monks to preach and confess freely in his diocese. James' donation letter was transcribed in 1297. According to a note, James later exchanged the portion of the tithes of his bishopric that had been ceded to the monastery for the tithes of the people of the abbey.

During his episcopate, James bought several lands in order to expand the property of his diocese. He pledged a portion in the village Keltkő (later Zsitvatő, present-day a borough of Radvaň nad Dunajom, Slovakia) and a surrounding fishpond along the Danube in 1226. He also bought a portion in Emőke, a village located near Nyitra (today Nitra, Slovakia) in 1231. He also acquired the other half of the settlement Biccse (today Bytča, Slovakia) and the nearby Kotessó (today Kotešová, Slovakia) from castle warriors of Trencsén County. He exchanged the village Bodok in Nyitra County (today Dolné Obdokovce, Slovakia) for Vezekény in Bars County with the Garamszentbenedek Abbey (present-day Hronský Beňadik, Slovakia) in 1228. Upon the request of King Andrew II of Hungary, he donated Lelőc to the Crown and subsequently he was compensated with the estate Nádas (today Nedašovce, Slovakia), then an accessory of the castle of Nyitra, in 1232.

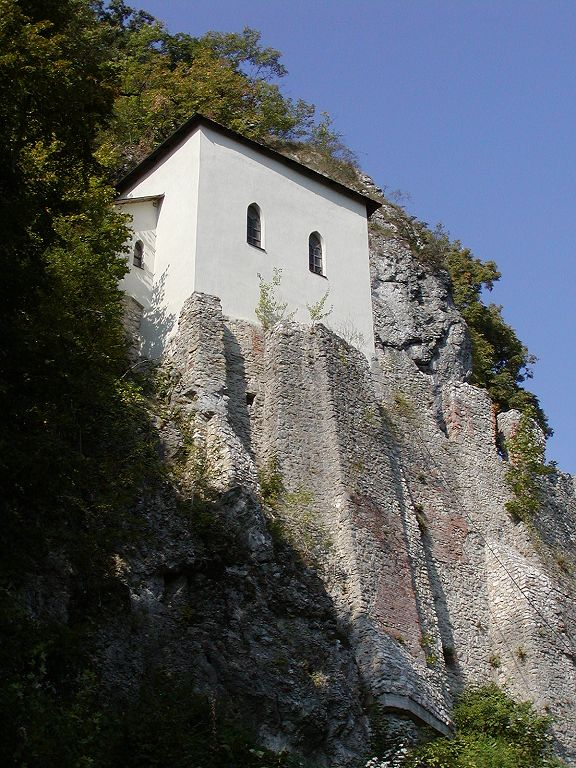
The monastery of Skalka in Slovakia

King Andrew II of Hungary persuaded his heir and eldest son Béla to separate from his wife, Maria Laskarina in 1222. Andrew planned to arrange a new marriage for Béla, but Pope Honorius III mediated a reconciliation between Béla and Maria in the autumn of 1223. This angered Andrew, and Béla fled to Austria, where Duke Leopold VI sheltered him. Béla returned in 1224 after the bishops persuaded Andrew to forgive him. Nevertheless, border clashes took place between Hungary and Austria throughout 1224 and 1225, before the peace negotiations began. The Hungarian king was represented by James during the meeting. Andrew and Leopold concluded the Treaty of Graz on 6 June 1225. According to German historian Heide Dienst, the document was drafted by James. The arriving papal legate Conrad of Urach vouched for the treaty. James again performed a diplomatic mission in the winter of 1228, when took a journey to Velehrad, where Ottokar I of Bohemia confirmed the privileges of the local Cistercian monastery. Historian Veronika Rudolf considered Jamed acted as an envoy of Pope Gregory IX there, when the pope's conflict with Frederick II, Holy Roman Emperor has reached its peak. James was mandated to hinder the proposed marriage between Frederick and Ottokar's daughter Agnes.

When Thomas, Archbishop of Esztergom died around November 1224, the local cathedral chapter could not agree unanimously about the new archbishop. Two rival factions emerged in the following months: a large part of the canons nominated Bishop Desiderius of Csanád, while some members of the college supported the candidacy of James. Pope Honorius refused to recognize both elections, citing the contradicted canonical rules of procedure. Finally, the pope appointed Robert as the Archbishop of Esztergom in March 1226. James also took part in the consecration of the new church of the Pannonhalma Abbey around 1225. Under James, the Franciscans settled in his episcopal see Nyitra shortly after 1228. James consecrated their first church in the town, dedicated to Blessed Virgin Mary in November 1230. He also consecrated the church of Deáki (today Diakovce, Slovakia), alongside Briccius, Bishop of Vác. Pope Gregory IX delegated him to judge in the various stages (1227–1228, 1235) of a harsh litigation between the Pannonhalma Abbey and a Hungarian lord Demetrius Csák regarding the right of ownership over the castle Németújvár (present-day Güssing, Austria). Simultaneously in 1227, James also acted as a judge in the lawsuit between the Pannonhalma Abbey and the Diocese of Veszprém over the right of collection of tithes in Somogy County.

James was among the prelates, who took an oath to the agreement at Bereg in the presence of papal legate James of Pecorara in early 1234. When John, Bishop of Bosnia, put Hungary under a new interdict in the first half of 1234, because Andrew had not dismissed his non-Christian officials despite his oath of Bereg, Pope Gregory ordered Ugrin Csák, Archbishop of Kalocsa, James of Nyitra and Abbot Uros of Pannonhalma to investigate the case. According to Roger of Torre Maggiore's Carmen miserabile, James was one of the prelates, who was killed in the disastrous Battle of Mohi on 11 April 1241, during the first Mongol invasion of Hungary. Roger described James as "a man of laudable conduct and famous for the excellence of his morals".

== Sources ==
=== Primary sources ===
- Master Roger's Epistle to the Sorrowful Lament upon the Destruction of the Kingdom of Hungary by the Tatars (Translated and Annotated by János M. Bak and Martyn Rady) (2010). In: Rady, Martyn; Veszprémy, László; Bak, János M. (2010); Anonymus and Master Roger; CEU Press; ISBN 978-9639776951.

=== Secondary sources ===
- Beke, Margit (2003). "Róbert [Robert]". In Beke, Margit (ed.). Esztergomi érsekek 1001–2003 [Archbishops of Esztergom 1001–2003] (in Hungarian). Szent István Társulat. pp. 98–103. ISBN 963-361-472-4.
- F. Romhányi, Beatrix (2000). Kolostorok és társaskáptalanok a középkori Magyarországon: Katalógus [Monasteries and Collegiate Chapters in Medieval Hungary: A Catalogue] (in Hungarian). Pytheas. ISBN 963-7483-07-1.
- Koszta, László (2009). "A nyitrai püspökség létrejötte. (Nyitra egyháztörténete a 9-13. században) [The Emergence of the Bishopric of Nyitra. (Ecclesiastical History of Nyitra in the 9th to 13th Centuries)]". Századok (in Hungarian). 143 (2). Magyar Történelmi Társulat: 257–318. ISSN 0039-8098.
- Rudolf, Veronika (2019). "Nyitrai püspökök a diplomácia szolgálatában az 1220-es években [The Bishops of Nyitra in diplomatic service in the 1220s]". Turul (in Hungarian). 92 (1). Magyar Heraldikai és Genealógiai Társaság: 33–36. ISSN 1216-7258.
- Zsoldos, Attila (2011). Magyarország világi archontológiája, 1000–1301 [Secular Archontology of Hungary, 1000–1301] (in Hungarian). História, MTA Történettudományi Intézete. ISBN 978-963-9627-38-3.
- Zsoldos, Attila (2022). Az Aranybulla királya [The King of the Golden Bull] (in Hungarian). Városi Levéltár és Kutatóintézet. ISBN 978-963-8406-26-2.

Catholic Church titles
Preceded by John	Bishop of Nyitra; 1223–1241	Succeeded by Adam
