= Karol Kmeťko =

- Bishop of Nitra
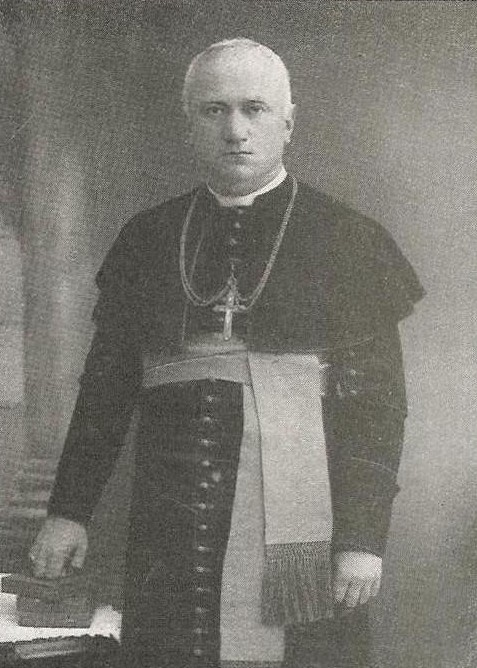
- Church: Catholic Church
- Diocese: Diocese of Nitra
- In office: 16 December 1920 – 22 December 1948
- Predecessor: Vilmos Batthyány
- Successor: Ján Pásztor
- Other post: Archbishop (personal title) of Nitra (1944-1948)

Orders
- Ordination: 2 July 1899
- Consecration: 13 February 1921 by Clemente Micara

Personal details
- Born: 12 December 1875 Veľké Držkovce, Trencsén County, Kingdom of Hungary, Transleithania, Austria-Hungary
- Died: 22 December 1948 (aged 73) Nitra, Czechoslovak Republic

Karol Kmeťko (December 12, 1875 – December 22, 1948) was the Roman Catholic Bishop of Nitra in Slovakia (1920-1948) and personal archbishop (from 1944).

== Early life and ordination ==
Born in Veľké Držkovce, in the Trencsén County of the Kingdom of Hungary (present-day Slovakia), his interest in Catholicism led him to the priesthood. At the age of 23, Kmetko was ordained a priest in Nitra on July 2, 1899. Twenty-one years later, on February 13, 1921, he was appointed Bishop of Nitra.

== Bishop ==
Before the 1942 deportations of Jews from Slovakia, Kmeťko confronted the president of the Slovak State, Jozef Tiso, with reliable reports of the murder of Jews in Ukraine. Kmeťko asked: "How can the government allow [the deportations], when it is said that they carry the [Jews] off to their death?" According to Kmeťko, Tiso replied "with something that I [Kmeťko] could not fully accept: ‘It’s enough for me that I have assurances from the Germans that they treat [the Jews] humanely, that they are used there as workers. For if Slovaks can go to Germany to work, why can’t the [Jews] do the same?’"

On May 11, 1944, Kmeťko was appointed Archbishop of Nitra in Slovakia. According to the Catholic Hierarchy, Kmetko was a priest for 49.5 years and a bishop for 27.9 years. He died in December 1948 at the age of seventy-three.
