= Adam (bishop of Nyitra) =

13th-century Hungarian Catholic bishop

- Bishop of Nyitra
- Installed: 1241/1243
- Term ended: 1249/1253
- Predecessor: James
- Successor: Nicholas

Personal details
- Died: after 1249
- Denomination: Catholic Church

Adam (Hungarian: Ádám; died after 1249) was a Hungarian Catholic prelate in the 13th century, who served as Bishop of Nyitra (today Nitra, Slovakia) at least from 1243 to 1249.

== Career ==
Adam was elected Bishop of Nyitra sometime after the first Mongol invasion of Hungary. His predecessor James was killed in the Battle of Mohi in 1241. Adam was styled as bishop-elect in July 1243, when Pope Innocent IV instructed him and Peter, a canon of Kalocsa to arrange for the transfer of Benedict Osl from the diocese of Várad to Győr.

Adam is first mentioned as a confirmed suffragan in June 1244. Upon the instruction of King Béla IV, he registered a certain noble Ders as the new owner of the land Dubnica in Nyitra County (present-day a borough of Bojnice, Slovakia) in November 1244. Prior to that, Ders was forced to hand over his estate Parna in Pozsony County, and was granted Dubnica as a compensation. Adam instructed his cathedral chapter (a place of authentication) to determine and record the boundaries of Ders' new estate. Adam's role in the process reflects the transitional situation between the disintegration of the pristaldus (bailiff) institution and the still undeveloped practice of the homo regius (king's man) institution in the middle of the 13th century. Adam assumed a similar role in December 1244. Throughout 1244–1245, the pope mandated Adam to judge four lawsuits involving the Pannonhalma Abbey, alongside co-judges Archbishop Stephen Báncsa and the abbot of Pilis.

Adam registered Andrew Hont-Pázmány to the ownership of Mánya (Maňa) was lying under Turóc Castle (also known as Znió or Zniev, present-day near Kláštor pod Znievom, Slovakia) in April 1249. Adam is also mentioned among the witnesses by the establishing charter of Turóc Abbey in 1252. However its interpolated list of dignities reflects a situation from the year 1248, which thus does not prove that Adam held the position even in 1252. Nevertheless, the next bishop Nicholas first appears in contemporary records in 1253.

== Sources ==
- Barabás, Gábor (2023). Delegated Papal Jurisdiction in Arpadian Hungary. Bishops – provosts – papal chaplains. Arpadiana XVI., Research Centre for the Humanities. ISBN 978-963-416-405-0.
- Kurecskó, Mihály (2000). "A nyitrai káptalan hiteleshelyi tevékenysége a kezdetektől 1269-ig [The Activity of the Nyitra Chapter as a Place of Authentication from the Beginnings until 1269]". In Piti, Ferenc; Szabados, György (eds.). "Magyaroknak eleiről". Ünnepi tanulmányok a hatvan esztendős Makk Ferenc tiszteletére (in Hungarian). Szegedi Középkorász Műhely. pp. 329–347. ISBN 963-482-500-1.
- Szentpétery, Imre (1927). Az Árpád-házi királyok okleveleinek kritikai jegyzéke I. kötet 2. füzet, 1001–1270 [A Critical Register of Royal Charters from the House of Árpád, Vol. 1. No. 2.] (in Hungarian). Magyar Országos Levéltár.
- Zsoldos, Attila (2011). Magyarország világi archontológiája, 1000–1301 [Secular Archontology of Hungary, 1000–1301] (in Hungarian). História, MTA Történettudományi Intézete. ISBN 978-963-9627-38-3.

Catholic Church titles
Preceded by James	Bishop of Nyitra; 1243–1249	Succeeded by Nicholas
