= Bystrík =

Hungarian bishop and martyr

Saint Bystrík
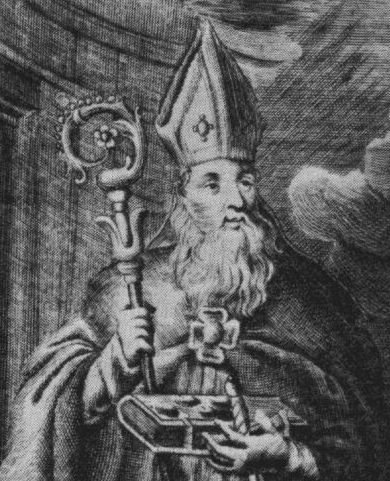
- Saint Bystrík from Ungaricae Sanctitatis Indicia 1692
- Born: 1003? Nitra, Kingdom of Hungary
- Died: September 27, 1046; Pest, Kingdom of Hungary
- Venerated in: Roman Catholic Church
- Canonized: 1083, Szabolcs, Kingdom of Hungary
- Feast: September 24
- Attributes: Sword, boat, episcopal attributes

Saint Bystrík (Latin Beztertus Nitriensis, Bestredius, Bestridus, Bestricus, Bistridus, Bistritus; Hungarian Beszteréd, Besztrik, Besztríd; died 1046) was a martyr and the Bishop of the Diocese of Nitra.

== Bystrík's bishopric ==
Bystrík was probably of Slavic or Hungarian origin. The exact place and time of birth of St. Bystrík is unknown, however he seems to have come from aristocratic family who had been Christianised in the mission of Cyril and Methodius before the end of the Great Moravian Empire in 907 AD. He was likely born sometime at the turn of the 10th and 11th centuries in the vicinity of Nitra. It is assumed that Bystrík graduated from the St. Hypolita school at Zobor Abbey. The disciples of Cyril and Saint Gorazd were spreading out from Zobor at this time and included Astrik, Prokop, Svorad, Benedict and Maurus.

He lived during the time when the first King of Hungary, Stephen I, undertook the Christianization of the Hungarian clans. Stephen I appointed Bystrík as bishop of Nitra, Kingdom of Hungary (present day Slovakia) around the year 1034.

== Martyrdom ==
According to legend, Bystrík was murdered during the Vatha pagan rising of 1046 near the Danube in present-day Budapest together with bishop Gerard Sagredo (Hungarian: Gellért) and bishop Buldus (Bőd), as they were en route to Budapest for the coronation of the future king, Andrew I of Hungary.

On September 24, the bishops were attacked by Vatha's mob, who began stoning them. Buldus died immediately. Bystrík, together with bishop Beneta, managed to flee on a boat across the Danube river. Bystrík was mortally wounded by a sword on the Pest river bank by the pagans before they could be rescued by the incoming Andrew I. Bystrík died on September 27, the third day after the attack.

== Canonisation ==
Bystrík was canonised during the reign of King Ladislaus I of Hungary in 1083. The remembrance day of Saint Bystrík falls on September 24. In Hungary, this is the day when St. Gerard Sagredo is celebrated together with his co-martyrs, Saint Bystrík and Saint Buldus.

== Veneration ==
The oldest depiction of the saint dates back to the baroque era and can be found in the a Jesuit publication by Gabriel Hevenesi entitled Ungaricae Sanctitatis Indicia from the year 1692 as Hoffman's copperplate.

Reverence for Saint Bystrík is not very widespread, but there are approximately two dozen of his depictions throughout Slovakia and Hungary, and in Slovak communities in Australia, Canada, Italy, Poland and the United States. Saint Bystrík can be seen on frescos, on glass, bells, as well as on paintings made on wood and fabric.

On September 15, 2006 the first church was devoted to him in Nemce near Banská Bystrica, Slovakia. Another church with a devotion to Saint Bystrík stands in Hajná Nová Ves. Saint Bystrík's House is located in Čičmany.

=== Iconography ===
Saint Bystrík is portrayed as a bishop with a book and all attributes that denote the person of a bishop: cope, mitre, crosier, gloves, and ring of the bishop. In his left hand, apart from the book, he often holds a sword that is the symbol of the way he died. Sometimes he is portrayed with a boat, on which he travelled across the Danube river.

== Historicity ==
Bystrík is mentioned not only in records of the Nitra bishopric, but his name appears also in the Vatican Apostolic Archive. The earliest mention of it can be found in the legend of St. Gerard (13th century). Legend describes the events from the time of the Hungarian uprising in 1046 when Bishops Buldu and Bystríka rescue Bishop Benett from the hands of insurgents. Most Hungarian chronicles of later periods which were taken over from the legendary description of the events surrounding the martyrdom of Bishop Gerard included a description of the martyrdom of St. Bystríka. He is also mentioned in the Chronicon Pictum of the 14th century, Buda Chronicle, Dubnic Chronicle, Munich Chronicle, written in German chronicle of Henry of Mügeln and chronicles of Johannes de Thurocz and Antonio Bonfini (1491–1496).

Considering the tradition of St. Bystrík as bishop of Nitra is old. The first surviving historical sources proving his involvement in Nitra are the Annales ecclesiastici regni Hungariae by Melchior Inchofer dating from 1644 AD.

According to current historiography, the historicity of Bystrik is uncertain. He could however be historical and may have served King Stephen I sometime around 1034 AD.
