= Verbum =

Verbum may refer to:

- Word, the smallest element that may be uttered in isolation with semantic or pragmatic content
- Verb, from the Latin verbum meaning word, is a word (part of speech) that in syntax conveys an action or a state of being
- Logos, an important term in philosophy, psychology, rhetoric, and religion
- Dei verbum, one of the principal documents of the Second Vatican Council
- Verbum (magazine), an early personal computer and computer art magazine focusing on interactive art and computer graphics
- Verbum (Slovak magazine), a Slovak language magazine focused primarily on writings of the Catholic intelligentsia
- A 1942 lithograph by M. C. Escher
- A version of Logos Bible Software designed to help Christians to study the Bible
