= Ján Chryzostom Korec =

Slovak Jesuit priest and Roman Catholic cardinal (1924–2015)

His Eminence Ján Chryzostom Korec S.J.
- Cardinal, Bishop Emeritus of Nitra
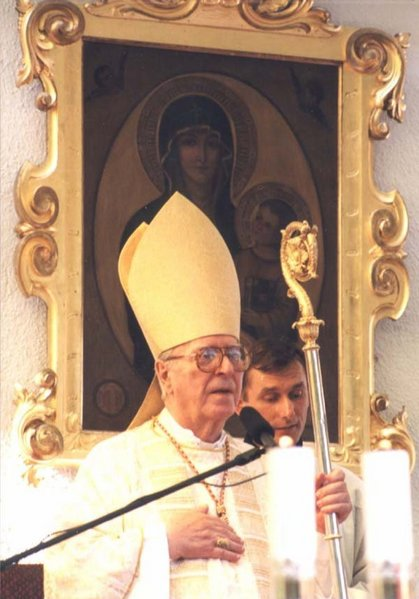
- Church: Catholic
- Archdiocese: Nitra
- Installed: 1990
- Term ended: 9 June 2005
- Predecessor: Ján Pásztor
- Successor: Viliam Judák
- Other post: Cardinal-Priest of Santi Fabiano e Venanzio a Villa Fiorelli

Orders
- Ordination: 1 October 1950
- Consecration: 24 August 1951
- Created cardinal: 28 June 1991 by John Paul II
- Rank: Cardinal

Personal details
- Born: 22 January 1924 Bošany, Czechoslovakia (Present day Slovakia)
- Died: 24 October 2015 (aged 91) Nitra, Slovakia
- Motto: Ut Omnes Unum Sint
- Coat of arms

Ján Chryzostom Korec, SJ (22 January 1924 – 24 October 2015) was a Slovak Jesuit priest and a cardinal of the Catholic Church. He was ordained as a priest in 1950 and consecrated as a bishop in 1951.

Because of the government's suppression of the Catholic Church, he spent 39 years working as a priest without government authorisation, either in prison or by supporting himself as a labourer.

In 1990, Pope John Paul II named him Bishop of Nitra and in 1991 named him a cardinal. Korec retired in 2005 and died in 2015.

== Early life ==
He was born to a working-class family. His father, Ján Korec, and his mother, Mária Drábiková, were labourers at a local leather factory in Bošany. He had two older siblings; his brother, Anton, was imprisoned during the first wave of communist persecution in 1951, and his sister was Štefánia. His family lived a humble life with limited resources.

Korec entered the Society of Jesus in 1939 and studied Catholic theology and philosophy.

== Under communism ==
During the order's suppression by the communists, he was forced to discontinue his philosophical studies. He entered the priesthood in 1950. One year later, at the age of 27, he was secretly consecrated a bishop by Bishop Pavol Hnilica on 24 August 1951 and became the youngest Catholic bishop in the world. He then worked for three years at the Tatrachema Company and then at the Institute of Work Hygiene and Work-Related Diseases. On 30 June 1958, he was forced to leave the institute, and on 10 September, he began working as a night watchman for the Prefa Company. He then worked as a maintenance worker at the Juraj Dimitrov Chemical Company, one of the largest companies in Bratislava.

He was imprisoned from 1960 to 1968 and meanwhile cared for the spiritual welfare of his fellow prisoners. Korec spent most of that period in Valdice, a Czech prison. There were at least 250 priests and several bishops being held: Vojtašák, Zela, Otčenášek, Hlad and Hopko. The clergymen were forced to share prison cells with some of the country's worst criminals. He later described his experiences in Night of the Barbarians. After many petitions, he was released during a general amnesty in 1968.

Despite his bad health, Korec continued to work as a street cleaner and as a factory worker. He meanwhile also continued his active life as a leader of the underground Church. He led spiritual retreats for students and counseled young people, seminarians and priests. His private apartment in Petržalka on Vilova Street 7 became a highly-sought centre of his underground ministry. Many people, laypersons and priests went to him for spiritual advice. Because the publication of Christian literature was proscribed, Korec wrote samizdat books, which were secretly printed and distributed. He also secretly ordained priests because the law allowed for the ordination by government-approved clerics and limited ordinations so that it could restrict church activity.

The secret police, the Štátna Tajná Bezpečnost, watched Korec's apartment closely, and two attempts were made to assassinate him.

== Later life ==
In 1990, after the fall of the Iron Curtain, Pope John Paul II appointed Korec bishop of Nitra

Arms of Cardinal Korec

On 29 May 1991, John Paul II made Korec a cardinal. He was invested as a cardinal in a consistory on 28 June and was named cardinal-priest of Santi Fabiano e Venanzio a Villa Fiorelli.

On 13 June 2012, Korec was admitted to the hospital for a ruptured appendix. He suffered a perforated appendicitis and severe peritonitis, and his vital signs were beginning to fail. The doctors operated on him, but his condition still remained critical. By 18 June, it was announced that his condition had not improved and that he was breathing only by a respirator. On 20 June, it was announced that the condition of Korec had significantly improved, which was a great surprise for all of Slovakia.

Korec remained active in the Church and in his social life. He received three honorary degrees from universities in the United States. He published regularly, especially in the Slovak magazine "Kultúrny Život".

After the fall of the Iron Curtain and the revival of democracy in Czechoslovakia, Korec became an influential leader in all aspects of social, economic and political developments in Slovakia.

He supported Slovak independence and opposed the Christian Democrats, who implemented stringent free-market policies that caused a rapid rise in unemployment and economic hardship. He allied himself more closely with the left-wing parties and Slovak Prime Minister Vladimír Mečiar, who played a significant role in the Velvet Divorce between the Czechs and the Slovaks and tried to maintain a certain political neutrality.

The 40 years of communist domination left the Slovak Catholic Church in ruins. There was a shortage of priests, and church buildings needed to be renovated. In addition, Catholic education had suffered severe drawbacks, and new schools needed to be built. There was also a shortage of teachers, and Catholic media was nonexistent. Besides restoring the Church and Catholic education, he restored a good relationship with the Jewish minority.

In 1987, Korec was one of the 24 Slovak activists who signed the "Declaration of Apology," an official apology to all Jews in Slovakia who had suffered deportation during World War II. The Cardinal condemned the deportations, which he called "an inhumane act".

In retirement, Korec lived in Nitra and remained active as a writer and adviser.

== Awards ==
For his proper footing and steadfast faith, Korec was granted several awards and honorary doctorates. His life's work was also appreciated at foreign universities, including the University of Notre Dame, in South Bend (1986); Sacred Heart University in Bridgeport (1992); and the Catholic University of America in Washington DC (1993). Other honorary doctorates were awarded to him by the Cardinal Stefan Wyszyński University, Warsaw (2003). In February 2014, Liverpool Hope University, in Britain, awarded him an honorary doctorate for his lifelong achievements on behalf of freedom, democracy and world peace.

He won in 1993, the state prize of the French Republic, in 1995 the state award Rad Stur Class and in 1999 the state award Order of Andrej Hlinka.

== Criticism ==
Some segments of the community criticised Korec because he was perceived as having a positive attitude towards fascist war criminal Jozef Tiso and the first Slovak Republic. Critics cite for example the 1990 unveiling of a commemorative plaque for Tiso in Banovce nad Bebravou or the memorial service he held for Tiso and the 50th anniversary of Tiso's execution. In August 1997, he publicly defended the exiled historian Milan Stanislav Ďurica in connection with the controversial book "History of Slovakia and Slovaks, which advocated several policies from the period of the first Slovak Republic.

== Writing ==
His book production accounts for more than 80 titles each with several editions and is a prominent part of the Slovak Christian literature of the 20th century. His writing is also included in numerous and various Samizdat magazines. These publications include:

- Philosophical questions of dialectical materialism, 1947.
- The drama of atheistic humanism. Reflections on Christian spirituality.
- The origin of man, (Samizdat, 1949)
- The responsibility of Sciences, (Samizdat, 1971)
- Over the origin and development of life, (Samizdat, 1971)
- Salvation in Christ, (Samizdat, 1972)
- In the light of the Good News. (Samizdat, 1985)
- Christ the priest, (Samizdat, 1987)
- The mission of the priest, (Samizdat, 1987)
- Church amid challenges, (Samizdat, 1987)
- Church of development, (Samizdat, 1987)
- Reflections on man, Bratislava, I-II, 1992/1993 3rd ed. 1992 (formerly CA, 1986).
- Who is the man. In: (Slovak views, 1993), no. 1
- Cyril and Methodius tradition today. In: (Slovak views, 1993, no. 7)
- Philosopher of common sense. In: (Verbum, 2000, no. 4), pp. 65–88.

== Bibliography ==
- Korec, Ján (1996). Die Nacht der Barbaren-Als Geheimbischof in der Kirche des Schweigens 1950–1970 (in German). Graz-Vienna-Cologne: Verlag Styria. pp. 111–113.
- Spolok Slovenských Spisovateľov (1999). Život a dielo Jána Chryzostoma Korca (in Slovak). Nitra, Slovakia: Filozofická Fakulta UKF.
