= Gervasius (bishop of Nyitra) =

12th-century Hungarian Catholic bishop

- Bishop of Nyitra
- Installed: 1100/c. 1105
- Term ended: c. 1128/1134
- Predecessor: diocese re-established
- Successor: Nicholas

Personal details
- Died: after c. 1128
- Denomination: Catholic Church

Gervasius (Hungarian: Gyárfás, died after c. 1128) was a Hungarian Catholic prelate in the 12th century. He was the first bishop of the Diocese of Nyitra in the Kingdom of Hungary (today Nitra, Slovakia), which was re-established after its Great Moravian roots two hundred years ago.

== Career ==
The Diocese of Nyitra was re-established sometime after 1100, because the Article 22 of the First Code of Coloman, King of Hungary still referred to the Nyitra Church as a collegiate chapter in that year. According to an undated diploma extract preserved by the collection book Liber ruber in the Pannonhalma Abbey, a certain Gervasius was already styled as bishop of Nyitra. Majority of the scholars dated the document in the period between 1105 and 1110. Therefore, it is likely that Gervasius was the first bishop of the diocese after its re-establishment by King Coloman. The diploma extract narrates that Moses, the ispán of Nyitra County intended to take the estate Sala along the river Váh (Vág) (today Šaľa, Slovakia) away from the Pannonhalma Abbey, which had previously granted the land from Stephen I of Hungary, and Gervasius was entrusted to judge over the litigation. According to his judgement after presiding a trial by ordeal (of red-hot iron) in Esztergom, Sala remained a property of Pannonhalma. According to historian László Koszta, his superior Lawrence, Archbishop of Esztergom was that prelate, who ordered Gervasius to investigate the case. This and the place of the trial imply that Gervasius, as bishop of Nyitra acted on behalf of the archbishop in the matter of the disputed property located in the territory of the Archdiocese of Esztergom.

Gervasius is again mentioned as bishop by a royal charter of Stephen II of Hungary – a royal grant to a certain Füle (or Fila) – issued in the period between 1125 and 1128. Gervasius was succeeded by Nicholas, who is mentioned in this capacity in 1134.

== Sources ==
- Koszta, László (2009). "A nyitrai püspökség létrejötte. (Nyitra egyháztörténete a 9-13. században) [The Emergence of the Bishopric of Nyitra. (Ecclesiastical History of Nyitra in the 9th to 13th Centuries)]". Századok (in Hungarian). 143 (2). Magyar Történelmi Társulat: 257–318. ISSN 0039-8098.
- Zsoldos, Attila (2011). Magyarország világi archontológiája, 1000–1301 [Secular Archontology of Hungary, 1000–1301] (in Hungarian). História, MTA Történettudományi Intézete. ISBN 978-963-9627-38-3.

Catholic Church titles
Preceded by diocese re-established	Bishop of Nyitra c. 1105–1128	Succeeded by Nicholas
