= John I (bishop of Nyitra) =

12th-century Hungarian Catholic bishop

John
- Bishop of Nyitra
- Installed: 1156 or before
- Term ended: 1156 or later
- Predecessor: Nicholas (?)
- Successor: Everard (?)

Personal details
- Died: after 1156
- Denomination: Catholic Church

John (Hungarian: János; died after 1156) was a Hungarian Catholic prelate in the 12th century, who served as Bishop of Nyitra (today Nitra, Slovakia) around 1156.

John was elected as bishop sometime after 1134, when his last known predecessor Nicholas is mentioned. John's episcopate is mentioned by a single source, a charter of Martyrius, Archbishop of Esztergom from 1156. Accordingly, John was present during the consecration of the parish church of Baratka or Bratka in Bars County (laid near present-day Levice, Slovakia) with three altars.

== Sources ==
- Koszta, László (2009). "A nyitrai püspökség létrejötte. (Nyitra egyháztörténete a 9-13. században) [The Emergence of the Bishopric of Nyitra. (Ecclesiastical History of Nyitra in the 9th to 13th Centuries)]". Századok (in Hungarian). 143 (2). Magyar Történelmi Társulat: 257–318. ISSN 0039-8098.
- Zsoldos, Attila (2011). Magyarország világi archontológiája, 1000–1301 [Secular Archontology of Hungary, 1000–1301] (in Hungarian). História, MTA Történettudományi Intézete. ISBN 978-963-9627-38-3.

Catholic Church titles
Preceded by Nicholas (?)	Bishop of Nyitra fl. 1156	Succeeded by Everard (?)
