= Ladislav Hanus =

Slovak Neo-Thomist philosopher and priest (1907–1994)

Apostolic Protonotary Ladislav Hanus
- Church: Roman Catholic
- Previous posts: Chaplain in Spišské Vlachy (1932); Spišská Nová Ves (1933–1934); Ružomberok (1935–1938); Professor of moral theology at Spišská Kapitula seminary (1938–1950); Parish priest in Kvačany and Hybe (1968–1983)

Orders
- Rank: Apostolic Protonotary

Personal details
- Born: 26 February 1907 Liptovský Mikuláš, Austria-Hungary
- Died: 7 March 1994 (aged 87) Ružomberok, Slovakia
- Denomination: Roman Catholic
- Occupation: philosopher, art historian, essayist, publicist
- Education: University of Innsbruck (Doctorate in Theology, 1932); Spišská Kapitula seminary

Prof. PhDr. ThDr. Ladislav Hanus, DrSc. h. c. (26 February 1907 – 7 March 1994) was a Slovak Roman Catholic priest, art historian, Neo-Thomist philosopher, an important representative of Slovak cultural philosophy, professor of moral theology at Spišská Kapitula, translator, essayist, and publicist.

During the existence of the fascist Slovak State (1939–1945) he was a key figure of Catholic intellectual life, and his political convictions displayed authoritarian and clerico-fascist elements, which led him to support the regime of the Slovak People's Party. Hanus confirmed this loyalty through his sharp criticism of the Slovak National Uprising, which he described as a "fatal mistake," whose protagonists, according to him, were "foreign elements," Czechs, Protestants, and Jews.

== Biography ==
Ladislav Hanus was born on 26 February 1907 in Liptovský Mikuláš, Austria-Hungary (now Slovakia). He graduated from the secondary grammar school in Liptovský Mikuláš. From 1926, he studied theology at the seminary in Spišská Kapitula. In the academic year 1927/28 he transferred to the study of philosophy and theology in Innsbruck, where he graduated in 1932 and received a doctorate in theology. He was influenced by his teacher at Spišská Kapitula, František Skyčák Jr. (an existentially grounded Thomist cultural philosopher), and therefore became an advocate of Neo-Thomist philosophy.

As a chaplain he served in Spišské Vlachy (1932), Spišská Nová Ves (1933–1934), and finally in 1935–1938 with Andrej Hlinka in Ružomberok. From 1938 to 1950 he worked as a professor of moral theology at the seminary in Spišská Kapitula. From 1941 he edited the journal Kultúra, presented as a magazine of Slovak Christian intellectuals, and in 1944–1945 the avant-garde journal Obroda, which he followed up with the journal Verbum in 1946–1948.

In 1951–1952, he went into hiding from the state security police (in the regions of Liptov, Žilina, Kysuce). In the autumn of 1952 he was captured, harshly interrogated, and on the basis of fabricated and false accusations aimed against the Catholic Church and Catholicism he was sentenced to 16 years in prison for alleged high treason. In prison he was physically and psychologically tortured. Among his fellow prisoners were, for example, the theologian and art historian Josef Zvěřina and Bishop Ján Chryzostom Korec, among others. He was released on parole only in 1965 and could work only as a boiler stoker in a technical glass factory in Bratislava.

From 1968 he returned to priestly ministry as parish priest in Kvačany and Hybe. He retired in 1983 and from then until his death he lived in Ružomberok.

== Controversies and criticism ==
Historian Miloslav Szabó's criticism in his work Clerofascists (Slovak: Klérofašisti) focuses on Hanus's inability to recognize in time the true nature of Nazism due to his being blinded by a common enemy (communism), as well as on his persistent national and confessional prejudices.

=== Support for the wartime Slovak State and Jozef Tiso ===
Szabó characterized Hanus as a Slovak nationalist who glorified Jozef Tiso and the wartime regime. Even decades later, in his memoirs he maintained a positive attitude toward this regime and a rejecting stance toward the Slovak National Uprising.

=== National and religious prejudices ===
Szabó states that Hanus openly expressed prejudices against Protestants, Jews, and especially against Czechs. He associated Czechs with atheism and sectarianism, which he regarded as almost as great an evil as Nazism or communism.

=== Temporary succumbing to the Nazi temptation ===
Although Hanus later condemned Nazism, Szabó criticizes the fact that at a certain point (especially around 1939–1941) he sought in Nazism protection for the nation and the Church against atheist socialism. In 1939, for example, he delivered a radio speech praising "German discipline," in which he held up Germans and the German army as a model of solidarity and dedication, even after the aggression against Poland.

=== Attempts at synthesis of Christianity and National Socialism ===
In 1941 Hanus gave a lecture in which he attempted to interpret the Nazi project of a new Europe positively and proposed that the Third Reich integrate Christian ideology in order to gain stability. This attempt to find a "modus vivendi" with Nazism is seen as problematic because he evaluated the Nazi project positively and believed in Hitler’s sincerity in building a "fairer" Europe.

=== Racial terminology ===
Although Hanus in principle questioned Nazi racism, he himself operated with concepts such as a "distinct Slovak race" and acknowledged the legitimacy of eugenics in terms of protecting the "racial qualities" of the nation.

== Selected works ==
=== Books ===
- Švajčiarska cesta, 1936, a travel sketch
- Rozprava o kultúrnosti, 1943, 1991
- Rozhľadenie, 1943
- Všeobecné kresťanstvo, 1944
- Jozef Kútnik Šmálov: život, činnosť, tvorba, 1992
- Romano Guardini. Mysliteľ a pedagóg storočia, 1994
- Kostol ako symbol, 1995
- Človek a kultúra, 1997 – an expanded version of the work Filozofia kultúry
- Princíp pluralizmu, 1997
- Pokonštantínska Cirkev, 2000
- Spomienky na Ferka Skyčáka, 2001, previously published in 1984 in Canada
- Umenie a náboženstvo, 2001
- O kultúre a kultúrnosti, 2003
- Pamäti svedka storočia, Lúč, 2006 – an extensive record of interviews of Ján Maga with Hanus
- Princíp kresťanskej morálky, 2007
