= John II (bishop of Nyitra) =

13th-century Hungarian Catholic bishop

John
- Bishop of Nyitra
- Installed: 1198/1204
- Term ended: 1221/1223
- Predecessor: Everard
- Successor: James

Personal details
- Died: after 1221
- Denomination: Catholic Church

John (Hungarian: János; died after 1221) was a Hungarian Catholic prelate in the 13th century, who served as Bishop of Nyitra (today Nitra, Slovakia) at least from 1204 to 1221.

== Career ==
John was elected as bishop sometime between 1198 (when his predecessor Everard is last mentioned) and 1204 (when he first appears in this dignity).

During the 1204–1205 controversial election of the Archbishop of Esztergom, John was among the four prelates – alongside Kalán of Pécs, Boleslaus of Vác and Kalanda of Veszprém – who strongly opposed the election of John, Archbishop of Kalocsa as their new metropolitan. They jointly wrote a letter to Pope Innocent III, where they claimed the archbishops were elected jointly by the chapter and the bishops in accordance with the spirit of customary law since King St. Stephen (John was elected by the chapter, which refused to invite the bishops of the suffragan dioceses of the Archbishopric of Esztergom to participate in the election process). Subsequently, John of Nyitra, who remained the only suffragan who did not recognize the legitimacy of the election, supported the candidacy of Kalán Bár-Kalán against John of Kalocsa. In accordance with the pope's decision favoring John of Kalocsa, the suffragans expressed support for John without reservations, while John of Nyitra was forced to write a letter to Innocent, in which he stated that he would withdraw his support from Kalán if the pope did not accept his protegee's nomination.

John bought a portion of Mita, Trencsén County in 1210, expanding the possessions of the bishopric there. John acquired lands for his diocese along the river Vág (Váh) in the following years. He bought half part of Biccse (today Bytča, Slovakia) from castle warriors in Trencsén County.

Alongside papal legate Cardinal Gregorius de Crescentio and Leopold VI, Duke of Austria, John mediated between King Ottokar I of Bohemia and Andrew, Bishop of Prague in their investiture controversy in 1221. The Bohemian king confirmed the lost privileges of the Diocese of Prague in June 1221, then the papal legate lifted the excommunication over the kingdom imposed by Andrew earlier. Alongside other prelates from Austria and Poland, the name of John appeared among the testimonies of Ottokar's royal charter.

John died prior to 1223, when his successor James is mentioned as the bishop of Nyitra.

== Sources ==
- Koszta, László (2009). "A nyitrai püspökség létrejötte. (Nyitra egyháztörténete a 9-13. században) [The Emergence of the Bishopric of Nyitra. (Ecclesiastical History of Nyitra in the 9th to 13th Centuries)]". Századok (in Hungarian). 143 (2). Magyar Történelmi Társulat: 257–318. ISSN 0039-8098.
- Rudolf, Veronika (2019). "Nyitrai püspökök a diplomácia szolgálatában az 1220-es években [The Bishops of Nyitra in diplomatic service in the 1220s]". Turul (in Hungarian). 92 (1). Magyar Heraldikai és Genealógiai Társaság: 33–36. ISSN 1216-7258.
- Sweeney, James Ross (1993). "III. lnce és az esztergomi érsekválasztási vita. (A Bone Memorie II. dekretális történeti háttere) [Pope Innocent III and the Dispute Over the Election of Archbishop of Esztergom. Background to the Papal Decretal of Bone Memorie II]". Aetas (in Hungarian). 8 (1). Translated by Sebők, Ferenc. AETAS Könyv- és Lapkiadó Egyesület: 147–169. ISSN 0237-7934.
- Zsoldos, Attila (2011). Magyarország világi archontológiája, 1000–1301 [Secular Archontology of Hungary, 1000–1301] (in Hungarian). História, MTA Történettudományi Intézete. ISBN 978-963-9627-38-3.

Catholic Church titles
Preceded by Everard	Bishop of Nyitra; 1204–1221	Succeeded by James
