= Andrew Zorard =

Polish Benedictine monk

Saint Andrew Zorard
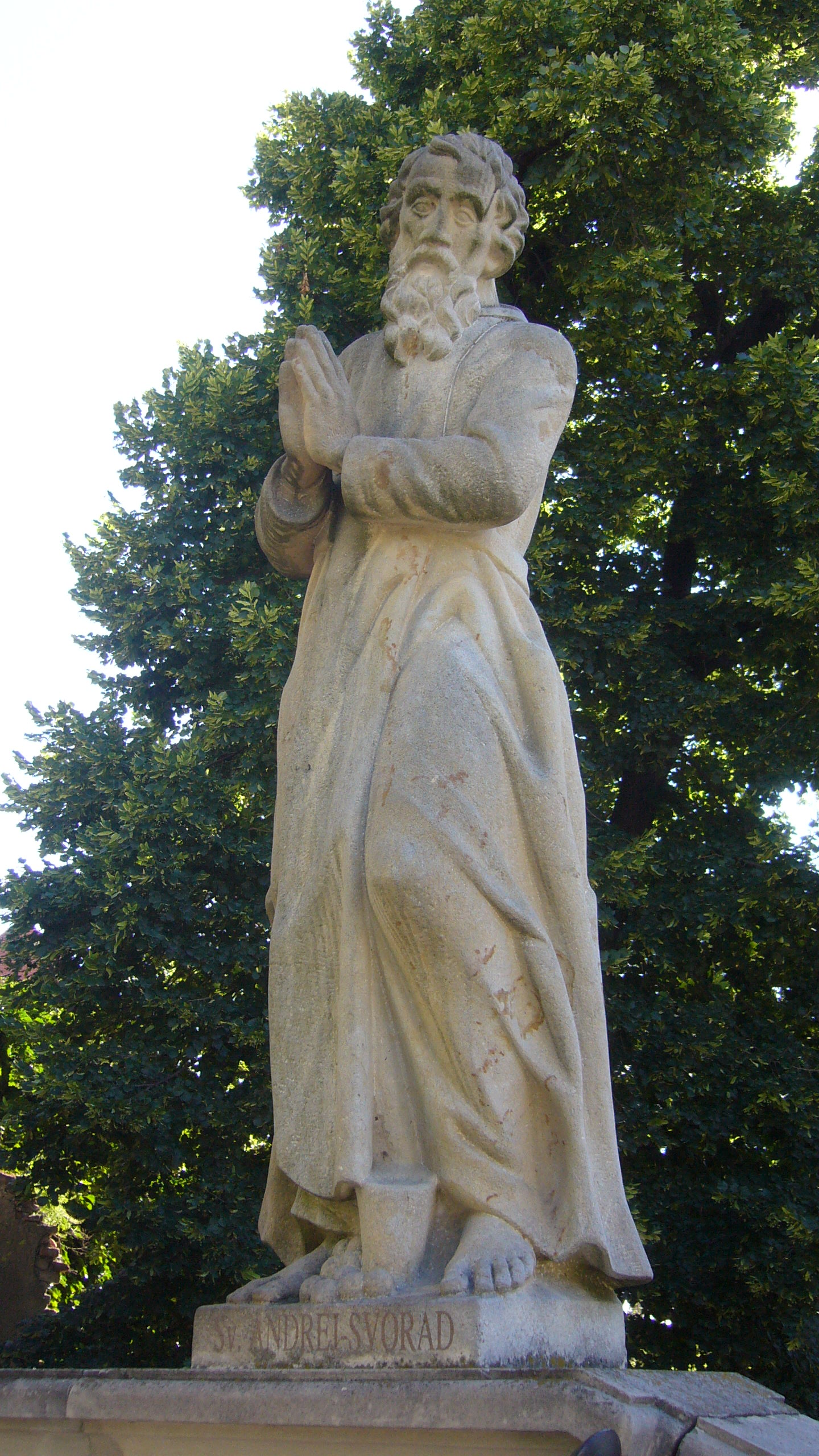
- Born: c. 980; Opatowiec, Kazimierza, Poland
- Died: c. 1030; Zobor Mountain, near Nitra, Kingdom of Hungary (modern day Slovakia)
- Venerated in: Roman Catholic Church; Eastern Orthodox Church
- Canonized: 1083 by Pope Gregory VII
- Major shrine: St. Emmeram's Cathedral
- Feast: June 13 (in Poland), July 17 (in Slovakia)
- Attributes: walnuts, eagle, chain, axe, rocks
- Patronage: Hungary, Nitra, Diocese of Nitra, Diocese of Tarnów, St. Andrew Abbey in Cleveland

Andrew Zorard (Hungarian: Zoerárd András, Szórád, Zoárd; Polish: Andrzej Świerad, Żurawek, Żórawek, Świrad, and Wszechrad; Slovak: Svorad, Andrej Svorad, Czech: Sverad; German: Zoërard, Latin: Zoerardus) was a Benedictine monk originating from Poland but active in Hungary (now Slovakia), who is venerated as a saint in the Catholic Church and the Orthodox Churches.

== Life ==
Zorard was born around 980 in Opatowiec, a small village in Poland. A tradition in the small village of Tropie holds that in his youth he lived near there as a monk. At around the year 1000, at about the age of 20, he began living as a hermit and a missionary, evangelizing in Olawa, Silesia (modern Poland). At some time, he also traveled to northern Hungary (today Slovakia)

Around the year 1003 Zorard settled in St. Hippolytus Monastery on Mt. Zobor near Nitra - then part of the Kingdom of Hungary, present day Slovakia. He became a Benedictine monk in the Abbey. He took the name "Andrew". There he became the spiritual guide of Benedict of Skalka. Zorard and Benedict, with the permission of their superior Philip, later left the monastery and became hermits in a cave along the Váh River near Skalka nad Váhom not far from Trenčín. Andrew died of natural causes around 1009. He practiced such severe austerities that, according to legend, the iron chain, which he wore wrapped around the belt, eventually grew into his body.

Benedict continued to live in the cave for three years until he was murdered by a gang of thieves looking for treasure. In 1083 Zorard's relics were transferred to St. Emmeram's Cathedral in Nitra where they remain to this day. A biography of Benedict and Zorard was written by Maurus of Nitra, Bishop of Pécs, in which it says that Zorard led a hermit life living in a small cave near the monastery. The cave has since been called Svoradova (Zorard's).

== Feast Day and veneration ==
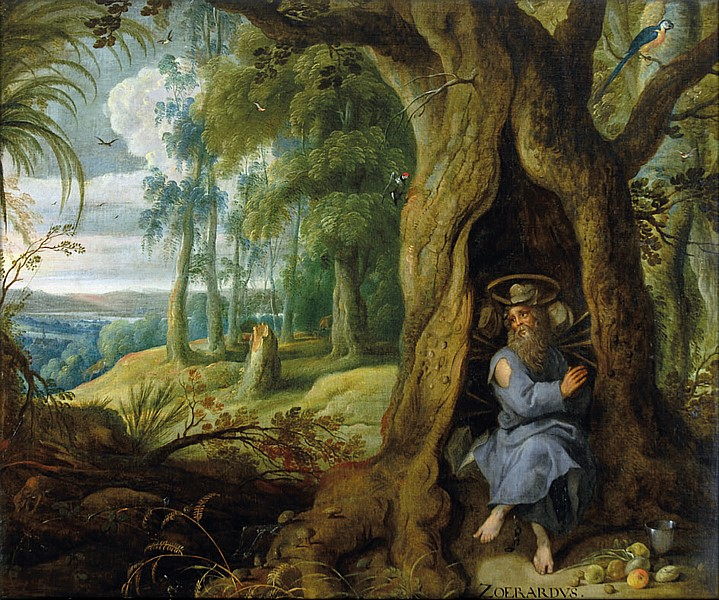
Andrew Zorard by Paul Bril and Wenzel Coebergher, 1601

Andrew is venerated especially in Hungary, Slovakia, and Poland, but also in diaspora communities of the United States. His feast day is 17 July, but in some calendars he is venerated together with Benedict on 13 July.

King Géza I of Hungary declared him one of the patron saints of Hungary. Zorard died around 1009. As early as 1064, Géza took the first steps towards his canonization. The cult of Zorard was officially confirmed in July 1083 by Pope Gregory VII, thanks to the Hungarian King Ladislaus I. Zorard's remains are located in the St. Emmeram's Cathedral in Nitra.

St. Andrew Svorad Abbey is a Benedictine monastery in Cleveland, Ohio named after Andrew Zorad.
