= Viliamu =

Viliamu is a masculine given name. Notable people with the name include:

- Viliamu Afatia (born 1990), Samoan rugby union player
- Viliamu Lesiva (born 1965), Samoan boxer

== See also ==
- Viliam
- Kyngstonn Viliamu-Asa, American football player
- Narita Viliamu Tahega (born 1989), Niuean weightlifter
