= Everard (bishop of Nyitra) =

12th-century Hungarian Catholic bishop

- Bishop of Nyitra
- Installed: 1183 or before
- Term ended: 1198/1204
- Predecessor: John I (1156)
- Successor: John II

Personal details
- Died: after 1198
- Denomination: Catholic Church

Everard (died after 1198) was a Hungarian Catholic prelate in the 12th century, who served as Bishop of Nyitra (today Nitra, Slovakia) at least from 1183 to 1198.

== Career ==
Everard or Eberhard is first mentioned as bishop in 1183. His last known predecessor John I held the dignity decades earlier, in 1156. Everard is the first Bishop of Nyitra, whose name appears among the list of dignitaries of a royal charter, when Béla III of Hungary donated portions of certain tolls bridge – Nyárhíd, today a borough of Nové Zámky, Slovakia and Zobor, today a borough of Nitra – and a share of three ship loads from the salt trade in Transylvania to the bishopric in 1183, citing the poverty of the diocese.

Under his episcopate, the Diocese of Nyitra gradually separated from the Archdiocese of Esztergom, forming an independent suffragan bishopric. Upon the cathedral chapter's request, Pope Lucius III confirmed the right of canons to collect tithe in three villages along the river Nyitra (Nitra) in 1183, which was previously taken by Lucas, Archbishop of Esztergom. According to the income register of Béla III of Hungary (compiled around 1185 or 1195), Everard's income was 300 Hungarian marks, with which he was thus the poorest prelate in Hungary, but the separate inclusion of the data already indicated his full political equality among the bishops. Upon the request of Everard, Pope Innocent III confirmed the possessions and privileges of the diocese in 1198, extending to properties to be acquired in the future. The pope forbade all other dioceses to collect tithes in the area of the bishopric of Nyitra.

A certain landowner called Nadas, who died without descendants, bequeathed a portion in Mita, Trencsén County to Everard and his diocese in his last will and testament. Everard is last mentioned as a living person in 1198. He was succeeded by John II, who is first mentioned in this capacity in 1204.

== Sources ==
- Koszta, László (2009). "A nyitrai püspökség létrejötte. (Nyitra egyháztörténete a 9-13. században) [The Emergence of the Bishopric of Nyitra. (Ecclesiastical History of Nyitra in the 9th to 13th Centuries)]". Századok (in Hungarian). 143 (2). Magyar Történelmi Társulat: 257–318. ISSN 0039-8098.
- Zsoldos, Attila (2011). Magyarország világi archontológiája, 1000–1301 [Secular Archontology of Hungary, 1000–1301] (in Hungarian). História, MTA Történettudományi Intézete. ISBN 978-963-9627-38-3.

Catholic Church titles
| Preceded by John I (?) | Bishop of Nyitra; 1183–1198 | Succeeded by John II |
