= Nicholas I (bishop of Nyitra) =

12th-century Hungarian Catholic bishop

Nicholas
- Bishop of Nyitra
- Installed: 1134 or before
- Term ended: 1134 or later
- Predecessor: Gervasius
- Successor: John (?)

Personal details
- Died: after 1134
- Denomination: Catholic Church

Nicholas (Hungarian: Miklós; died after 1134) was a Hungarian Catholic prelate in the 12th century, who served as Bishop of Nyitra (today Nitra, Slovakia) around 1134.

Nicholas was elected as bishop sometime after c. 1128, when his predecessor Gervasius is mentioned. Nicholas's episcopate is mentioned by a single source, a judgement letter of Felician, Archbishop of Esztergom from 1134. Accordingly, Nicholas acted as a judge of the archiepiscopal court in the lawsuit between the Diocese of Zagreb and local noblemen regarding the right of ownership over the Dubrava forest.

== Sources ==
- Koszta, László (2009). "A nyitrai püspökség létrejötte. (Nyitra egyháztörténete a 9-13. században) [The Emergence of the Bishopric of Nyitra. (Ecclesiastical History of Nyitra in the 9th to 13th Centuries)]". Századok (in Hungarian). 143 (2). Magyar Történelmi Társulat: 257–318. ISSN 0039-8098.
- Zsoldos, Attila (2011). Magyarország világi archontológiája, 1000–1301 [Secular Archontology of Hungary, 1000–1301] (in Hungarian). História, MTA Történettudományi Intézete. ISBN 978-963-9627-38-3.

Catholic Church titles
Preceded by Gervasius	Bishop of Nyitra fl. 1134	Succeeded by John (?)
