= Maňa =

Village and municipality in Slovakia

Maňa Mánya
- Municipality
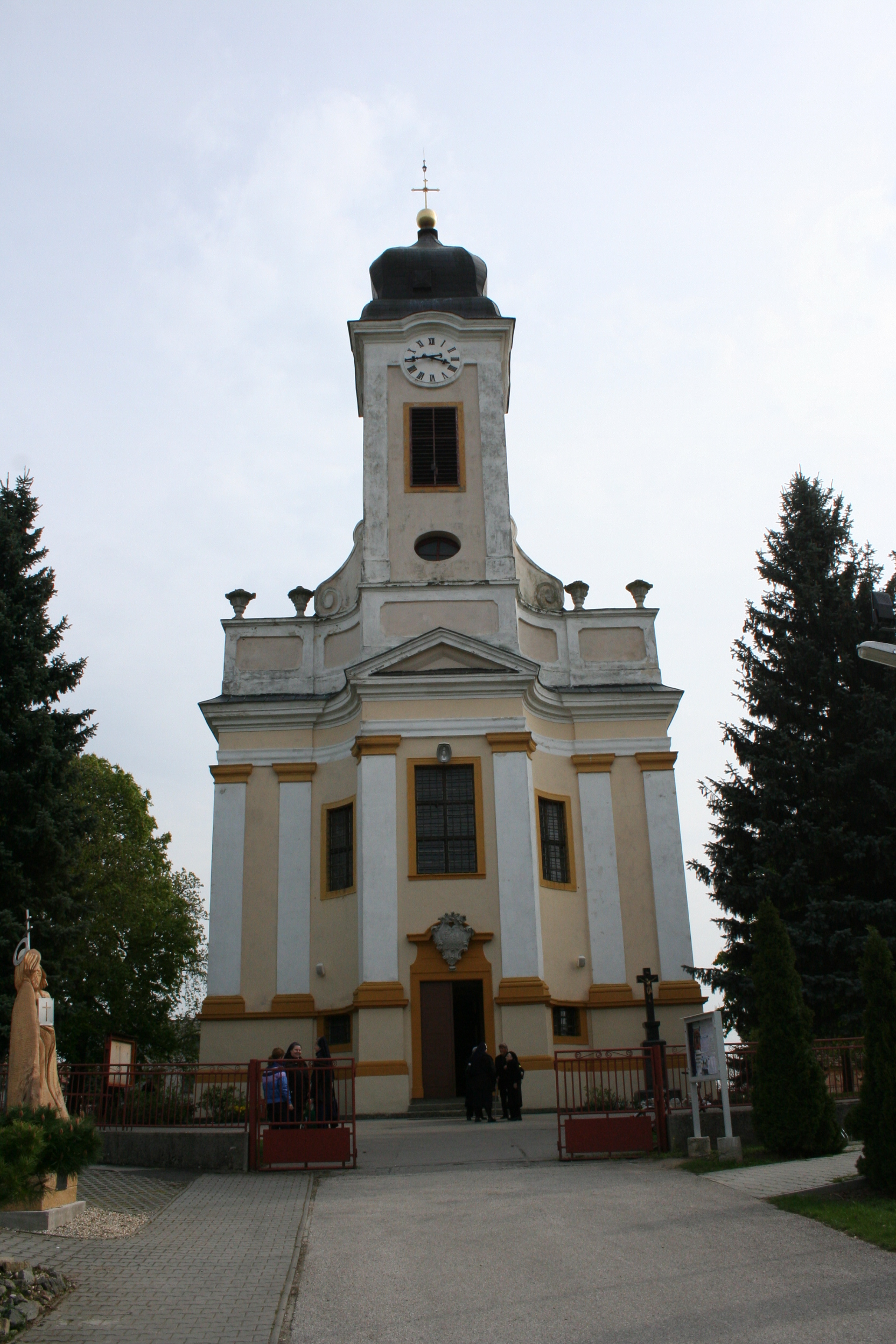
- Church of Our Lady of Seven Sorrows

- Flag

- Location of Maňa in the Nitra Region Location of Maňa in Slovakia
- Coordinates: 48.15°N 18.28°E
- Country: Slovakia
- Region: Nitra Region
- District: Nové Zámky District
- First mentioned: 1237

Area
  - Total: 21.59 km^{2} (8.34 sq mi)
- Elevation: 132 m (433 ft)

Population (2025)
  - Total: 1,946
- Time zone: UTC+1 (CET)
  - Summer (DST): UTC+2 (CEST)
- Postal code: 941 45
- Area code: +421 35
- Vehicle registration plate (until 2022): NZ
- Website: www.obecmana.sk

Maňa (Hungarian: Mánya) is a village and municipality in the Nové Zámky District in the Nitra Region of south-west Slovakia.

== History ==
In historical records the village was first mentioned in 1237.

== Geography ==
The municipality lies at an altitude of 132 metres (433 ft) and covers an area of 21.59 km^{2} (8.34 sq mi) (2025).

== Population ==
Population statistic (10 years)
Year	1995	2005	2015	2025
Count	2107	2073	2074	1946
Difference		−1.61%	+0.04%	−6.17%

Population statistic
Year	2024	2025
Count	1947	1946
Difference		−0.05%

It has a population of 1946 people (31 December 2025).

=== Ethnicity ===
Census 2021 (1+ %)
Ethnicity	Number	Fraction
Slovak	1925	96.05%
Not found out	59	2.94%
Total	2004	

In year 2021 was 2004 people by ethnicity 1925 as Slovak, 59 as Not found out, 13 as Romani, 13 as Other, 10 as Hungarian, 8 as Czech, 5 as Bulgarian, 3 as Polish, 2 as Greek, 1 as Serbian, 1 as Rusyn, 1 as Russian, 1 as Austrian, 1 as Croatian and 1 as Albanian.

Note on population: The difference values of population numbers in the table "Population statistic" and in the sections "Ethnicity" & "Religion" is caused by the use of various statistical methods.

=== Religion ===
Census 2021 (1+ %)
Religion	Number	Fraction
Roman Catholic Church	1644	82.04%
None	188	9.38%
Not found out	56	2.79%
Evangelical Church	45	2.25%
Total	2004	

In year 2021 was 2004 people by religion 1644 from Roman Catholic Church, 188 from None, 56 from Not found out, 45 from Evangelical Church, 14 from Eastern Orthodox Church, 8 from Calvinist Church, 8 from Other, 7 from Christian Congregations in Slovakia, 7 from Islam, 5 from Old Catholic Church, 5 from Greek Catholic Church, 4 from Other and not ascertained christian church, 4 from United Methodist Church, 4 from Ad hoc movements, 3 from Apostolic Church, 1 from Paganism and natural spirituality and 1 from Buddhism.

The population is about 98% Slovak.

== Facilities ==
The village has a public library and a gym.
