= Viliam Judák =

Bishops Judák coat of arms

Viliam Judák (born 9 November 1957 in Harvelka) is the diocesan Bishop of Nitra, Slovakia. He was a priest in Nitra, where he gained a Th.D. in 1991, and was then seminary rector of St. Gorazd in Nitra (1996–2001) and then dean of Comenius University in Bratislava (2001–2004). He is an academic with specialties in Christian antiquity and the medieval Slovak church history and is the author of several monographs in the field of church history, and many books, articles and publications. He speaks German and Italian.

He was ordained on 16 June 1985 in Nitra, and made bishop by Pope Benedict XVI on 9 June 2005. Since 2006, he has been the vice-president of the Slovak Bishops' Conference. Within the KBS he also acts as chairman of the Commission for the Clergy, Subcommittee for the permanent diaconate, music Subcommittee liturgical Commission and the council to history. On 10 October 2022, during 103rd plenary session of the Conference, Judák was elected the vice-president of the Conference under the presidency of Metropolitan Archbishop Bernard Bober.

He was awarded the Matica slovenská.

== Literary works ==
- Judák, Viliam. Archbishop holy life. (Bratislava Luc Episcopal Office in Nitra, 1992)
- Judák, Viliam. Calvary national saints. Illustrations Bebjak, Louis. (Nitra: Kňazský seminar St. Gorazd, 1996). ISBN 8088741122
- Judák, Viliam; Hank, Igor. By Gorazd to gorazdovcom. Obál. Norbert Pšenčík. (Nitra: Kňazský seminar St. Gorazd, 1994). ISBN 8088741076
- Judák, Viliam. Jubilee years in history. Translation Kostal, Anton. (Nitra: Kňazský seminar St. Gorazd, 1997.) ISBN 8088741181
- Judák, Viliam. The Bishopric of Nitra in history. Novotna, Marta (FOT). (Bratislava: Institute for State-Church Relations, 1999). ISBN 8096824651
- Judák, Viliam. Sv. Svorad – patron of the city of Nitra. (Nitra: Kňazský seminar St. Gorazd, 1999). ISBN 8088741289
- Judák, Viliam; Poláčik, Stefan. List patrocínií in Slovakia. Ed. Viliam Judák: Stefan Poláčik; Eva Benčíková resume translation. (Bratislava: Roman Catholic Theology Faculty, 2009). ISBN 9788096978731
- Judák, William, et al., Nitra Castle and Cathedral – Basilica of St. Emeráma. Illustration photo: Matej Plekanec, Vladimir Plekanec, Joseph Medvecký. (Nitra Bishop's Office, 2012). ISBN 9788097105754
