= Verbum (Slovak magazine) =

Verbum was a Slovak language magazine focused primarily on writings of the Catholic intelligentsia.

== History and profile ==
Verbum was founded in May 1946 at the parish in Liptovský Hrádok, by the Catholic modernist poet Janko Silan. The Magazine took contributions from the whole spectrum of Catholic intellectuals, many of whom were previously editors of journals prior to World War II. The most important contributors included:

- Ladislav Hanus,
- Joseph Kútnik,
- Cyril Dudas,
- Vendelín Jankovič

In addition, the magazine also created a publishing house Verbum, in Košice.

During its existence, the Verbum became very popular magazine, and could not manage to meet all orders. It had dedicated volumes that dealt with philosophy, art and one double issue was devoted to Protestantism. Verbum was instructed by communist officials to be destroyed in March 1948 (marked activity contributed Jozef Straka, among other things, arrest of Bishop John Vojtaššáka). Several contributors were arrested and spent many years in a communist prison.
