= Viliam Loviška =

Slovak sculptor

Viliam Loviška (born 12 August 1964 in Bratislava, Czechoslovakia) is a Slovak sculptor, painter, designer, educator and organiser of the cultural life.

== Study ==
He studied sculpture in the Studio of Juraj Gavula at the High School of the Art Industry in Bratislava in 1978–1982.

Further he continued his study at The Academy of Fine Arts and Design in Bratislava, Slovakia since 1982, where he studied in the Studio of Prof. Ladislav Snopek, Teodor Baník, and later in the Studio of Prof. Jan Kulich and Prof. Albín Brunovský.

Viliam graduated with the University master's degree "Academic Sculptor" in 1989.

== Scholarships ==
- 1991–1992 – A scholarship granted by The Pollock-Krasner Foundation, USA
- 1993 – A scholarship granted by the Society of Graphic Artists, Slovakia
- 1996 – A scholarship granted by Milan Galanda Foundation, Slovakia

== Works ==
Selection of the most important works:

- Stará Bystrica astronomical clock, Unique, to the geographical location, Astronomical Clock
- Brasília, Passa Quatro, General M. R. Štefánik (sculpture)
- USA, Washington, Gravestone of Stefan Osusky (artistic relief)
- Slovakia, Bratislava, City Part of Ruzinov, Church of St. Vincent de Paul, Interior design (art furniture parts)
- Slovakia, Bratislava, City Part of Ruzinov, Church of St. Vincent de Paul, Pietà (sculpture)
- Slovakia, Bratislava, City Part of Ruzinov, Superior Chapel, Interior (cooperation with architect Ivan Jarina)
- Slovakia, Nitra, Memorial to Unborn children (sculpture)
- Slovakia, Stara Bystrica, St. Michael Archangel (sculpture)
- Slovakia, Stara Bystrica, The Slovak Horologe, (cooperation with architect Ivan Jarina)
- Slovakia, Bratislava, The Integration Hill (cooperation with architect Ivan Jarina)
- Slovakia, Bratislava, BYZANT Gallery, Selection of smaller sculptures made from Levice Gold Onyx stone
- Slovakia, Bratislava, Galvaniho Business Centrum IV, Design and furnishment of exterior design components in the shape of

Viliam Loviška has created many of his works in close cooperation with his wife Marcela Lovišková, also respected Slovak sculptor, designer and educator. Their daughter Lea Lovišková is a professional photographer and her artistic works are accompanying many of their common art exhibitions.

== Activities ==
- 1990 – Founder of Visual Artists Association INAK (means DIFFERENTLY), founded as the reaction to the political and society changes after Velvet Revolution
- 1996–2006 – Educator at the University of Constantine Philosopher in Nitra, Slovakia as the Head of Sculpture Studio
- 2004 – Founder of the Fine Arts and Design Studio BYZANT together with his wife Marcela
- 2007 – Founder of BYZANT Gallery in the Count Zichy Palace, Bratislava, Slovakia –

Since 1989, Viliam Loviška has been exhibiting his works in domestic and international exhibitions (among others in Bratislava, Paris, Genève, Zagreb, Istanbul, Washington, New York, Vancouver, Vienna, Munich etc.).
