= Benedict of Skalka =

Hungarian Benedictine monk and saint

Saint Benedict of Skalka
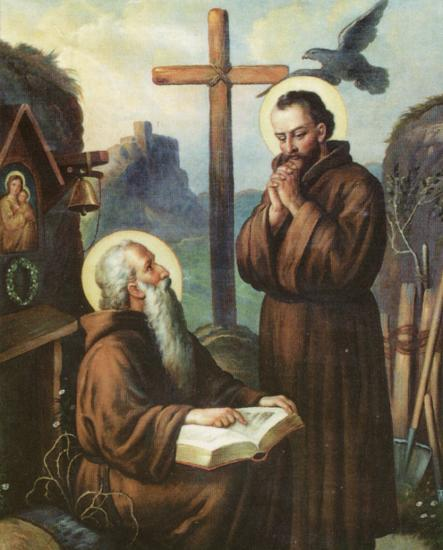
- St. Benedict of Skalka and St. Andrew Zorard
- Born: 10th century Nitra, Kingdom of Hungary (modern day: Slovakia)
- Died: 1012; Zobor Mountain near Nitra, Kingdom of Hungary (modern day: Slovakia)
- Venerated in: Catholic Church; Eastern Orthodox Church
- Canonized: 1083 or 1085 by Pope Gregory VII
- Major shrine: St. Emmeram's Cathedral
- Feast: 1 May; 13 June or 17 July on some calendars
- Patronage: Sailors of the Váh River, Diocese of Nitra, Diocese of Tarnów, St. Andrew Abbey in Cleveland, Ss. Andrew & Benedict in Detroit

Benedict of Skalka or Szkalka (Hungarian: Zoborhegyi Szent Benedek, Slovak: Svätý Benedikt pustovník) (10th century–1012), born in Nitra, in the Grand Principality of Hungary, was a Benedictine monk. He was canonized in 1083 and is venerated as a saint. He became a hermit and lived an austere life in a cave along the Váh River. In 1012, he was strangled to death by a group of robbers searching for treasure.

He is venerated in Hungary, Poland, Slovakia, and among emigrant diasporas in the United States.

== Life ==
Benedict became a monk at the St. Hippolytus Monastery on Mount Zobor near Nyitra, in medieval Hungary (now Nitra, Slovakia) in the late 10th or early 11th century. During the reign of King Saint Stephen of Hungary, he later became a hermit with his fellow saint and spiritual teacher Andrew Zorard. They lived an austere life in a cave along the Váh River near Trencsén (now Trenčín, Slovakia) in modern Skalka nad Váhom.

Andrew died in 1009, but Benedict continued to live in the cave for three years until he was strangled to death in 1012 by a gang of robbers looking for treasure. The thieves dumped his body in the Váh River, but his body was found perfectly preserved a year later. In 1083 his relics were translated to the St. Emmeram's Cathedral in Nitra where they remain to this day. A biography of Benedict and Andrew was written by Maurus, Bishop of Pécs.

He was renowned for his piety and strict asceticism.

== Feast Day and Veneration ==
Benedict is venerated especially in Hungary, Poland and Slovakia, but also in the United States. His feast day is 1 May, but in some calendars he is venerated together with Andrew Zorard on 13 June or 17 July.

== See also ==
- Saint Benedict of Szkalka, patron saint archive
