= Hajná Nová Ves =

Municipality in Nitra Region, Slovakia

Hajná Nová Ves Szeptencújfalu
- Municipality
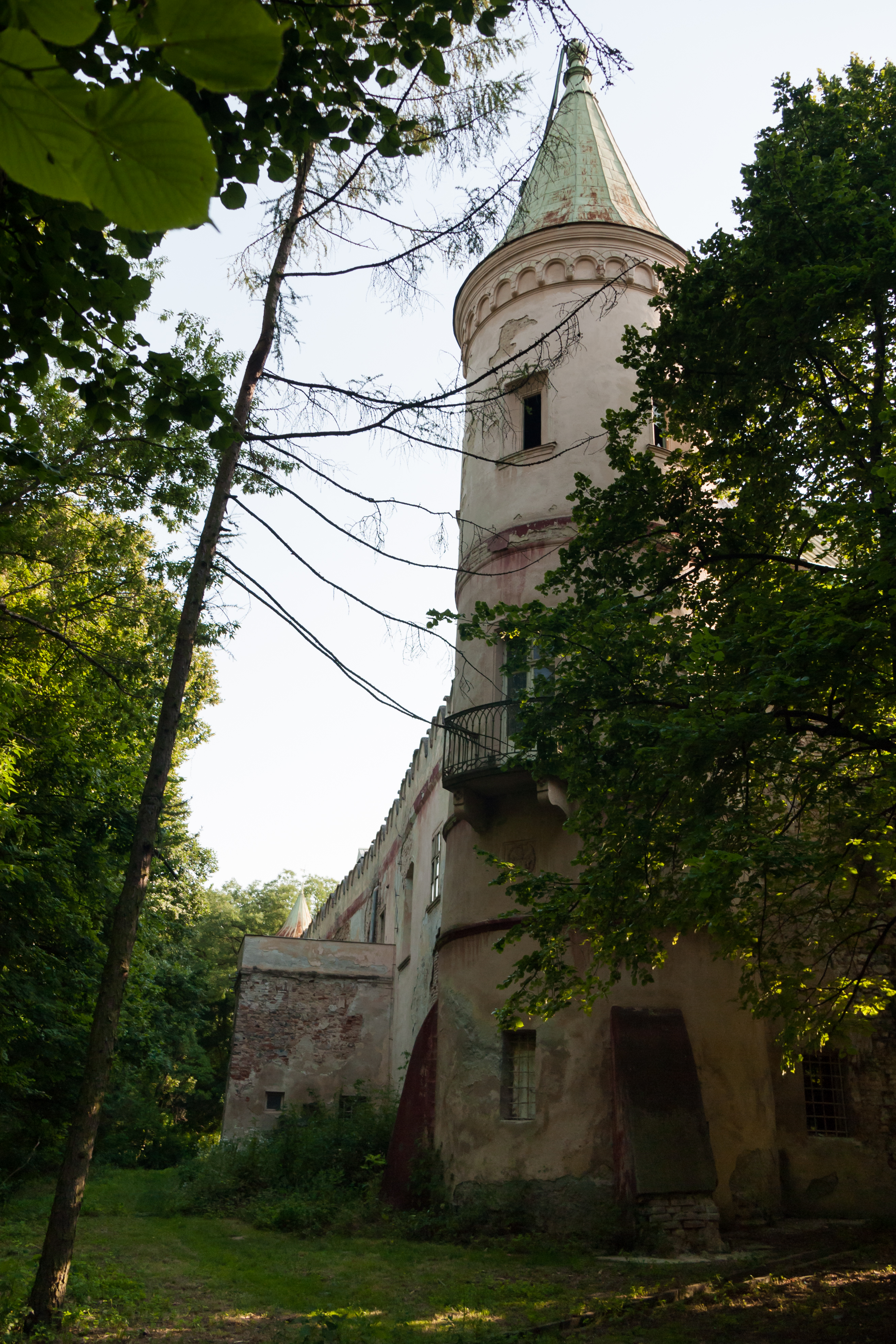

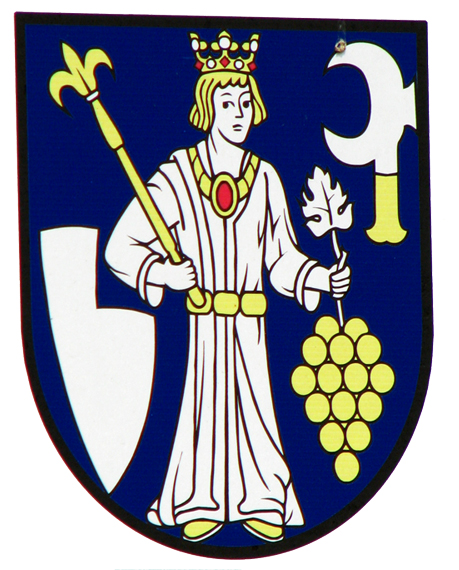
- Flag Coat of arms

- Location of Hajná Nová Ves in the Nitra Region Location of Hajná Nová Ves in Slovakia
- Coordinates: 48.53°N 18.03°E
- Country: Slovakia
- Region: Nitra Region
- District: Topoľčany District
- First mentioned: 1358

Area
  - Total: 6.37 km^{2} (2.46 sq mi)
- Elevation: 197 m (646 ft)

Population (2025)
  - Total: 350
- Time zone: UTC+1 (CET)
  - Summer (DST): UTC+2 (CEST)
- Postal code: 956 03
- Area code: +421 38
- Vehicle registration plate (until 2022): TO
- Website: www.hajnanovaves.sk

Hajná Nová Ves (Hungarian: Szeptencújfalu) is a municipality in the Topoľčany District of the Nitra Region, Slovakia. In 2011 had 332 inhabitants.

== See also ==
- List of municipalities and towns in Slovakia

== Geography ==
The municipality lies at an altitude of 197 metres (646 ft) and covers an area of 6.37 km^{2} (2.46 sq mi) (2025).

== Population ==
Population statistic (10 years)
Year	1995	2005	2015	2025
Count	349	340	328	350
Difference		−2.57%	−3.52%	+6.70%

Population statistic
Year	2024	2025
Count	347	350
Difference		+0.86%

It has a population of 350 people (31 December 2025).

=== Ethnicity ===
Census 2021 (1+ %)
Ethnicity	Number	Fraction
Slovak	328	96.47%
Not found out	9	2.64%
Czech	4	1.17%
Total	340	

In year 2021 was 340 people by ethnicity 328 as Slovak, 9 as Not found out, 4 as Czech, 1 as Romanian, 1 as German and 1 as Hungarian.

Note on population: The difference values of population numbers in the table "Population statistic" and in the sections "Ethnicity" & "Religion" is caused by the use of various statistical methods.

=== Religion ===
Census 2021 (1+ %)
Religion	Number	Fraction
Roman Catholic Church	255	75%
None	37	10.88%
Evangelical Church	24	7.06%
Not found out	12	3.53%
Greek Catholic Church	4	1.18%
Total	340	

In year 2021 was 340 people by religion 255 from Roman Catholic Church, 37 from None, 24 from Evangelical Church, 12 from Not found out, 4 from Greek Catholic Church, 2 from Calvinist Church, 2 from Christian Congregations in Slovakia, 2 from Ad hoc movements, 1 from United Methodist Church and 1 from Baptists Church.

== Genealogical resources ==
The records for genealogical research are available at the state archive "Statny Archiv in Nitra, Slovakia"

- Roman Catholic church records (births/marriages/deaths): 1721-1895 (parish B)
- Lutheran church records (births/marriages/deaths): 1708-1895 (parish B)
