= Vilmos Batthyány =

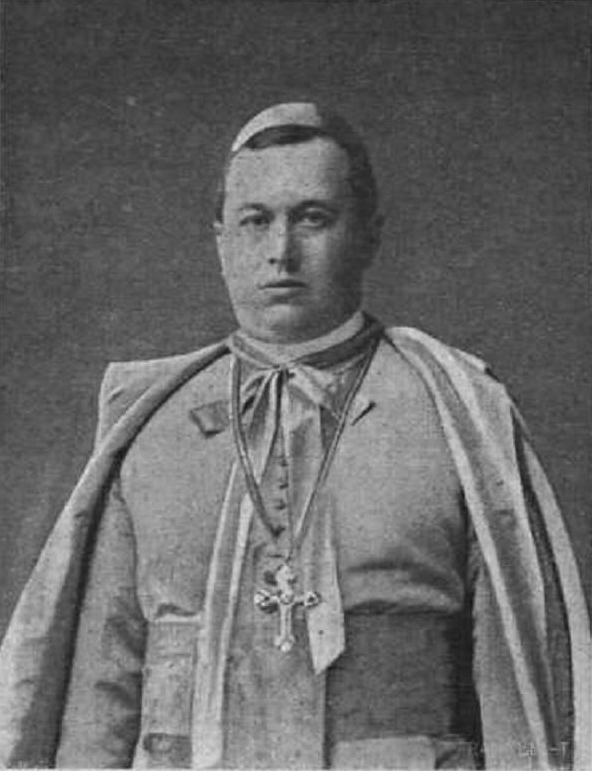
Batthyány in 1911

Count Vilmos Batthyány (Slovak: Viliam Baťán; 14 March 1870 – 24 November 1923) was a canonist and the last Hungarian bishop of Nyitra. He was expelled from his diocese by the Czechoslovak authorities in 1919.

== Life ==
Batthyány was born on 14 March 1870 in Zalaszentgrót, Kingdom of Hungary. The son of Count Zsigmond Batthyány de Németújvár and Countess Johanna Erdődy, he was member of the Batthyány family, one of the most important aristocratic families of the Kingdom of Hungary. His full name was Count Vilmos Mária Gobert Tivadar Batthyány de Németújvár.

He studied philosophy and theology in Budapest and at the University of Innsbruck and was ordained a priest in 1894. In 1896, he entered the Pontifical Academy of Noble Ecclesiastics in Rome, where he trained for the papal diplomatic service. He later received a doctorate in canon law. In 1900, he became a canon of the cathedral chapter of Nitra. In 1904, he was appointed coadjutor bishop to the elderly Bishop Imre Bende, with the right of succession. He assumed the administration of the diocese in 1910 and succeeded Bende as Bishop of Nitra upon the latter's death in 1911.

Nitra was occupied by Czechoslovak troops on 10 December 1918 and subsequently became part of Czechoslovakia. In early March 1919, Bishop Batthyány issued a pastoral circular forbidding the priests of his diocese from attending a clergy conference in Žilina, and declared the conference's decisions invalid. As a result, the Czechoslovak authorities forced him to leave the country. They cited his circular opposing the Žilina conference, his continued use of Hungarian in diocesan correspondence, and his contacts with the Hungarian government as reasons for his expulsion. On 26 March, Batthyány was informed of the government's accusations at the episcopal palace, which he rejected. Later that day, a Czech captain delivered an order from Vavro Šrobár requiring him to leave Czechoslovakia within 24 hours, under threat of forcible removal.

Batthyány left to Hungary the following day, but formally remained the bishop of Nitra. On 16 December 1920, as part of a settlement between the Holy See and the Czechoslovak government, he resigned his see. Pope Benedict XV subsequently appointed him titular Archbishop of Cyrrhus.

Batthyány settled in Budapest, where he participated in the capital's social life and church ceremonies. He died unexpectedly in Körmend from influenza-related pneumonia on 24 November 1923.
