= Veľké Držkovce =

- Municipality
- Flag

- Location of Veľké Držkovce in the Trenčín Region Location of Veľké Držkovce in Slovakia
- Coordinates: 48.73°N 18.18°E
- Country: Slovakia
- Region: Trenčín Region
- District: Bánovce nad Bebravou District
- First mentioned: 1400

Area
  - Total: 12.78 km^{2} (4.93 sq mi)
- Elevation: 239 m (784 ft)

Population (2025)
  - Total: 630
- Time zone: UTC+1 (CET)
  - Summer (DST): UTC+2 (CEST)
- Postal code: 956 54
- Area code: +421 38
- Vehicle registration plate (until 2022): BN
- Website: www.velkedrzkovce.sk

Veľké Držkovce (Hungarian: Nagydraskóc) is a village and municipality in Bánovce nad Bebravou District in the Trenčín Region of north-western Slovakia.

== History ==
In historical records the village was first mentioned in 1400.

== Geography ==
The municipality lies at an altitude of 239 metres (784 ft) and covers an area of 12.78 km^{2} (4.93 sq mi) (2025).

== Population ==
Population statistic (10 years)
Year	1995	2005	2015	2025
Count	682	653	653	630
Difference		−4.25%	+0%	−3.52%

Population statistic
Year	2024	2025
Count	637	630
Difference		−1.09%

It has a population of 630 people (31 December 2025).

=== Ethnicity ===
Census 2021 (1+ %)
Ethnicity	Number	Fraction
Slovak	668	98.23%
Not found out	9	1.32%
Total	680	

In year 2021 was 680 people by ethnicity 668 as Slovak, 9 as Not found out, 5 as Czech, 4 as English, 2 as Russian, 2 as Other and 1 as Canadian.

Note on population: The difference values of population numbers in the table "Population statistic" and in the sections "Ethnicity" & "Religion" is caused by the use of various statistical methods.

=== Religion ===
Census 2021 (1+ %)
Religion	Number	Fraction
Roman Catholic Church	552	81.18%
None	93	13.68%
Not found out	11	1.62%
Total	680	

In year 2021 was 680 people by religion 552 from Roman Catholic Church, 93 from None, 11 from Not found out, 6 from Evangelical Church, 6 from Seventh-day Adventist Church, 5 from Greek Catholic Church, 2 from Other, 2 from Ad hoc movements, 1 from Calvinist Church, 1 from Christian Congregations in Slovakia and 1 from Islam.
