= Viliame =

Viliame is both a masculine given name and a surname. It may refer to:

== Given name ==
- Viliame Cavubati (born 1945), Fijian politician
- Viliame Iongi (born 1989), Tongan rugby union player
- Viliame Kikau (born 1995). Fijian rugby league player
- Viliame Naupoto, Fijian Navy commander and civil servant
- Viliame Navoka (died 2007), Fijian diplomat
- Viliame Satala (born 1972), Fijian rugby union player
- Viliame Seruvakula, Fijian military officer
- Viliame Veikoso (born 1982), Fijian rugby union player
- Viliame Waqaseduadua (born 1983), New Zealand rugby union player

== Surname ==
- Savu Viliame (1906–1986), Fijian cricketer
