= Gorazd =

The name Gorazd is a traditional Slavic given name derived from the Proto-Slavic word гораздъ, meaning "skilful," "capable," "experienced," or "sensible".

Notable people with the given name include:

- Saint Gorazd, a disciple of Cyril and Methodius
- Gorazd Hiti (born 1948), Slovene ice hockey player
- Gorazd Kocijančič (born 1964), Slovene philosopher, poet and translator
- Gorazd Mihajlov (born 1974), Macedonian football coach and former football player
- Gorazd Pavlík (1879–1942), Czech bishop, hieromartyr and saint
- Gorazd Sotler (1930–1987), Slovene sculptor
- Gorazd Zajc (born 1987), Slovene footballer
- Gorazd Škof (born 1977), Slovene handball player
- Gorazd Štangelj (born 1973), Slovene road bicycle racer
- Franček Gorazd Tiršek (born 1975), Slovene sport shooter
