= Diocese of Nitra =

Diocese of the Catholic Church in Slovakia

Coordinates: 48°19′06″N 18°05′14″E

Diocese of Nitra Dioecesis Nitriensis Biskupstvo Nitra

Catholic
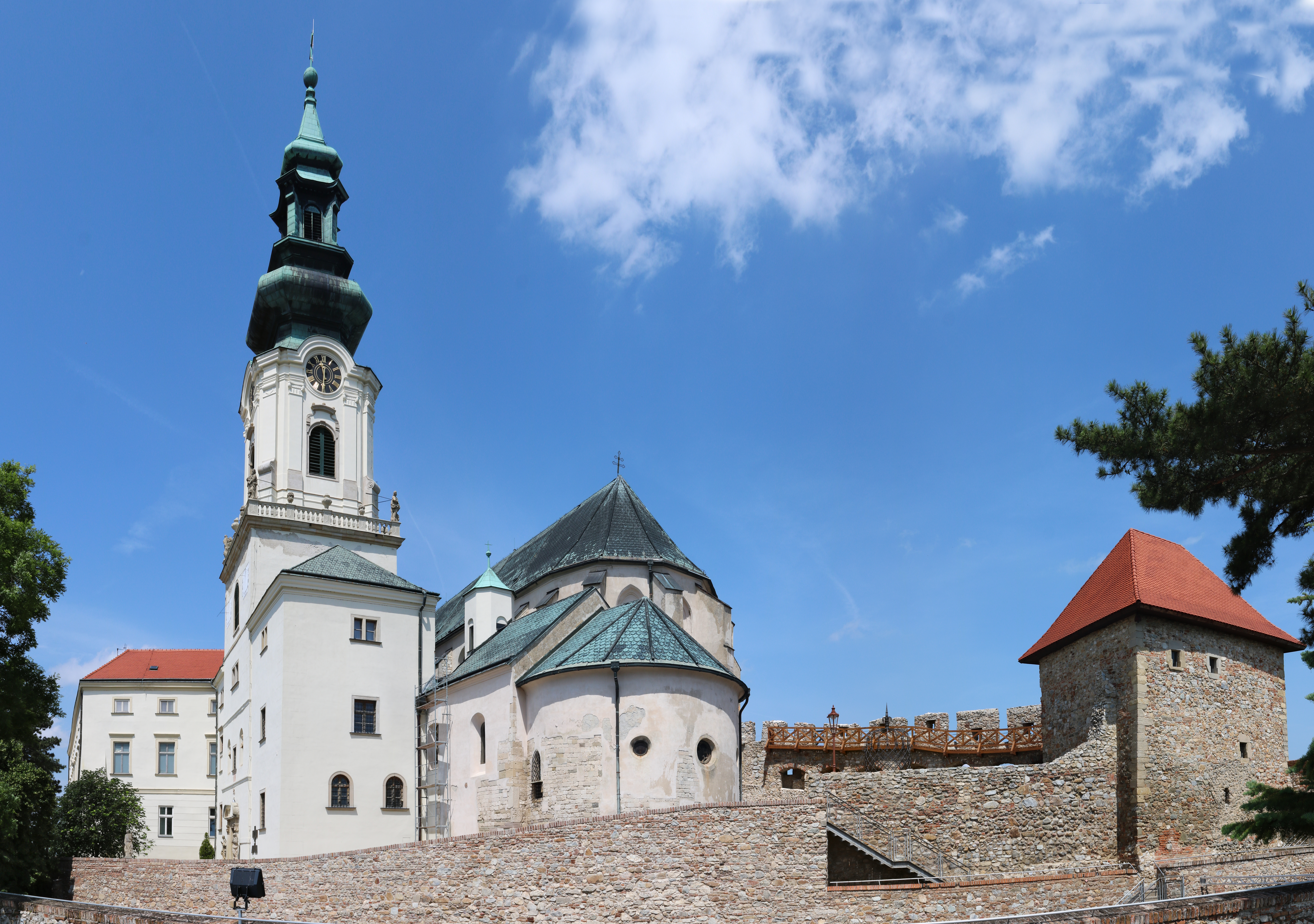
- St. Emmeram's Cathedral in Nitra.

- Coat of arms

Location
- Country: Slovakia
- Territory: Nitra Region, parts of the Trenčín Region
- Ecclesiastical province: Bratislava

Statistics
- Area: 5,932 km^{2} (2,290 sq mi)
- Population: Total; Catholics: (as of 2020); 684,604; ▲570,135 (▲83.3%)

Information
- Denomination: Roman Catholic
- Sui iuris church: Latin Church
- Rite: Roman Rite
- Established: June 880
- Cathedral: St. Emmeram's Cathedral in Nitra

Current leadership
- Pope: Leo XIV
- Bishop: Viliam Judák
- Metropolitan Archbishop: Stanislav Zvolenský
- Auxiliary Bishops: Peter Beňo

Map
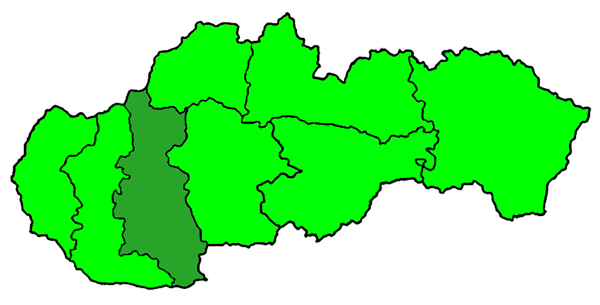
- Map of the Diocese

Website
- biskupstvo-nitra.sk

The Diocese of Nitra (Slovak: Nitrianska diecéza; Latin: Dioecesis Nitriensis; Hungarian: Nyitrai egyházmegye) is a Latin Church diocese of the Catholic Church in western Slovakia, with its seat in Nitra. As of 2020, the bishop is Viliam Judák.

== History ==
The diocese was created as the first one on the territory of present-day Slovakia around 880 (from the Diocese of Regensburg), during the time of Great Moravia. Its first bishop was the Saint Methodius. Its destiny after the fall of Great Moravia isn't known.

It was re-established in 1105 as part of the ecclesiastical province of Esztergom in the Kingdom of Hungary. In 1977, it was taken from the province of the Archdiocese of Esztergom and attached into the newly established province of Trnava (later renamed Bratislava-Trnava, now Bratislava). Before the reorganization in 2008, it was situated in the western parts of the Trenčín and Žilina regions (basically the former Trencsén County) with a strip connecting it to the city of Nitra. It had an area of 5,321 km^{2} and a population of that area was 838,861 of which around 84% were of Catholic faith (2004).

On 14 February 2008, the territory of the diocese was reorganized. The diocese lost northern parts to the newly created Diocese of Žilina, but gained territory around the "strip" and southern parts from the Archdiocese of Bratislava-Trnava.

== Bishops through 1892 ==
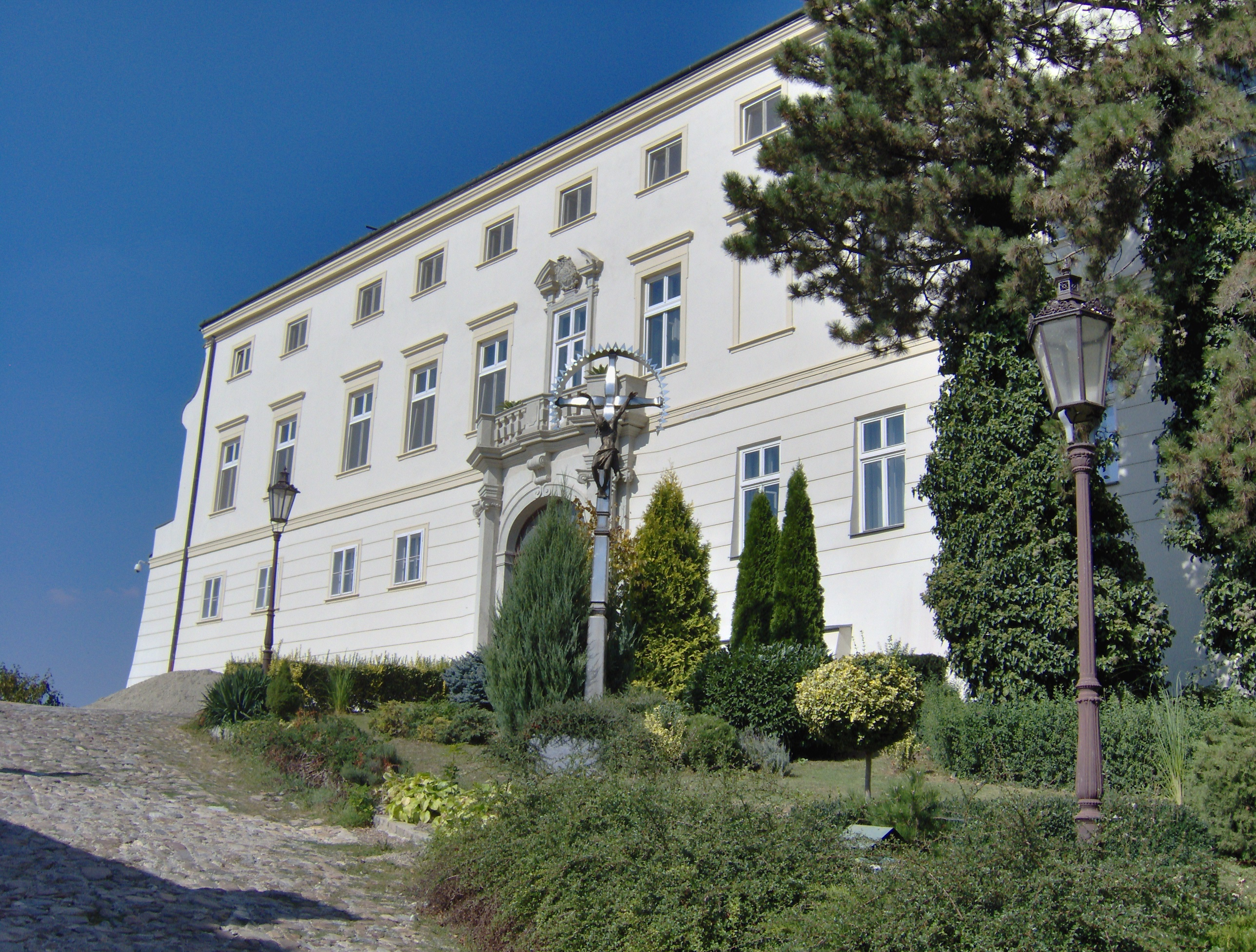
Bishops Palace.

- Saint Methodius of Thessaloniki
- Wiching (880–891)
- Anonymus (900–906) (?)
- Saint Bystrík (?1005—1046)
- Gerváz (1106)
- I. Miklós (1133)
- Pál (Savol) (1137)
- I. János (1156)
- I. Tamás (1165)
- Edvárd (1168–1198)
- II. János (1204)
- I. Vince (1220–1222)
- I. Jakab (1223–1240)
- I. Ádám (1241)
- Bartolomäus (1242–1243)
- II. Ádám (1244–1252)
- II. Miklós (1253–1255)
- II. Vince (1255–1272)
- I. Fülöp (1272)
- I. Péter (1279–1281)
- Pascház (1281–1297)
- III. János (1302–1328)
- Mieszko of Bytom (1328–1334)
- Vasvári Vid (Vitus de Castroferreo) (1334–1347)
- III. Miklós Vásári (1347–1348)
- Nicholas Apáti (1349)
- I. István de Insula (Szigeti) (1350–1367)
- I. László de Demjen (Demjéni) (1367–1372)
- Domonkos de Novoloco (Újhelyi) (1373–1384)
- I. Dömötör (1387–1388)
- I. Gergely (1388–1392)
- II. Mihály de Hédervári (1393–1399)
- II. Péter Poliak (Polonus) (1399–1403)
- Hinco (1404—1427)
- I. György Berzeviczy (1429–1437)
- Dénes Szécsi de Felsőlendva (1438–1439)
- II. László Csetneki (1440–1447)
- IV. Miklós (1448–1456)
- Albert Hangács Vétesi (1458–1459)
- Illés (1460–1463)
- II. Tamás Debrenthei (1463–1480)
- II. Gergely (1484–1492)
- I. Antal Sánkfalvi (1493–1501)
- V. Miklós Bácskai (1501–1503)
- Zsigmond Thurzó (4 August 1503 - 15 November 1504)
- II. István Podmanický (1505–1530)
- I. Ferenc Thuróo (1534–1557)
- Pál Abstemius-Bornemissza (1557–1579)
- Zakariás Mossóczy (1582–1587)
- III. István Fejérkövy (1587–1596)
- Ferenc Forgách (1596–1607)
- István Szuhay (1607 - 9 June 1608)
- Bálint Lépes (1608–1619)
- János Telegdy (1619–1624)
- V. István Bosnyák (1644)
- V. János Püsky (1645–1648)
- II. György Szelepcsényi (1648–1666)
- Leopold Karl von Kollonitsch (1666–1669)
- III. Tamás Pálffy (1669–1679)
- János Gubasóczy (1679–1685)
- III. Péter Korompay (1686–1690)
- II. Jakab Haskó (1690–1691)
- I. Balázs Jáklin (1691–1695)
- III. László Mattyasovszky (1696–1705)
- IV. Count László Ádám Erdödi de Monyorókerék (1706–1736)
- János Ernő Harrach (1738–1739)
- I. Count Imre Gábor Esterházy de Galántha (1740–1763)
- János Gusztínyi-Zubralovszky (1 January 1764 - 31 January 1777)
- Antal Révai (1780–1783)
- Ferenc Xavér Fuchs (1787–1804)
- József Kluch (1808–1826)
- József Vurum (1827–1838)
- Imre Palugyay (1838 - 27 July 1858)
- Ágoston Roskoványi (1859–1892)

== Recent bishops ==
=== Imre Bende ===
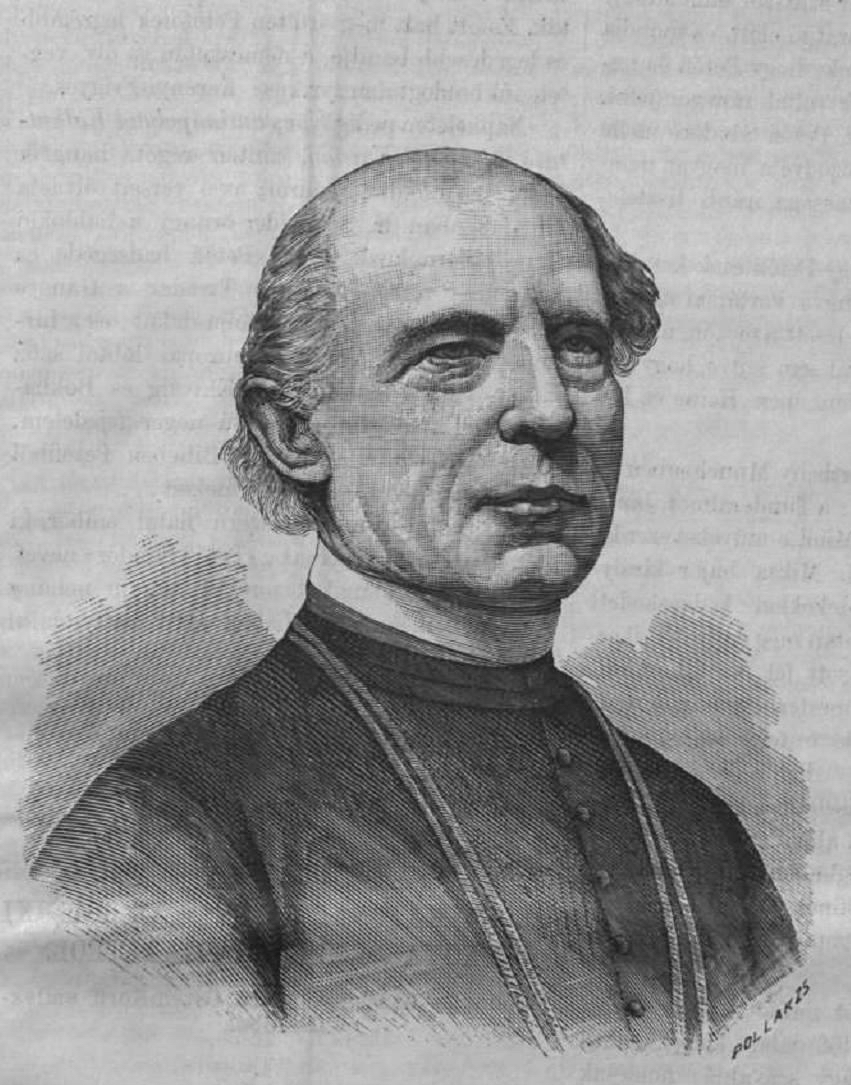
Bende Imre

Bishop Imre Bende (born 28 August 1824, Baja, Hungary; died 26 March 1911, Nitra) was a religious writer and Roman Catholic Bishop of Banská Bystrica in 1887, then Bishop of Nitra in 1893. He studied theology at the University of Vienna and in 1847 in Kalocsa ordained a priest. In 1869 he became a priest in Novi Sad. Between 1878 and 1884 he was elected official in the Hungarian Parliament, for the Hungarian Liberal Party.

=== Vilmos Batthyány ===
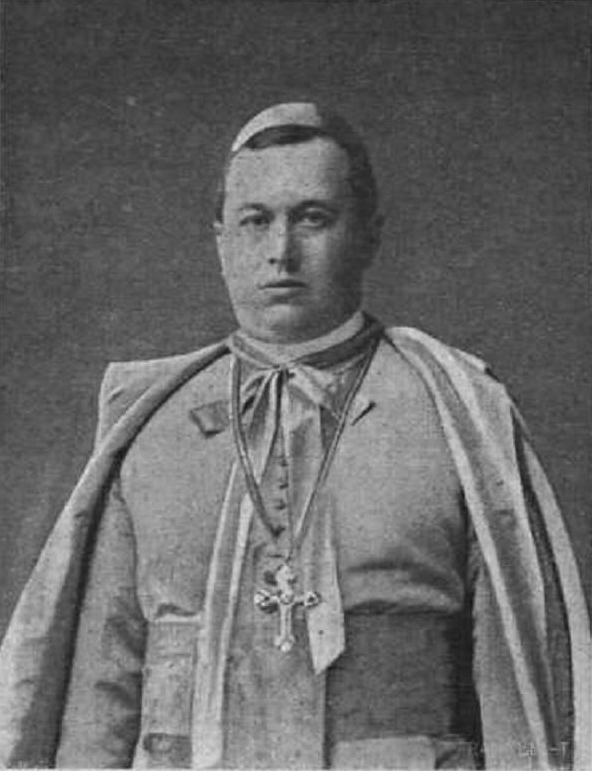
Batthyány Vilmos

Vilmos Batthyány (born 14 March 1870, Zalaszentgrót, Kingdom of Hungary; died 24 November 1923, Körmend, Hungary) was the last Hungarian bishop of Nitra. A member of the aristocratic Batthyány family, and a canon lawyer, he was appointed coadjutor bishop to the elderly Bishop Imre Bende in 1904, with the right of succession. He assumed the administration of the diocese in 1910 and succeeded Bende as bishop upon the latter’s death in 1911.

When Nitra was occupied by Czechoslovak troops on 10 December 1918, his position soon became untenable. On 26 March 1919, Batthyány was informed of the new government’s accusations against him at the episcopal palace. Later that day, a Czech captain delivered an order from Vavro Šrobár requiring him to leave Czechoslovakia within 24 hours, under threat of forcible removal.

Batthyány left to Hungary the following day, but formally remained the Bishop of Nitra. On 16 December 1920, as part of a settlement between the Holy See and the Czechoslovak government, he resigned his see.

=== Karol Kmeťko ===
Karol Kmeťko (born 12 December 1875, Dolné Držkovce; died 22 December 1948, Nitra) was a Roman Catholic cleric, Bishop of Nitra, and the author of religious books and articles.

After the collapse of the Austro-Hungarian Monarchy, the Hungarian Bishop of Nitra, Vilmos Batthyány was expelled from Czechoslovakia. After his resignation, Pope Benedict XV appointed Karol Kmeťko as his successor on 16 December 1920. On 11 May 1944 Pope Pius XII appointed him Archbishop ad personam.

Karol Kmeťko was previously one of the signatories of the Martin Declaration of 30 October 1918. From 1918 to 1920 he was a member of the Revolutionary National Assembly, in 1920 he became a Member of the National Assembly. On its mandate, he resigned in 1922 after assuming the functions of a bishop.

=== Eduard Nécsey ===
Dr. Eduard Nécsey (born 9 February 1892, Oslany; died 19 June 1968, Nitra) was a Roman Catholic cleric, Titular Archbishop and Apostolic Administrator of the diocese of Nitra. Studied and ordained at Innsbruck In 1943 he was appointed Auxiliary Bishop of the Diocese of Nitra and was consecrated in Nitra on 16 May 1943. He defended his appointment to the communist regime and latter attended Vatican II; he died in Nitra in 1968.

=== Ján Pásztor ===
Ján Pásztor (born 27 January 1912, Prievidza – died 8 November 1988) Educated in his native Prievidza. He studied theology in Nitra seminary and at the Charles University. Ordination in 1934 at Nitra parish and further studytill WW2. A doctorate in theology at Charles University (1937) Law at University of Bratislava (1942). He became a priest in Dubnica in 1947 and In 1950 he was interned in a camp at Močenku and in 1953 imprisoned. After his release he worked as a parish administrator till 1961 and as till 1967. Pope Paul VI appointed him consultor of the Roman Commission for the revision of the Church's Code (1968), and he later became the capitular vicar. In the 1960s he negotiated between the Czech government and the Vatican, and in 1973 he was appointed Bishop of Nitra.

=== Ján Chryzostom Korec ===
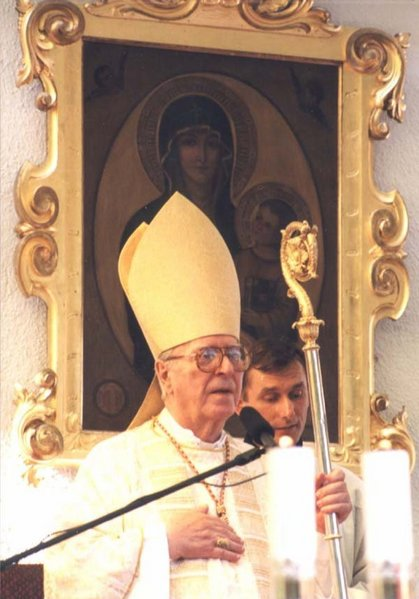
Ján Chryzostom Korec

Ján Chryzostom Korec; born 22 January 1924; died 24 October 2015.
He was ordained in 1950, and named a bishop in 1951 (at 27, and was consecrated clandestinely). On 6 February 1990, he was appointed Bishop of Nitra (Cardinal in 1991); retired 9 June 2005.

=== Viliam Judák ===
Viliam Judák is the current bishop.
