= Skalka nad Váhom =

- Municipality
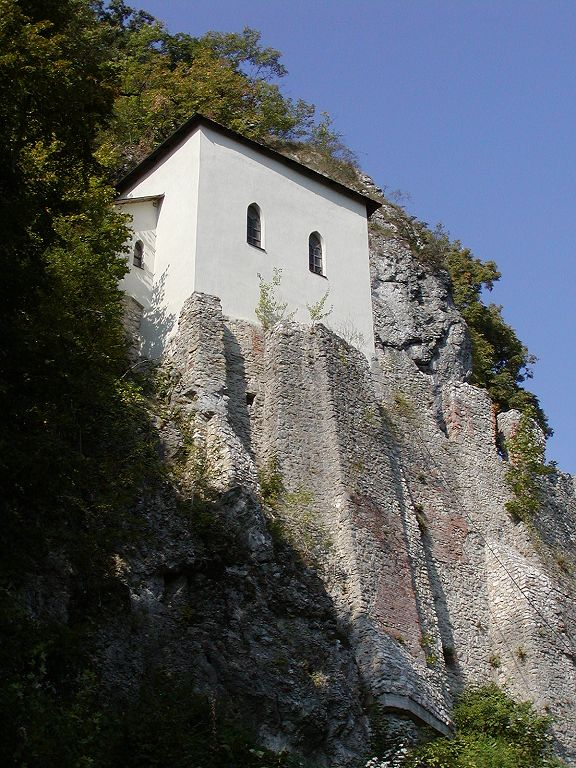

- Flag

- Location of Skalka nad Váhom in the Trenčín Region Location of Skalka nad Váhom in Slovakia
- Coordinates: 48.93°N 18.07°E
- Country: Slovakia
- Region: Trenčín Region
- District: Trenčín District
- First mentioned: 1208

Area
  - Total: 8.68 km^{2} (3.35 sq mi)
- Elevation: 218 m (715 ft)

Population (2025)
  - Total: 1,318
- Time zone: UTC+1 (CET)
  - Summer (DST): UTC+2 (CEST)
- Postal code: 913 31
- Area code: +421 32
- Vehicle registration plate (until 2022): TN
- Website: www.skalkanadvahom.sk

Skalka nad Váhom (Hungarian: Vágsziklás) is a village and municipality in Trenčín District in the Trenčín Region of north-western Slovakia.

== History ==
In historical records the village was first mentioned in 1208.

== Geography ==
The municipality lies at an altitude of 218 metres (715 ft) and covers an area of 8.68 km^{2} (3.35 sq mi) (2025).

== Population ==
Population statistic (10 years)
| Year | 1995 | 2005 | 2015 | 2025 |
|---|---|---|---|---|
| Count | 967 | 1100 | 1173 | 1318 |
| Difference | | +13.75% | +6.63% | +12.36% |

Population statistic
| Year | 2024 | 2025 |
|---|---|---|
| Count | 1278 | 1318 |
| Difference | | +3.12% |

It has a population of 1318 people (31 December 2025).

=== Ethnicity ===
Census 2021 (1+ %)
| Ethnicity | Number | Fraction |
|---|---|---|
| Slovak | 1138 | 97.59% |
| Not found out | 17 | 1.45% |
| Czech | 12 | 1.02% |
| Total | 1166 | |

In year 2021 was 1166 people by ethnicity 1138 as Slovak, 17 as Not found out, 12 as Czech, 5 as Other, 4 as Irish, 4 as Rusyn, 4 as Hungarian, 2 as Romani, 1 as Russian, 1 as Romanian and 1 as French.

Note on population: The difference values of population numbers in the table "Population statistic" and in the sections "Ethnicity" & "Religion" is caused by the use of various statistical methods.

=== Religion ===
Census 2021 (1+ %)
| Religion | Number | Fraction |
|---|---|---|
| Roman Catholic Church | 918 | 78.73% |
| None | 182 | 15.61% |
| Not found out | 21 | 1.8% |
| Evangelical Church | 15 | 1.29% |
| Total | 1166 | |

In year 2021 was 1166 people by religion 918 from Roman Catholic Church, 182 from None, 21 from Not found out, 15 from Evangelical Church, 6 from Greek Catholic Church, 5 from Other and not ascertained christian church, 4 from Eastern Orthodox Church, 3 from Buddhism, 3 from Ad hoc movements, 2 from Calvinist Church, 2 from Paganism and natural spirituality, 2 from Christian Congregations in Slovakia, 2 from Other and 1 from United Methodist Church.
