= St. Emmeram's Cathedral, Nitra =

Cathedral of St Emmeram
- Katedrála svätého Emeráma
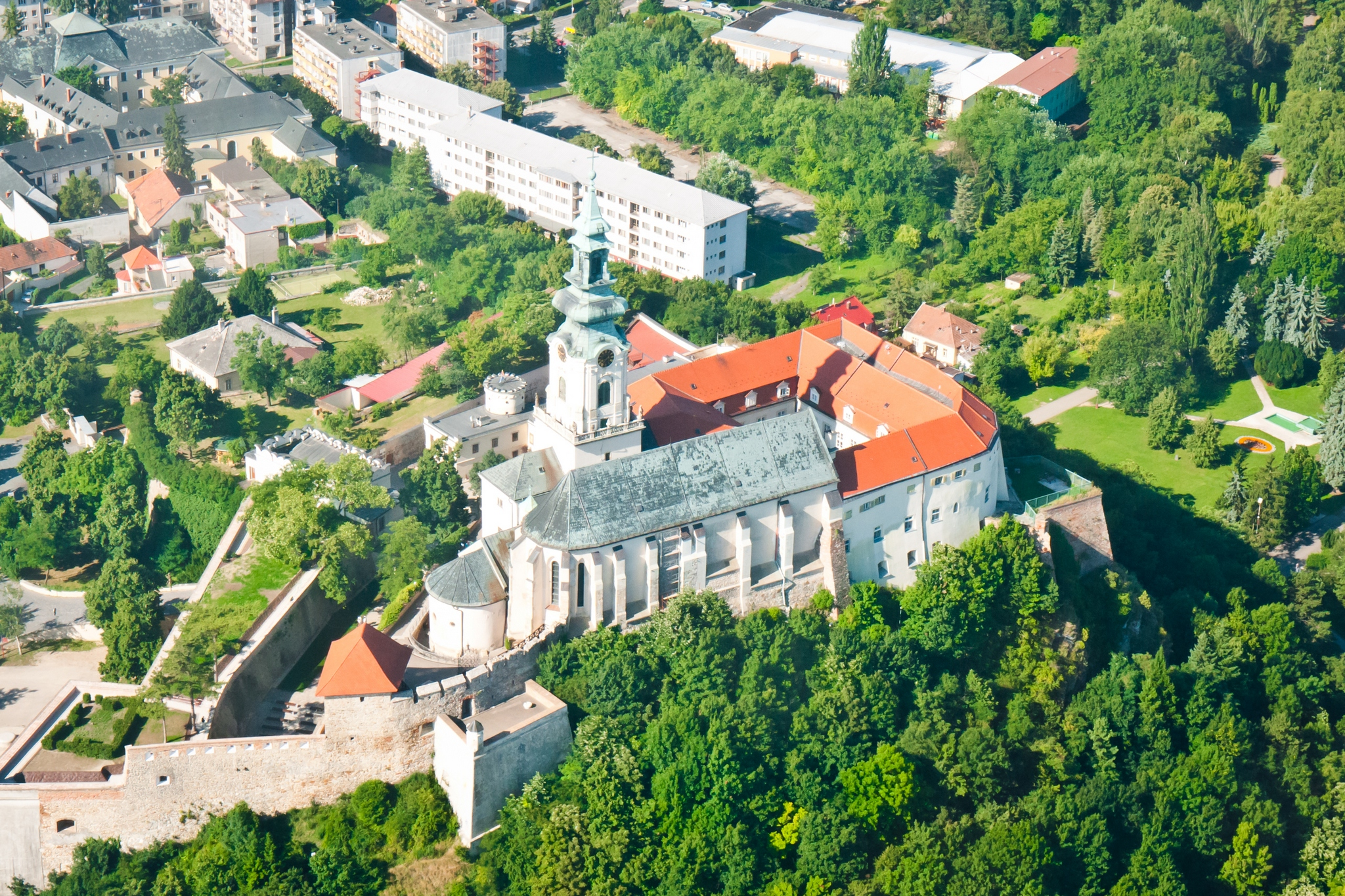
- St. Emmeram's Cathedral from above

- location in Slovakia
- 48°19′06″N 18°05′14″E
- Location: Nitra
- Country: Slovakia
- Denomination: Roman Catholic

History
- Dedication: St Emmeram of Regensburg

Architecture
- Architectural type: Church
- Style: Gothic, Baroque

Administration
- Diocese: Nitra

Clergy
- Bishop: Viliam Judák

Recording of the Cathedral's bells from 1936

St. Emmeram's Cathedral (Slovak: Bazilika svätého Emeráma) is a Roman Catholic cathedral located in Nitra, Slovakia. The entire cathedral is housed in the Nitra Castle precinct, much like Prague Castle.

Saint Emmeram of Regensburg, to whom the cathedral is dedicated, was an itinerant seventh-century bishop who did missionary work from the court of Theodo I, Duke of Bavaria.

It was originally built in the Gothic style and is composed of many parts. The upper church dates from 1333 to 1355. The rotunda dates back to the 11th–12th century and houses a silver reliquary made in 1674. Another reliquary in the cathedral houses some relics of Saint Cyril. The lower church was built between 1621 and 1642. Later, the entire cathedral complex was remodelled in the Baroque style.

Jozef Tiso, a priest who collaborated with Nazis and led the occupied, partially recognised Slovak State during the Second World War, was reburied in the crypt of Saint Emmeram's Cathedral in 2008 decades after his execution.

== Description ==
Pulpit

The pulpit is part of the solid Baroque interior decoration that was commissioned by Bishop László Ádám Erdődy in the first decades of the 18th century. It was built by the left pillar of the triumphal arch, with a stone stairway leading up from the chancel. Its red, green and white marbled surface and gilt stucco decoration matches the walls and the altars. The iconography is fairly simple, with three white cherubs on the abat-voix and the Eye of Providence between clouds.
