= List of railway stations in Serbia =

List of railway stations in Serbia.

== A ==
- Adaševci
- Adrani
- Adrovac
- Aleksandrovo Predgrađe
- Aleksa Šantić
- Aleksinac
- Alibunar
- Apatin
- Apatin Fabrika

== B ==
- Babin Potok
- Babljak
- Bačka Topola
- Bački Vinogradi
- Badnjevac
- Bagrdan
- Bajmok
- Baluga
- Banatski Miloševo Polje
- Banatski Karlovac
- Banatsko Miloševo
- Banatsko Novo Selo
- Banjska
- Barajevo
- Barajevo Centar
- Barlovo
- Batajnica
- Batočina
- Bela Palanka
- Belanovac
- Beli Potok
- Beloljin
- Belotince
- Beograd
- Beograd Centar
- Beograd Dunav
- Beška
- Bikovo
- Bistrica Na Limu
- Bočar
- Bogaraš
- Bogojevo
- Bogojevo Selo
- Bogutovačka Banja
- Bor
- Bor Teretna
- Boračko
- Božurat
- Braljina
- Branešci
- Bresničići
- Brestovac
- Brestovi
- Brezonik
- Brodarevo
- Brodica
- Brusnik
- Brvenik
- Brzan
- Buđanovci
- Bujanovac
- Bukovče
- Bukovička Rampa

== C ==
- Cerovo
- Cerovo-Ražanj
- Crepaja
- Crkvica
- Crnomasnica
- Crvena Reka
- Crvenčevo
- Crveni Breg
- Crveni Krst
- Crvenka
- Cvetojevac

== Č ==
- Čačak
- Čapljinac
- Češljeva Bara
- Čiflik
- Činiglavci
- Čoka
- Čokonjar
- Čonoplja
- Čortanovci
- Čortanovci Dunav

== Ć ==
- Ćele Kula
- Ćićevac
- Ćuprija

== D ==
- Debeli Lug
- Debeljača
- Dešiška
- Dimitrovgrad
- Divci
- Dobre Strane
- Dolac
- Doline
- Doljevac
- Donje Jarinje
- Donje Zuniće
- Donji Ljubeš
- Dragačevo
- Dragobraća
- Dražanj-Šepšin
- Dren
- Drenovac
- Drenovački Kik

== Dž ==
- Džep
- Džurovo

== Đ ==
- Đorđevo
- Đunis
- Đurđevo Polje

== E ==
- Elemir

== F ==
- Futog

== G ==
- Gabrić
- Gajdobra
- Gilje
- Glibovac
- Glumač
- Godomin
- Golubinci
- Goričani
- Gornjane
- Gornji Breg
- Gornji Ljubeš
- Gradac
- Gramada
- Grdelica
- Grejač
- Grlica
- Grljan
- Grošnica
- Gruža
- Guberevac

== H ==
- Hadžićevo
- Hajdukovo
- Horgoš

== I ==
- Ibarska Slatina
- Inđija
- Inđija Selo
- Iverak

== J ==
- Jablanica
- Jabuka
- Jagodina
- Jajinci
- Jasenica
- Jasenovik
- Jasikovo
- Jelen Do
- Jošanička Banja
- Jovac
- Jovanovac

== K ==
- Kać
- Kačarevo
- Kalenić
- Kanjiža
- Kaona
- Karađorđev Park
- Karavukovo
- Karlovački Vinogradi
- Kasapovac
- Kastrat
- Kaznovići
- Kijevo
- Kikinda
- Kisač
- Klenak
- Klenje
- Kljajićevo
- Knezevac
- Knić
- Knjaževac
- Kobišnica
- Kočane
- Kolari
- Korman
- Kosančić Ivan
- Kosanica
- Kosanička Rača
- Kosjerić
- Kosovska Mitrovica
- Kovačevac
- Kovačica
- Kragujevac
- Kraljevo
- Kriveljski Most
- Kriveljski Potok
- Krnjača
- Krnjevo-Trnovče
- Kučevo
- Kukići
- Kukujevci-Erdevik
- Kula
- Kumane
- Kuršumlija
- Kusadak

== L ==
- Lajkovac
- Lanište
- Lapovo
- Lapovo Ranž.Staj.
- Lapovo Varoš
- Lastra
- Lazarevac
- Lepenički Most
- Leposavić
- Lešak
- Leskovac
- Leskovac Kolubarski
- Leskovice
- Leskovo
- Letovica
- Lipe
- Lipovica
- Lovćenac
- Lozno
- Lozovik-Saraorci
- Lučice
- Lučina
- Lugavčina
- Lukavac Kolubarski
- Lukićevo
- Lukomir
- Lužane

== Lj ==
- Ljubičevski most
- Ljubinje
- Ljuša
- Ljutovo

== M ==
- Majdanpek
- Mala Ivanča
- Mala Krsna
- Mali Beograd
- Mali Iđoš
- Mali Iđoš Polje
- Mali Izvor
- Mali Krivelj
- Mali Požarevac
- Malošište
- Markovac
- Martinci
- Martonoš
- Mataruška Banja
- Matejevac
- Međurovo
- Melenci
- Merdare
- Mezgraja
- Milatovac
- Milavčići
- Miloševac
- Miloševo
- Minićevo
- Mladenovac
- Mlađevo
- Momin Kamen
- Mrsać
- Mršinci
- Mustapić

== N ==
- Naumovićevo
- Negotin
- Nenadovac
- Nikinci
- Nikolinci
- Niš
- Niš Ranžirna
- Niševac
- Niška Banja
- Nova Pazova
- Novi Bečej
- Novi Beograd
- Novi Sad
- Novi Sivac
- Novo Selo
- Novoselske Livade
- Nozrina

== O ==
- Odžaci
- Odžaci Kalvarija
- Orlovat Stajalište
- Orom
- Osipaonica
- Osipaonica Stajalište
- Ostojićevo
- Ostrovica
- Otanj
- Ovča
- Ovčar Banja

== P ==
- Padej
- Palanka
- Palić
- Palilula
- Palilulska Rampa
- Palojska Rosulja
- Pančevački Most
- Pančevo Glavna
- Pančevo Strelište
- Pančevo Varoš
- Pančevo Vojlovica
- Pantelej
- Paraćin
- Parage
- Pavliš
- Pečenjevce
- Pepeljevac
- Petrovac-Gložan
- Petrovaradin
- Pinosava
- Pirot
- Piskanja
- Plandište
- Platićevo
- Pločnik
- Počekovina
- Podina
- Podlokanj
- Podvis
- Poljice
- Polumir
- Požarevac
- Požega
- Prahovo
- Prahovo Pristanište
- Predejane
- Preševo
- Priboj
- Priboj Leskovački
- Priboj Vranjski
- Pribojska Banja
- Prigrevica
- Prijepolje
- Prijepolje Teretna
- Prijevor
- Progorelica
- Prokuplje
- Prosek
- Pukovac
- Pusto Polje
- Putinci

== R ==
- Rabrovac
- Rabrovo-Klenje
- Rača
- Radinac
- Radov Dol
- Rajac
- Rakovica
- Ralja
- Ralja Smederevska
- Rasna
- Ratare
- Ratkovo
- Raška
- Ražana
- Rečica
- Resnik
- Resnik Kragujevački
- Rgošte
- Rgotina
- Ribnica Zlatiborska
- Ripanj
- Ripanj Kolonija
- Ripanj Tunel
- Ristanovića Polje
- Ristovac
- Rogljevo
- Rudare
- Rudnica
- Ruma
- Rvati

== S ==
- Samaila
- Samari
- Saraorci
- Sebeš
- Selačka Reka
- Senta
- Sevojno
- Sićevo
- Sikirica-Ratari
- Sinjac
- Sirča
- Sivac
- Skenderovo
- Skobalj
- Slovac
- Smederevo
- Sočanica
- Sokolovica
- Sombor
- Sonta
- Sopot Kosmajski
- Sremska Mitrovica
- Sremski Karlovci
- Stalać
- Staničenje
- Stapari
- Stara Pazova
- Staro Selo
- Staro Trubarevo
- Stepanovićevo
- Stepojevac
- Stevanac
- Stig
- Stubal
- Subotica
- Subotica Jav.Skladišta
- Subotica Predgrađe
- Sukovo
- Supovački Most
- Sušica
- Suva Morava
- Svetozar Miletić
- Svrljig
- Svrljiški Miljkovac

== Š ==
- Šabac
- Šajinovac
- Šebešić
- Šid
- Štrpci
- Šumarice
- Šušulajka

== T ==
- Tabakovac
- Tabakovačka Reka
- Tamnić
- Tavankut
- Tešica
- Timok
- Tomaševac
- Tomića Brdo
- Topčider
- Toplica Milan
- Toplička Mala Plana
- Toplički Badnjevac
- Tošin Bunar
- Trbušani
- Tripkova
- Trnavac
- Trnjani
- Trupale
- Tubići
- Turija Kučevska

== U ==
- Uljma
- Umčari
- Ušće
- Uzdin
- Užice
- Užice Teretna
- Uzići

== V ==
- Valač
- Valjevo
- Valjevski Gradac
- Vasiljevac
- Velika Plana
- Velika Župa
- Veliki Borak
- Veliki Jovanovac
- Veliko Orašje
- Veljkovo
- Verušić
- Vinarci
- Visoka
- Vitanovac
- Vitkovac
- Vitkovac Staj.
- Vladičin Han
- Vladimirovac
- Vlajkovac
- Vlaole
- Vlaole Selo
- Vlaško Polje
- Vodanj
- Voganj
- Voluja
- Vranje
- Vranjska Banja
- Vranovo
- Vratarnica
- Vražogrnac
- Vrbas
- Vrbnica
- Vrčin
- Vreoci
- Vršac
- Vrtište
- Vučkovica
- Vukov Spomenik

== Z ==
- Zablaće
- Zagrađe
- Zaječar
- Zavod
- Zemun
- Zemunsko Polje
- Zlakusa
- Zlatibor
- Zlatica
- Zmajevo
- Zrenjanin
- Zrenjanin Fabrika
- Zuce
- Zvečan
- Zvižd

== Ž ==
- Žednik
- Žitorađa
- Žitorađa Centar
- Živkovo
