= Lepenica (Great Morava) =

Lepenica (Лепеница)
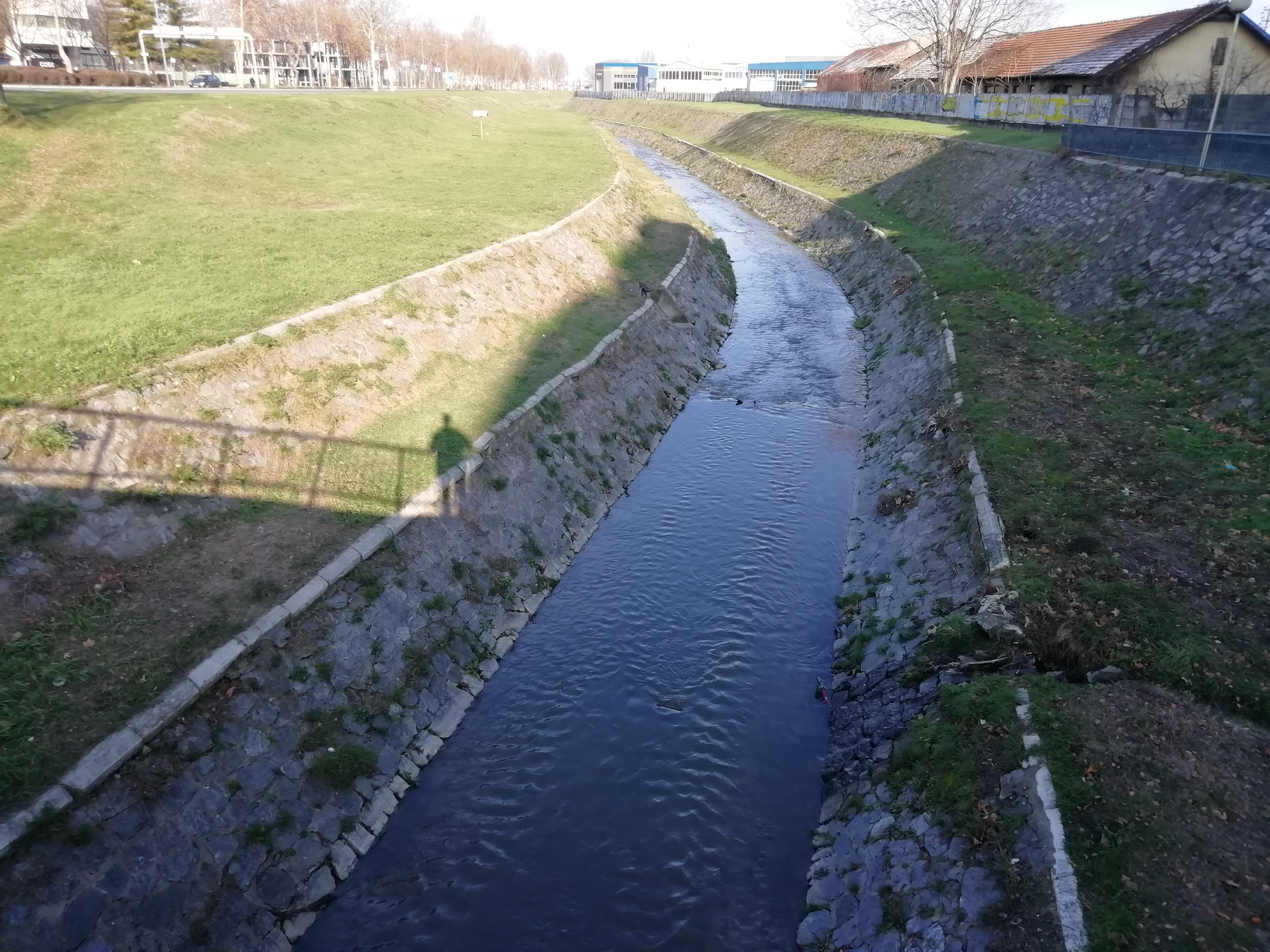
- View on Lepenica from bridge, near Kragujevac city center, January 2020

Location
- Country: Serbia

Physical characteristics
- Mouth
  - location: Great Morava
  - coordinates: 44.1594°N 21.1397°E
- Basin size: 625 km^{2} (241 sq mi)

Basin features
- Progression: Great Morava→ Danube→ Black Sea

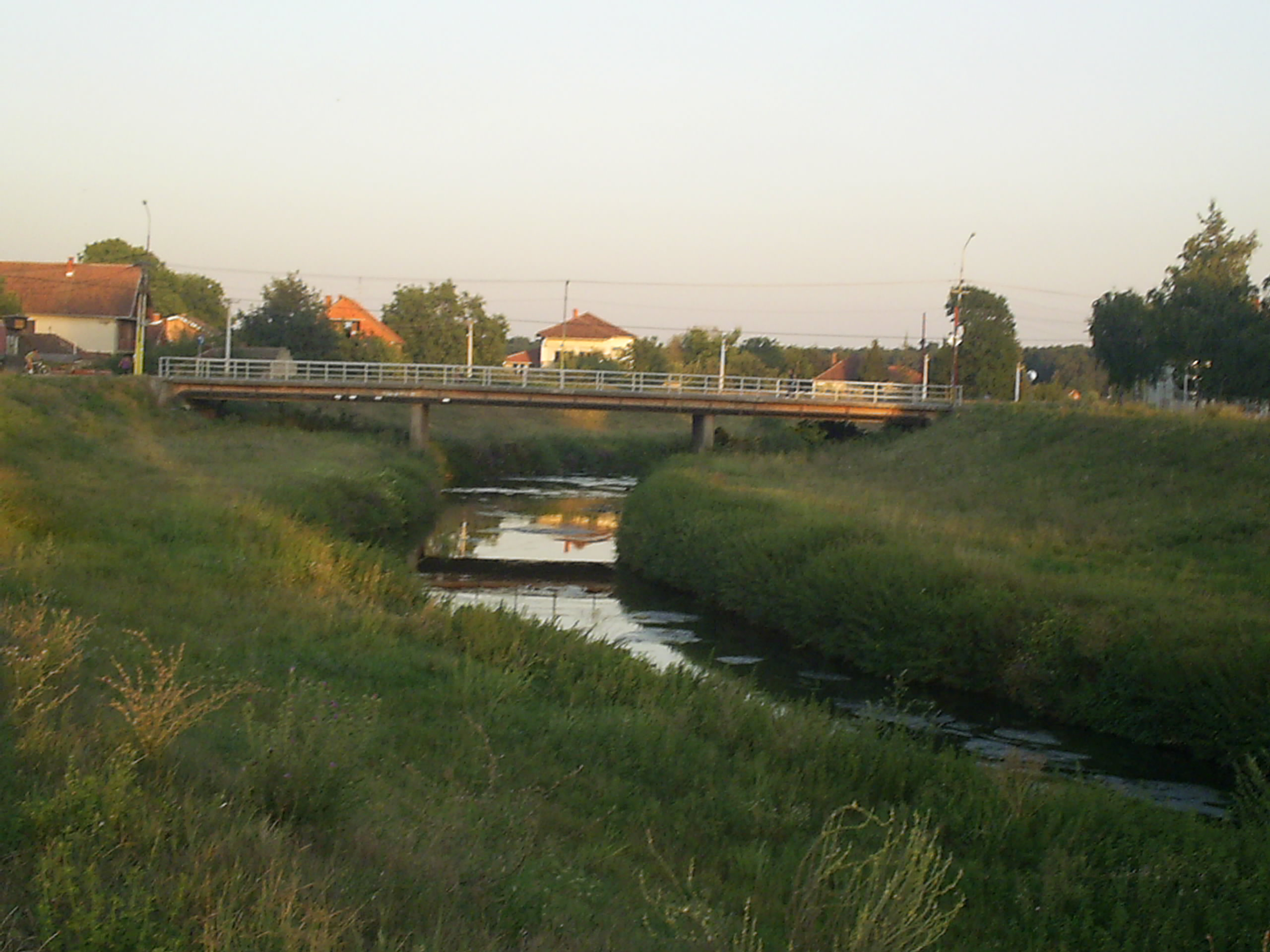
View on Lepenica in Batočina, February 2004

The Lepenica (Serbian Cyrillic: Лепеница) is a river in the region of Šumadija, in central Serbia. It is 48 km (30 mi) long and runs through the city of Kragujevac.

The Lepenica springs in the village of Goločelo, southwest of Kragujevac. It receives 37 tributaries, many of which spring on the slopes of the Gledić mountains. It flows into the Great Morava at Lapovo. It used to be navigable for small vessels, but today is reduced to the minor stream.

Still, the river was known for floods, especially after the streams and creeks from the Gledić mountains rise during the heavy rains. The greatest flood happened in 1897, when the river completely changed its course, leaving the old riverbed, and shortening itself for 12 km (7.5 mi), from 60 km (37 mi) to 48 km (30 mi). The banks on its course through Kragujevac were arranged for the first time in 1970, after a major flood.

The riverbed was further deepened in 1978, when floodings in Kragujevac stopped as the river was reduced to the small stream in the concreted riverbed. The quay was reconstructed and strengthened in 2017–2018. However, in June 2023 after the torrential rains, Lepenica overspilled and flooded wide parts of Kragujevac (Grošnica, Veliko Polje, Korićani, Stanovo, Palilula) and some people had to be evacuated.
