= Čapljinac =

- Village
- Location within Serbia
- Country: Serbia
- Region: Southern and Eastern Serbia
- District: Nišava
- Municipality: Doljevac
- Time zone: UTC+1 (CET)
  - Summer (DST): UTC+2 (CEST)

Čapljinac is a village situated in Doljevac municipality, Nišava District in Serbia. Čapljinac is nearby to Belotinac, Čaplinci and Batušinac.
