= Mustapic =

Mustapic or Mustapić may refer to:

== Places ==
- Mustapić, Serbia, a village near Kučevo

== People with the surname Mustapic ==
- Dan Mustapic (born 1960), New Zealand curler
- James Mustapic (born 1995 or 1996), New Zealand comedian

== People with the surname Mustapić ==
- Dragan Mustapić (born 1963), Croatian discus thrower
- Ivan Mustapić (born 1966), Croatian javelin thrower
- Ivan Mustapić (marathon runner), Bosnian Croat runner
- Jakov Mustapić (born 1994), Croatian basketball player
