= Draca =

Draca may refer to:

- Germanic dragon
- Drača, a village in Serbia
