= Babin Potok =

Babin Potok may refer to:

Bosnia and Herzegovina

- Babin Potok, Donji Vakuf
- Babin Potok, Višegrad

Serbia

- Babin Potok, Prokuplje
