= Sinjac Monastery =

Orthodox Monastery

Sinjac Monastery Манастир Сињац
- Interactive map of Sinjac Monastery; Манастир Сињац

Monastery information
- Full name: Манастир - Сињац
- Order: Serbian Orthodox
- Established: Before 1618
- Dedication: Saint Nicholas

Site
- Location: Sinjac
- Coordinates: 43.2180°N 22.4166°E
- Public access: Yes

The Sinjac Monastery (or Čiflik Monastery) is located in the village of Sinjac, Serbia, on the banks of the Nišava River, in the municipality of Bela Palanka. It is dedicated to Saint Nicholas. Monastery belongs to the Eparchy of Niš of the Serbian Orthodox Church and represents an immovable cultural asset as a cultural monument.

== History ==
The exact time of construction of the Monastery is not known, except for the record that it was painted in 1618. While in 1662, there is mention of monks who copied Oktoich first vowel. The church was badly damaged in the Serbian-Turkish war in 1876, when the Circassians burned it down. After the liberation from the Turks (1878), the western wall that separated the older building from the added chancel was still preserved. In the complex of the medieval monastery there were a church, an inn and a water mill. Today, the mill is no longer there, and the inn has no use value.

== Architecture ==
It is basically a triconconal building, with a blind dome above the central span. The dome rests on two pairs of overhanging leaning arches, which rest on the fronts of the longitudinal vaults of the eastern and western aisles. The apses are semicircular both externally and internally. Most likely, immediately after construction and painting, a spacious porch was added on the west side. Recently, a large painting was discovered, which is quite well preserved. The layout of the frescoes is characteristic of the 17th century. In the altar apse there is a procession of archpriests, and in the conch there is the Virgin Mary with Christ. In the dome is Christ the Almighty with the evangelists and prophets. The cycle of great feasts and the cycle of Christ's Passion are only partially preserved. The manner and style of making the frescoes indicate that the painter was educated, although not of great abilities. Certain historians of fine art consider the composition of colors to be extremely skillful and especially emphasize red, purple, light blue, green, ocher and yellow, and they consider the frescoes with representations of Christ, Saint Sava and Simeon to be the most impressive. There are opinions that this is the easternmost location of the Church with the representation of Saint Simeon the Myrrh-Blower in Serbia. The wall painting decoration represents the most significant painting ensemble from the beginning of the 17th century in eastern Serbia. The complex of the medieval monastery included a church, an inn and a water mill. Today, the mill is no longer there, and the inn has no use value. During the construction of the railway that passed in the immediate vicinity of the monastery in 1887 - 1888, the engineers, the contractors, were aware that vibrations and tremors due to the passage of the compositions could be disastrous for the building, so they installed two transverse steel fasteners as a preventive measure, with which they wanted to prevent appearance of blisters. It was certainly good, but not enough, and two hundred years of railway traffic next to it had a disastrous effect. Today, the monastery is badly damaged, and it is in urgent need of restoration. In the late Turkish period, literacy was taught there.
