= Stanovo =

Coordinates: 44°00′16″N 20°52′29″E

Stanovo Станово
- City municipality
- Interactive map of Stanovo
- Country: Serbia
- Region: Šumadija and Western Serbia
- District: Šumadija
- Municipality: Kragujevac
- Founded: 31 May 2002
- Dissolved: 4 March 2008
- Settlements: 14

Area
  - Municipality: 154.82 km^{2} (59.78 sq mi)

Population (2002 census)
  - Urban: 32,965
  - Municipality: 39,252
- Time zone: UTC+1 (CET)
  - Summer (DST): UTC+2 (CEST)
- Postal code: 34000
- Area code: +381(0)34
- Car plates: KG

Stanovo (Serbian Cyrillic: Станово) was one of five city municipalities which constituted the City of Kragujevac. According to the 2002 census, 39,252 residents lived in the municipality, while the urban area had 32,965 residents. The municipality was formed in May 2002, only to be dissolved in March 2008.

== Inhabited places ==
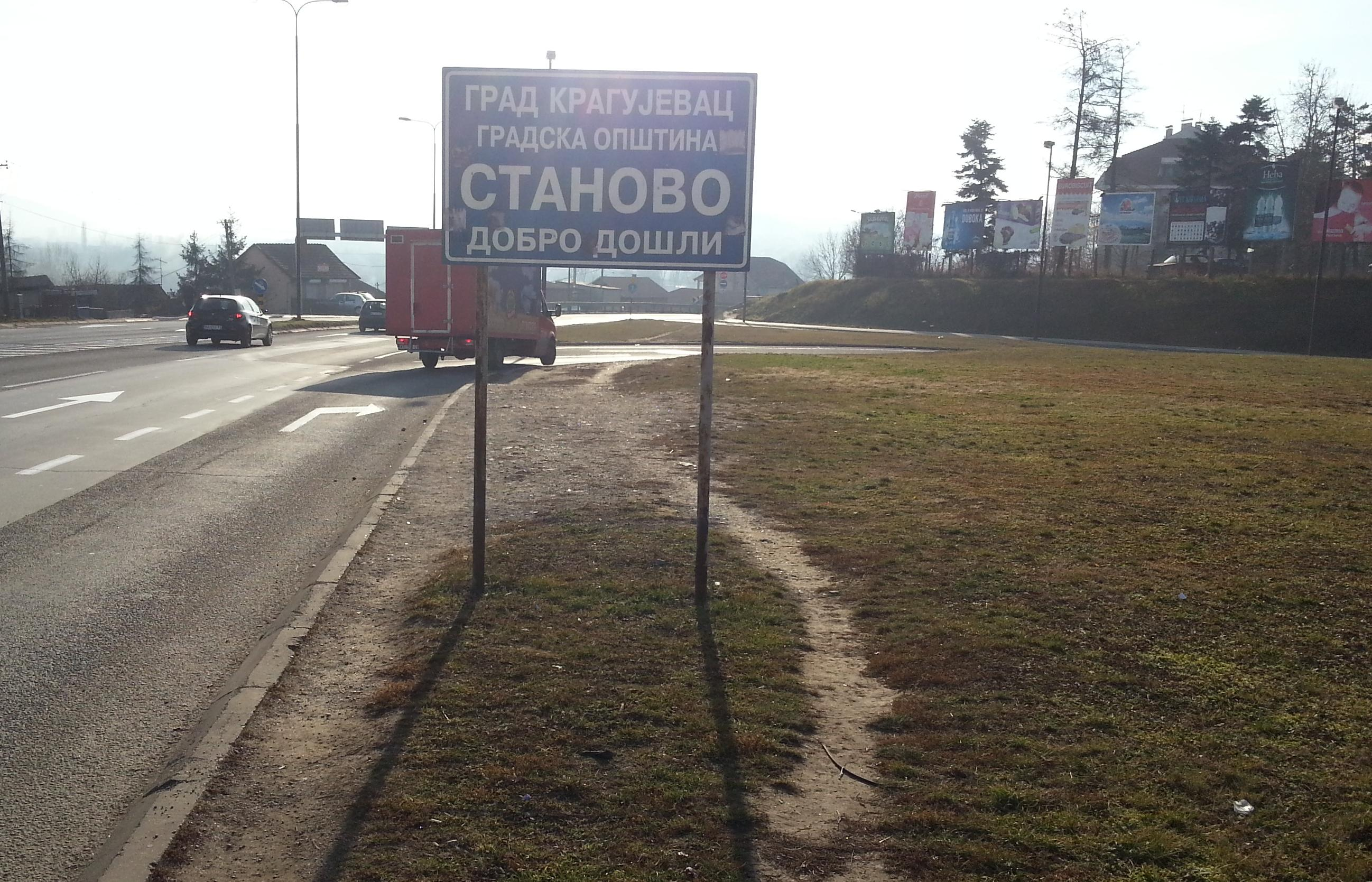
Former entrance roadside sign

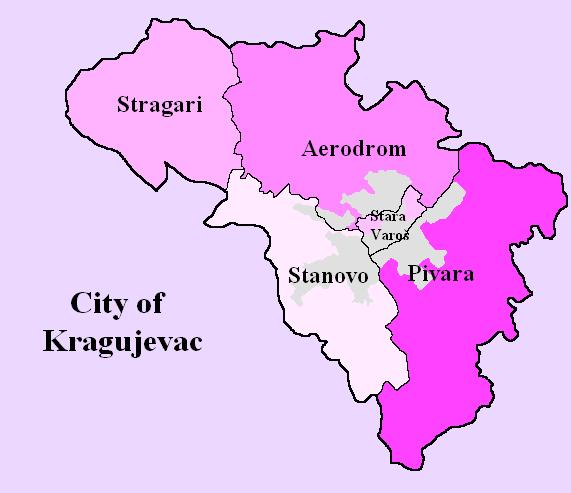
Map of the city municipalities which constituted the city of Kragujevac

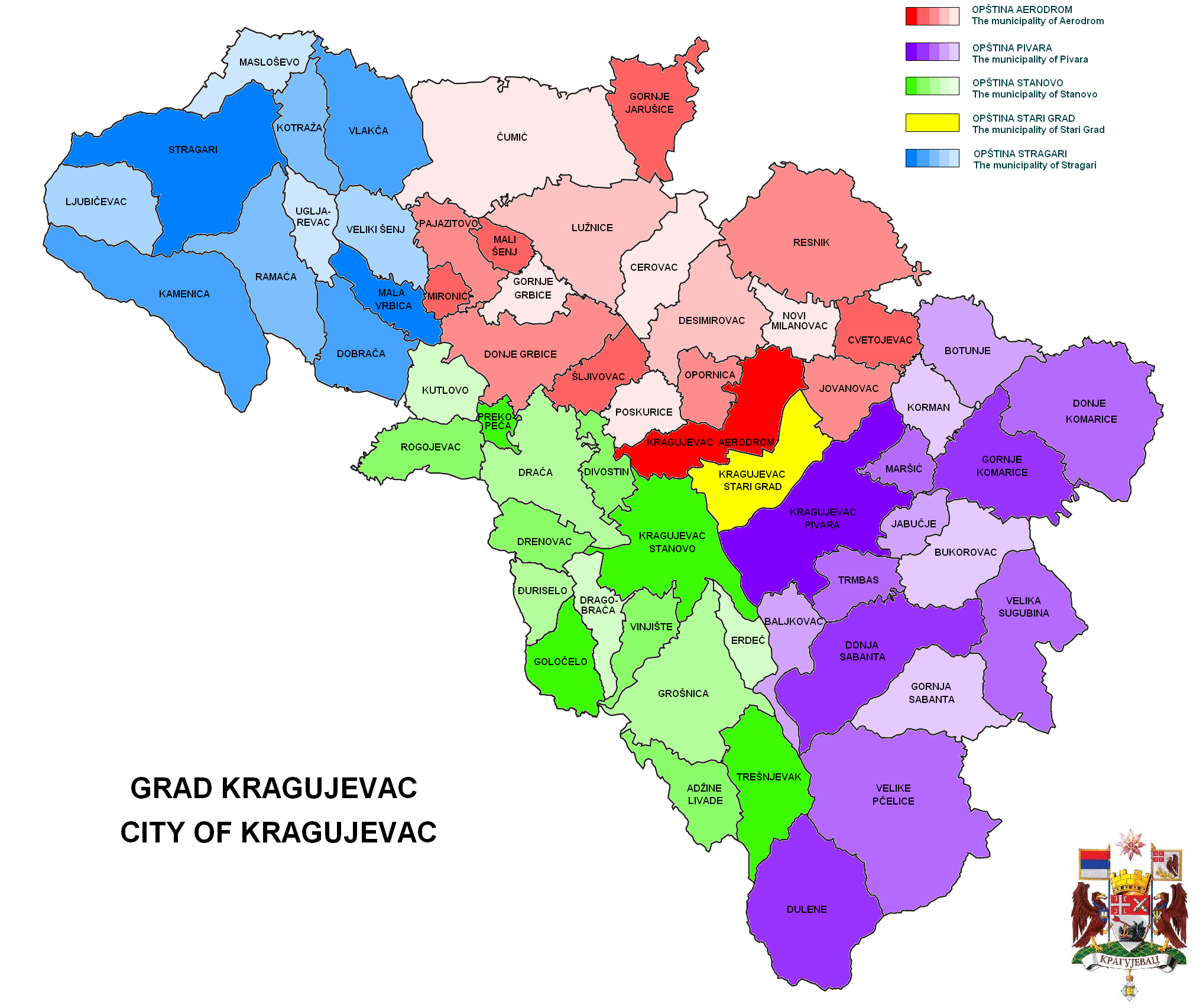
Map of the city municipalities with settlements

The Municipality of Stanovo was composed of the following suburbs:

- Stanovo
- Veliko Polje
- Korićani
- Male Pčelice - Staro selo
- Male Pčelice-Novo Naselje
- Trešnjevak
- Adžine Livade
- Erdeč
- Vinjište
- Goločelo
- Grošnica
- Dragobraća
- Đuriselo
- Drenovac
- Drača
- Divostin
- Prekopeča
- Rogojevac
- Kutlovo
