= Lastras =

Lastras may refer to:

== Places ==
- Lastras de Cuéllar, a municipality located in the province of Segovia, Castile and León, Spain
- Lastras del Pozo, a municipality located in the province of Segovia, Castile and León, Spain

== People ==
- Alfonso Lastras Ramírez (1924-1999), Mexican lawyer and politician
- Pablo Lastras (born 1976), Spanish cyclist

== See also ==
- Lastra, a surname
