= Kutlovo =

Kutlovo may refer to either of the following Serbian villages:

- Kutlovo (Kuršumlija)
- Kutlovo (Stanovo)
