= Trešnjevak =

Coordinates: 44.0333°N 20.7667°E

Trešnjevak Трешњевак (Serbian)
- Village
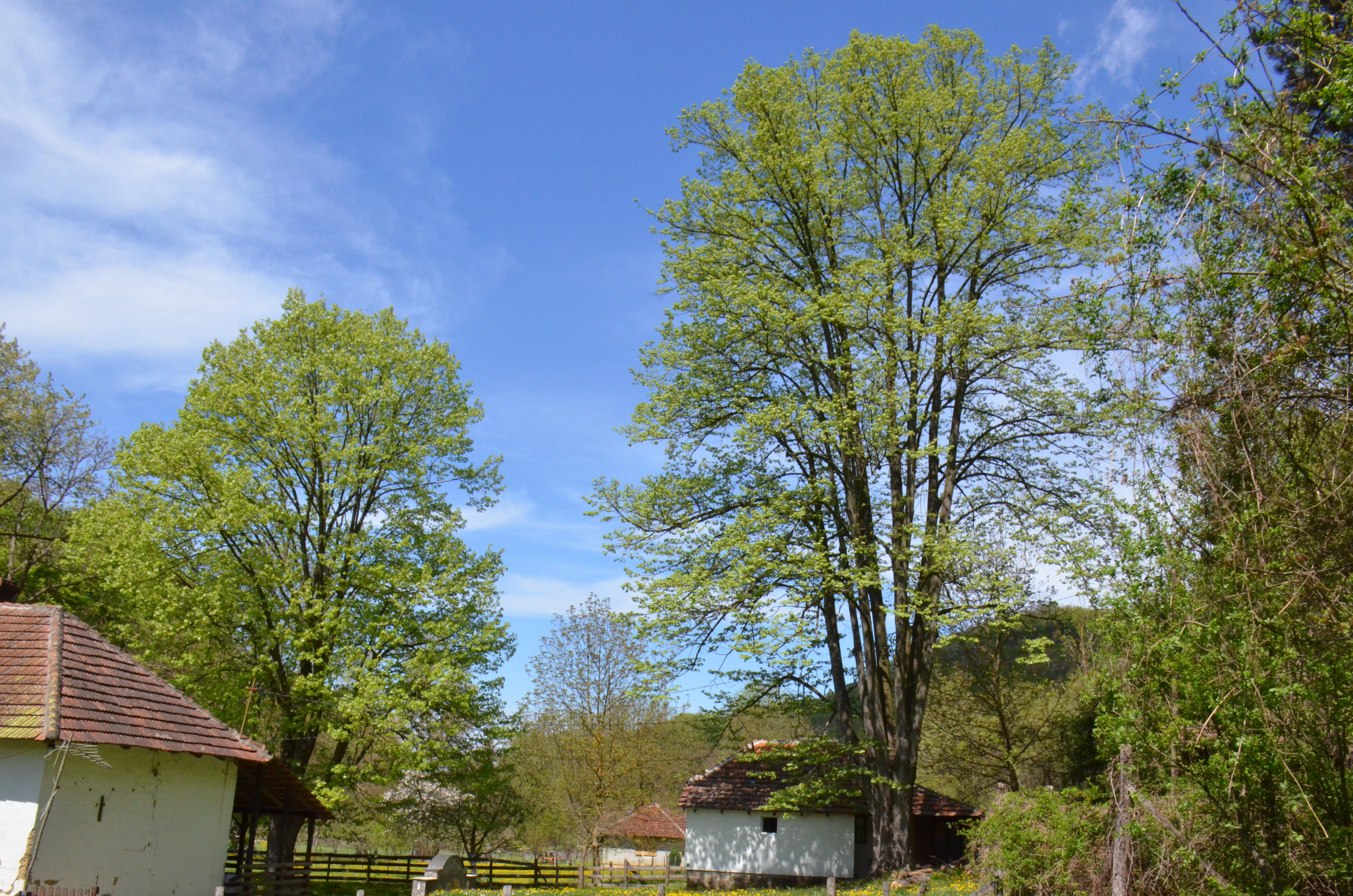
- Interactive map of Trešnjevak
- Country: Serbia
- District: Šumadija District
- Municipality: Stanovo

Population (2002)
  - Total: 24
- Time zone: UTC+1 (CET)
  - Summer (DST): UTC+2 (CEST)

Trešnjevak is a village in the municipality of Stanovo, Serbia. According to the 2002 census, the village has a population of 24 people.
