= Prekopeča =

Coordinates: 44°02′N 20°48′E

Prekopeča Прекопеча (Serbian)
- Village
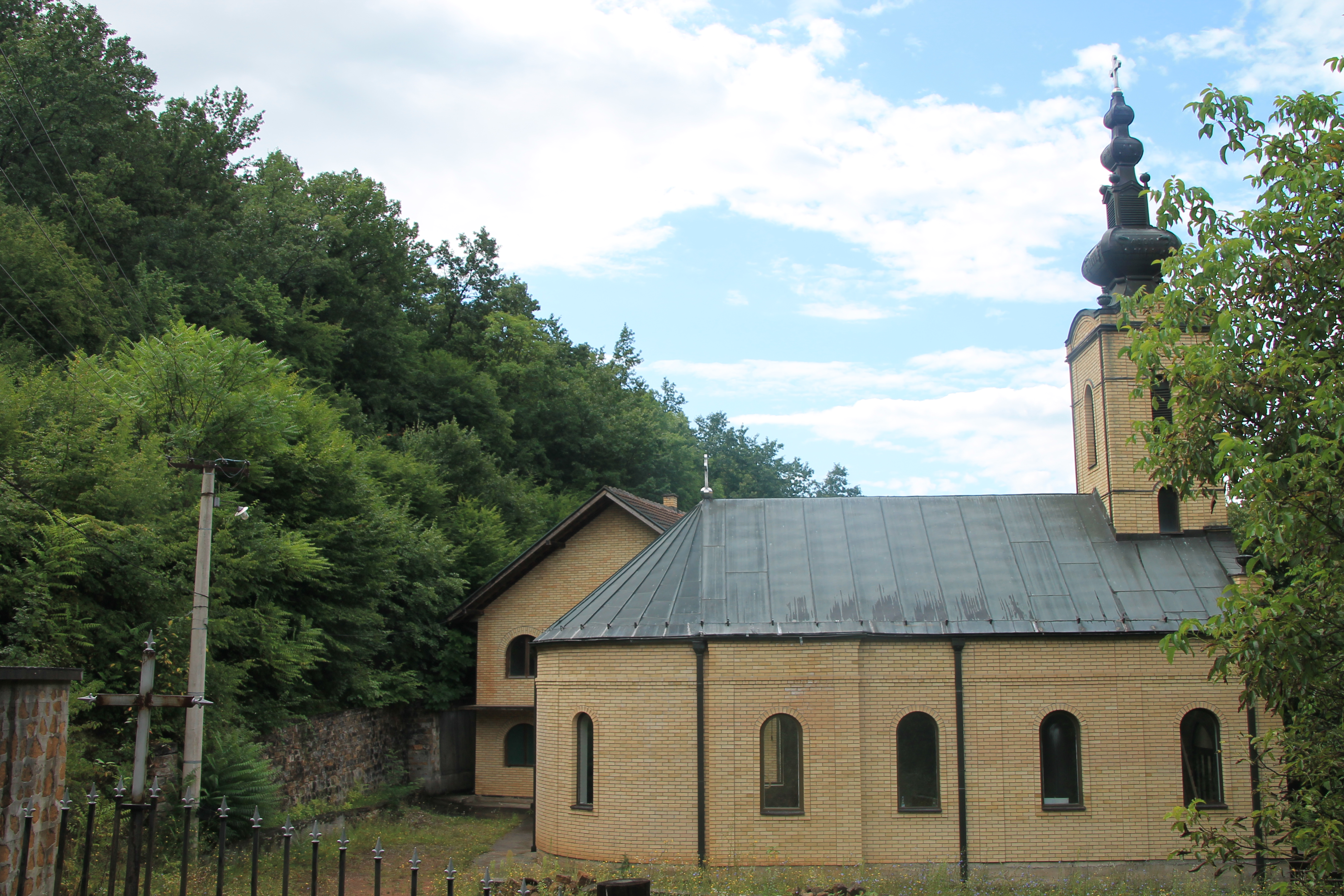
- Interactive map of Prekopeča
- Country: Serbia
- District: Šumadija District
- Municipality: Stanovo

Population (2002)
  - Total: 123
- Time zone: UTC+1 (CET)
  - Summer (DST): UTC+2 (CEST)

Prekopeča (Serbian: Прекопеча) is a village in the municipality of Stanovo, Serbia. According to the 2002 census, the village has a population of 123 people.
