= Gledić Mountains =

Mountain in Serbia

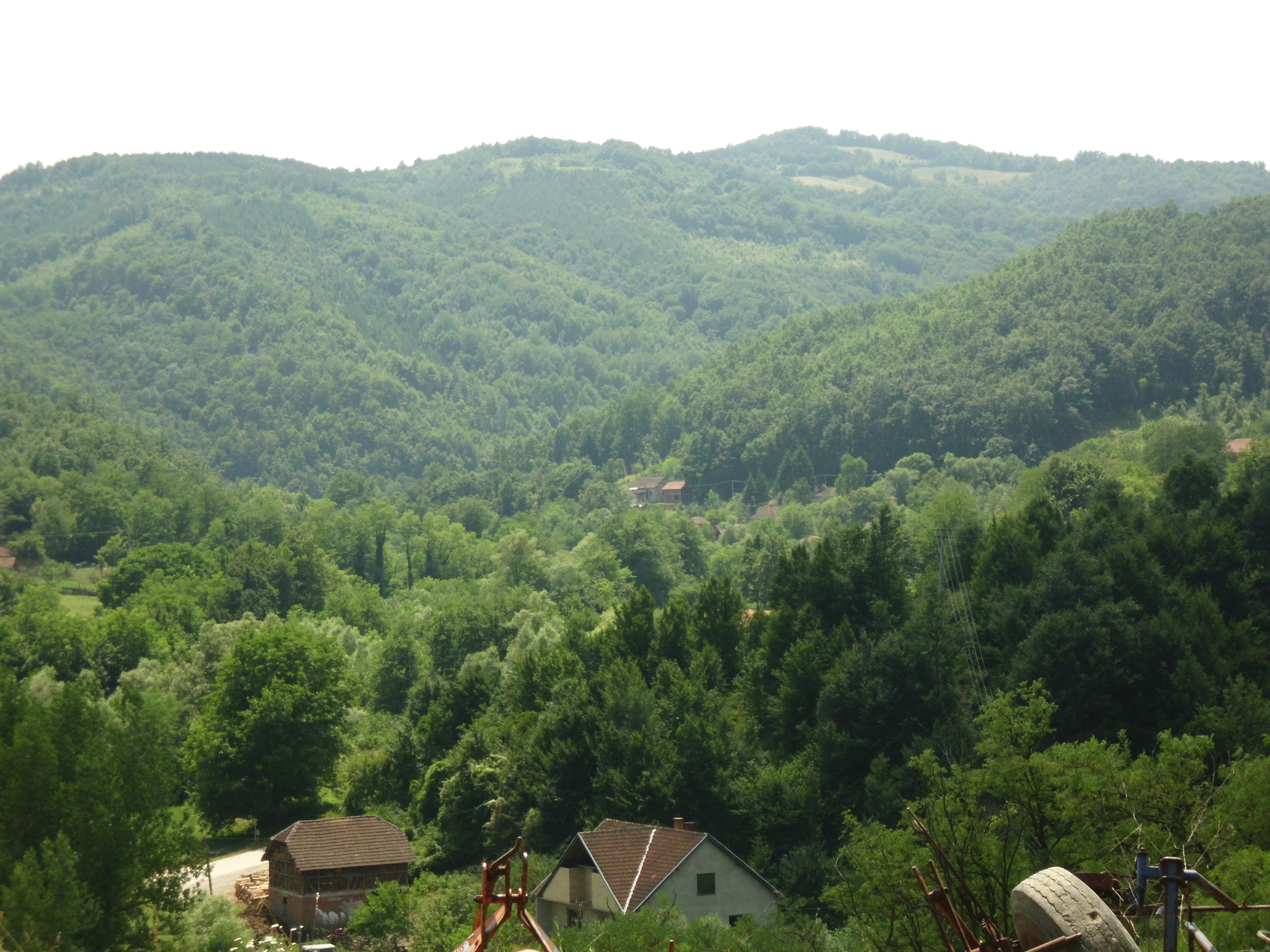

Highest point
- Elevation: 922 m (3,025 ft)
- Coordinates: 43°45′03″N 20°57′03″E

Geography
- Location within Serbia
- Location: Central Serbia
- Parent range: Dinaric Alps

Gledić Mountains (Serbian Cyrillic: Гледићке планине) is a mountain in central Serbia, between towns of Kragujevac, Jagodina and Trstenik. Its highest peak Samar has an elevation of 922 m (3,025 ft) above sea level. It is popular with mountain walkers.

At the foothills of the mountain are two medieval Orthodox monasteries of considerable historical and architectural importance, Kalenić and Ljubostinja.

Mountain roads are good for mountain bikes, cars, and four-wheel drive vehicles. There is a mountain lodge in Čestin (near Adžine Livade) and a private accommodation in an inn in the village of Gledić which is over one hundred years old. The mountain has numerous hunting reserves.

== See also ==
- List of mountains in Serbia
