= Vinjište =

Vinjište Вињиште (Serbian)
- Village
- Location within Serbia
- Coordinates: 43°57′21″N 20°50′54″E
- Country: Serbia
- District: Šumadija District
- Municipality: Stanovo

Population (2002)
  - Total: 412
- Time zone: UTC+1 (CET)
  - Summer (DST): UTC+2 (CEST)

Vinjište is a village in the municipality of Stanovo, Serbia. According to the 2002 census, the village has a population of 412 people.
