= Lastra =

Lastra is a surname. Notable people with the surname include:

- Adriana Lastra (born 1979), Spanish politician
- Alfonso Lastra Chárriez (1887–1946), Puerto Rican lawyer and politician
- Anselmo Lastra, American computer scientist
- Cecilio Lastra (1951–2025), Spanish boxer
- Francisco de la Lastra (1777–1852), Chilean military officer
- Gabriela Lastra (born 1980), American tennis player
- Gladys de la Lastra (1932–2005), Panamanian musician and composer
- Héctor Lastra (1943–2006), Argentine writer
- Jonathan Lastra (born 1993), Spanish cyclist
- Osbaldo Lastra (born 1983), Ecuadorian footballer
- Pedro Lastra (born 1932), Chilean poet and essayist
- Ricardo Cortés Lastra, Spanish politician
- Rodrigo Lastra (born 1998), Argentine footballer
- Yolanda Lastra (born 1932), Mexican linguist

== Other uses ==
- Lastra a Signa, a comune (municipality) in the metropolitan city of Florence in the Italian region Tuscany

== See also ==
- Lastras (disambiguation)
