= Đuriselo =

Đuriselo Ђурисело (Serbian)
- Village
- Location within Serbia
- Coordinates: 43°58′41″N 20°48′06″E
- Country: Serbia
- District: Šumadija District
- Municipality: Stanovo

Population (2002)
  - Total: 699
- Time zone: UTC+1 (CET)
  - Summer (DST): UTC+2 (CEST)

Đuriselo (Serbian: Ђурисело) is a village in the municipality of Stanovo, Serbia. According to the 2002 census, the village has a population of 699 people.
