= Erdeč =

Erdeč Ердеч (Serbian)
- Village
- Location within Serbia
- Coordinates: 43°58′17″N 20°54′02″E
- Country: Serbia
- District: Šumadija District
- Municipality: Stanovo

Population (2022)
  - Total: 86
- Time zone: UTC+1 (CET)
  - Summer (DST): UTC+2 (CEST)

Erdeč (Serbian: Ердеч) is a village in the municipality of Stanovo, Serbia. According to the 2022 census, the village has a population of 85 people.
