= Inđija railway station =

Railway station in Serbia

Coordinates: 45°2′10″N 20°5′40″E

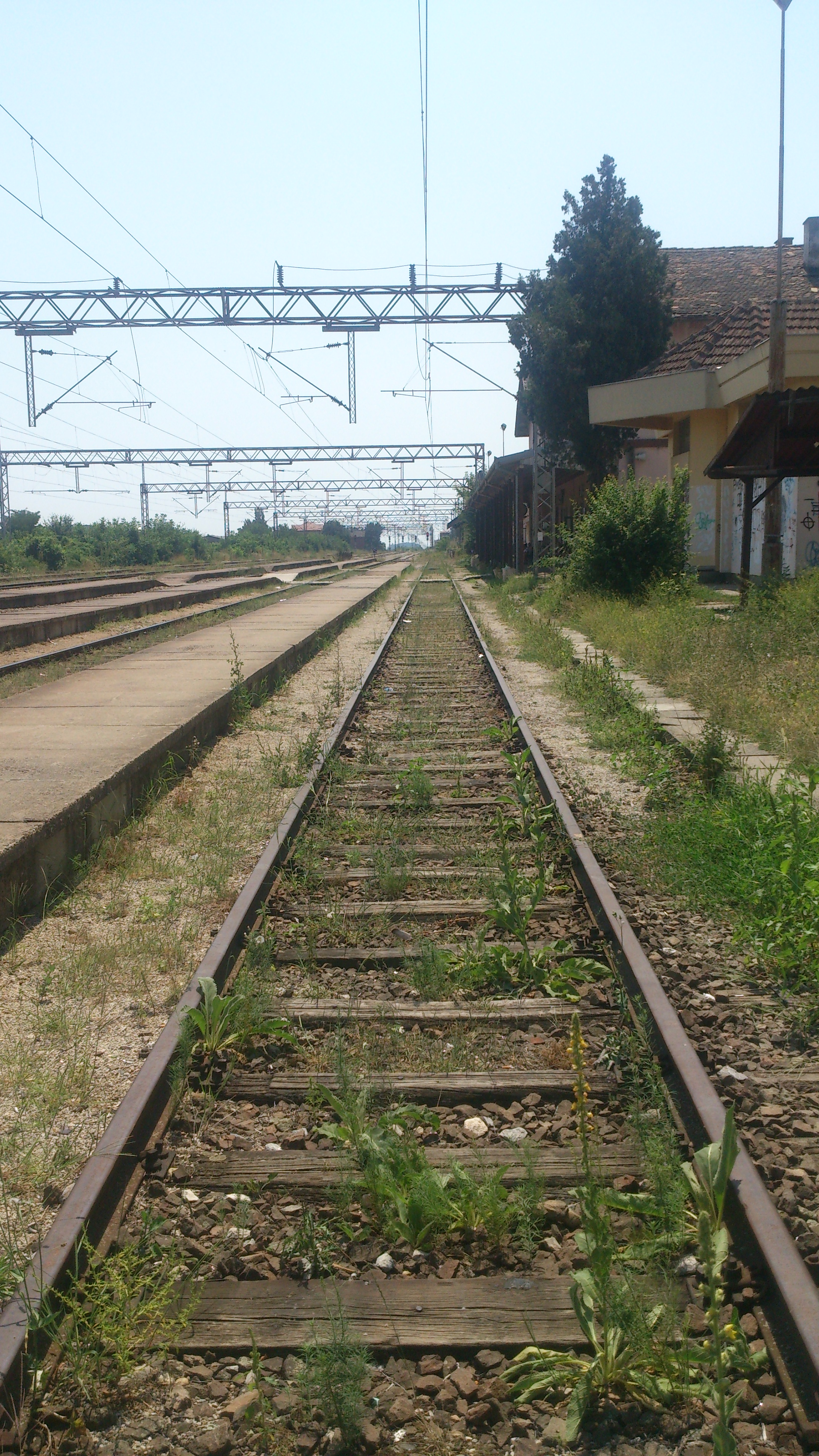
Inđija railway station in 2017

Inđija railway station is located 1 km from the city center of Inđija. Being located on the route between Novi Sad and Belgrade, the station receives regular traffic for fast passenger trains. Railroads continue to Inđija Pustara in one direction, Stara Pazova in another direction, and in a third direction towards to Golubinci. Inđija railway station consists of 7 railway track.

In 2023, Metrans Rail announced the opening of a terminal station in Inđija, with services towards Budapest.

== See also ==
- Serbian Railways
- Beovoz
