= Gilje =

Gilje is a surname. Notable people with the surname include:

- Arne Gilje (born 1956), Norwegian rower
- HC Gilje (born 1969), Norwegian artist
- Kathleen Gilje (born 1945), American art restorer and artist
- Rein Gilje (born 1959), Norwegian sprint canoer
