= Čonoplja =

Čonoplja Чонопља (Serbian) Csonoplya (Hungarian)
- Village (Selo)
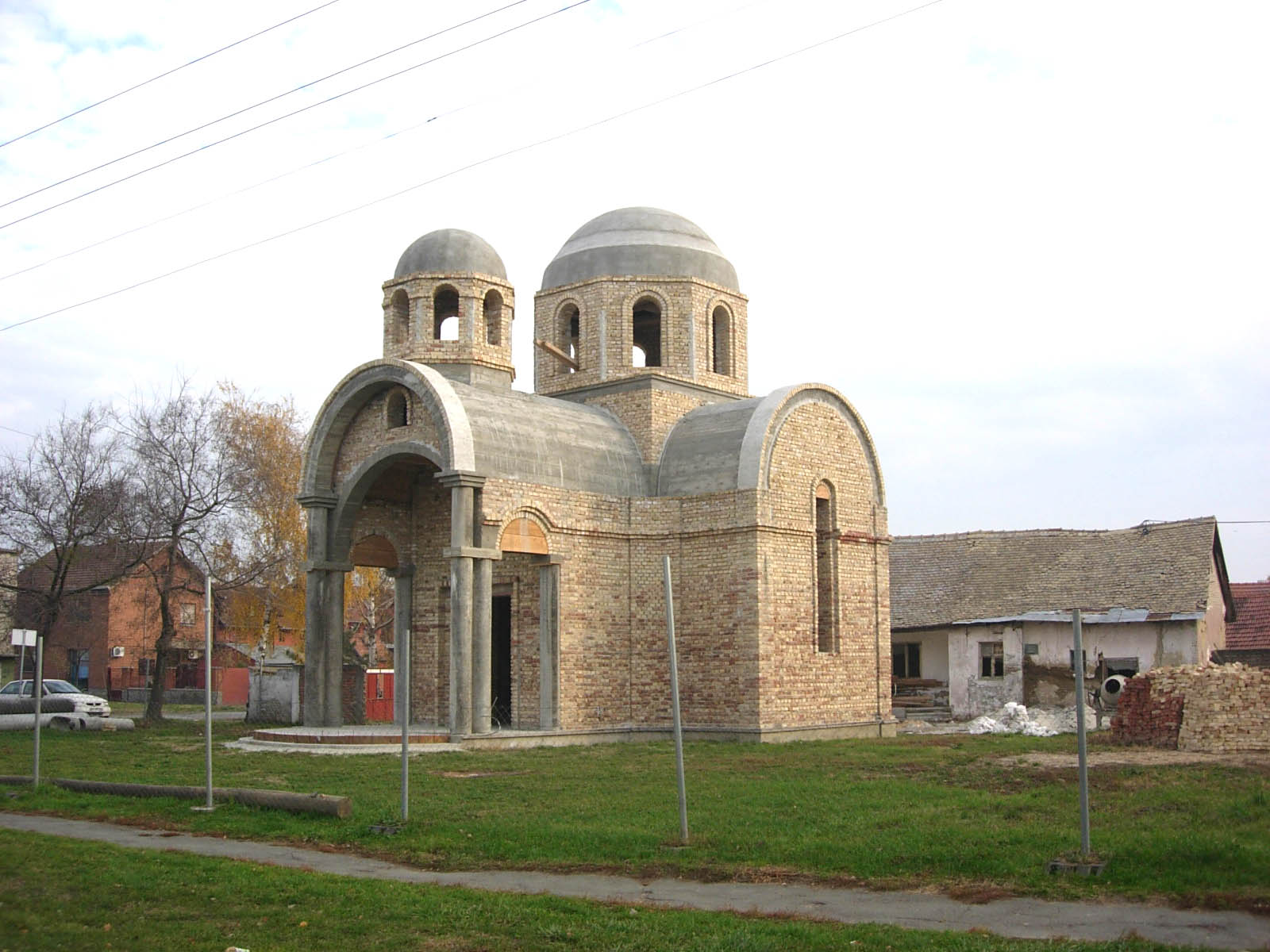
- Orthodox Church in Čonoplja

- Location within Vojvodina Location within Serbia Location within Europe
- Coordinates: 45°49′N 19°15′E
- Country: Serbia
- Province: Vojvodina
- Region: Bačka
- District: West Bačka
- Municipality: Sombor
- Established: 1747

Population (2002)
  - Total: 4,359
- Time zone: UTC+1 (CET)
  - Summer (DST): UTC+2 (CEST)

Čonoplja (Serbian Cyrillic: Чонопља) is a village in Serbia. It is situated in the Sombor municipality, in the West Bačka District, Vojvodina province. The village has a Serb ethnic majority and its population numbering 4,359 people (2002 census).

== Name ==
In Serbian, the village is known as Čonoplja (Чонопља), in German as Tschonopel, in Croatian as Čonoplja, in Bunjevac as Čonoplja, and in Hungarian as Csonoplya.

== History ==
The oldest relics found at this location are dated back to the late Stone Age. Relics from the 7th and 8th centuries were also found, but they give no exact indication as to the tribes who lived there.

The village was first mentioned in the 14th century as Conoklija, during the administration of the medieval Kingdom of Hungary. During the Ottoman administration (16th-17th century), the village of Čonoplja was populated by ethnic Serbs. In 1590, the village had 28 households.

In the 17th century, ethnic Bunjevci settled in the village, while in the 18th and 19th century Germans and Hungarians settled here as well. There was a census in Bačka in 1715, but Čonoplja was not mentioned. However 31 households were mentioned for Sivac, including a certain Teša Čonopljanin, aged 50 who was born in Čonoplja and had run away from the Turks in 1685; hence his surname. In 1747, population of Čonoplja counted 5 salaši (farms) with 42 people. They were Hungarians and Dalmatians of Catholic confession (Bunjevci).

A few German families could be found as early as in 1758. Shortly thereafter, however, they left for other neighboring villages. A Paul Witsch is mentioned, interviewed in connection with having stolen a horse, but acquitted of a charge. Freiherr Anton von Cothmann, a representative of Empress Maria Theresia, visited Čonoplja in 1767 and his assessment was not very complimentary. Bad houses, untidy streets and big neglected fields, but nice vineyards existed. He decided to propose the place for settlement by Germans. The plans in Vienna were to settle Protestant or Reformed Germans there. But this was dropped, as the Hungarians and Dalmatians (Bunjevci) who lived there, were all Roman Catholics.

On May 16, 1786, 109 German families were to settle in Čonoplja, but there were 119, all Catholics. The major part, approximately 30 families, came from Elsass and Lothringen today in France, and approximately 30 from the eastern part of Hunsrück, a mountain range south of Koblenz, Germany. From this time to the end of World War II, Čonoplja was trilingual. In 1803, the population of Čonoplja numbered 2,734 people.

The All Saints Church, still in existence, was built in 1819. Before this, a small church made of wood stood at the same place. Its interior is splendidly painted, 5 bells ring for the church. Its dimensions are 44 meters by 12 meters. At the edge of the Telečka hill, above the Calvary, there is the Antonius Chapel. The Calvary, with its 14 Stations of the Cross and statues of saints, was among the most beautiful in Bačka; it was built in 1878, with donations from the faithful. On each July 2 (Visitation of Mary) many of the faithful, including those from the surrounding villages, used to go on a pilgrimage to the Čonoplja Brünndl Chapel. The headstones at the cemetery were usually made of marble or artificial stone. Many families used to have a vault and in front of it, there was a column made of black Swedish marble, and a white cross was attached to its top. In 1869, the population of Čonoplja was 5,310, and had decreased to 4,536 by 1910. This was caused by emigration to America and other places. The railroad Sombor – Čonoplja – Krnjaja – Vrbas was opened on December 21, 1906. Electric power has been supplied to Čonoplja since 1921.

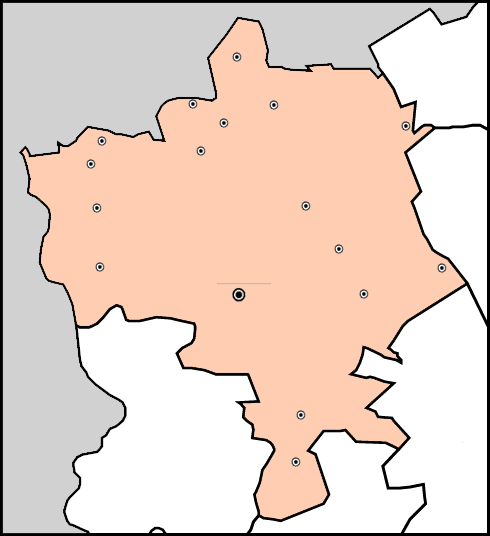

Although Čonoplja was a rather agricultural place, many priests, nuns, and teachers emerged. Many Danube Swabian farmers from Čonoplja owned a szállás (small farm outside the village). There was wine and fruit growing, hemp farmers and mills, fattening of pigs, and poultry breeding. The biggest farm within the boundaries of Čonoplja was the Kerschner farm with 1,200 jochs (approx. 692 hectares) of field. The village founded the following: A brickyard, construction tradesmen, construction materials store, clothing trade, hat maker, furrier, weaving mill, knitting business, timber processing and trading, cartwright, cooper, leather processing, electrician, metal processing, grocery store, butcher shop, bakery, confectioner, dairy, soft drink production, dyer, mills, fish farm, physician, drugstore, veterinarian, and savings bank. There was also a cinema and a spa on the road to Sombor. Many clubs, from firefighters to a soccer club, offered an opportunity for leisure time activities. There was also a library. A theatre group performed in regular intervals. The Subotica journal "Neven" wrote in early February 1921: "Čonoplja is a small, nicely equipped village in the Middle of the Bačka region". In 1940, the population of the village numbered 4,879 people, and included: 2,597 (53.45%) Germans, 1,442 (29.68%) Hungarians, 721 (14.84%) Croats, 38 (0.78%) Jews, 38 (0.78%) Serbs, 2 (0.04%) Slovaks, 2 (0.04%) Russians, 1 (0.02%) Romanians, 3 (0.06%) other Slavs, and 15 (0.31%) other non-Slavs.

The descendants of the Germans who settled in 1786 lost their homes, property, and often lives in WWII and its aftermath. On October 8 and 9 1944, more than 800 ethnic Germans fled from the village together with the withdrawing German army, fearing partisan reprisals and the imminent arrival of the Red Army. Those who stayed were expropriated and sent to Yugoslav concentration camps, where many of them were starved to death in the winter of 1945–1946. Most of the survivors were expelled from Yugoslavia. Descendants of the former ethnic German residents of Čonoplja are now widely scattered, with most living in Germany, Austria, and the United States. Among the Čonoplja Danube Swabians, about 330 people died as a direct or indirect result of WWII. Of these, 74 died in the Gakovo concentration camp, and another 126 in other Yugoslav camps or during the flight. 23 died as forced laborers after being deported to Stalino in Ukraine.

After World War II, the village was settled by more than 3,000 people who originated from area around Slunj, Vrginmost and Cazin.

== Ethnic groups (2002 census) ==
- Serbs = 3,093 (70.96%)
- Hungarians = 668 (15.33%)
- Yugoslavs = 160 (3.67%)
- Croats = 129 (2.96%)
- Bunjevci = 113 (2.59%)
- Others.

== Historical population ==
- 1961: 5,546
- 1971: 5,109
- 1981: 4,749
- 1991: 4,432
- 2002: 4,359

== Culture ==
There are 3 cultural-artistic societies in the village: "KUD Vuk Karadžić", "KUD Bunjevačka grana", and "KUD Arany Janoš".

== Gallery ==
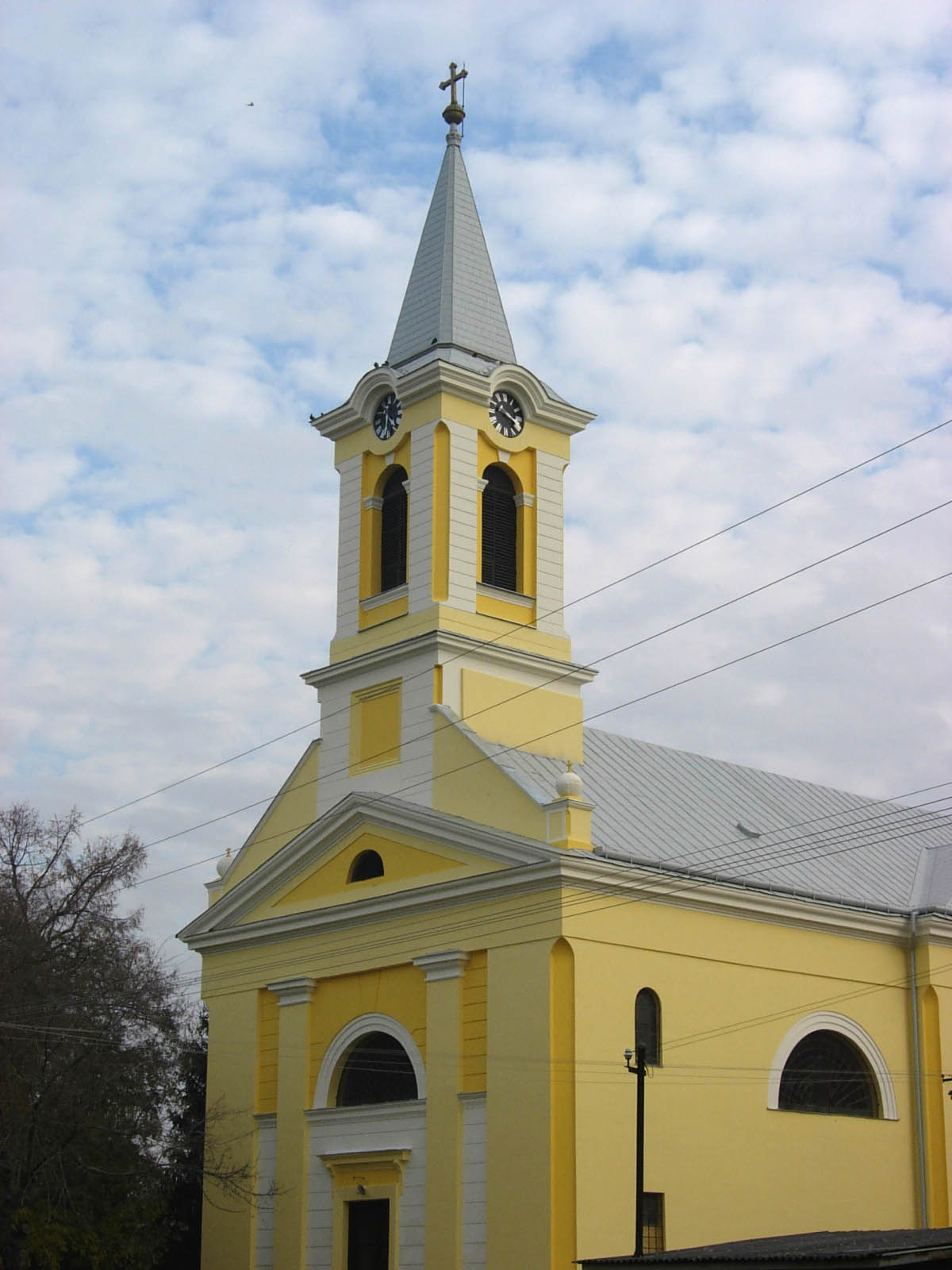
The All Saints Catholic Church

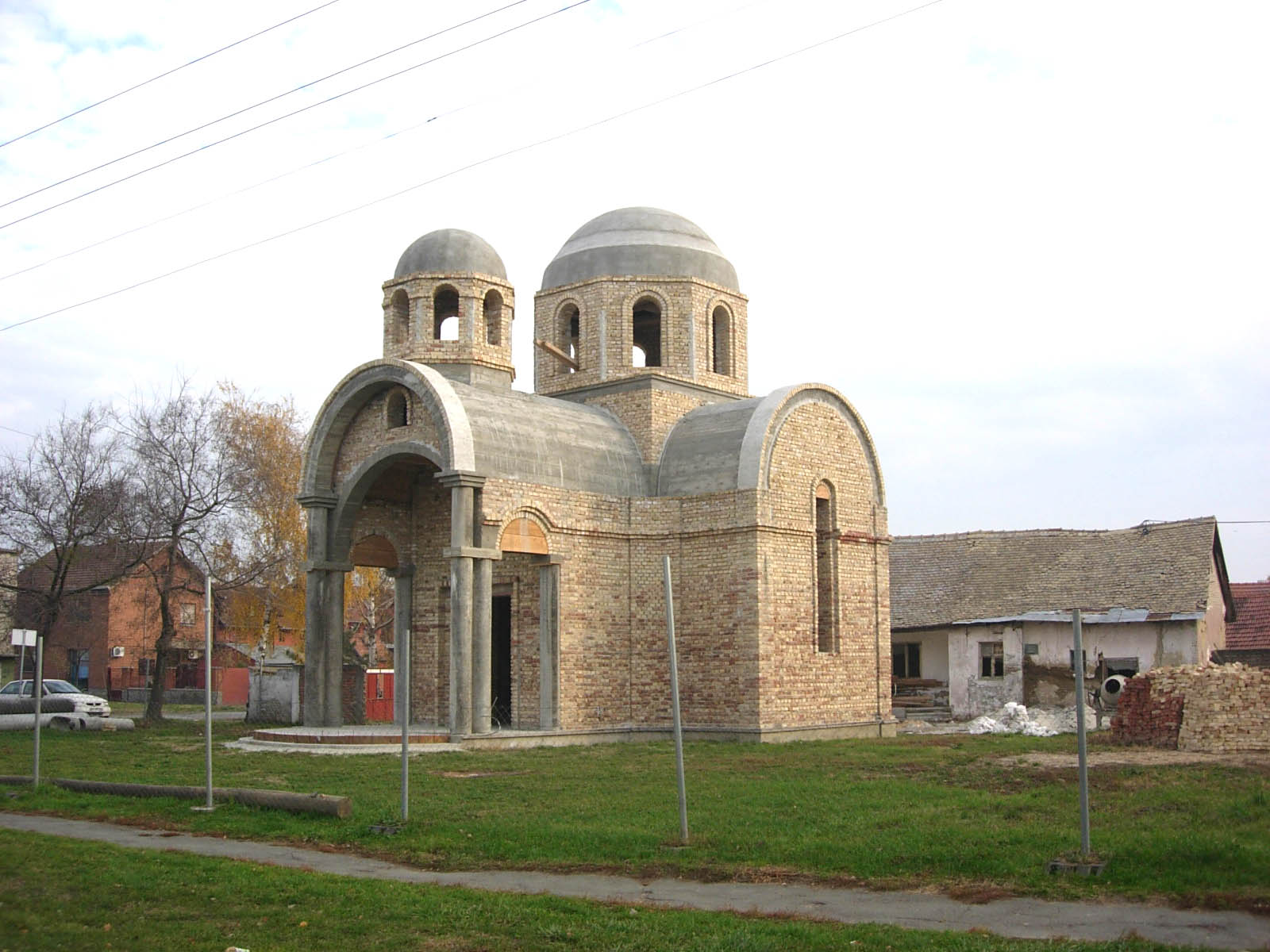
Conoplja, Orthodox Church

== See also ==
- List of places in Serbia
- List of cities, towns and villages in Vojvodina
