= Adžine Livade =

Adžine Livade Аџине Ливаде (Serbian)
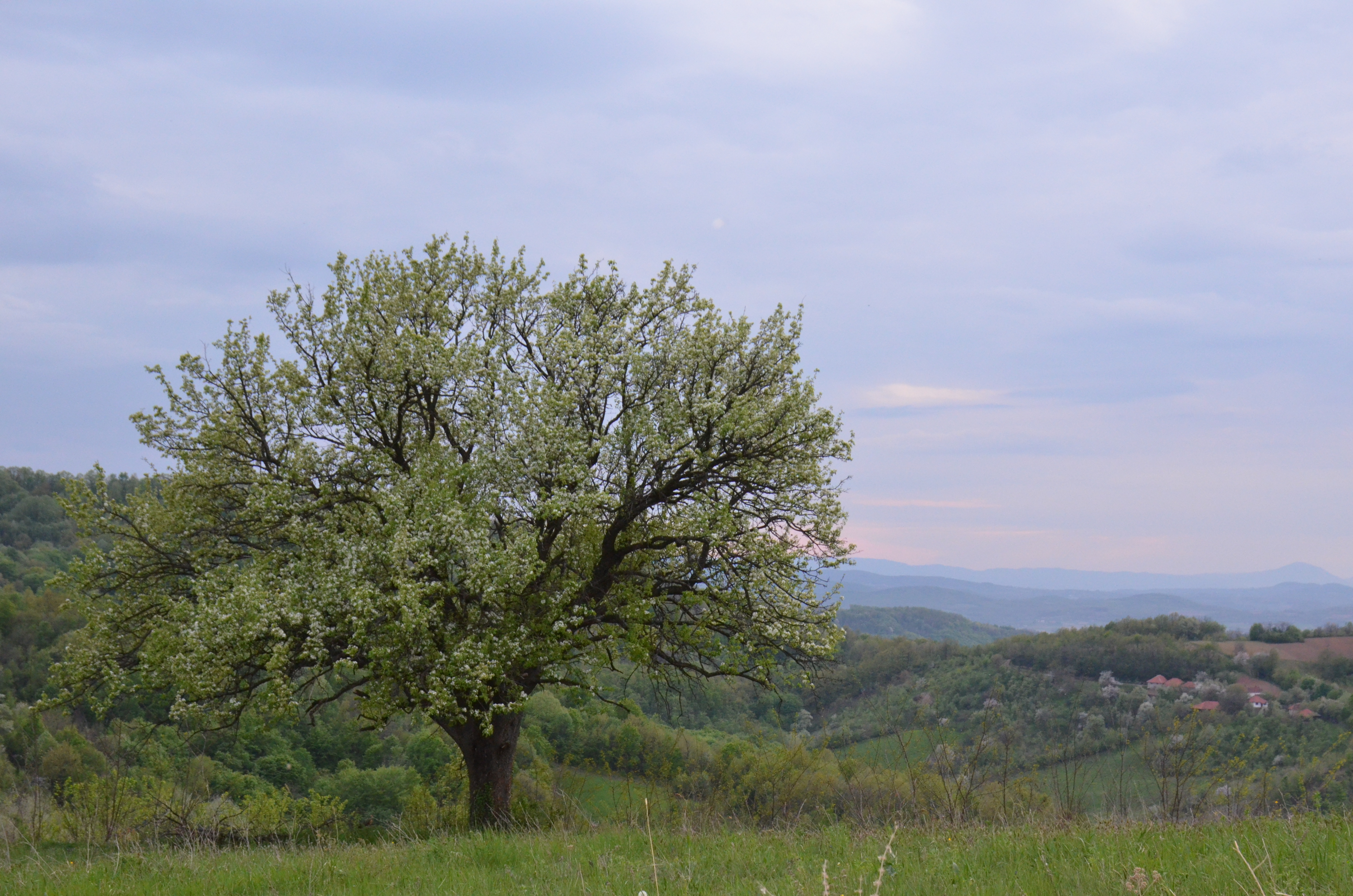
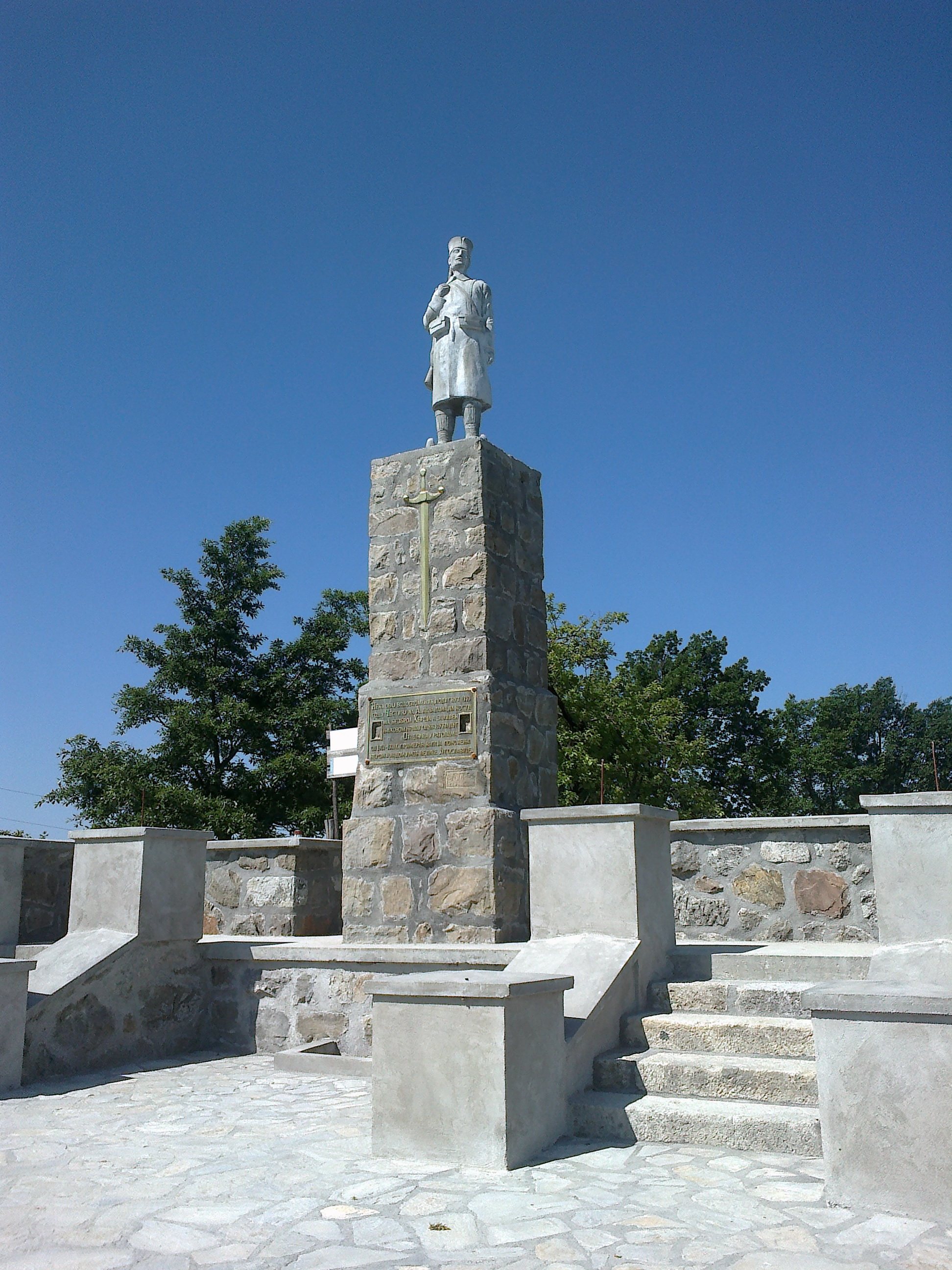

- Location in Serbia
- Coordinates: 43°54′14″N 20°52′20″E
- Country: Serbia
- Region: Šumadija
- District: Šumadija District
- Municipality: Stanovo

Adžine Livade (Serbian: Аџине Ливаде) is a village in the Kragujevac municipality in the Šumadija District of central Serbia.
