= Sirča =

Coordinates: 43°44′N 20°43′E

Sirča Сирча (Serbian)
- Village (Selo)
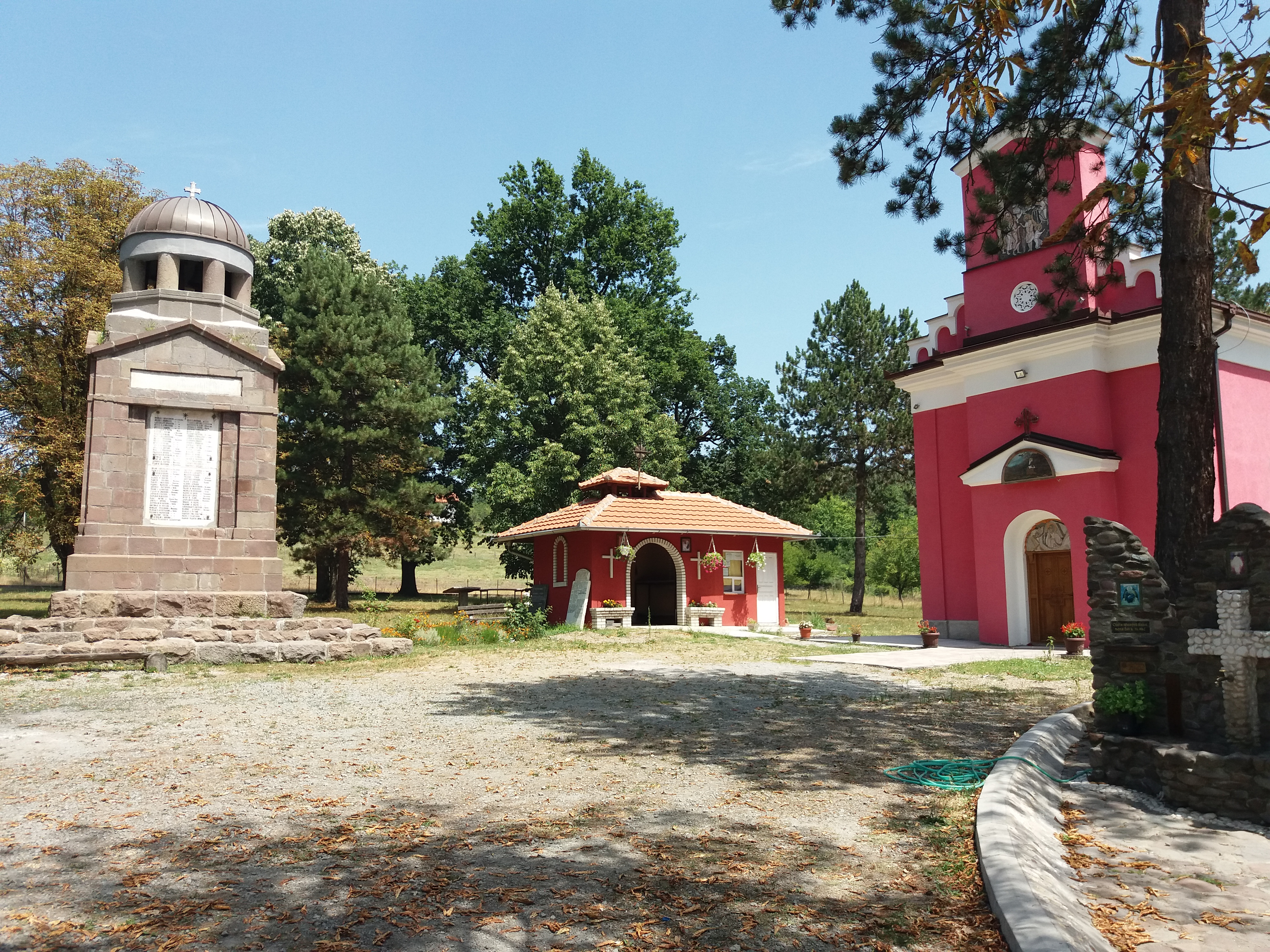
- Interactive map of Sirča
- Country: Serbia
- District: Raška District
- Municipality: Kraljevo
- Time zone: UTC+1 (CET)
  - Summer (DST): UTC+2 (CEST)

Sirča is a village situated in Kraljevo municipality in Serbia.
