= Golubinci railway station =

Railway station in Serbia

Coordinates: 45°0′59″N 20°3′5″E

Golubinci railway station Железничка станица Голубинци

General information
- Location: Serbia
- Tracks: 5
Location

Golubinci railway station (Serbian: Железничка станица Голубинци) is a railway station on Belgrade–Šid railway. Located in Golubinci, Stara Pazova, Serbia. Railroad continued to Putinci in one, in the other direction to Stara Pazova and the third direction towards Inđija. Golubinci railway station consists of 5 railway tracks.

== See also ==
- Serbian Railways
