= Voluja =

- Village
- Location within Serbia
- Coordinates: 44°29′19″N 21°46′19″E
- Country: Serbia
- District: Braničevo District
- Municipality: Kučevo

Population (2002)
  - Total: 1,123
- Time zone: UTC+1 (CET)
  - Summer (DST): UTC+2 (CEST)

Voluja is a village in the municipality of Kučevo, Serbia. According to the 2002 census, the village has a population of 1123 people.
