= Batušinac =

Batušinac Батушинац
- Village
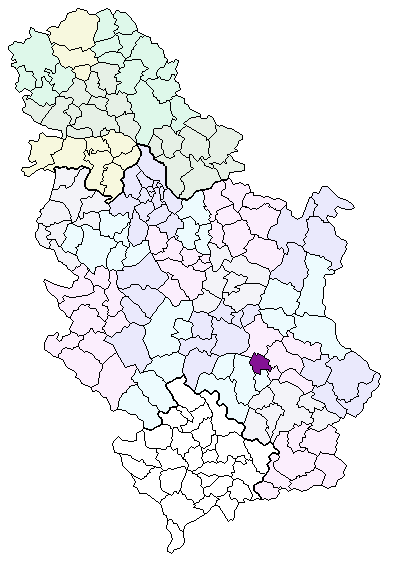
- Location of Merošina municipality in Serbia

- Location within Serbia
- Country: Serbia
- District: Nišava
- Municipality: Merošina

Population (2002)
  - Total: 830
- Time zone: UTC+1 (CET)
  - Summer (DST): UTC+2 (CEST)

Batušinac is a village in Serbia in the municipality Merošina in Nisava district. According to the 2002 census, the population was 830 (according to the census of 1991, there were 840 inhabitants).

== Demographics ==
In the village Batušinac live 667 adult inhabitants, and the average age is 41.7 years (42.3 for men and 41.1 for women). The village has 202 households, and the average number of people per household is 4.11. This village is largely populated by Serbs (according to the census of 2002).
