= Nova Pazova railway station =

Railway station in Serbia

Coordinates: 44°56′15″N 20°12′35″E

Nova Pazova railway station Нова Пазова
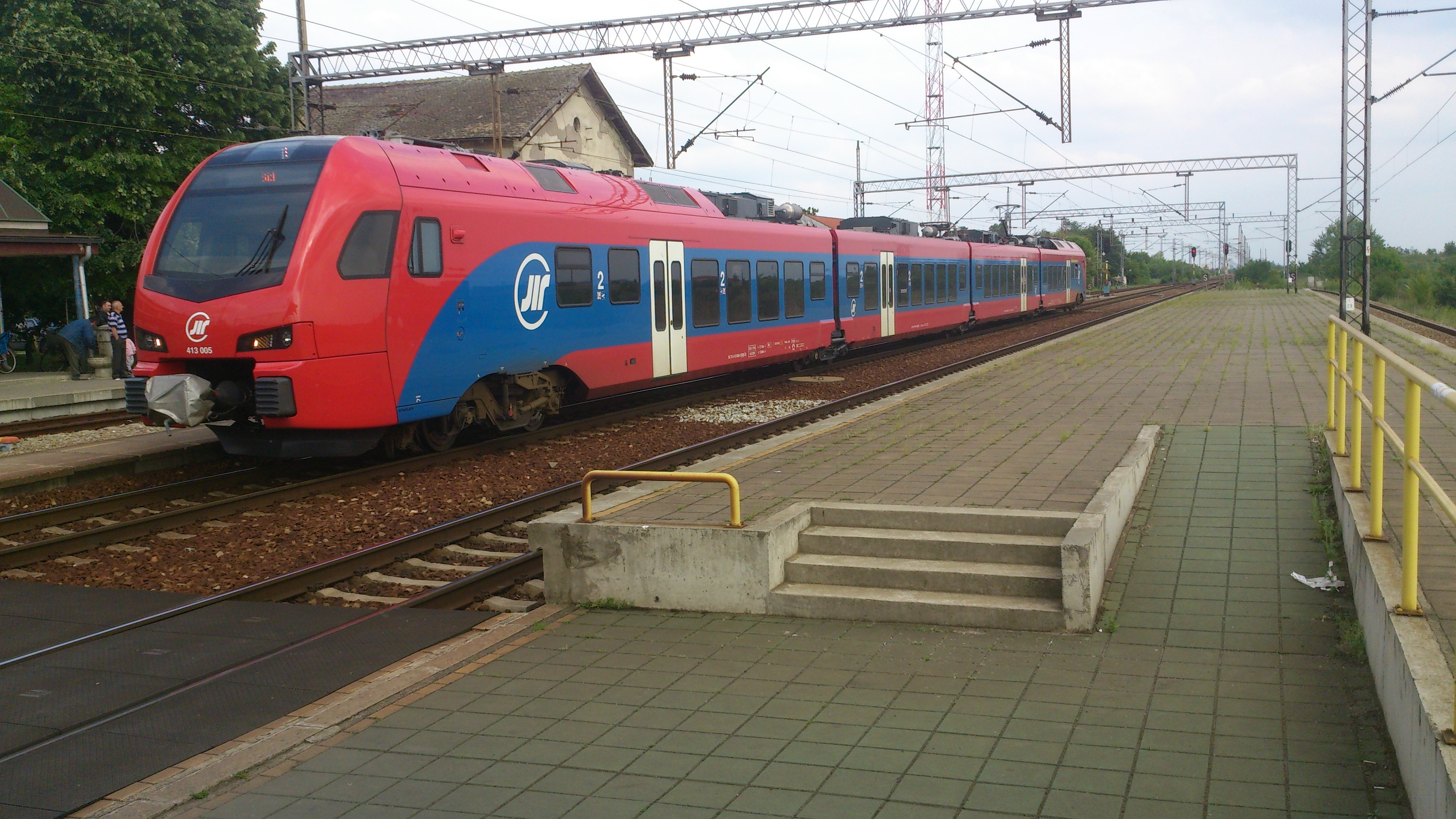
- A train stopped at Nova Pazova railway station.

General information
- Location: Serbia
- Tracks: 5
Location

Nova Pazova railway station (Serbian: Нова Пазова) is a railway station in Nova Pazova, Stara Pazova, Serbia. Tracks extend from the station toward Stara Pazova in the northwest and Batajnica in the southeast. The station consists of 5 railway tracks.

== See also ==
- Serbian Railways
- Beovoz
