= Veliki Jovanovac =

- Village
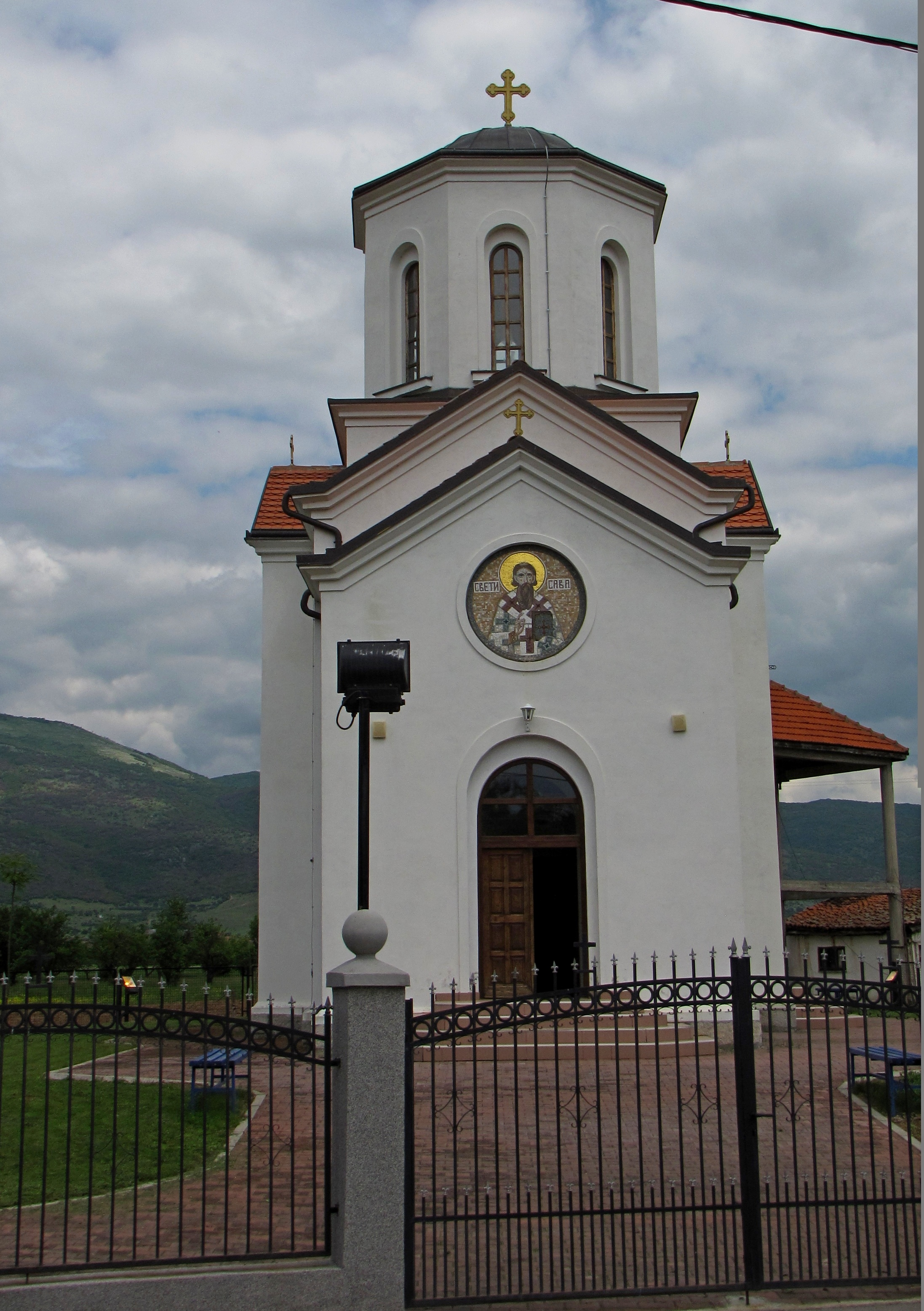
- The church of Saint Sava in Veliki Jovanovac

- Location within Serbia
- Coordinates: 43°06′39″N 22°38′56″E
- Country: Serbia
- Region: Southern and Eastern Serbia
- District: Pirot
- Municipality: Pirot

Population (2002)
  - Total: 395
- Time zone: UTC+1 (CET)
  - Summer (DST): UTC+2 (CEST)

Veliki Jovanovac is a village in the municipality of Pirot, Serbia. According to the 2002 census, the village has a population of 395 people.
