= Vranovo =

- Village (Selo)
- Location within Serbia
- Coordinates: 44°36′04″N 20°59′40″E
- Country: Serbia
- District: Podunavlje District
- Municipality: Smederevo

Population (2022)
  - Total: 2,456
- Time zone: UTC+1 (CET)
  - Summer (DST): UTC+2 (CEST)

Vranovo is a village in the municipality of Smederevo, Serbia. According to the 2002 census, the village has a population of 2682 people.
