= Putinci railway station =

Railway station in Serbia

Coordinates: 44°58′47″N 19°57′43″E

Putinci railway station Железничка станица Путинци

General information
- Location: Serbia
- Tracks: 5
Location

Putinci railway station (Serbian: Железничка станица Путинци) is a railway station on Belgrade–Šid railway. Located in Putinci, Ruma, Serbia. Railroad continued to Ruma in one and the other direction to Golubinci. Putinci railway station consists of 5 railway track.

== See also ==
- Serbian Railways
