= Lastras del Pozo =

- Municipality
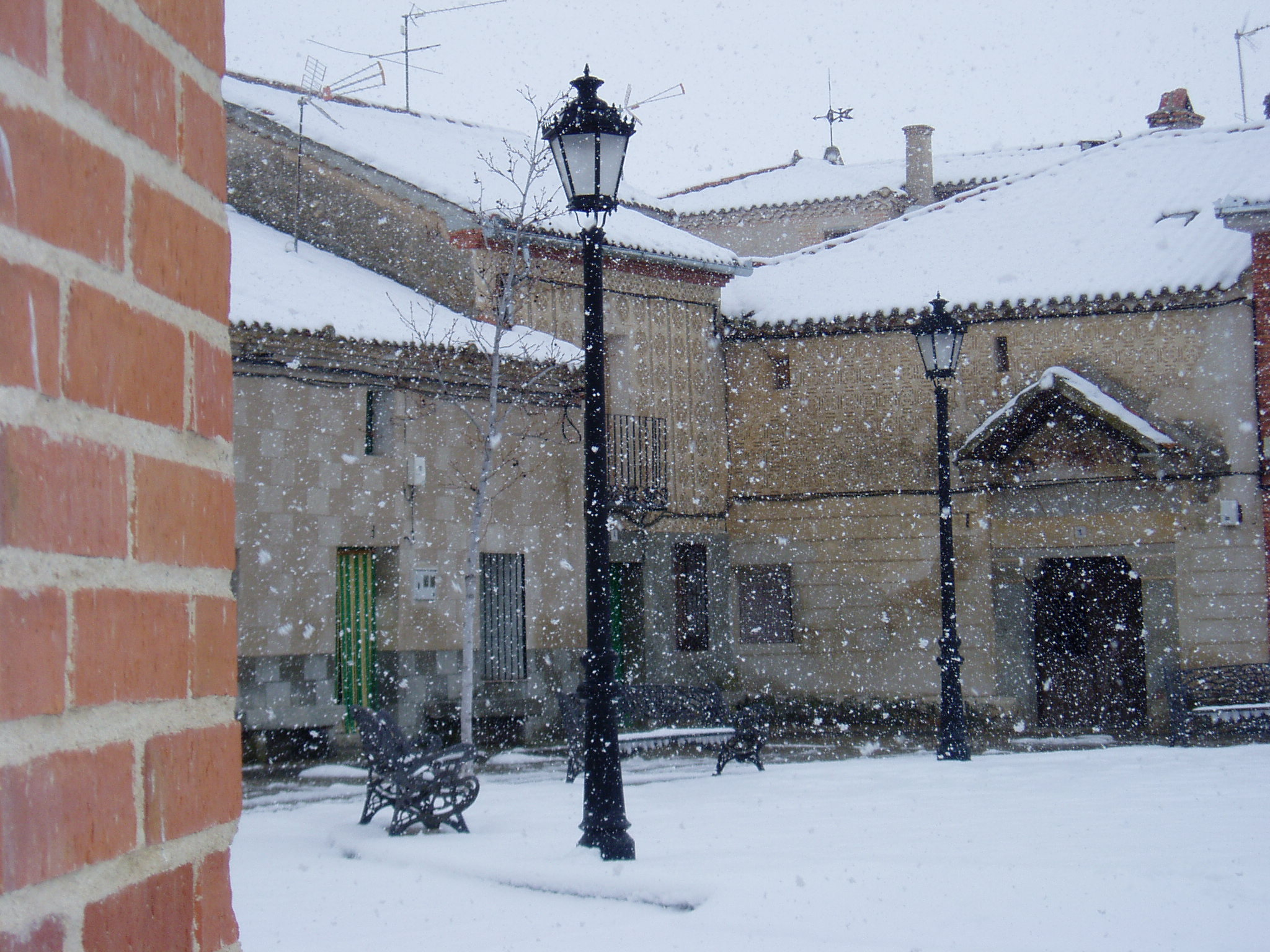
- Lastras del Pozo square, with snow

- Flag Coat of arms

- Location in Spain. Lastras del Pozo (Spain)
- Coordinates: 40°52′45″N 4°20′45″W
- Country: Spain
- Autonomous community: Castile and León
- Province: Segovia
- Municipality: Lastras del Pozo

Area
  - Total: 32.51 km^{2} (12.55 sq mi)

Population (2025-01-01)
  - Total: 55
  - Density: 1.7/km^{2} (4.4/sq mi)
- Time zone: UTC+1 (CET)
  - Summer (DST): UTC+2 (CEST)
- Website: Official website

Lastras del Pozo is a municipality located in the province of Segovia, Castile and León, Spain. According to the 2004 census (INE), the municipality had a population of 83 inhabitants.
