= Kukići =

- Village
- Location within Serbia
- Coordinates: 43°49′56″N 20°28′05″E
- Country: Serbia
- District: Moravica District
- Municipality: Čačak

Area
  - Total: 8.15 km^{2} (3.15 sq mi)
- Elevation: 199 m (653 ft)

Population (2011)
  - Total: 490
  - Density: 60/km^{2} (160/sq mi)
- Time zone: UTC+1 (CET)
  - Summer (DST): UTC+2 (CEST)

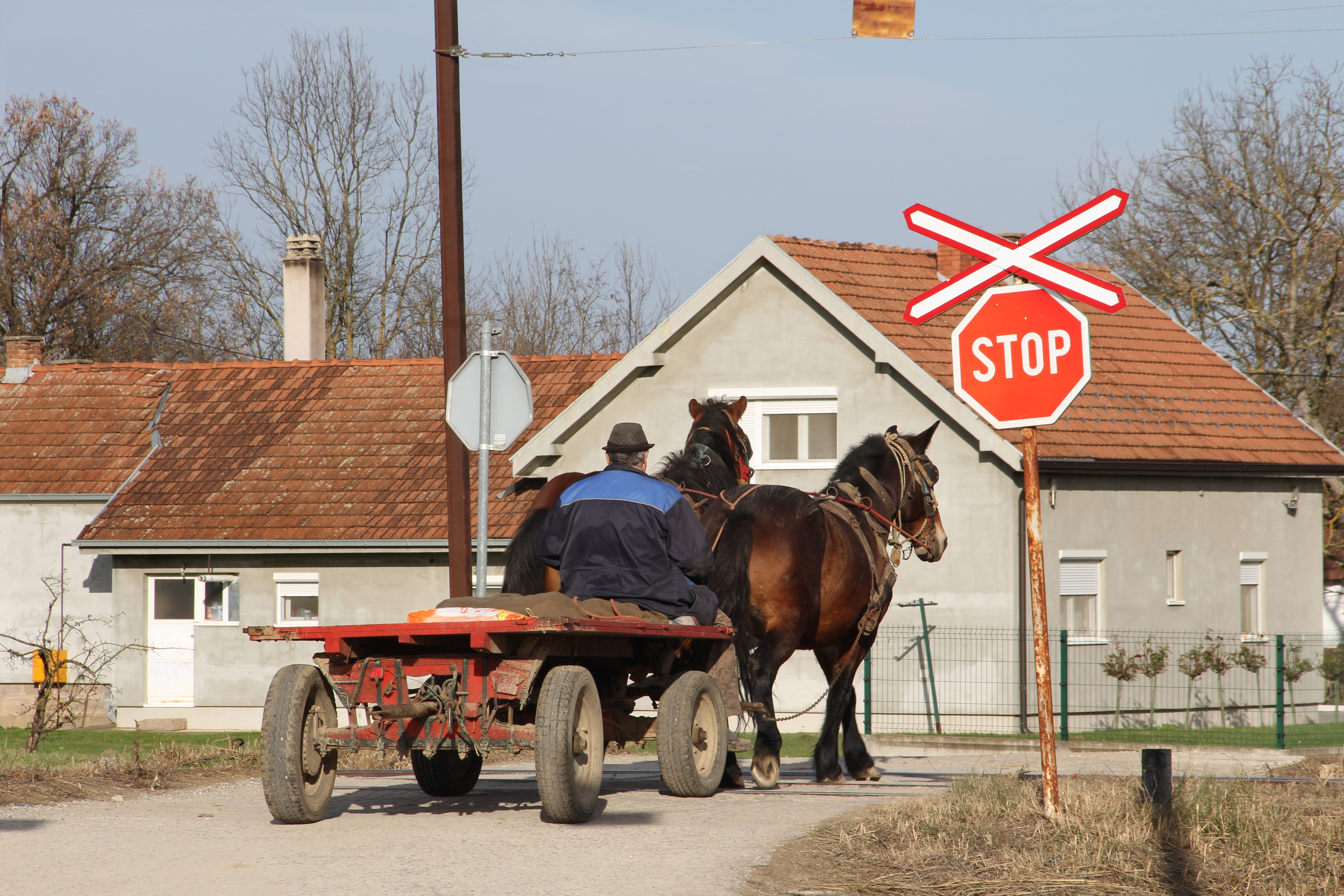
Village of Kukici, City of Cacak, Serbia.

Kukići (Serbian Cyrillic: Кукићи) is a village in the municipality of Čačak, Serbia. According to the 2011 census, the village has a population of 490 people.
