= Lučina, Serbia =

Lučina (Ćićevac)
- Village
- Location within Serbia
- Coordinates: 43°41′N 21°26′E
- Country: Serbia
- District: Rasina District
- Municipality: Ćićevac

Population (2002)
  - Total: 927
- Time zone: UTC+1 (CET)
  - Summer (DST): UTC+2 (CEST)

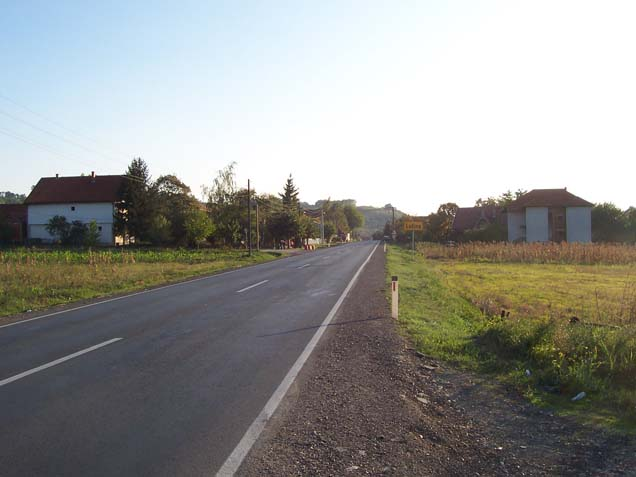

Lučina is a village in the municipality of Ćićevac, Serbia. According to the 2002 census, the village has a population of 927 people.
