= Anselmo Lastra =

American computer scientist

Anselmo A. Lastra is an American computer scientist, a professor and the former Chair of the Computer Science Department at the University of North Carolina at Chapel Hill. His research interests are in the areas of 3D computer graphics, graphics hardware architectures, and virtual reality.

Lastra received a BS in electrical engineering from the Georgia Institute of Technology, and MA and PhD degrees in computer science from Duke University. He has chaired a number of conferences, including I3D 2005 and Graphics Hardware 2002 and 2004, and served as associate editor of the IEEE Transactions on Visualization and Computer Graphics and IEEE Computer Graphics and Applications.

Lastra's major contributions are in hardware-based programmable shading and in the use of graphics hardware for general purpose computing (a technique known as GPGPU). The 1998 dissertation research "A Programmable Pipeline for Graphics Hardware". of his student Marc Olano was on the use of a high-level language for real-time programmable shading on graphics hardware, now a common feature of GPUs. The early work was on PixelFlow, the experimental graphics computer developed at the University of North Carolina at Chapel Hill.

A 2002 paper coauthored with his student Mark Harris and titled Physically-Based Visual Simulation on Graphics Hardware, led to the coining of the term GPGPU and to extensive research in that field.
