= Drača =

Coordinates: 44°02′N 20°48′E

Drača Драча (Serbian)
- Village
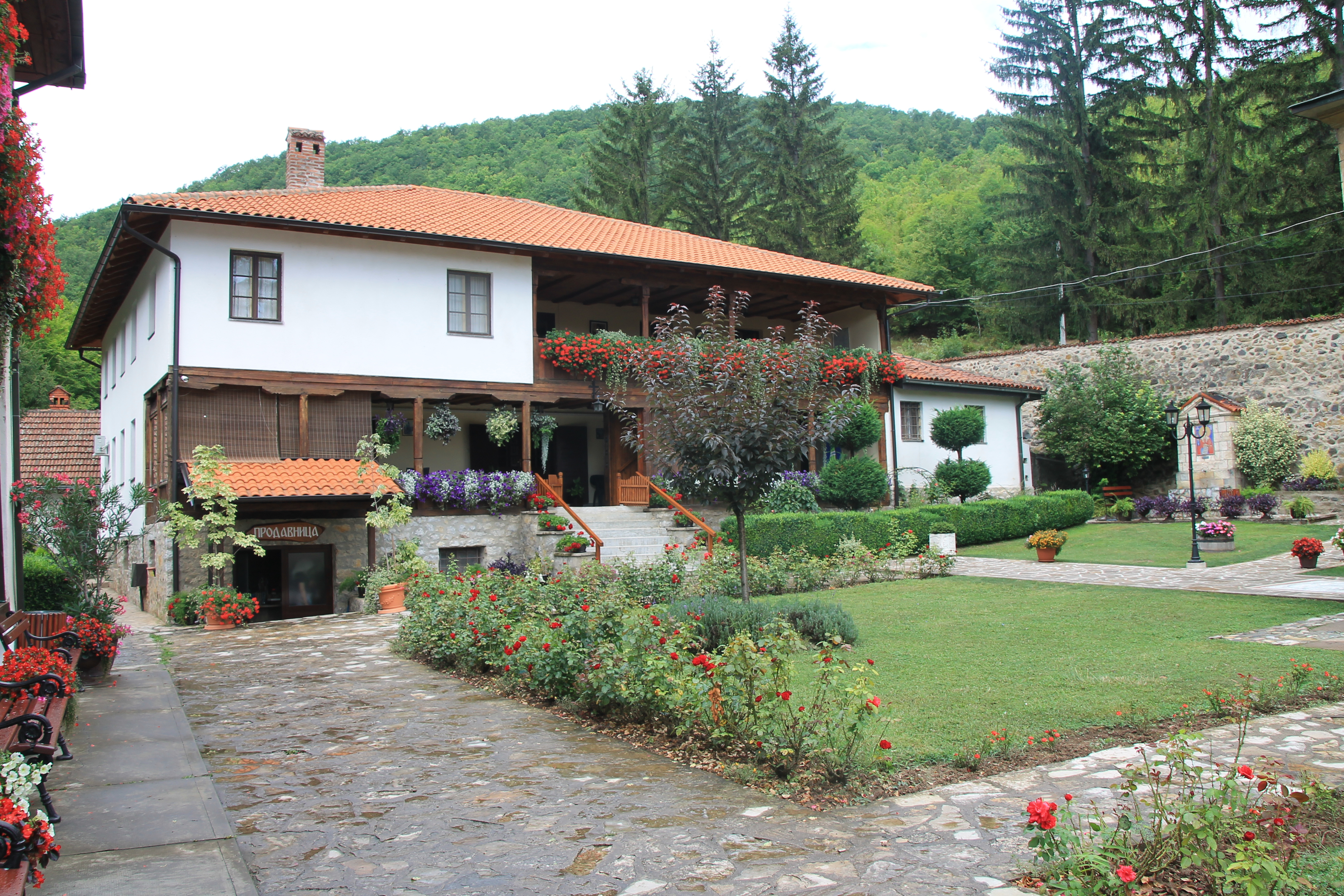
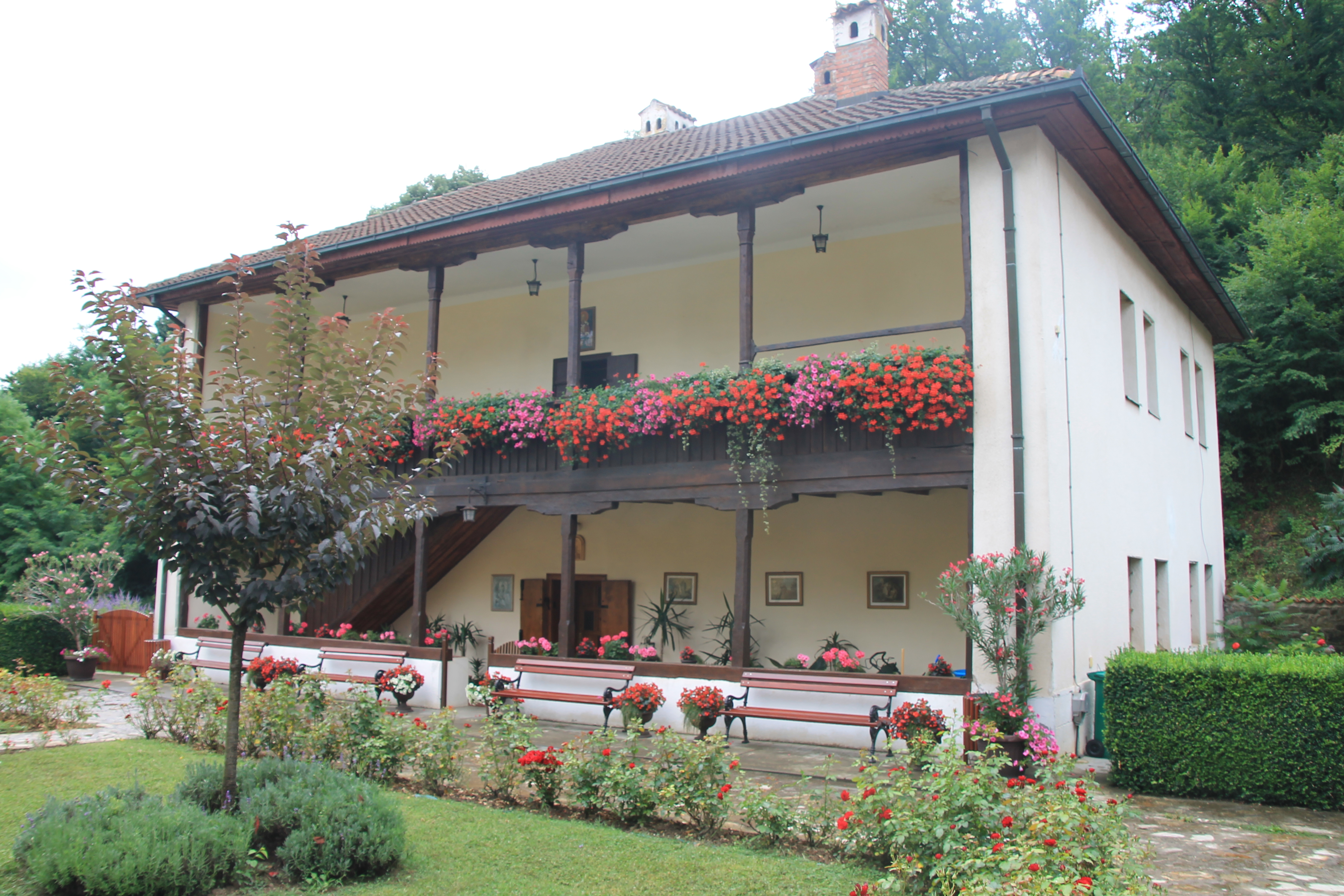
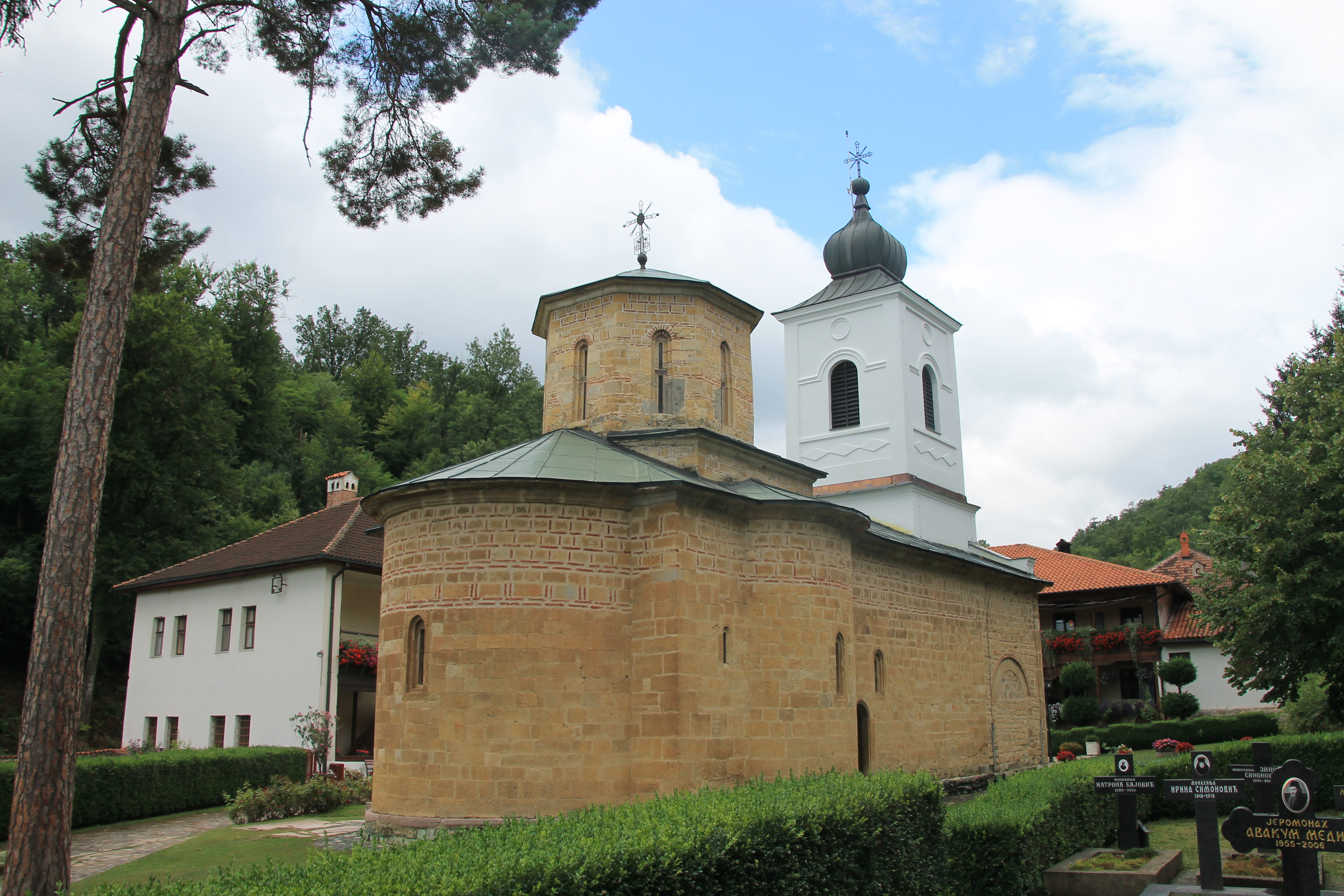
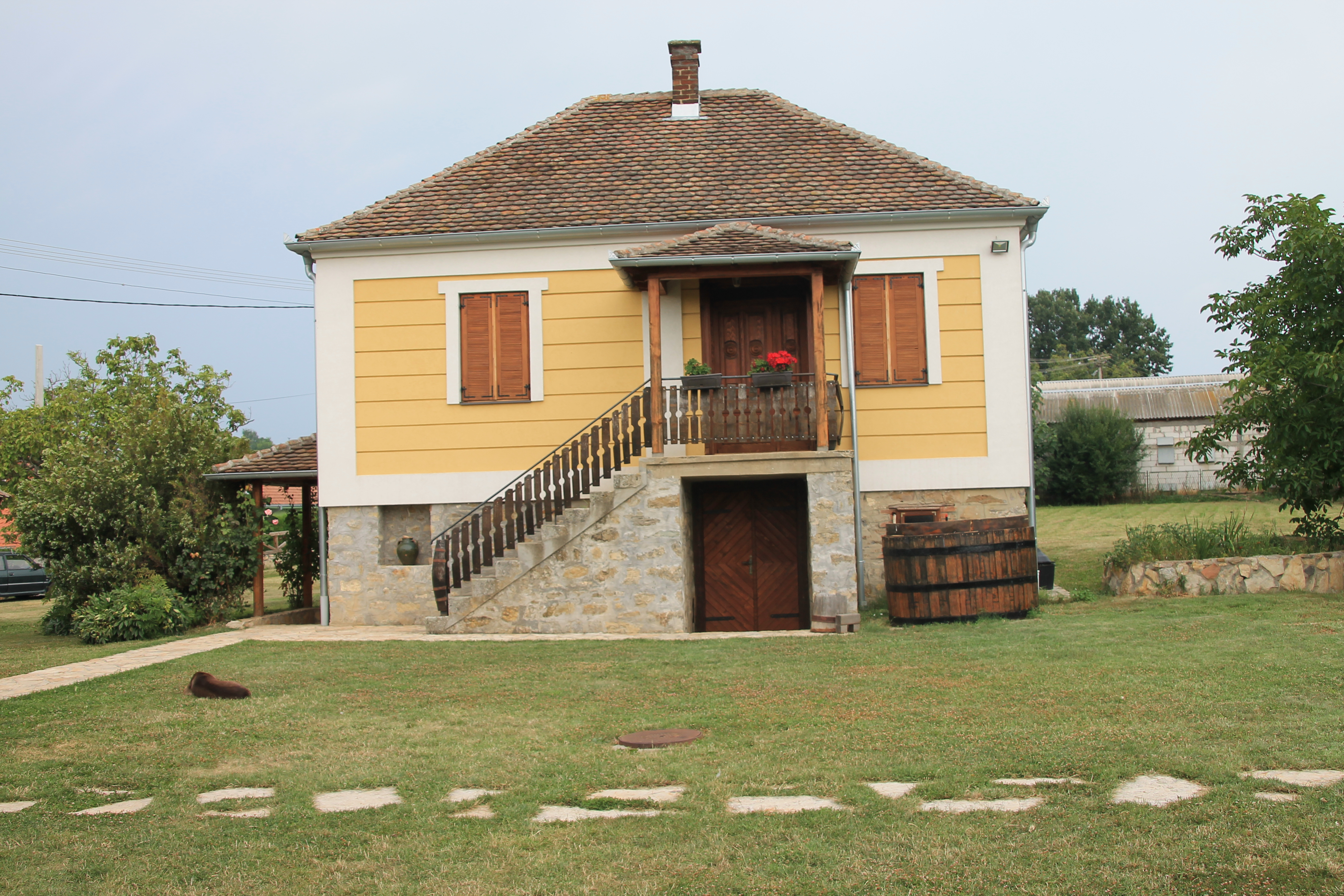
- Interactive map of Drača
- Country: Serbia
- District: Šumadija District
- Municipality: Stanovo

Population (2011)
  - Total: 911
- Time zone: UTC+1 (CET)
  - Summer (DST): UTC+2 (CEST)

Drača (Serbian: Драча) is a village in the municipality of Stanovo, Serbia. According to the preliminary results of the 2011 census, the village has a population of 911 people. In the domain of the village, about 7 kilometres from the centre of the city of Kragujevac, the geographical centre of Serbia is located.
