= Stara Pazova railway station =

Railway station in Serbia

Coordinates: 44°59′14″N 20°8′13″E

Stara Pazova railway station Железничка станица Стара Пазова
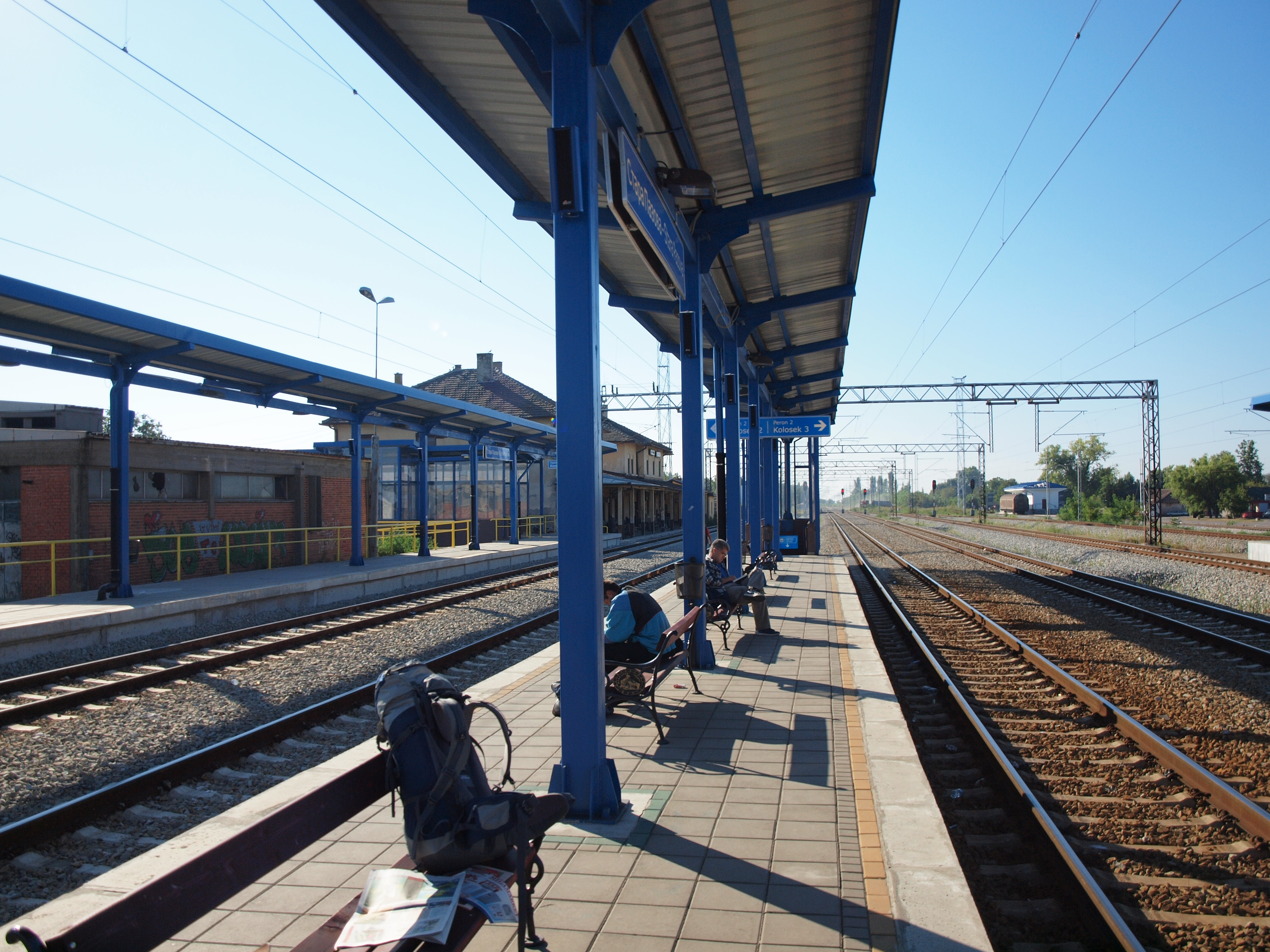
- Platform at Stara Pazova railway station.

General information
- Location: Serbia
- Tracks: 6
Location

Stara Pazova railway station (Serbian: Железничка станица Стара Пазова, Železnička stanica Stara Pazova) is a railway station in Stara Pazova, Serbia. The railroad continues to Inđija in one direction, to Nova Pazova in the other and in the third direction towards Golubinci. The Stara Pazova railway station consists of 6 railway tracks.

== See also ==
- Serbian Railways
- Beovoz
