= Mršinci =

- Village
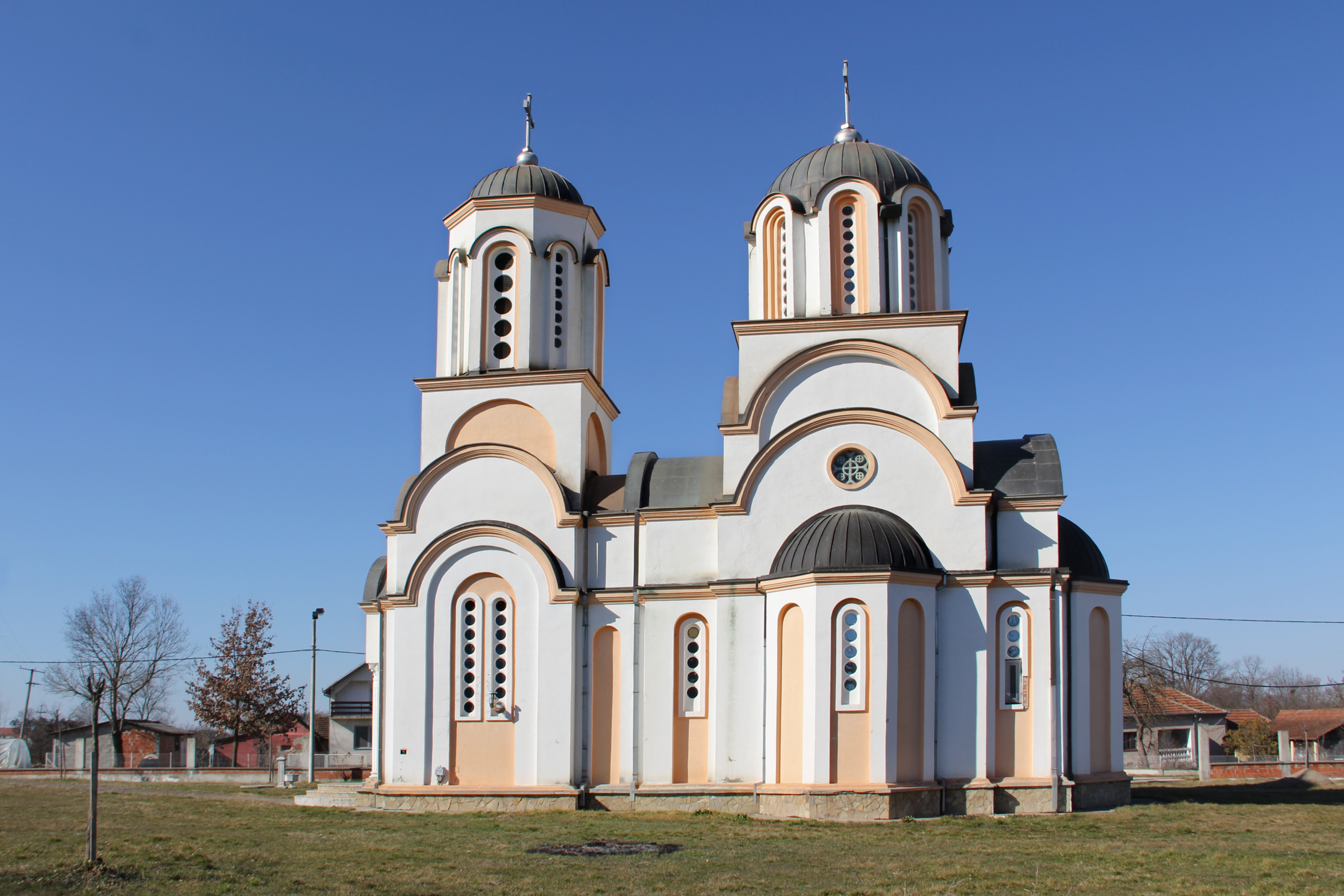
- Church of the Holy Trinity, Mrsinci (Cacak), Serbia

- Location within Serbia
- Coordinates: 43°48′15″N 20°29′31″E
- Country: Serbia
- District: Moravica District
- Municipality: Čačak

Area
  - Total: 12.22 km^{2} (4.72 sq mi)
- Elevation: 196 m (643 ft)

Population (2011)
  - Total: 1,264
  - Density: 103.4/km^{2} (267.9/sq mi)
- Time zone: UTC+1 (CET)
  - Summer (DST): UTC+2 (CEST)

Mršinci (Serbian Cyrillic: Мршинци) is a village in the municipality of Čačak, Serbia. According to the 2011 census, the village has a population of 1,264 people.
