= Dragobraća =

Coordinates: 43°58′38″N 20°49′27″E

Dragobraća Драгобраћа (Serbian)
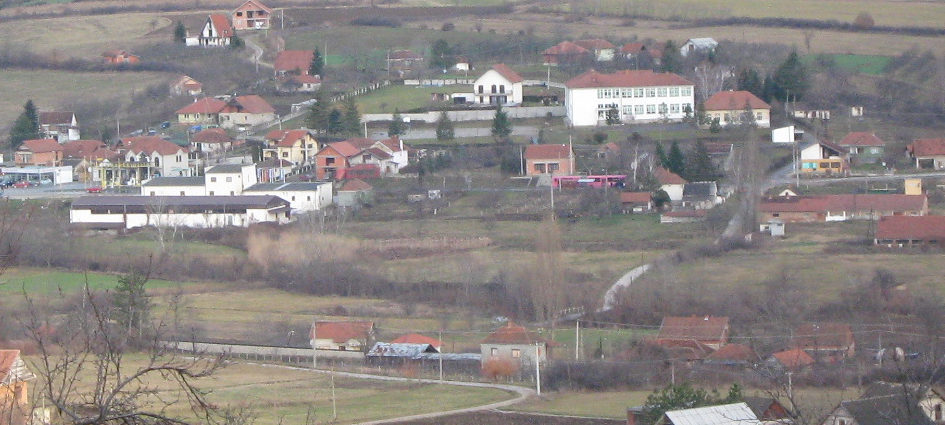
- Interactive map of Dragobraća
- Country: Serbia
- Time zone: UTC+1 (CET)
  - Summer (DST): UTC+2 (CEST)

Dragobraća (Cyrillic: Драгобраћа ) is a settlement located in the Stanovo municipality, in the Šumadija District of Serbia.

The population of the village is 845 (2002 census).
