= Babin Potok, Prokuplje =

Coordinates: 43°13′N 21°37′E

Babin Potok Бабин Поток (Serbian)
- Village
- Interactive map of Babin Potok
- Country: Serbia
- District: Toplica District
- Municipality: Prokuplje

Population (2002)
  - Total: 674
- Time zone: UTC+1 (CET)
  - Summer (DST): UTC+2 (CEST)

Babin Potok is a village in the municipality of Prokuplje, Serbia. According to the 2002 census, the village has a population of 674 people.
