= Grošnica =

Grošnica Грошница (Serbian)
- Village
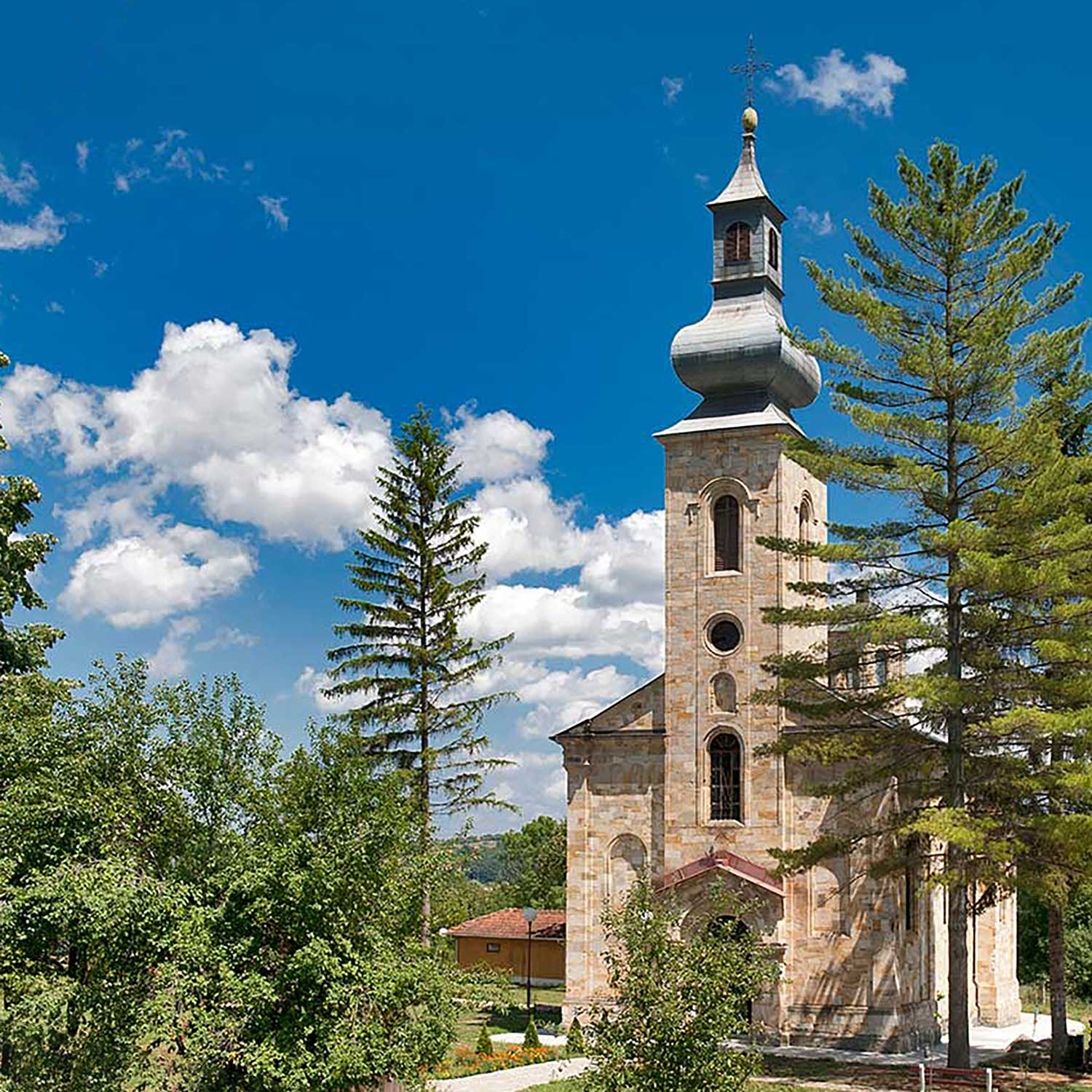

- Location within Serbia
- Coordinates: 43°57′20″N 20°52′30″E
- Country: Serbia
- District: Šumadija District
- Municipality: Stanovo

Population (2002)
  - Total: 1,280
- Time zone: UTC+1 (CET)
  - Summer (DST): UTC+2 (CEST)

Grošnica (Serbian: Грошница) is a village in the municipality of Stanovo, Serbia. According to the 2002 census, the village has a population of 1280 people.
