= Goločelo, Kragujevac =

Goločelo Голочело (Serbian)
- Village
- Location within Serbia
- Coordinates: 43°57′02″N 20°49′03″E
- Country: Serbia
- District: Šumadija District
- City: Kragujevac

Population (2011)
  - Total: 520
- Time zone: UTC+1 (CET)
  - Summer (DST): UTC+2 (CEST)

Goločelo (Serbian: Голочело) is a village in the city area of Kragujevac, Serbia. According to the 2011 census, the village has a population of 520 people.
