= Kutlovo, Kragujevac =

Kutlovo Кутлово (Serbian)
- Village
- Location within Serbia
- Coordinates: 44°03′N 20°45′E
- Country: Serbia
- District: Šumadija District
- City: Kragujevac

Population (2011)
  - Total: 234
- Time zone: UTC+1 (CET)
  - Summer (DST): UTC+2 (CEST)

Kutlovo (Serbian: Кутлово) is a village in the Kragujevac city area in the Šumadija District, Serbia. According to the 2011 census there were 234 inhabitants.
