= Aynard Smaragd =

Hungarian nobleman

Ispán of Valkó
- Reign: 1244–1246
- Predecessor: Endre Németi
- Successor: Lawrence
- Died: after 1258
- Noble family: gens Smaragd
- Issue: John; Nicholas I Smaragd IV
- Father: Smaragd II

Aynard from the kindred Smaragd (Hungarian: Smaragd nembeli Ajnárd; fl. 1244–1258) was a Hungarian distinguished nobleman in the 13th century, who held positions during the reign of King Béla IV of Hungary.

== Background ==
Aynard (also Ainard, Einard or Eynardus) was born into the gens (clan) Smaragd, a noble family of French origin. His father was Smaragd (II), who served as Judge royal (1205–1206) then briefly Voivode of Transylvania (1206) during the reign of Andrew II. Aynard had two brothers, Smaragd (III), who was Archbishop of Kalocsa and Gilét (I), who was count of the tárnoks ("comes udvornicorum").

== Career ==
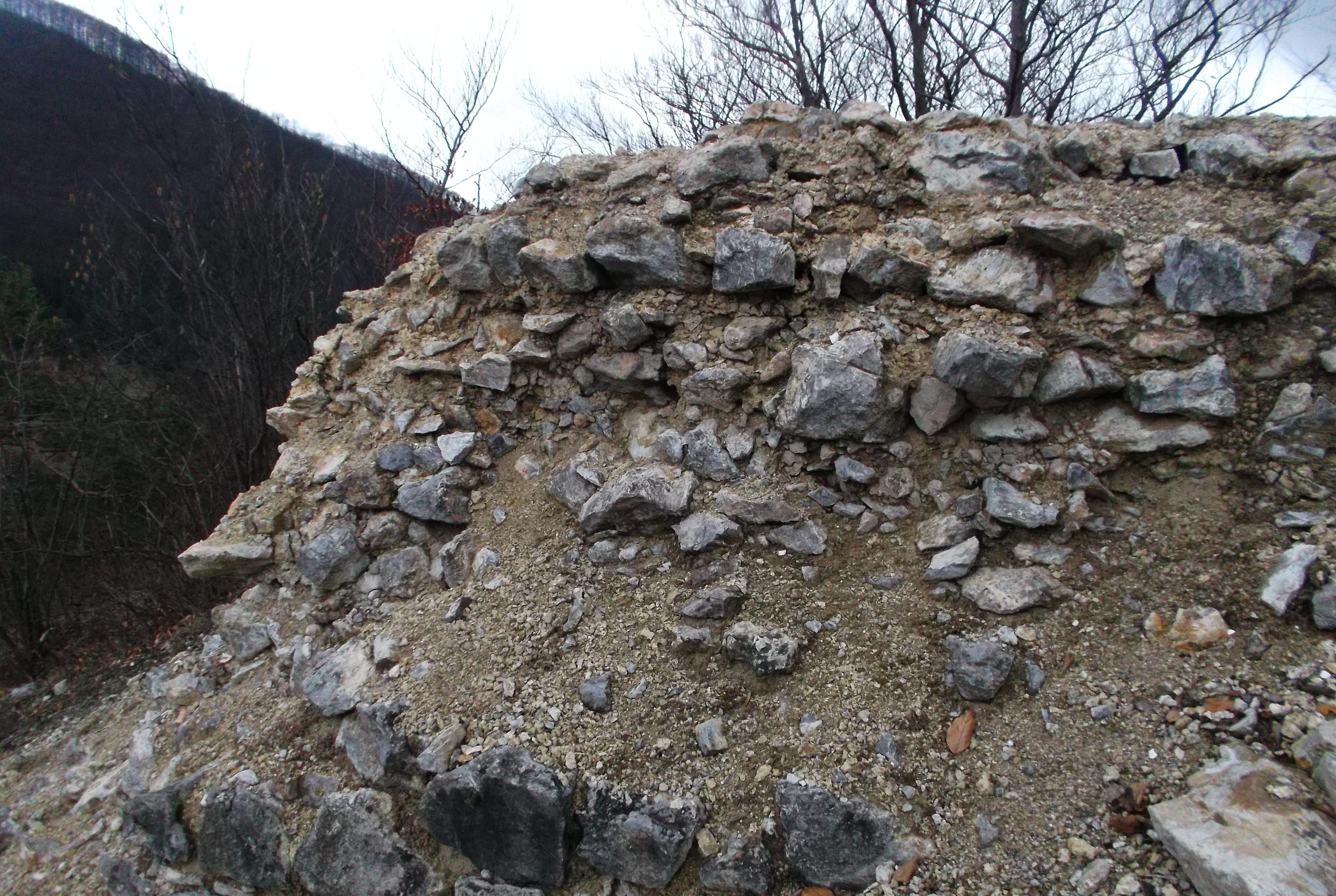
The ruins of Košeca (Kasza) Castle near Košecké Podhradie, Slovakia, built by Aynard Smaragd

Both Aynard and Gilét entered the service of Queen Maria Laskarina, the spouse of Béla IV. Aynard served as ispán of Valkó County from 1244 to 1246. The incumbent voivode Lawrence succeeded him in that position in 1248 at the latest. Aynard possessed landholdings in Valkó County between the rivers Danube and Sava, including Racsa, Atya, Küke and Görögmező, later all estates belonged to Syrmia County (present-day Sremska Rača [Serbia], Šarengrad [Croatia], Kukujevci [Serbia] and Višnjićevo [Serbia], respectively). The lordship of Atya was an important place of customs collection along the Danube, where a small fort was also erected.

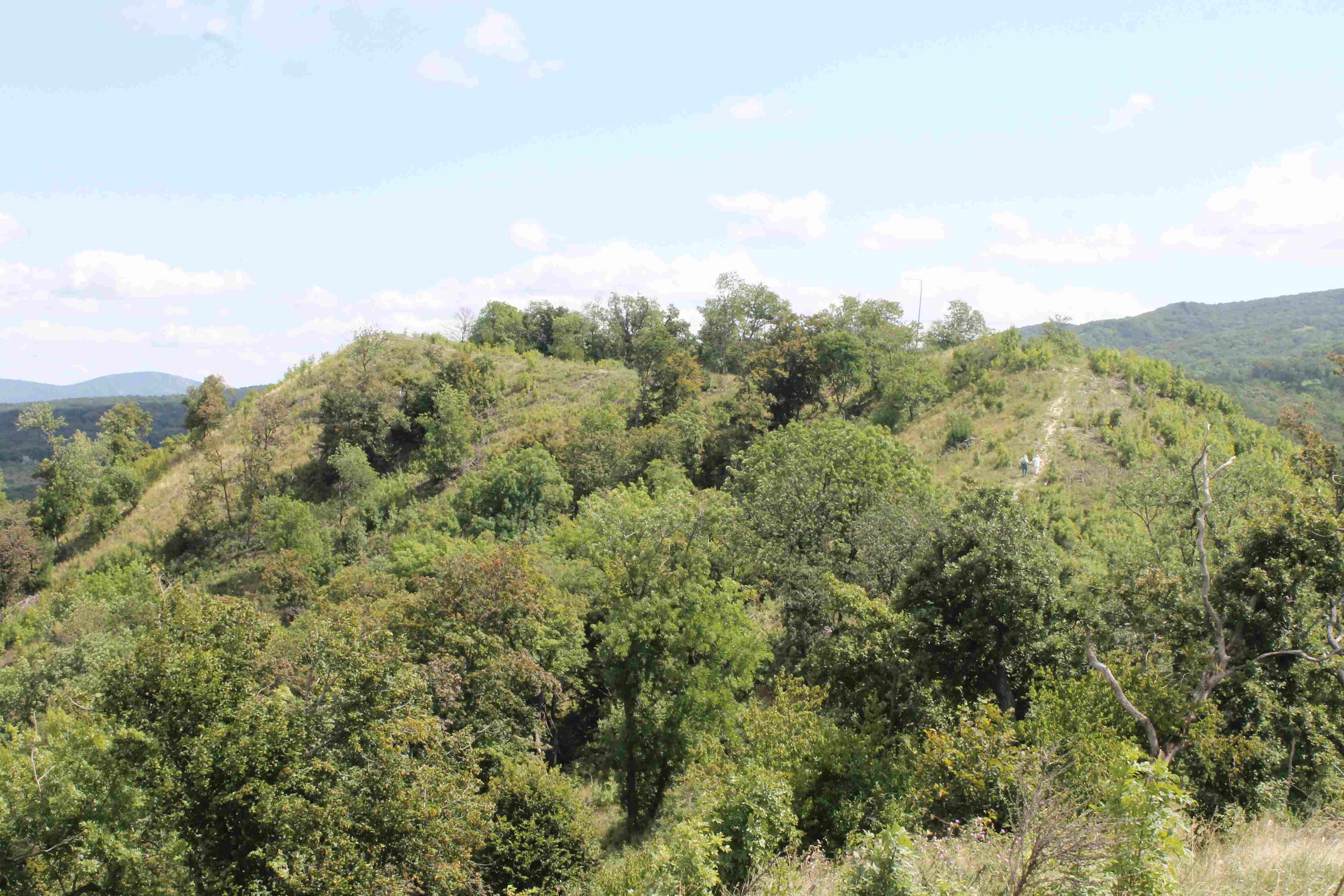
Ajnát Hill, the place of Aynard's Castle near Perbál and Tinnye

Aynard served as equerry in the queenly court of Maria Laskarina between 1257 and 1258. Beside that, he administered Szolgagyőr (Galgóc) royal castle (ispánate) within Nyitra County in the same time (present-day ruins in Hlohovec, Slovakia). In this capacity, Aynard and his brothers requested Béla IV in 1258 in order to confirm their ancestors' donations in favor of the Premonstratensian monastery of Zsámbék. Aynard also erected a castle near the forests of Perbál in Pilis County. The fort, which first appears in contemporary records in 1274, was simply called as "Aynard's Castle" (Latin: Aynardwara). The nearby hill, where the castle once stood, is called Ajnát Hill nowadays. Archaeologist Zsuzsanna Miklós considered that the construction was only started but never finished. The castle was referred to as "dilapidated and abandoned" in 1401. Aynard also built Kasza Castle in Trencsén County (near present-day Košecké Podhradie, Slovakia) sometime in the middle of the 13th century.

Although he is last mentioned as a living person in 1258, a royal charter from the year 1276 suggests that he was still alive many years later. King Ladislaus IV when exempted the people who lived in the estates of John, son of Aynard, from paying tithe and marturina, referred to Aynard's faithful and meritorious service during the reigns of Stephen V (r. 1270–1272) and himself (but it is also possible that the document refers to Stephen's period as rex iunior in the 1260s). Aynard had three sons, John, Nicholas (I) and Smaragd (IV). John functioned as ispán of Bács County in 1291. Smaragd possessed the lordship of Kasza already in 1272. The three brothers divided the lands of Aynard in Valkó County in 1275 (according to a non-authentic charter), so it is possible that the lord died not long before. The Ajnárdfi branch of the gens Smaragd descended from Nicholas (I) and Smaragd (IV). Nicholas was ancestor of the Kükei and Szár de Atya noble families, while Smaragd was progenitor of the Vér (or Veér) de Görögmező family. All families became extinct by the early 15th century.

== Sources ==
- Balázs, Gergő (2016). "A Smaragd nemzetség története [The History of the Smaragd Clan]". Turul (in Hungarian). 89 (2). Magyar Heraldikai és Genealógiai Társaság: 41–53. ISSN 1216-7258.
- Engel, Pál (1996). Magyarország világi archontológiája, 1301–1457, I [Secular Archontology of Hungary, 1301–1457, Volume I] (in Hungarian). História, MTA Történettudományi Intézete. ISBN 963-8312-44-0.
- Zsoldos, Attila (2011). Magyarország világi archontológiája, 1000–1301 [Secular Archontology of Hungary, 1000–1301] (in Hungarian). História, MTA Történettudományi Intézete. ISBN 978-963-9627-38-3.

Aynard Genus Smaragd Born: ? Died: after 1258
Political offices
Preceded by Endre Németi	Ispán of Valkó; 1244–1246	Succeeded by Lawrence
