= Nemeti (disambiguation) =

The Nemeti or Nemetes were a tribe settled along the Upper Rhine by Ariovistus in the 1st century BC.

Nemeti may also refer to:

- Némethy, Hungarian surname
- Németi (genus), Hungarian clan
- Németi, one of the two settlements that gave rise to Satu Mare
- Németi, one of the old names of Milhosť, Slovakia
