= Martinci railway station =

Railway station in Serbia

Coordinates: 45°1′15″N 19°28′1″E

Martinci railway station Железничка станица Мартинци

General information
- Location: Serbia
- Tracks: 5
Location

Martinci Railway station (Serbian: Железничка станица Мартинци) is a railway station on Belgrade–Šid railway. Located in Martinci, Sremska Mitrovica, Serbia. Railroad continued to Kukujevci-Erdevik on one end. On the other end railroad went to Laćarak following with Sremska Mitrovica. Martinci railway station consists of 5 railway track.

This railway station has been closed for may years and the station itself is more of a attraction or place to visit when in Martinci.

== See also ==
- Serbian Railways

Preceding station	Martinci railway station	Following station
Sremska Mitrovica	Belgrade–Šid railway Belgrade Centre to Šid route	Kukujevci–Erdevik
