= Sremska Mitrovica railway station =

Railway station in Serbia

Coordinates: 44°58′56″N 19°36′49″E

Sremska Mitrovica Сремска Митровица

General information
- Location: Serbia
- Tracks: 5
Location

Sremska Mitrovica railway station (Serbian: Железничка станица Сремска Митровица) is a railway station on Belgrade–Šid railway. Located in Sremska Mitrovica, Serbia. Railroad continued to Martinci in one and the other direction to Voganj. Sremska Mitrovica railway station consists of 10 railway tracks.

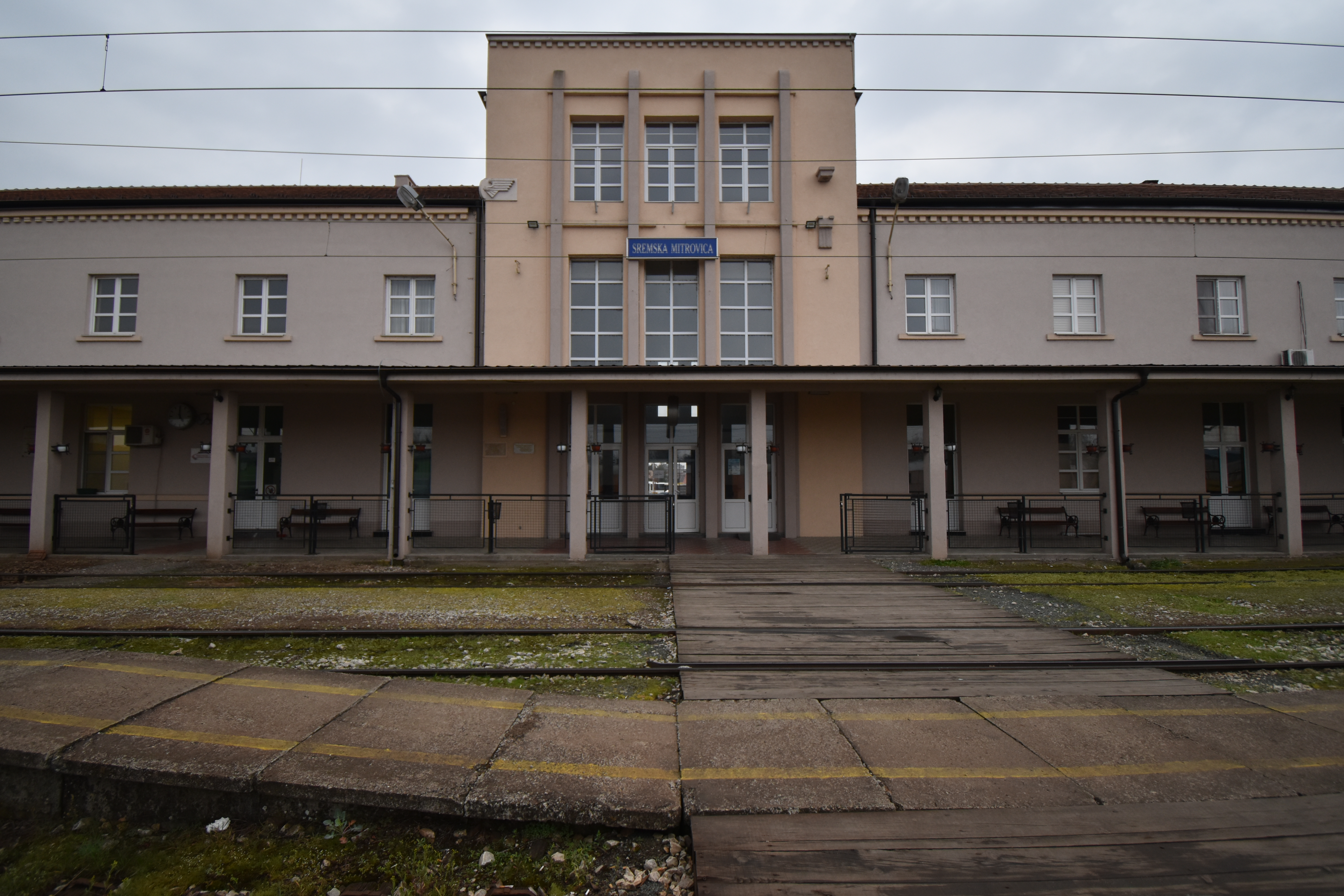
Sremska Mitrovica railway station, Serbia.

== See also ==
- Serbian Railways

Preceding station	Sremska Mitrovica railway station	Following station
Voganj	Belgrade–Šid railway Belgrade Centre to Šid route	Martinci
