= Smaragd of Transylvania =

Hungarian nobleman

Smaragd

Judge royal
- Reign: 1205–1206
- Predecessor: Julius I Kán
- Successor: Marcellus Tétény
- Died: after 1223
- Noble family: gens Smaragd
- Issue: Smaragd III; Aynard; Gilét I
- Father: Smaragd I

Smaragd (II) from the kindred Smaragd (Hungarian: Smaragd nembeli (II.) Smaragd; died after 1223) was a Hungarian distinguished nobleman from the gens Smaragd, who held several positions during the reign of Andrew II of Hungary.

== Family ==
His father was ispán (comes) Smaragd I (d. after 1167). He moved to the Kingdom of Hungary from Champagne, France. Smaragd II had a brother, Egidius (or Giles). Together with him, Smaragd built the Premontre monastery church of Zsámbék around 1220. During the foundation, Smaragd donated his estates Szentkirály (within Esztergom), Marót, Perbál, Répás (today a borough of Sajópálfala), Szörény, Zsámbék, Ság, Seregélyes and Szerdahely to the monastery. Egidius and Smaragd possibly also had another brother Paul.

Smaragd had three children, one of them was Smaragd III, archbishop of Kalocsa. Aynard I served as ispán of Valkó County from 1244 to 1246, while Gilét I was count of the tárnoks ("comes udvornicorum"). Both of them belonged to the retinue of Queen Maria Laskarina, wife of Béla IV of Hungary. They were the ancestors of the Ajnárdfi and Zsámboki (Gilétfi) noble families, respectively.

== Career ==
Smaragd served as judge royal (iudex curiae) between 1205 and 1206. Besides that he was the ispán of Szolnok County. After that he was appointed voivode of Transylvania in 1206. According to László Markó he also held that office until 1207. Smaragd owned Szeghalom and Csökmő in 1208, according to a contemporary document.

Between 1208 and 1209, he functioned as ispán of Bihar County. He served as ispán of Szolnok County for the second time in 1213. He was the ispán of Pozsony County from 1214 to 1222. He participated in Andrew II's Fifth Crusade between 1217 and 1218. Smaragd served as ispán of Bács County at the end of 1222.

== Sources ==
- Balázs, Gergő (2016). "A Smaragd nemzetség története [The History of the Smaragd Clan]". Turul (in Hungarian). 89 (2). Magyar Heraldikai és Genealógiai Társaság: 41–53. ISSN 1216-7258.
- Engel, Pál (2001). The Realm of St Stephen: A History of Medieval Hungary, 895–1526. I.B. Tauris Publishers. ISBN 1-86064-061-3.
- Markó, László (2006). A magyar állam főméltóságai Szent Istvántól napjainkig: Életrajzi Lexikon [Great Officers of State in Hungary from King Saint Stephen to Our Days: A Biographical Encyclopedia] (in Hungarian). Helikon Kiadó. ISBN 963-208-970-7.
- Zsoldos, Attila (2011). Magyarország világi archontológiája, 1000–1301 [Secular Archontology of Hungary, 1000–1301] (in Hungarian). História, MTA Történettudományi Intézete. ISBN 978-963-9627-38-3.

Political offices
Preceded by Julius Kán	Judge royal 1205–1206	Succeeded by Marcellus Tétény
Preceded by Benedict, son of Korlát	Voivode of Transylvania; 1206	Succeeded by Benedict, son of Korlát
