= Voganj railway station =

Railway station in Serbia

Coordinates: 44°59′19″N 19°43′7″E

Voganj railway station Железничка станица Вогањ

General information
- Location: Serbia
- Tracks: 5
Location

Voganj railway station (Serbian: Железничка станица Вогањ) is a railway station on Belgrade–Šid railway. Located in Voganj, Ruma, Serbia. Railroad continued to Sremska Mitrovica in one and the other direction to Ruma. Voganj railway station consists of 5 railway track.

== See also ==
- Serbian Railways

Preceding station	Voganj railway station	Following station
Ruma	Belgrade–Šid railway Belgrade Centre to Šid route	Sremska Mitrovica
