= Ruma railway station =

Railway station in Serbia

Coordinates: 44°59′22″N 19°49′38″E

Ruma railway station Железничка станица Рума
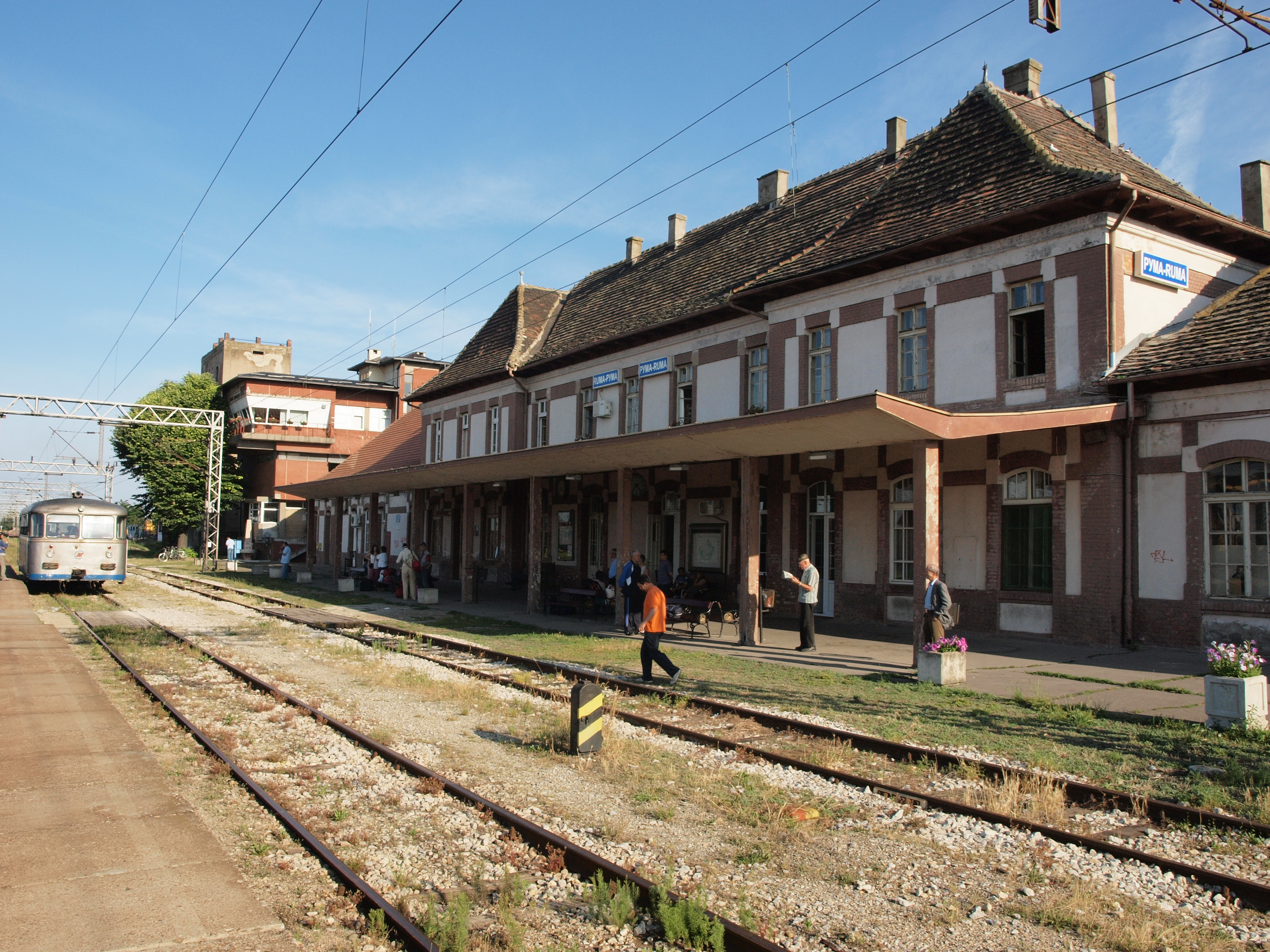

General information
- Location: Serbia
- Tracks: 15
Location

Ruma railway station (Serbian: Железничка станица Рума) is a railway station on Belgrade–Šid, first on Ruma–Zvornik railway and railway junction. Located in Ruma, Serbia. Railroad continued to Voganj in one, in the other direction to Putinci and the third direction towards to Buđanovci. Ruma railway station consists of 15 railway track.

== See also ==
- Serbian Railways
