= Smaragd =

Smaragd may refer to:

- Smaragd (genus)
- a classification of Wachau wine
