= Smaragd of Kalocsa =

Hungarian noble (died 1265)

Smaragd
- Archbishop of Kalocsa
- Archdiocese: Kalocsa
- Installed: 1257
- Term ended: 1265
- Predecessor: Thomas Hahót
- Successor: Stephen II Báncsa
- Other posts: Provost of Hánta; Provost of Pressburg; Provost of Fehérvár

Orders
- Consecration: 1259

Personal details
- Died: July 1265
- Denomination: Catholic
- Parents: Smaragd II

Smaragd (III) from the kindred Smaragd (Hungarian: Smaragd nembeli (III.) Smaragd; died July 1265) was a Hungarian prelate in the 13th century, who served as archbishop of Kalocsa from 1257 to 1265.

== Early career ==
Smaragd III was born into the gens (clan) Smaragd (or Smaragdus). According to Simon of Kéza's Gesta Hunnorum et Hungarorum, the kindred originated from the line of "Counts of Champagne" in France. This narrative was also preserved by the 14th-century Illuminated Chronicle. They founded the Premontre monastery church of Zsámbék. His father was Smaragd II, who served as Judge royal from 1205 to 1206 and Voivode of Transylvania in 1206, during the reign of Andrew II of Hungary. Smaragd had two brothers, Aynard and Gilét, both of them were officials of Queen Maria Laskarina, and progenitors of the Ajnárdfi and Gilétfi (Zsámboki) noble families, respectively, which flourished until the 15th century. Smaragd and his brothers requested Béla IV of Hungary in 1258 in order to confirm their ancestors' donations in favor of the monastery of Zsámbék.

The near-contemporary Steirische Reimchronik ("Styrian Rhyming Chronicle") described Smaragd as a "cleric of elite origin and a distinguished doctor of canon law". He was referred to as provost of the collegiate chapter of Hánta in 1244 (present-day a borough in Kisbér), which laid in the territory of the Diocese of Veszprém and functioned as one of the places of authentication in the Kingdom of Hungary. By 1253, Smaragd elevated into the dignity of provost of Pressburg (today Bratislava in Slovakia). In that year, Pope Innocent IV permitted him to apply for another ecclesiastical dignities if he renounce one of his provostships. Smaragd was sent to Rome by Béla IV in 1254 to represent the royal family and sign a marriage contract between Béla IV's youngest child Béla and an unnamed niece of Pope Innocent. However, the marriage never took place, because the pope died soon, on 7 December 1254, and negotiations had stalled.

After Thomas Hahót was made Archbishop of Kalocsa, Smaragd succeeded him and served as vice-chancellor in the royal court and provost of Fehérvár from 1254 to 1258. He was confirmed as provost by Pope Alexander IV around September 1256. Under his tenure, the standardization had been formulated that the name of the vice-chancellor (as actual administrators of cases in the chancery), and not their superior, the chancellor, appeared on the diplomas as the issuing persons. Several charters, issued by Smaragd, were incorrectly dated (within a time interval between 1236 and 1262) due to mistransliterations.

== Archbishop of Kalocsa ==
Thomas Hahót died in late 1256. Smaragd was elected as his successor in the first half of 1257. He was first mentioned as Archbishop-elect of Kalocsa on 30 May 1257. His election was confirmed by Pope Alexander IV only two years later, in 1259. By that time, Béla IV's relationship with his elder son, Duke Stephen had deteriorated. Smaragd made serious efforts to avoid a bloody civil war in Hungary. Although some clashes took place in the autumn of 1262 between the royal troops and Stephen's forces, a lasting civil war was avoided through the mediation of the two archbishops of realm, Philip Türje of Esztergom and Smaragd of Kalocsa who persuaded Béla and his son to make a compromise. According to the Peace of Pressburg, which was concluded in the autumn of 1262, the two divided the country along the Danube: the lands to the west of the river remained under the direct rule of Béla, and the government of the eastern territories was taken over by Stephen, who also adopted the title junior king. In the subsequent years, Smaragd became a partisan of Duke Stephen due to territorial considerations (the Archdiocese of Kalocsa laid in Stephen's realm). According to contemporary documents, Smaragd served as chancellor of the junior king's court between 1262 and 1264 (but presumably, he held the dignity until his death), which was an equivalent position for Philip Türje's dignity of chancellor in the royal court of Béla IV. Smaragd acted as an arbiter, commissioned by Duke Stephen, in a lawsuit around May 1264, which proves the duke's judicial authority over his territory.

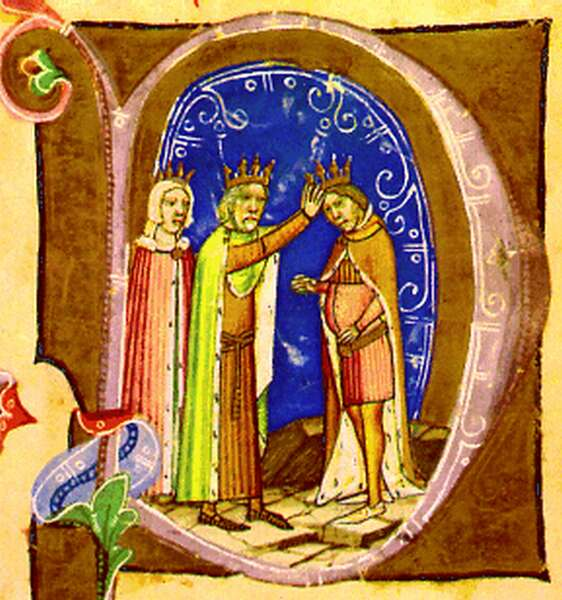
Stephen V is crowned by his father, Béla IV (from the Illuminated Chronicle)

Smaragd also exercised his metropolitan rights; when Oliver, Bishop of Syrmia intended to resign from his position and join the Franciscans due to his severe illness in 1262, he sent his two canons to the Roman Curia to request Pope Urban IV to resign from his office. The pope wrote a letter to Smaragd in December 1262, and asked him to investigate the circumstances and if he sees fit, accept the resignation of Oliver, absolve him from the obligation to govern the diocese and allow him to join the Franciscan monks. After previous failed initiatives, Ponsa, Bishop of Bosnia again asked the Holy See in 1264 to put his bishopric under the jurisdiction of the Archdiocese of Kalocsa instead of the Diocese of Ragusa (Dubrovnik). Ponsa argued, Smaragd and his predecessors were committed to fight "with great sacrifice and cost" against the Bosnian Church, which was considered heretical by the Roman Catholic Church. However, the official replacement did not happen until the beginning of the 14th century. When Pope Urban aimed to restore the Latin Empire by military recruitment, which proved to be a failed attempt, at the turn of 1263 and 1264, among others he requested also the Archdiocese of Kalocsa to contribute to the cost of the crusade, but Smaragd successfully petitioned to the Roman Curia for exemption from payment, referring to the continuous raids of Mongol marauders at the border. The archbishop also referred to that his archdiocese still had not recovered from the large-scale Mongol invasion two decades ago. Smaragd was involved in an ecclesiastical controversy in 1263. Upon Pope Urban's order, he appointed Irenaeus, a canon of Győr as archdeacon of Sopron, but the bishop, Amadeus Pok prevented his subordinate from taking possession of the benefice. As a result, Smaragd excommunicated Amadeus Pok and Irenaeus filed a lawsuit against his superior. The pope commissioned the Hungarian cardinal Stephen I Báncsa to investigate the dispute.

The 1262 truce between father and son could not prevent the outbreak of the civil war. After Stephen routed his father's army in the decisive Battle of Isaszeg in March 1265, the two archbishops – Philip and Smaragd – conducted new negotiations between Béla and his son. Smaragd died before its ratification; their agreement was signed in the Dominican Monastery of the Blessed Virgin on Rabbits' Island on 23 March 1266. The new treaty confirmed the division of the country along the Danube. Still in the summer of 1265, Béla IV entrusted Philip and Smaragd to warn the baptized Cumans – who fought on Stephen's side in the war – to keep their faith, otherwise expel them from the kingdom. Simultaneously, Pope Clement IV authorized the two archbishops to lead troops against the Mongols and other pagans in June 1265. Around the same time, the pope also entrusted Smaragd with the management of the possessions of the Diocese of Zagreb upon the request of its bishop Timothy.

However, Smaragd was murdered by some of his servants some weeks later, in July 1265, according to the narration of the Steirische Reimchronik. Church historian József Udvardy claimed it happened one year later, in July 1266, but there is sede vacante in the Archdiocese of Kalocsa in early 1266, and Smaragd was succeeded by Stephen II Báncsa (the above-mentioned cardinal's nephew) already in February 1266. The motivation behind Smaragd's murder remained obscure, but the possibility of a political assassination is can be largely ruled out.

== Sources ==
- Balázs, Gergő (2016). "A Smaragd nemzetség története [The History of the Smaragd Clan]". Turul (in Hungarian). 89 (2). Magyar Heraldikai és Genealógiai Társaság: 41–53. ISSN 1216-7258.
- Szűcs, Jenő (2002). Az utolsó Árpádok [The Last Árpáds] (in Hungarian). Osiris Kiadó. ISBN 963-389-271-6.
- Udvardy, József (1991). A kalocsai érsekek életrajza (1000–1526) [Biographies of Archbishops of Kalocsa, 1000–1526] (in Hungarian). Görres Gesellschaft.
- Zsoldos, Attila (2007). Családi ügy: IV. Béla és István ifjabb király viszálya az 1260-as években [A family affair: The Conflict between Béla IV and Junior King Stephen in the 1260s] (in Hungarian). História, MTA Történettudományi Intézete. ISBN 978-963-9627-15-4.
- Zsoldos, Attila (2011). Magyarország világi archontológiája, 1000–1301 [Secular Archontology of Hungary, 1000–1301] (in Hungarian). História, MTA Történettudományi Intézete. ISBN 978-963-9627-38-3.

Smaragd III Genus Smaragd Born: ? Died: July 1265
Political offices
Preceded by Thomas Hahót	Vice-chancellor; 1254–1258	Succeeded by Philip
Preceded by Philip	Chancellor of the Junior King; 1262–1264/5	Succeeded by Nicholas Kán
Catholic Church titles
Preceded by Thomas Hahót (elected)	Provost of Székesfehérvár; 1254–1258	Succeeded by Philip (elected)
Preceded by Thomas Hahót	Archbishop of Kalocsa; 1257–1265	Succeeded by Stephen Báncsa
