= Šid (disambiguation) =

Šid can refer to:

- Šid, town and municipality in Serbia
  - Šid railway station
- Šid, Lučenec, village in Slovakia
