= Gilét Smaragd =

Hungarian nobleman

Gilét (I) Smaragd

Count of the Tárnoks
- Reign: 1258
- Predecessor: Andrew Hont-Pázmány
- Successor: Bogislaus
- Died: after 1266
- Noble family: gens Smaragd
- Issue: Gilét II; Nicholas II; Emeric
- Father: Smaragd II

Gilét (I) from the kindred Smaragd (Hungarian: Smaragd nembeli (I.) Gilét; died after 1266) was a Hungarian nobleman in the 13th century. The influential Zsámboki family ascended from him.

== Background ==
Gilét (or Gyleth) was born into the gens (clan) Smaragd, an illustrious noble family of French origin. His father was Smaragd (II), who served as Judge royal (1205–1206) then briefly Voivode of Transylvania (1206) during the reign of Andrew II. Gilét (I) had two brothers, Smaragd (III), who was Archbishop of Kalocsa and Aynard, ancestor of the clan's Ajnárdfi (Kükei, Atyai and Veér) branch.

== Career and descendants ==
It seems Gilét possessed landholdings in Požega County, while his brother Aynard acquired lands in the neighboring Valkó County. Similarly to his brother, Gilét entered the service of Queen Maria Laskarina, the consort of King Béla IV of Hungary. He was styled as count of the tárnoks (i.e. royal treasurers, "comes udvornicorum") and – simultaneously – count of the queen's cup-bearers in early 1258. In this capacity, Gilét was entrusted to go through and review the property relations that have become tangled over decades throughout Požega County. Gilét and his brothers requested Béla IV in 1258 in order to confirm their ancestors' donations in favor of the Premonstratensian monastery of Zsámbék. Gilét was still alive in 1266, when he is referred to as landowner in Požega County.

The marriage of Gilét and his unidentified wife produced three sons: Gilét (II), Nicholas (II) and Emeric. The Zsámboki family ascended from Gilét (II). The powerful lord Nicholas Zsámboki was the grandson of Gilét (I). His another son Nicholas (II) – who was ispán of Somogy County from 1319 to 1324 – married Clara, the daughter of Demetrius Nekcsei. Their marriage produced two daughters. The third son Emeric (and his sons) are referred to as Gilétfi de Požega in the 1330s. This family became extinct in the first half of the 15th century.

== Sources ==
- Balázs, Gergő (2016). "A Smaragd nemzetség története [The History of the Smaragd Clan]". Turul (in Hungarian). 89 (2). Magyar Heraldikai és Genealógiai Társaság: 41–53. ISSN 1216-7258.
- Engel, Pál (1996). Magyarország világi archontológiája, 1301–1457, I [Secular Archontology of Hungary, 1301–1457, Volume I] (in Hungarian). História, MTA Történettudományi Intézete. ISBN 963-8312-44-0.
- Zsoldos, Attila (2011). Magyarország világi archontológiája, 1000–1301 [Secular Archontology of Hungary, 1000–1301] (in Hungarian). História, MTA Történettudományi Intézete. ISBN 978-963-9627-38-3.
