= John Smaragd =

Hungarian nobleman

Ispán of Bács
- Reign: 1291
- Predecessor: Paul Gutkeled (1272)
- Successor: Ugrin Csák (c. 1301)
- Died: after 1310
- Noble family: gens Smaragd
- Spouse: N Báncsa (?)
- Father: Aynard

John from the kindred Smaragd (Hungarian: Smaragd nembeli János; died after 1310) was a Hungarian nobleman at the turn of the 13th and 14th centuries, who served as ispán of Bács County in 1291. He led an unsuccessful Serbian invasion against Upper Syrmia in 1309–1310.

== Family ==
John was born into the gens (clan) Smaragd, an illustrious noble family of French origin. His father was Aynard, a prominent landowner in Valkó County. John had two brothers, Nicholas and Smaragd. They were ancestors of the Ajnárdfi branch of the Smaragd kindred, while John had no known descendants.

== Career ==
It is plausible that Aynard died not long before 1275. In that year, according to a non-authentic charter, John and his brothers divided the lands of Aynard in Valkó County between the rivers Danube and Sava, including the lordships of Racsa, Atya, Küke and Görögmező, later all estates belonged to Syrmia County (present-day Sremska Rača [Serbia], Šarengrad [Croatia], Kukujevci [Serbia] and Višnjićevo [Serbia], respectively). Thereafter, John possessed extensive landholdings in Valkó and Bács counties, including the fort of Atya. In 1276, King Ladislaus IV exempted the people from paying tithe and marturina who lived in the estates of John – who was at tender age at that time – in the area between the rivers Sava and Bosut (also Báza or Basuntius), i.e. John's lands were excluded from the jurisdiction of the Ban of Slavonia.

During the reign of King Andrew III, John served as ispán of Bács County in 1291. In this capacity, he took part in the royal campaign against the Duchy of Austria in the summer of 1291. He fought under the walls of Vienna, where he was injured. Upon his request, Andrew III confirmed the aforementioned privilege letter of Ladislaus IV in October 1291. It is possible that John married an unidentified noblewoman from the gens (clan) Báncsa, a notable kindred in the region Syrmia too. His relatives, Thomas Báncsa and his son Paul sold the estate of Zoch or Szat (near Manđelos in Valkó County) for 6 marks to John in 1297.

Similarly to the others lords in the region, John was forced to acknowledge the supremacy of the oligarch Ugrin Csák, who ruled de facto independently the region of Upper Syrmia – including Valkó and Bács counties – since the last decade of the 13th century. However, John swore loyalty to Stefan Dragutin, the ruler of Lower Syrmia and entered his service. Under the command of John, Dragutin's Serbian troops invaded and pillaged Ugrin's domain in Syrmia and Valkó counties in 1309 and 1310. However, the Serbian invasion was repelled by Paul Garai, a military commander of Ugrin Csák. During the counter-attack, John was captured and imprisoned. Later, Paul handed over the fettered prisoner to Ugrin Csák. John's fate is unknown. His nephew Ladislaus (son of Smaragd) requested the transcription of the aforementioned privilege letters from the cathedral chapter of Bács (Bač, Serbia) in August 1332, implying that John's lands were confiscated and he died without male descendants by then.

== Sources ==
- Balázs, Gergő (2016). "A Smaragd nemzetség története [The History of the Smaragd Clan]". Turul (in Hungarian). 89 (2). Magyar Heraldikai és Genealógiai Társaság: 41–53. ISSN 1216-7258.
- Galambosi, Péter (2017). "Csák Ugrin, a hűséges tartományúr [Ugrin Csák, the Loyal Provincial Lord]". Fons (in Hungarian). 24 (3). Szentpétery Imre Történettudományi Alapítvány: 289–322. ISSN 1217-8020.
- Zsoldos, Attila (2011). Magyarország világi archontológiája, 1000–1301 [Secular Archontology of Hungary, 1000–1301] (in Hungarian). História, MTA Történettudományi Intézete. ISBN 978-963-9627-38-3.
