= Kukujevci–Erdevik railway station =

Railway station in Serbia

Coordinates: 45°3′42″N 19°20′40″E

Kukujevci–Erdevik railway station Железничка станица Кукујевци–Ердевик

General information
- Location: Serbia
- Tracks: 5
Location

Kukujevci–Erdevik railway station (Serbian: Железничка станица Кукујевци–Ердевик) is a railway station on Belgrade–Šid railway. Located in Kukujevci, Šid, Serbia. Railroad continued to Šid in one and the other direction to Martinci. Kukujevci–Erdevik railway station consists of 5 railway track.

== See also ==
- Serbian Railways

| Preceding station | Kukujevci–Erdevik railway station | Following station |
|---|---|---|
| Martinci | Belgrade–Šid railway Belgrade Centre to Šid route | Šid |
