= Egidius Smaragd =

Count of the Queen's Court
- Reign: 1198
- Predecessor: first known
- Successor: Tiburtius Rosd (?)
- Died: after 1215
- Noble family: gens Smaragd
- Spouse: Pena
- Father: Smaragd I

Egidius from the kindred Smaragd (Hungarian: Smaragd nembeli Egyed; died after 1215) was a Hungarian distinguished nobleman at the turn of the 12th and 13th centuries. Originating from a kinship of French origin, he established a Premonstratensian monastery in Zsámbék.

== Family ==
Egidius (also Giles) was born into the gens (clan) Smaragd, a kindred from the Kingdom of France, which had settled down in Hungary in the middle of the 12th century. He was the son of Smaragd (I), who is referred to as comes in the 1160s. Egidius had a brother Smaragd (II), who served as Judge royal (1205–1206) then briefly Voivode of Transylvania (1206) during the reign of Andrew II, and possibly another sibling called Paul. Egidius married noblewoman Pena from an unidentified family. They had no known descendants.

== Career ==
Historians György Györffy and Gergely Buzás considered Egidius is identical with that namesake noble, who held court positions during the reigns of Béla III then Emeric. Accordingly, Egidius served as ispán of Vas County sometime between 1185 and 1192. In this capacity, he processed demarcation of boundaries for those estates, which members of the gens Héder donated to the Szentgotthárd Abbey, according to a royal charter from 1198. Thereafter, Egidius administered Zala County from 1192 to 1193. He was styled as count (head) of the queenly court of Constance of Aragon, the consort of King Emeric in 1198. He is the first known office-holder in this position, although a non-authentic charter refers to a certain Fulcumar with respect to the reign of Stephen III. At an unknown time, Egidius judged over a trial by ordeal in the church of Buda between certain Ruthenian (Russian) merchants and the locals of Szalonta. According to the verdict, the latter robbed the merchants during their journey. After announcing ordeal by fire, Egidius awarded the Szalonta estate to the Ruthenians, who later sold it to Boleslaus, Bishop of Vác. Egidius is last mentioned as a living person by a note of the Regestrum Varadinense in 1215.

Brothers Egidius and Smaragd established a Premonstratensian monastery dedicated to Saint John the Baptist in their ancient estate Zsámbék around 1220. They donated the surrounding fields, mills and lands and the servants belonging to them to the newly erected monastery. Egidius granted his estates along the rivers Körös and Pét to the monastery, including his portions in the villages Csökmő and Szeghalom. Beside these, Egidius handed over the dowry – Pátka in Veszprém County – of his late wife Pena to the Premonstratensians. Lady Pena was buried in the middle of the nave of the church. The three sons of Smaragd requested Béla IV in 1258 in order to confirm their ancestors' donations in favor of the monastery of Zsámbék.

== Sources ==
- Balázs, Gergő (2016). "A Smaragd nemzetség története [The History of the Smaragd Clan]". Turul (in Hungarian). 89 (2). Magyar Heraldikai és Genealógiai Társaság: 41–53. ISSN 1216-7258.
- Györffy, György (1956). "Adatok a Pilis megyei monostorok középkori történetéhez [Data for the Medieval History of Monasteries in Pilis County]". Művészettörténeti Értesítő. 5 (4): 280–285. ISSN 0027-5247.
- Zsoldos, Attila (2011). Magyarország világi archontológiája, 1000–1301 [Secular Archontology of Hungary, 1000–1301] (in Hungarian). História, MTA Történettudományi Intézete. ISBN 978-963-9627-38-3.

Egidius Genus Smaragd Born: ? Died: after 1215
Political offices
Preceded by first known	Count of the Queen's Court; 1198	Succeeded by Tiburtius Rosd (?)
