= Thomas Hahót =

Hungarian prelate (died 1256)

- Archbishop of Kalocsa
- Installed: 1254
- Term ended: 1256
- Predecessor: Benedict
- Successor: Smaragd
- Other post: Vice-chancellor
- Previous post: Provost-elect of Fehérvár

Personal details
- Died: 1256
- Denomination: Catholic
- Residence: Kalocsa Cathedral
- Parents: Buzád III Hahót; Eve Atyusz

Thomas from the kindred Hahót (Hungarian: Hahót nembeli Tamás; fl. 1227 – died 1256) was a Hungarian prelate, who served as the Archbishop of Kalocsa from 1254 to 1256.

== Biography ==
Thomas was born into the Buzád branch of the gens Hahót as the son of Buzád III Hahót and Eve Atyusz. His grandfathers were Buzád II Hahót, a notable baron and later Dominican martyr of the Christian Church, and Sal Atyusz, who held the position of ispán of Karakó ispánate in 1205. Thomas had three siblings: Sal, a clergyman, Atyusz, who governed several counties since the 1270s and was head of the household of Queen Mother Tomasina Morosini for a time, and an unidentified sister, who married local nobleman Ant Lőrinte from Zala County.

Thomas was first mentioned in 1227 by a contemporary document, when he inherited the estate of Bersen from his maternal grandfather, Sal Atyusz. He entered ecclesiastical service. In 1243, he was mentioned as provost of Buda. In this capacity, he filed a lawsuit against the burghers of Buda who declined to recognize his judicial authority. King Béla IV of Hungary ruled in favor of Thomas. From 1252 to 1254, he served as vice-chancellor in the royal court, in addition to his church office of provost-elect of Fehérvár.

Benedict, the Archbishop of Kalocsa elevated to the position of Archbishop of Esztergom in April 1254, was confirmed by Pope Innocent IV. The archiepiscopal see in Kalocsa remained vacant for the upcoming months. In the second half of 1254, Thomas Hahót was elected as Archbishop of Kalocsa, proving by a letter from Innocent's successor, Pope Alexander IV, dated 12 February 1255. According to this, the Pope urged the canons of archdiocese, Lawrence of Kalocsa and Nicholas of Bács, to finance retrospectively the electoral process of Archbishop Thomas with borrowing 150 denari. His brother Sal functioned as lector at the Bács Cathedral (today in Bač, Serbia), the second seat of the archbishopric during his term. However, Thomas soon died in late 1256. Smaragd succeeded him in the next year.

== Sources ==
- Katona, István (2001). A kalocsai érseki egyház története I. [History of the Archiepiscopal Church of Kalocsa, Vol. 1] (in Hungarian). Translated by Thoroczkay, Gábor. Kalocsai Múzeumbarátok Köre. ISBN 963-00-7436-2.
- Udvardy, József (1991). A kalocsai érsekek életrajza (1000–1526) [Biographies of Archbishops of Kalocsa, 1000–1526] (in Hungarian). Görres Gesellschaft.
- Zsoldos, Attila (2011). Magyarország világi archontológiája, 1000–1301 [Secular Archontology of Hungary, 1000–1301] (in Hungarian). História, MTA Történettudományi Intézete. ISBN 978-963-9627-38-3.

Thomas Genus Hahót Born: ? Died: 1256
Political offices
Preceded by Job Záh	Vice-chancellor; 1252–1254	Succeeded by Smaragd
Catholic Church titles
Preceded by Job Záh	Provost of Székesfehérvár (elected); 1252–1254	Succeeded by Smaragd
Preceded by Benedict	Archbishop of Kalocsa; 1254–1256	Succeeded by Smaragd
