= Némethy =

Némethy, Németi, or Némethi is an old Hungarian surname, which may refer to a place of origin, one of many named Németi. Notable people with the surname include:

- Albert Nemethy
- Bertalan de Némethy (1911–2002), Hungarian cavalry officer and show jumping coach
- Ella Némethy
- Endre Németi
- Gyula Németi
- Ivan Némethy
- Katalin Némethy (1933–2013), Hungarian teacher and mathematician
