= Martinci =

Martinci Мартинци (Serbian)
- Village (Selo)
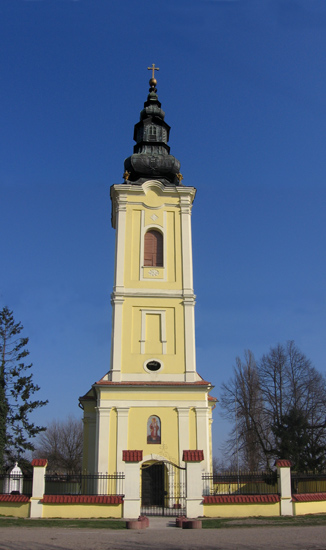
- Serbian Orthodox church

- Location within Vojvodina Location within Serbia Location within Europe
- Coordinates: 45°01′N 19°28′E
- Country: Serbia
- Province: Vojvodina
- Region: Syrmia
- District: Srem
- Municipality: Sremska Mitrovica

Population (2002)
  - Total: 3,639
- Time zone: UTC+1 (CET)
  - Summer (DST): UTC+2 (CEST)

Martinci (Serbian Cyrillic: Мартинци) is a village in Serbia. It is situated in the Sremska Mitrovica municipality, Srem District, Vojvodina province. The village has a Serb ethnic majority and its population numbering 3,639 people (2002 census).

== Name ==
In Serbian, the village is known as Martinci (Мартинци), and in Hungarian as Szávaszentmárton. It was named after Saint Martin. The name of the village in Serbian is plural.

== History ==
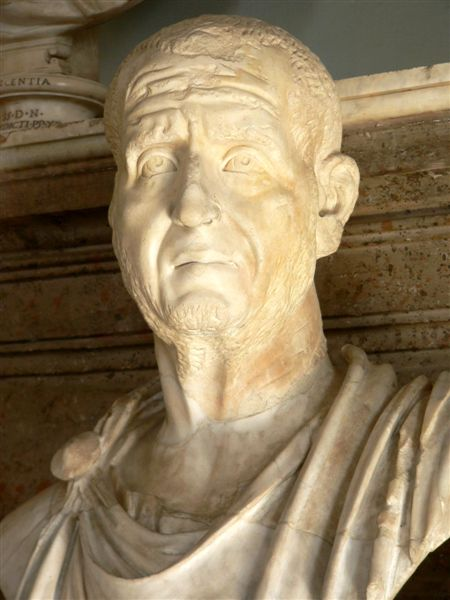
Traianus Decius, Roman Emperor (249-251), born in Budalia (modern Martinci)

It is one of the oldest places in Vojvodina. During Roman rule, the village was known as Budalia and was a place of birth of Roman emperor Traianus Decius (249–251).

Following Ottoman retreat from the region, the Lordship of Ilok and Upper Syrmia was established, and the village became part of its domain.

== Gallery ==
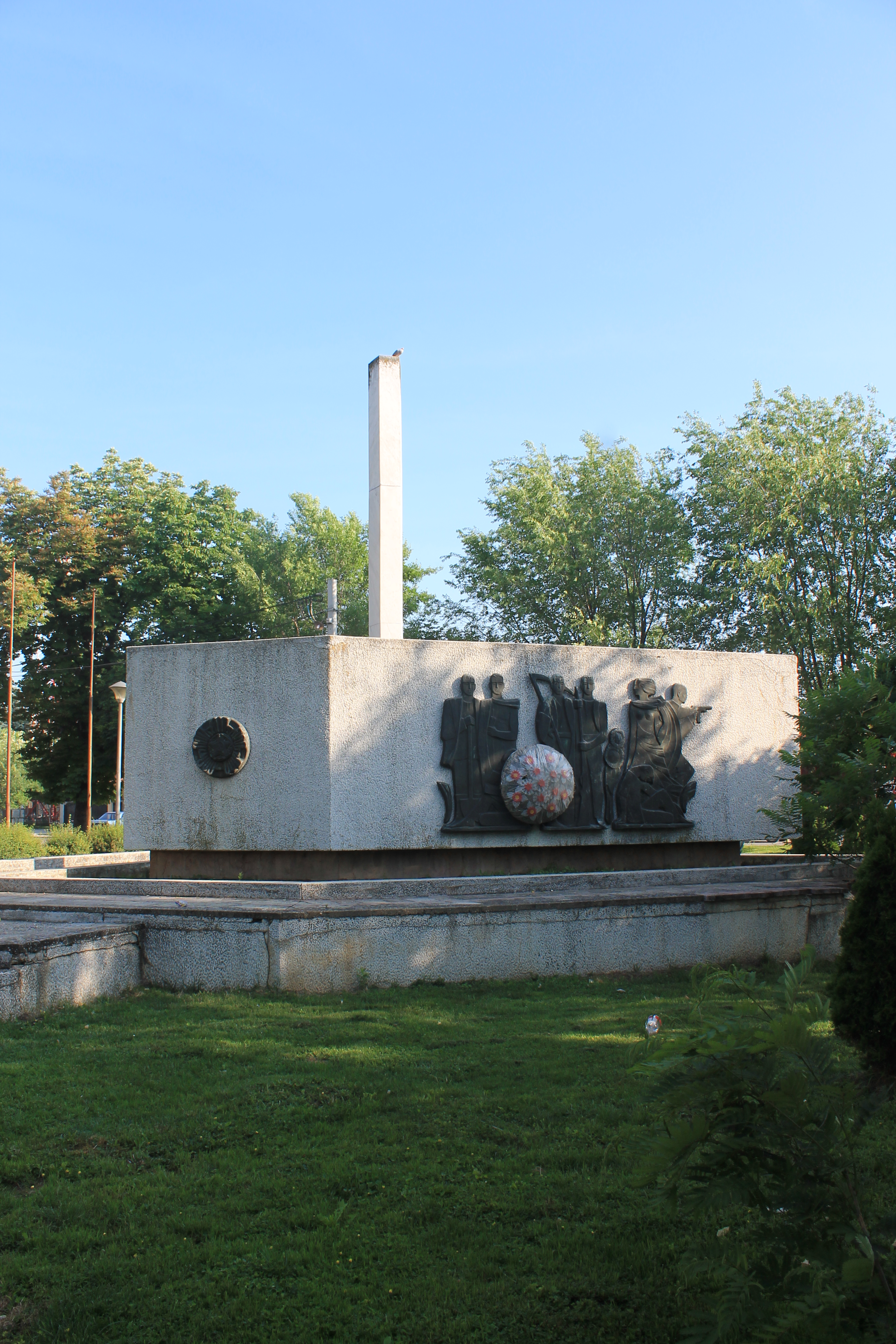

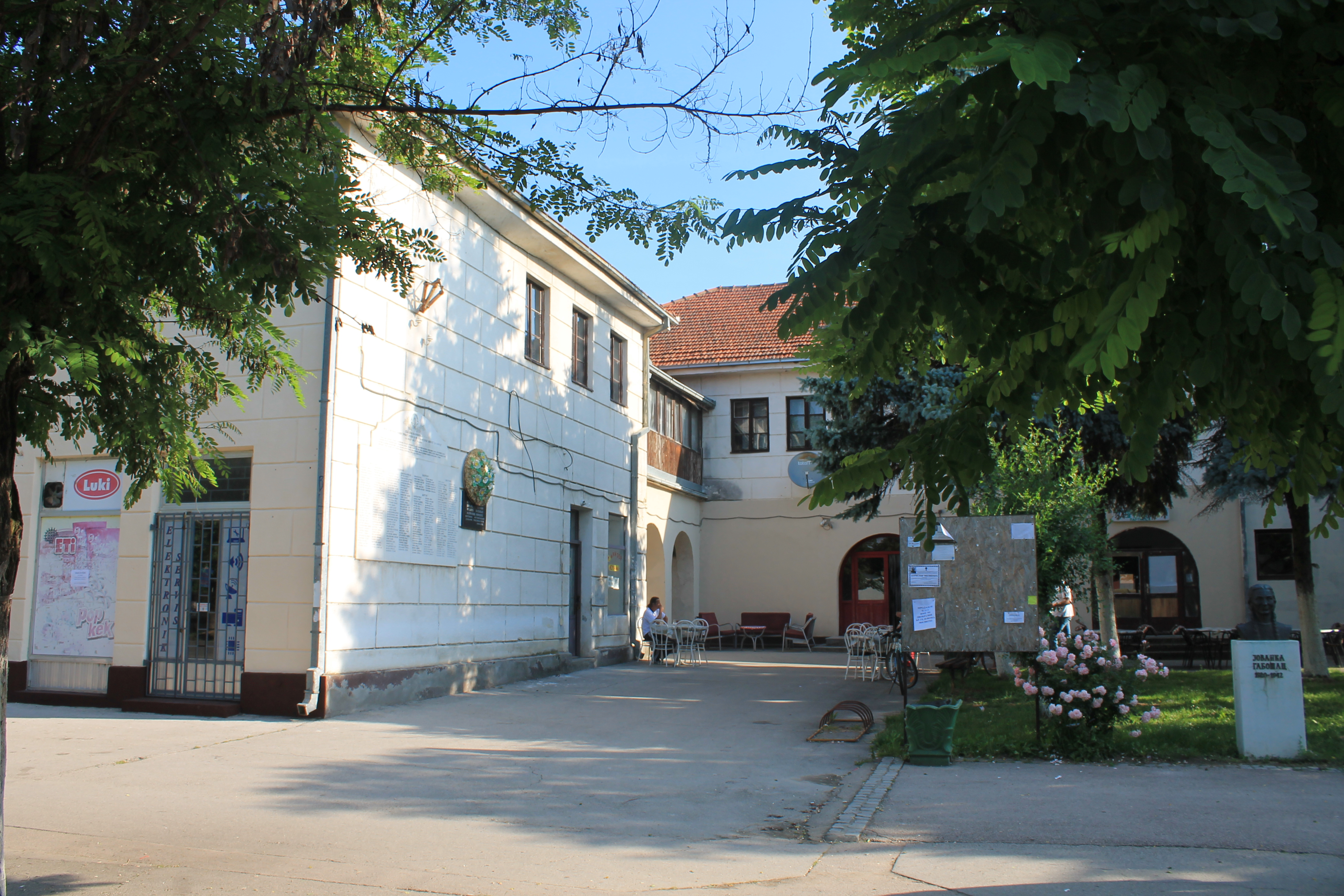

== Historical population ==
- 1961: 4,396
- 1971: 4,003
- 1981: 3,975
- 1991: 3,663
- 2000: 2,500
- 2015: 1,900

== See also ==
- List of places in Serbia
- List of cities, towns and villages in Vojvodina
- Martinci railway station
