= Voganj =

Voganj Вогањ (Serbian)
- Village (Selo)
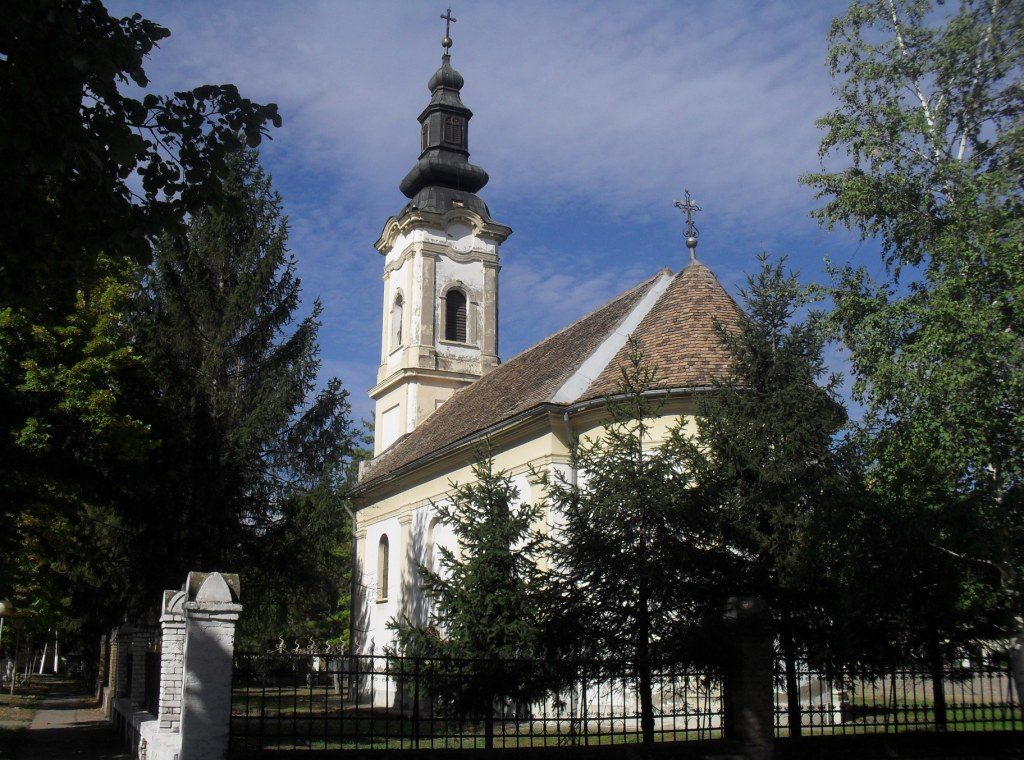
- Orthodox church in Voganj

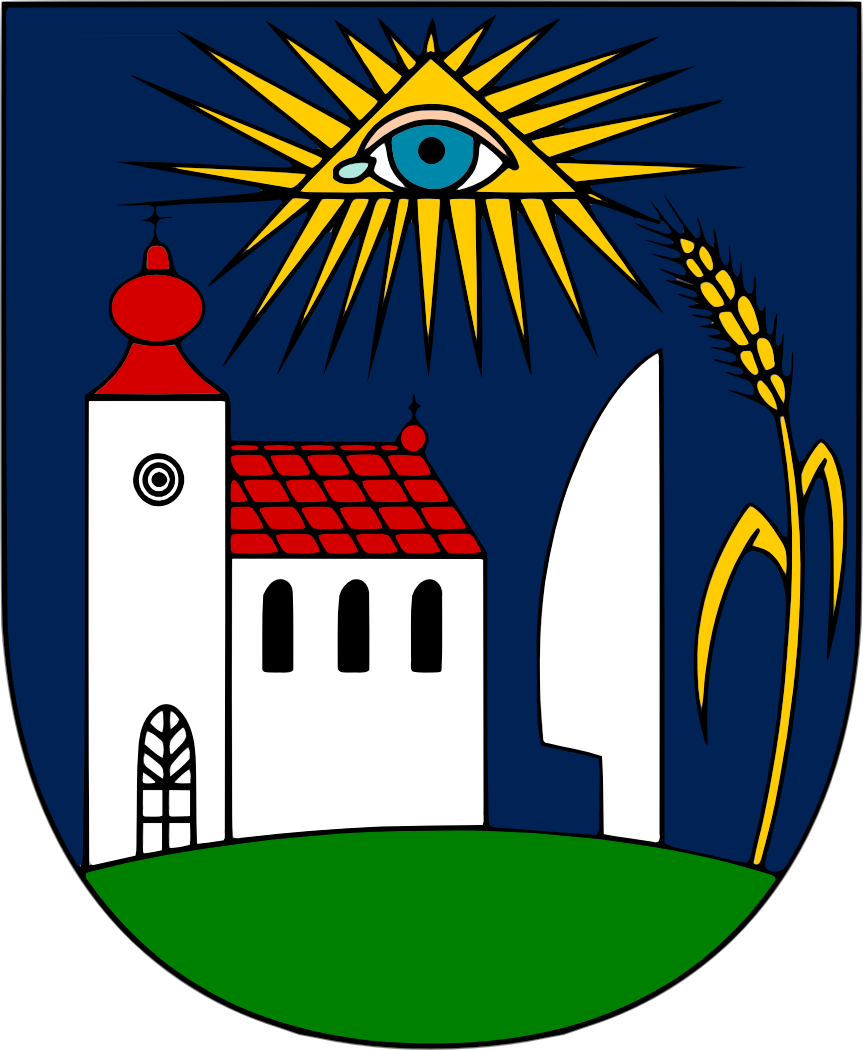
- Seal

- Location within Vojvodina Location within Serbia Location within Europe
- Coordinates: 45°00′N 19°45′E
- Country: Serbia
- Province: Vojvodina
- Region: Syrmia
- District: Srem
- Municipality: Ruma
- First mention: 1339

Area
  - Total: 14.2 sq mi (36.9 km^{2})
- Elevation: 318 ft (97 m)

Population (2011)
  - Total: 1,506
  - Density: 106/sq mi (40.8/km^{2})
- Time zone: UTC+1 (CET)
  - Summer (DST): UTC+2 (CEST)

Voganj (Serbian Cyrillic: Вогањ) is a village in Serbia. It is situated in the Ruma municipality, in the Srem District, Vojvodina province. The village has the population of 1,281 (2022 census).

== Location ==
The village is located 4 km (2.5 mi) west of its municipal seat, town of Ruma. It is stretched along both sides of the Ruma-Sremska Mitrovica road, which southwest of the village crosses both the railway and highway Belgrade-Zagreb.

It functions as an adjoining suburb of Ruma as it almost makes one continuously built-up area with it.

== Geography ==
Voganj is a rural settlement of the semi-compact type. It is located on the loess plateau at an altitude of 97 m (318 ft). It covers an area of 36.9 km^{2} (14.2 sq mi) and statistically consists of two cadastre municipalities: Voganj (20.06 km^{2} (7.75 sq mi)) and Marđelos (16.84 km^{2} (6.50 sq mi)).

It is a typical road settlement, stretched along the road. It consists of two parts: much larger Voganj (simply referred to as Selo, village) and smaller and separated Erem.

East of the village flows the river Kudoš, separating Voganj and Ruma, while on the west a creek Mančelov Gat passes next to the settlement. Both streams stretch in the north-south direction and flow into the Sava river.

=== Erem ===
Erem is a hamlet of Voganj, 4 km (2.5 mi) to the west. It is connected to the rest of the village via the street which splits off the Ruma-Sremska Mitrovica road near the Voganj railway station. Erem developed after World War II and was settled by the colonists from the regions of Herzegovina (today in Bosnia and Herzegovina) and Lika and Kordun (today in Croatia).

In 2018, Erem consisted of 33 houses centered around one, 300 m (980 ft) long street with some 100 inhabitants. The area was a wasteland. In the mid-18th century, the counts from the Pejačević family held large herds of pigs and cattle in the area of modern Erem and also built the quarters for their servants with families. Next to the stables they built the railway station, one of the oldest in Syrmia. Modern Voganj railway station is located on the same place.

There is no definite answer on the origin of the hamlet's name. Theories include the Hungarian name for joy (öröm), Greek word erēmitēs (hermit, a man living in the wasteland), and French ermitage, a secluded place.

The settlement is entirely agricultural. In 2010s the waterworks was introduced.

== History ==
Voganj is mentioned for the first time in 1339. It has been continuously populated since the early 18th century. A church dedicated to the Translation of the Relics of Saint Nicholas from Myra to Bari was built in 1756.

In 1807, the village was the center of the rebellion of the Syrmian peasants, which was known as the Tican's Rebellion.

Voganj was electrified in 1913 and the second church, dedicated to Saint Petka, was built in 1938. Telephone lines were conducted in 1978 and the waterworks in 1983. The village has a lower-grades elementary school "Veljko Dugošević", healthcare center, post office and a railway station, which is located outside of the village, to the southwest.

== Population ==
Historical population
Year	Pop.	±%
1921	1,012	—
1931	1,547	+52.9%
1948	1,424	−8.0%
1953	1,558	+9.4%
1961	1,687	+8.3%
1971	1,692	+0.3%
1981	1,728	+2.1%
1991	1,628	−5.8%
2002	1,614	−0.9%
2011	1,506	−6.7%
2022	1,281	−14.9%

According to the latest census, Voganj had 1,281 inhabitants in 2022, and has been steadily depopulating since the 1980s.

The village has a Serb ethnic majority. Serbian population is mixed, being of both origins: old, local population and colonists from the planned colonization in the years after World War II. The two most spread slavas (festivity of family saint protectors) are Saint John and Saint Nicholas.

== Economy ==
The main branches of economy are crop farming and husbandry. Principal products include wheat, corn and pigs.

== Sources ==
- Slobodan Ćurčić, Broj stanovnika Vojvodine, Novi Sad, 1996.

== See also ==
- List of places in Serbia
- List of cities, towns and villages in Vojvodina
- Voganj railway station
