= Košecké Podhradie =

- Municipality
- Flag

- Location of Košecké Podhradie in the Trenčín Region Location of Košecké Podhradie in Slovakia
- Coordinates: 48.97°N 18.31°E
- Country: Slovakia
- Region: Trenčín Region
- District: Ilava District
- First mentioned: 1312

Area
  - Total: 36.90 km^{2} (14.25 sq mi)
- Elevation: 379 m (1,243 ft)

Population (2025)
  - Total: 1,063
- Time zone: UTC+1 (CET)
  - Summer (DST): UTC+2 (CEST)
- Postal code: 183 1
- Area code: +421 42
- Vehicle registration plate (until 2022): IL
- Website: www.koseckepodhradie.sk

Košecké Podhradie (Hungarian: Kasaváralja) is a village and municipality in Ilava District in the Trenčín Region of north-western Slovakia.

== History ==
In historical records the village was first mentioned in 1312.

== Geography ==
The municipality lies at an altitude of 379 metres (1,243 ft) and covers an area of 36.90 km^{2} (14.25 sq mi) (2025).

== Population ==
Population statistic (10 years)
| Year | 1995 | 2005 | 2015 | 2025 |
|---|---|---|---|---|
| Count | 1079 | 1064 | 1040 | 1063 |
| Difference | | −1.39% | −2.25% | +2.21% |

Population statistic
| Year | 2024 | 2025 |
|---|---|---|
| Count | 1053 | 1063 |
| Difference | | +0.94% |

It has a population of 1063 people (31 December 2025).

=== Ethnicity ===
Census 2021 (1+ %)
| Ethnicity | Number | Fraction |
|---|---|---|
| Slovak | 1009 | 96.37% |
| Not found out | 45 | 4.29% |
| Total | 1047 | |

In year 2021 was 1047 people by ethnicity 1009 as Slovak, 45 as Not found out, 8 as Czech, 1 as Russian, 1 as Austrian, 1 as Polish, 1 as Moravian, 1 as Hungarian and 1 as Other.

Note on population: The difference values of population numbers in the table "Population statistic" and in the sections "Ethnicity" & "Religion" is caused by the use of various statistical methods.

=== Religion ===
Census 2021 (1+ %)
| Religion | Number | Fraction |
|---|---|---|
| Roman Catholic Church | 827 | 78.99% |
| None | 166 | 15.85% |
| Not found out | 35 | 3.34% |
| Total | 1047 | |

In year 2021 was 1047 people by religion 827 from Roman Catholic Church, 166 from None, 35 from Not found out, 9 from Evangelical Church, 3 from Christian Congregations in Slovakia, 2 from Ad hoc movements, 1 from Paganism and natural spirituality, 1 from Jehovah's Witnesses, 1 from Other, 1 from Greek Catholic Church and 1 from Buddhism.
