= Smaragd (genus) =

Genus (gens) Smaragd
- Parent house: Limoges
- Country: Kingdom of Hungary
- Founded: 1180s
- Founder: Ainordi de Champagne
- Titles: viscount of Limoges
- Cadet branches: House of Zsámboki

Smaragd (Smaragdus) or Zsámbéki was the name of a gens (Latin for "clan"; nemzetség in Hungarian) in the Kingdom of Hungary. The ancestor of the clan was a French knight calling himself at that time "Ainordi (Aynard) de Champagne", who settled down in Hungary around 1186 during the reign of Béla III of Hungary and received use of the estate of Zsámbék under a royal grant. His descendants, the gens Smaragd built the Zsámbék Premontre monastery church.

The origins of Aynard are somewhat obscure. No-one with that name appears in genealogical data of the Counts of Champagne, and thus it is assumed he was resident as a knight within the entourage of the Count, and so styling himself "de Champagne", which was the practice at that time. The only known knight with such a name in service to the French crown and/or the Count of Champagne at that time was Adehemar (aka Aymar or Aynard). That knight had been the Viscount of Limoges until 1183, when he was outlawed by King Henry II of England for insurrection against the English monarch. Exiled, he then left Anglo-Norman military service and joined the French court around 1184. The future Queen Consort of Hungary, Margaret of France, was also resident there and had been resident at Limoges castle during her early childhood. She knew the knight Aynard well, so he would be a natural choice to escort her to Esztergom to join her new husband Bela III.

== Notable members ==
- Smaragd I, son of Ainordi de Champagne, comes
- Egidius
- Smaragd II, judge royal (1205–1206), voivode of Transylvania (1206)
- Smaragd III, archbishop of Kalocsa (1257–1265), vice-chancellor (1254–1258)
- Aynard (fl. 1244–1258)
- Gilét (fl. 1258–1266)
- John (fl. 1275–1310)

== Sources ==
- Balázs, Gergő (2016). "A Smaragd nemzetség története [The History of the Smaragd Clan]". Turul (in Hungarian). 89 (2). Magyar Heraldikai és Genealógiai Társaság: 41–53. ISSN 1216-7258.
- Zsoldos, Attila (2011). Magyarország világi archontológiája, 1000–1301 [Secular Archontology of Hungary, 1000–1301] (in Hungarian). História, MTA Történettudományi Intézete. ISBN 978-963-9627-38-3.
- János Karácsonyi: A magyar nemzetségek a XIV. század közepéig. Budapest: Magyar Tudományos Akadémia. 1900–1901.
- Gyula Kristó (editor): Korai Magyar Történeti Lexikon - 9-14. század (Encyclopedia of the Early Hungarian History - 9-14th centuries); Akadémiai Kiadó, 1994, Budapest; ISBN 963-05-6722-9.
- Elizabeth Hallam The Plantagenet Chronicles
