= Endre Németi =

Hungarian nobleman (??–c.1240)

Ispán of Valkó
- Reign: 1240
- Predecessor: George
- Successor: Aynard Smaragd
- Died: after 1240
- Noble family: gens Németi
- Spouse: daughter of Bökény

Endre from the kindred Németi (Hungarian: Németi nembeli Endre; fl. 1240) was a Hungarian nobleman in the 13th century, who served as ispán of Valkó County in 1240.

== Career ==
Endre (or Hendre) was born into gens (clan) Németi, which possessed lands in southern Transdanubia. His parentage is unknown. He is the earliest known member of the clan. He was appointed ispán of Valkó County sometime after 1234. He is mentioned in this office only in 1240. In that year, Martin, the son of the late Batiz Negol sued Endre's father-in-law Bökény (Büken) regarding the estates Heyreh and Luder, claiming that Bökény lost these estates of his family, in spite of the guarantee given earlier. As the conclusion of the lawsuit, Endre compensated Martin with 100 marks on behalf of his father-in-law.

Endre was succeeded as ispán by Aynard Smaragd in 1244 at the latest.

== Sources ==
- Karácsonyi, János (1900). A magyar nemzetségek a XIV. század közepéig. [The Hungarian genera until the middle of the 14th century] (in Hungarian). Hungarian Academy of Sciences.
- Zsoldos, Attila (2011). Magyarország világi archontológiája, 1000–1301 [Secular Archontology of Hungary, 1000–1301] (in Hungarian). História, MTA Történettudományi Intézete. ISBN 978-963-9627-38-3.

Endre Genus Németi Born: ? Died: after 1240
Political offices
Preceded by George	Ispán of Valkó; 1240	Succeeded by Aynard Smaragd
