= Németi (genus) =

Hungarian clan name

Genus (gens) Németi
- Country: Kingdom of Hungary
- Dissolution: 14th century
- Cadet branches: House of Istvánffy

Németi (Nemty or Nempty) was a minor gens (Latin for "clan"; nemzetség in Hungarian) in the Kingdom of Hungary, which possessed lands in the southern parts of Transdanubia, mainly Baranya and Valkó counties. The Istvánffy family descended from this clan.

== History ==
The ancient seat of the kindred was Németi (present-day a borough of Szalánta) which laid south to Pécs in Baranya County. It is possible that Nemetin near Osijek, Croatia perpetuated also the name of the clan.

The first known member of the kindred was Endre (Hendre), who served as ispán of Valkó County in 1240. He married an unidentified daughter of a certain Bökény. In that year, Endre represented his father-in-law in a lawsuit for the estates Heyreh and Luder in Valkó County.

=== Vajszló branch ===
During the first Mongol invasion of Hungary, brothers James (I) and Ambrose fought against the Mongols. Both of them escorted the fleeing Béla IV of Hungary to the Dalmatian coast following the disastrous Battle of Mohi in April 1241. James (also known as Abosk) was killed in one of clashes in 1242, which occurred amidst the withdrawal of Mongols from Hungary. Béla IV donated a portion in Vajszló in Baranya County to Ambrose for their loyalty and military service in 1244, separating the land from the accessories of the fort of Kovászd (Quazd).

Nicholas (I), the son of Ambrose requested the confirmation of this donation letter from Duke Stephen, co-ruler of the kingdom, in 1268. Nicholas and his brother James (II) participated in the Bohemian–Hungarian War in 1273. As a result, Ladislaus IV of Hungary also confirmed their right of ownership over Vajszló in that year. Upon the request of James (II), Andrew III of Hungary also confirmed the donation in 1295. The Németi clan was involved in a lengthy lawsuit over Vajszló against the Dominican nunnery of Rabbits' Island, lasted from 1295 to 1384.

James (II) sued his relatives, Hector and Csák (see below), for partly the dower of his late mother. In 1296, the parties settled their relationship, Hector and Csák handed over their estates in Zselizkeresztúr (north of Szigetvár), Szentgál, Vajszló and Raven to James, who was also mentioned as a neighboring landowner near Geresd in 1312. By that time, James became a familiaris of John Kőszegi, who dominated southern Transdanubia de facto independently of the king. In this capacity, he functioned as vice-ispán of Baranya County in the 1310s. His three sons were Ladislaus, John and Nicholas (II). The former acted as oath taker for Peter Siklósi (from the gens Kán) during a lawsuit in 1330. John acted as an arbiter in the litigation process between the Siklósi and Dersfi families in 1355. James (III), the son of Nicholas (II) took the litigation for Vajszló against the Dominican nuns from 1360 to 1384.

John, son of Stephen from the Németi kindred served as vice-ispán of Baranya County in 1404 and vice-ispán of Valkó County in 1405, as a familiaris of John Maróti.

Family tree

- N
  - James I (or Abosk; fl. 1241–1242†)
  - Ambrose (fl. 1241–1244)
    - Nicholas I (fl. 1268–1273)
    - James II (fl. 1273–1312)
      - Ladislaus (fl. 1330)
      - John (fl. 1322–1355)
      - (?) Nicholas II
        - James III (fl. 1360–1384)

=== Fülöp branch ===
Hilary, the first known member of this branch is known only by name. His son Arnót or Arnold (I) was granted the portion in Fülöp (or Fülöpfölde) near Sárok by King Ladislaus IV in 1280. The estate previously belonged to the property of Arnold's brother-in-law Benedict, who died without descendants. In exchange for the estate, Arnold (I) had to pay the dower to his unidentified sister. Along with several other nobles in the region, he acted as an arbiter in a lawsuit regarding Šag (Ság) in 1296. He mediated the aforementioned reconciliation between his relatives James (II) and the sons of Herbord in the same year. His son Benedict and his grandson Paul sold the estate Fülöp to a Cuman chieftain Kurgona in 1320.

Family tree

- Hilary
  - Arnold I (fl. 1280–1296)
    - Arnold II
      - Paul (fl. 1320)
    - Benedict (fl. 1320)
  - a daughter (fl. 1280) ∞ Benedict N (d. before 1280)

=== Kisasszonyfalva branch ===
According to historian Pál Engel, the Kisasszonyfalvi (or Boldogasszonyfalvi) family, from which the prestigious Istvánffy (Istvánfi) family originates, came from the Németi clan. They took their name after present-day Kisasszonyfa in Baranya County.

Family tree

- Nicholas
  - Herbord
    - Hector (fl. 1296–1330)
      - Kisasszonyfalvi family
        - (from 1450s) Istvánffy (Istvánfi) family
    - Csák (fl. 1296–1314)

== Sources ==
- Engel, Pál (1996). Magyarország világi archontológiája, 1301–1457, I. [Secular Archontology of Hungary, 1301–1457, Volume I] (in Hungarian). História, MTA Történettudományi Intézete. ISBN 963-8312-44-0.
- Karácsonyi, János (1900). A magyar nemzetségek a XIV. század közepéig. [The Hungarian genera until the middle of the 14th century] (in Hungarian). Hungarian Academy of Sciences.
- Szentpétery, Imre (1930). Az Árpád-házi királyok okleveleinek kritikai jegyzéke I. kötet 3. füzet, 1001–1270 [A Critical Register of Royal Charters from the House of Árpád, Vol. 1. No. 3.] (in Hungarian). Magyar Országos Levéltár.
- Zsoldos, Attila (2011). Magyarország világi archontológiája, 1000–1301 [Secular Archontology of Hungary, 1000–1301] (in Hungarian). História, MTA Történettudományi Intézete. ISBN 978-963-9627-38-3.
