= Kukujevci =

Kukujevci Кукујевци (Serbian)
- Village (Selo)
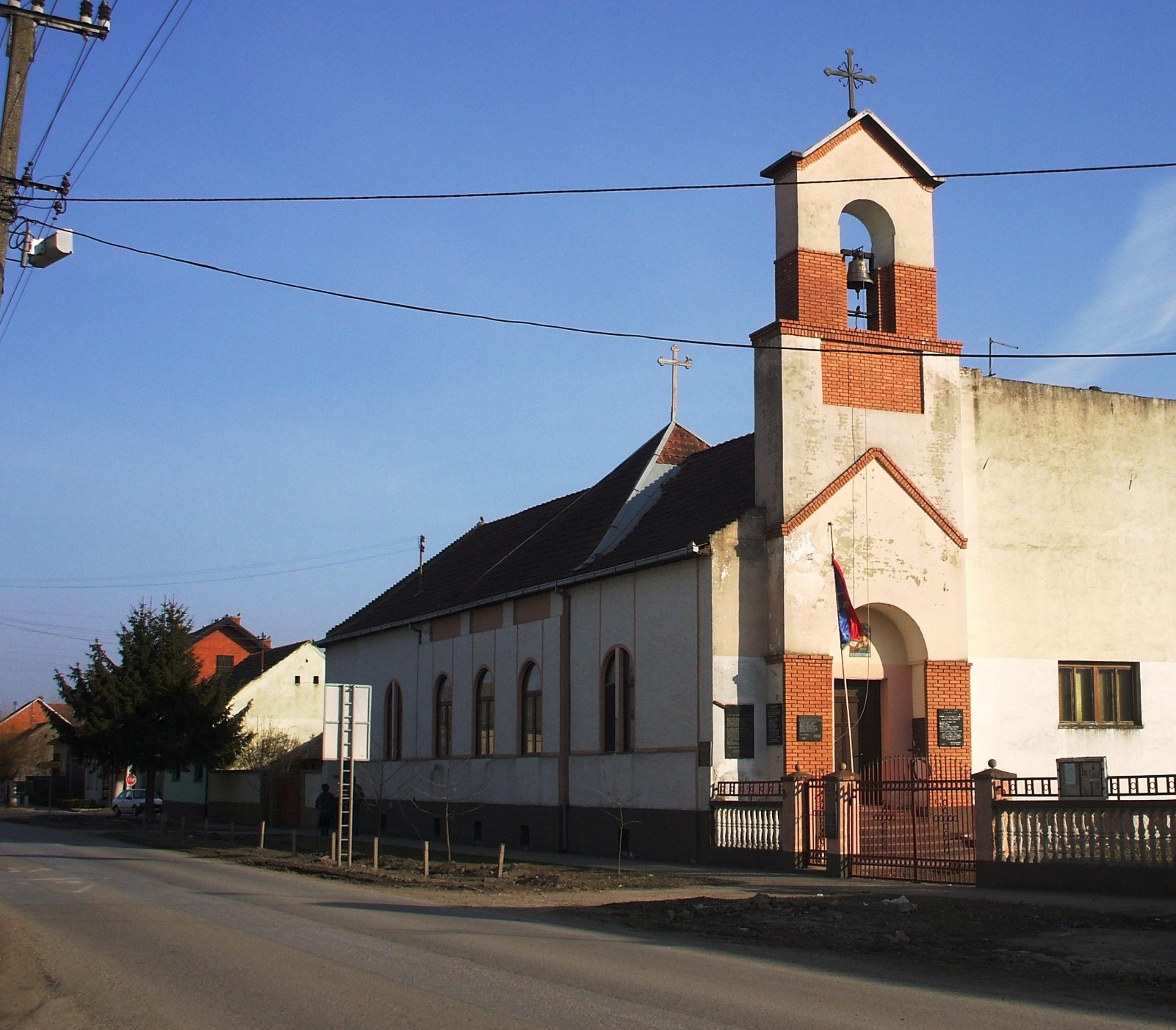

- Location within Vojvodina Location within Serbia Location within Europe
- Coordinates: 45°04′N 19°20′E
- Country: Serbia
- Province: Vojvodina
- Region: Syrmia
- District: Srem
- Municipality: Šid

Area
  - Total: 32.70 km^{2} (12.63 sq mi)
- Elevation: 93 m (305 ft)

Population (2011)
  - Total: 1,955
  - Density: 59.79/km^{2} (154.8/sq mi)
- Time zone: UTC+1 (CET)
  - Summer (DST): UTC+2 (CEST)
- Postal code: 22 224

Kukujevci (Serbian Cyrillic: Кукујевци) is a village located in the municipality of Šid, Srem District, Vojvodina, Serbia. As of 2011 census, it has a population of 1,955 inhabitants.

== Name ==
The name of the village in Serbian is plural.

== History ==
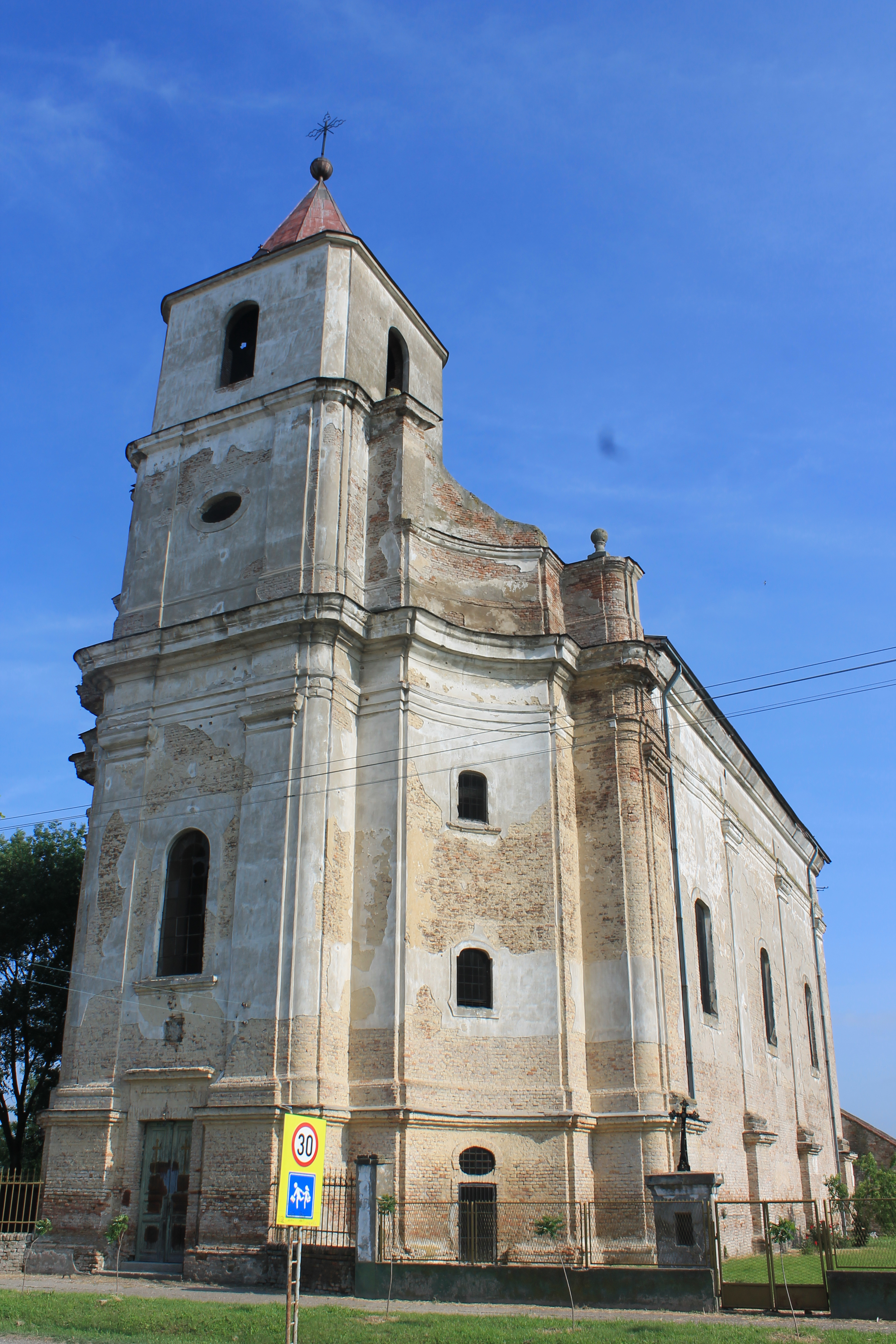
Roman Catholic Church in Kukujevci

Prior to the Yugoslav Wars, the population of the village was 89% Croat. During the Yugoslav Wars and particularly as a spillover from the Croatian War of Independence local Croat community in Kukujevci was exposed to harassment and persecution by Serbian nationalists leading to community's expulsion from the village. As a consequence of the war demographic structure of the village is today almost entirely different with 90% of population being ethnic Serbs, mostly Serb refugees who left after the collapse of the self-proclaimed SAO Western Slavonia or from other parts of Croatia. The new Serbian population has sought to rename the village to Lazarevo.

== See also ==
- List of places in Serbia
- List of cities, towns and villages in Vojvodina
- Kukujevci–Erdevik railway station
