= Perbál =

Perbál _{Perwall}
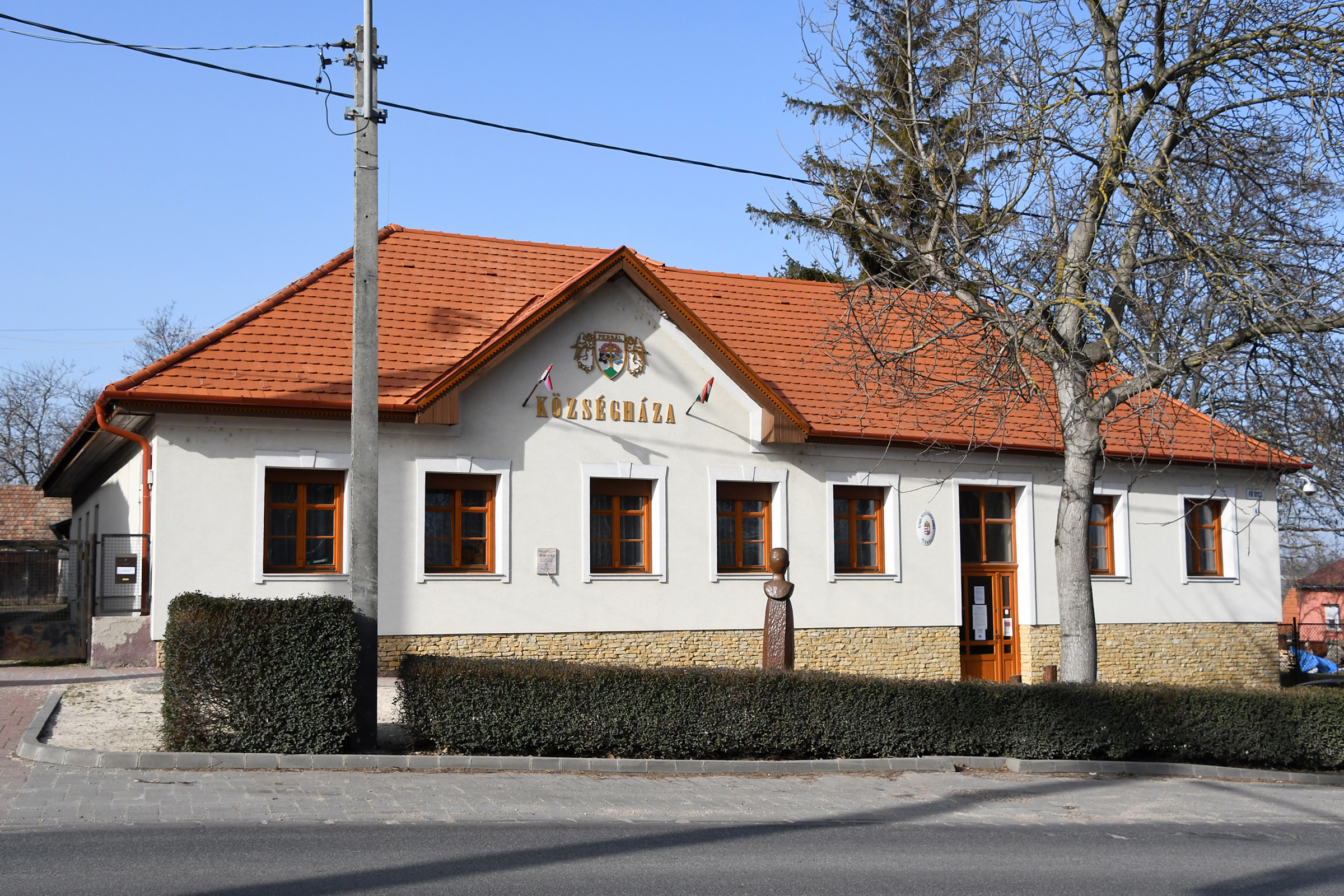
- Village hall

- Flag Coat of arms

- Location of Perbál _{Perwall} in Hungary
- Coordinates: 47.59135°N 18.75995°E
- Country: Hungary
- Region: Central Hungary
- County: Pest
- Subregion: Pilisvörösvári
- Rank: Village

Government
  - Mayor: Varga László

Area
  - Total: 25.65 km^{2} (9.90 sq mi)

Population (1 January 2008)
  - Total: 2,184
  - Density: 85.15/km^{2} (220.5/sq mi)
- Time zone: UTC+1 (CET)
  - Summer (DST): UTC+2 (CEST)
- Postal code: 2074
- Area code: +36 26
- KSH code: 28185
- Website: www.perbal.hu

Perbál (German: Perwall) is a village in Pest county, Budapest metropolitan area, Hungary. It has a population of 2,233 (2007).
