= Šid railway station =

Railway station in Serbia

Coordinates: 45°3′42″N 19°20′40″E

Šid railway station Железничка станица Шид
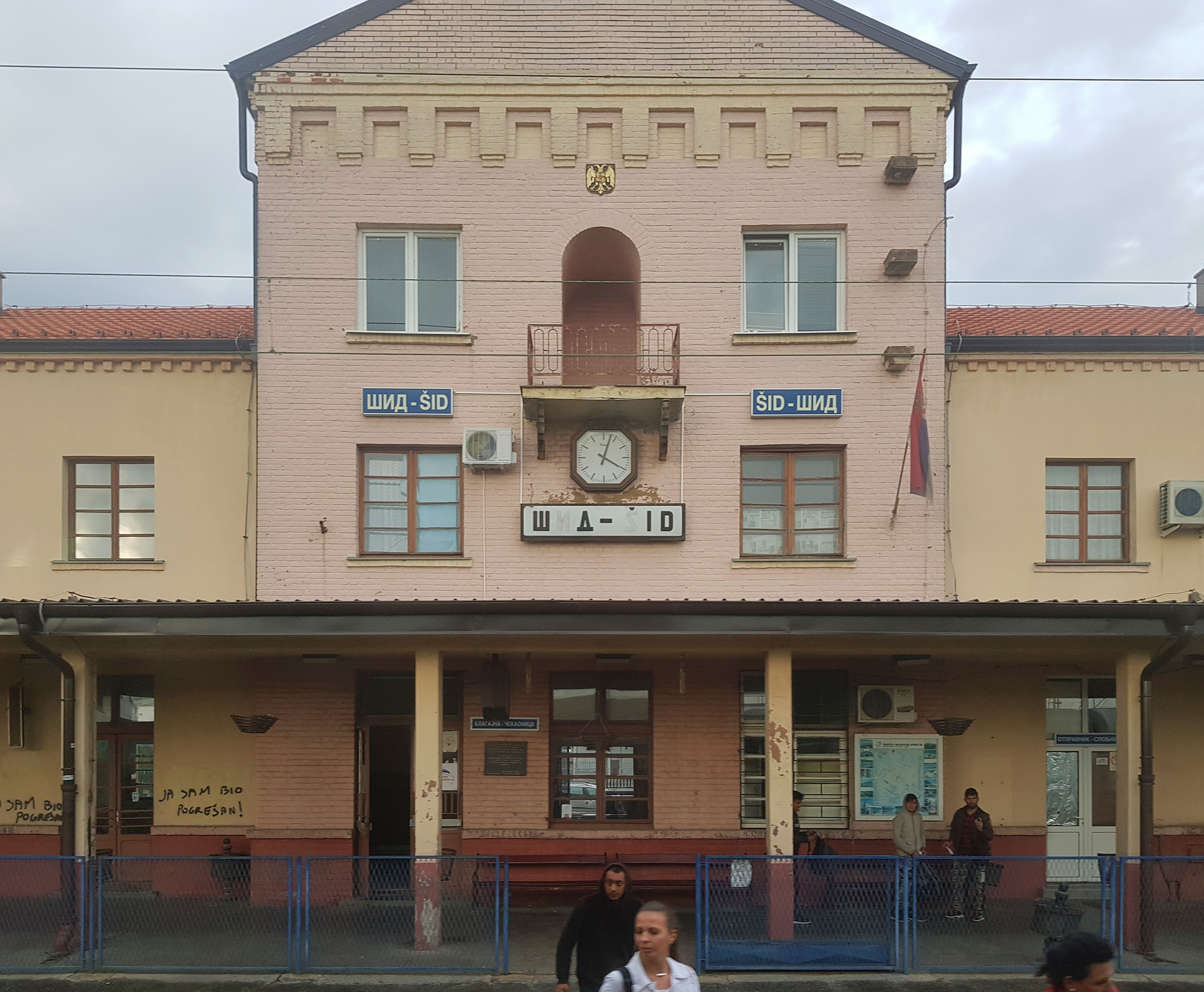
- Šid railway station

General information
- Location: Šid; Srem District (Vojvodina); Serbia
- Operator: Serbian Railways Infrastructure
- Line: Belgrade–Šid railway
- Tracks: 10
- Connections: Šid Central Bus Station next to the railway station.
Location

Šid railway station (Serbian Cyrillic: Железничка станица Шид) is a railway station on Belgrade–Šid, first on Bijeljina–Šid railway and railway junction. Located in Šid, Serbia. Railroad continues to Tovarnik in one direction, in another direction to Kukujevci-Erdevik, and a third direction towards to Sremska Rača. Šid railway station consists of 10 railway track.

== Gallery ==
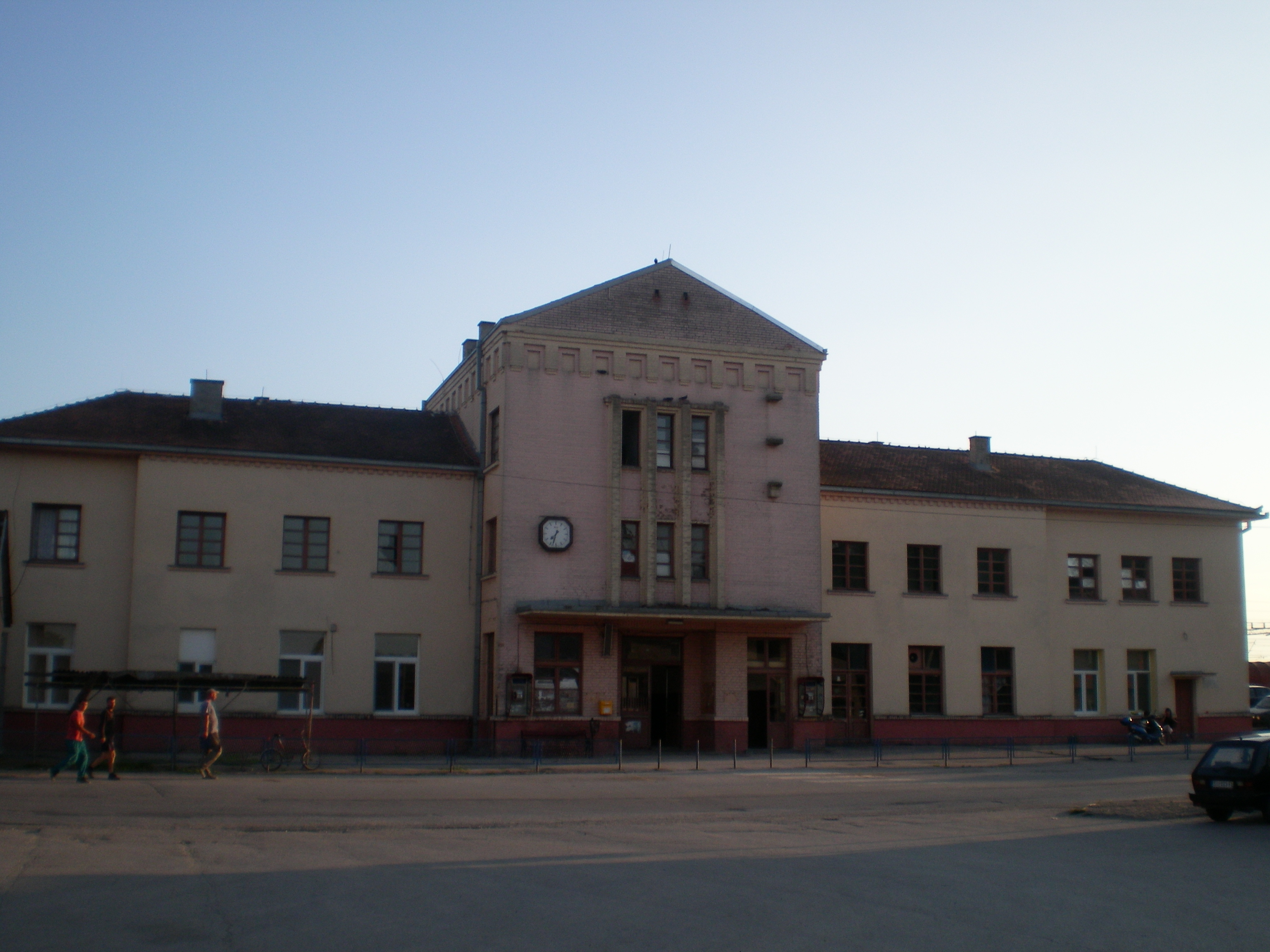
View from the Bus Station

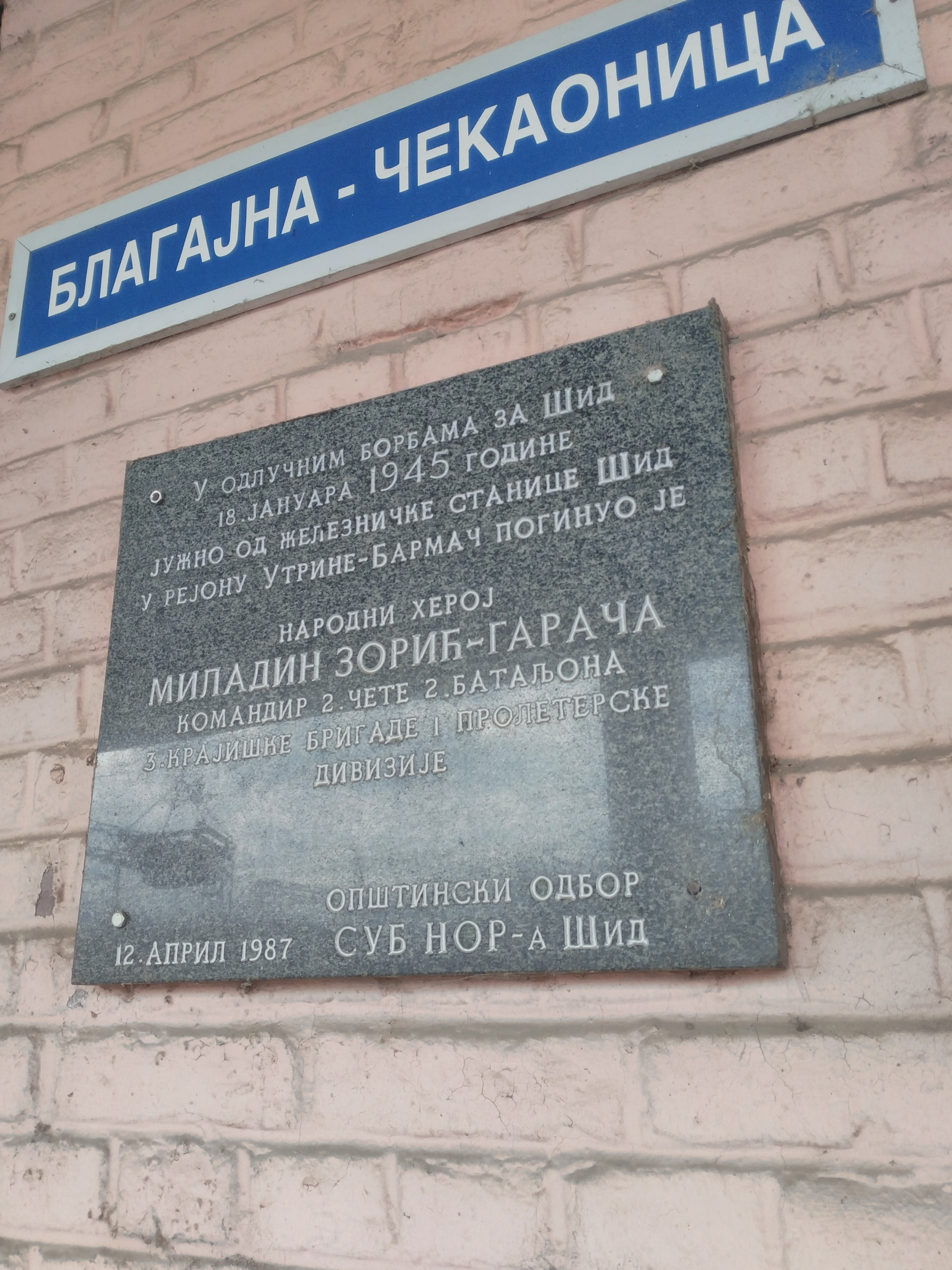
Miladin Zorić-Garača Memorial

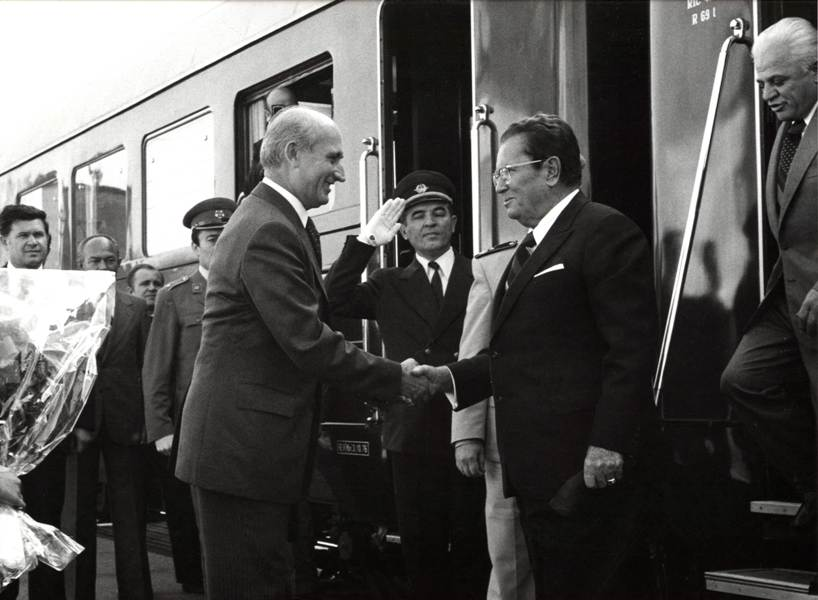
President of Yugoslavia Josip Broz Tito arrives at the Šid railway station

== In popular culture ==
In 1965 novel Garden, Ashes by Yugoslav author Danilo Kiš, Eduard Scham, father of the main character Andreas Scham, continued his life as the railway clerk at the Šid Railway Station following his personal bankruptcy.

== See also ==
- Serbian Railways

Preceding station	Šid railway station	Following station
Kukujevci–Erdevik	Belgrade–Šid railway Belgrade Centre to Šid route	Tovarnik (Croatia)
