= Premontre monastery church of Zsámbék =

Coordinates: 47.5494°N 18.7148°E

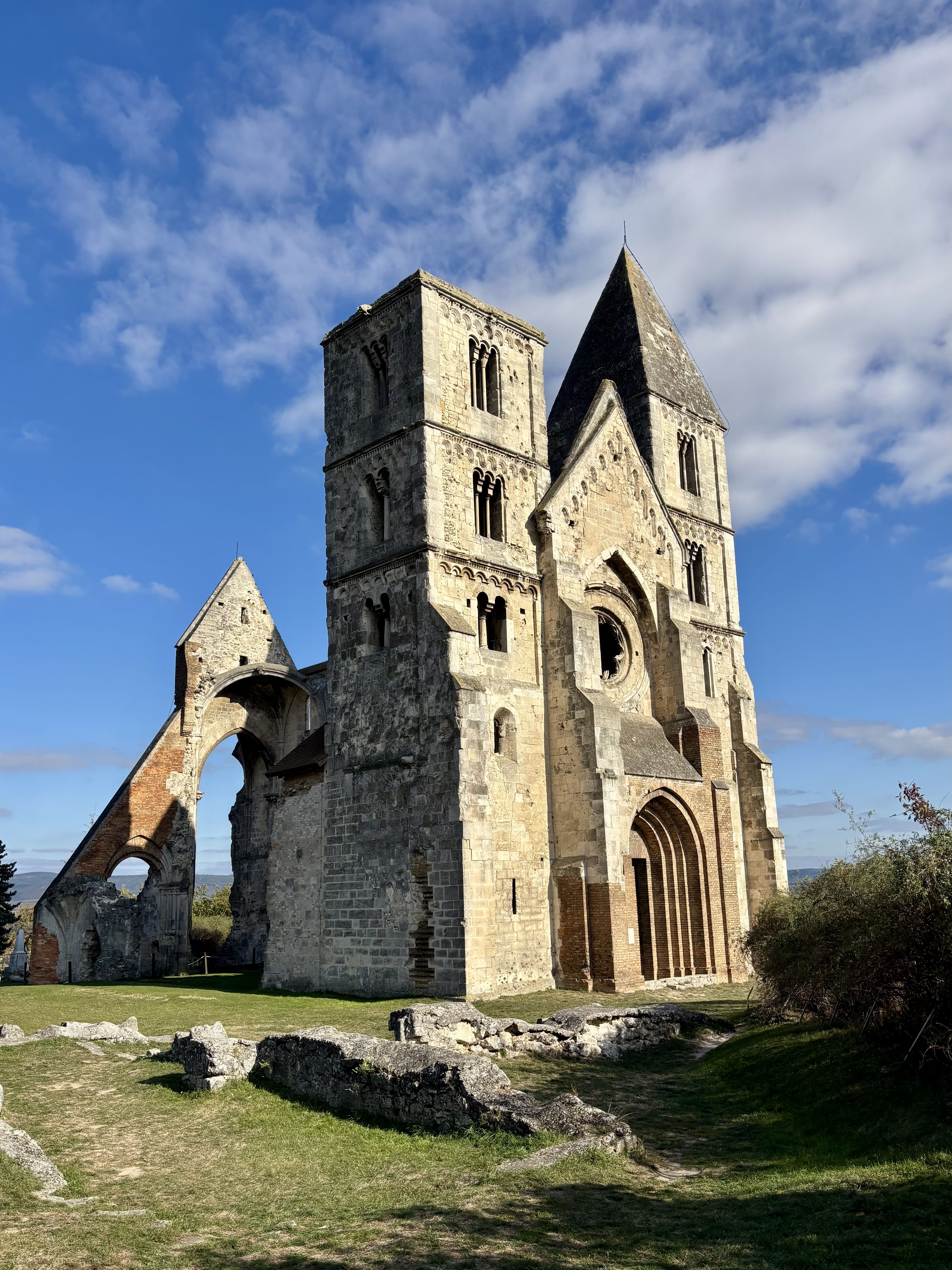
- Premontre monastery church of Zsámbék
- Location: Zsámbék
- Country: Hungary
- Denomination: Roman Catholic

History
- Founded: 1220

Architecture
- Style: Romanesque
- Groundbreaking: 1220
- Completed: 13th century
- Closed: 1763

The Premontre monastery church of Zsámbék is a ruin of a Romanesque church in the town of Zsámbék, Pest County, Hungary. The construction of the church started in 1220.

== History ==
The construction of the church started as a part of a Premonstratensian monastery. It was the third consecutive church standing at the same site. The construction was completed in the 13th century. It was a private family church (German: Geschlechterkirche), built by a single family, the gens Smaragd (the family of Aynard), and might have been the last of such churches in Hungary. The church was a three-nave basilica; the cloister was attached to one of the sides.

In 1398, the Aynards went out of favor and the king ordered their property to be confiscated. Zsámbék was transferred to the Maróthi family, and in 1477, when these became extinct, Matthias Corvinus transferred the monastery to the Pauline Fathers. The church and the monastery were subsequently rebuilt in the Gothic style.

The monastery was badly damaged during Turkish rule in Hungary. In the 17th century, the church became property of the Zichy family which used a chapel in the monastery for services instead. On June 28, 1763, the church collapsed as a result of an earthquake, and since then has been deserted.

== Gallery ==
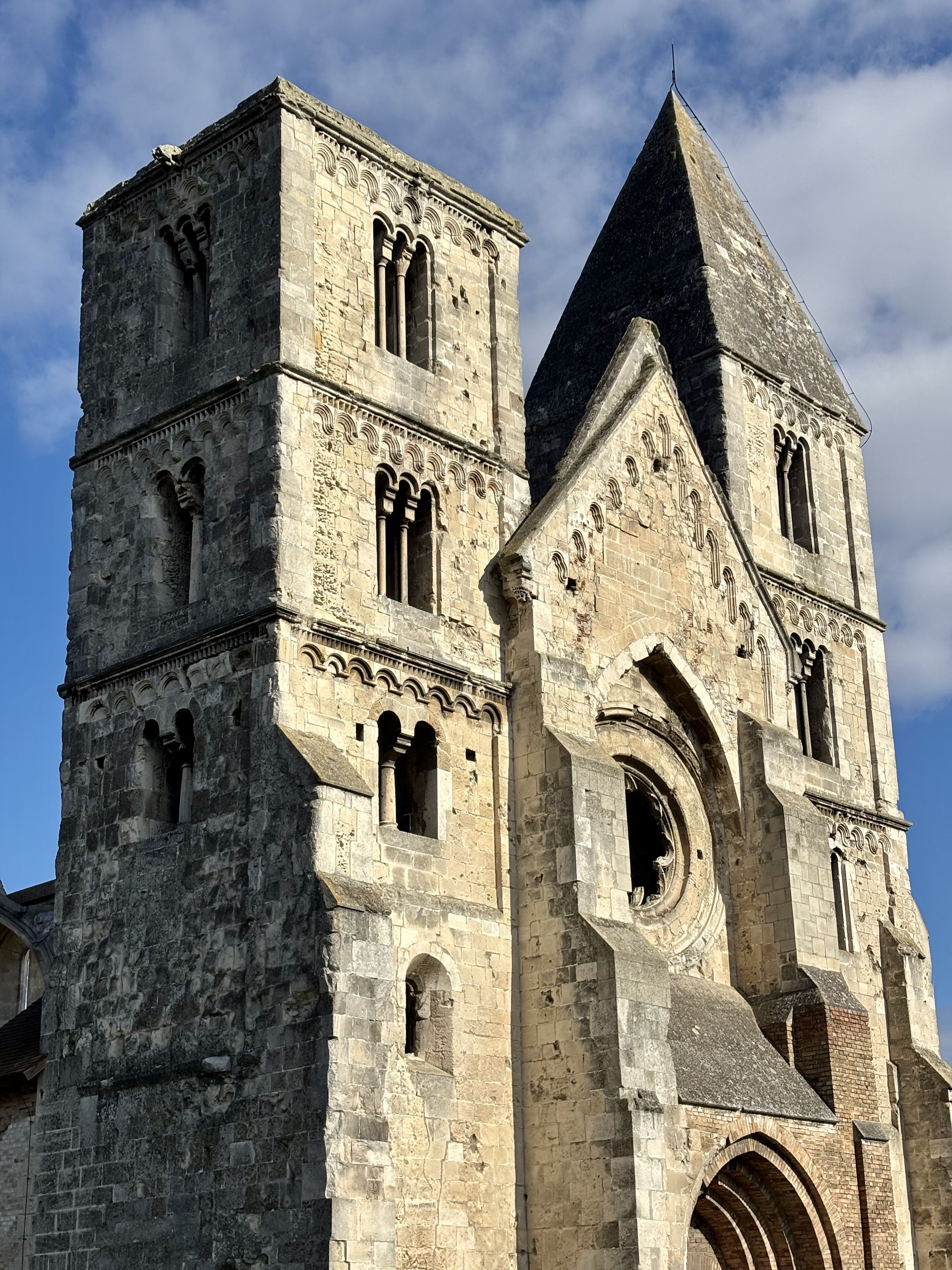

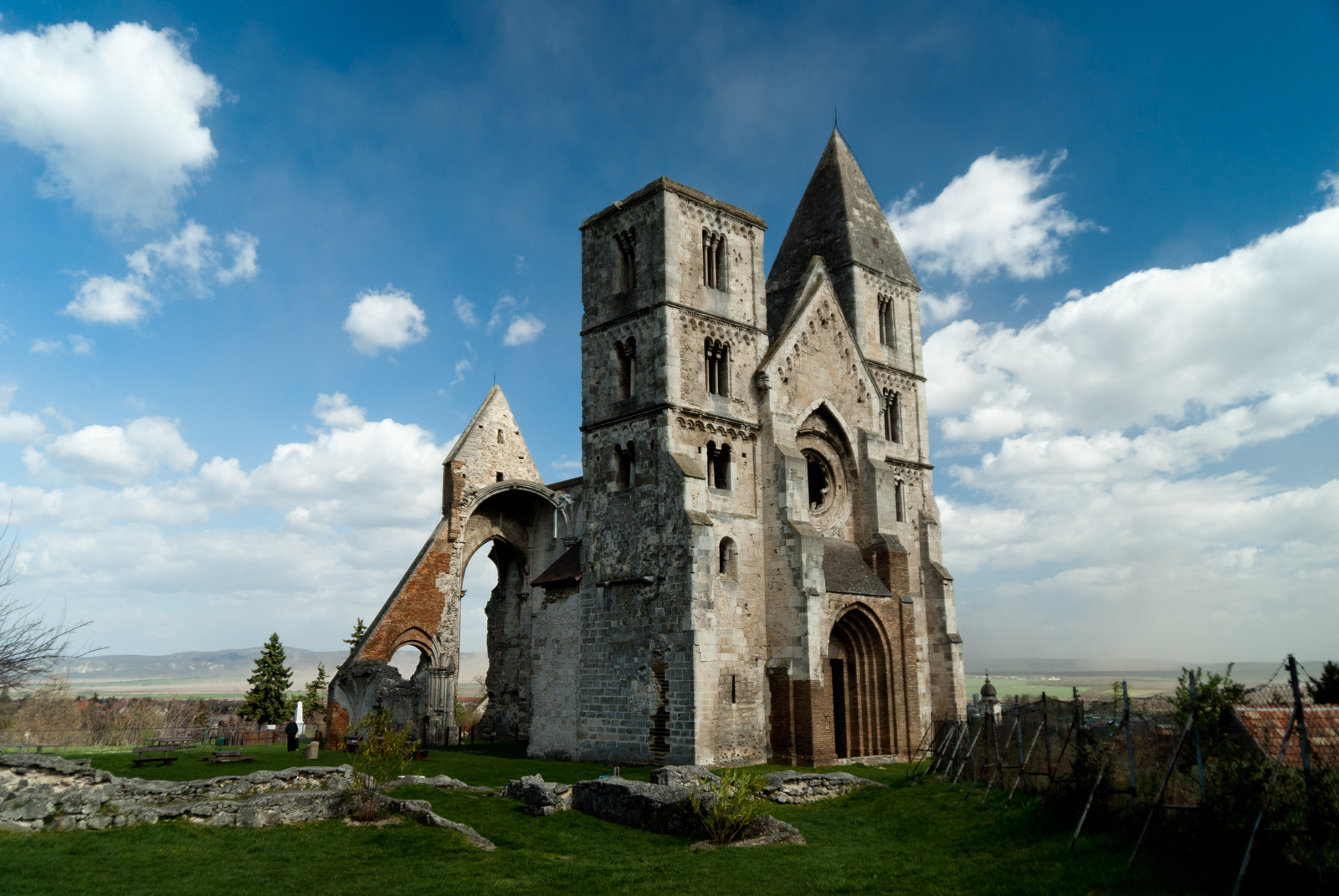

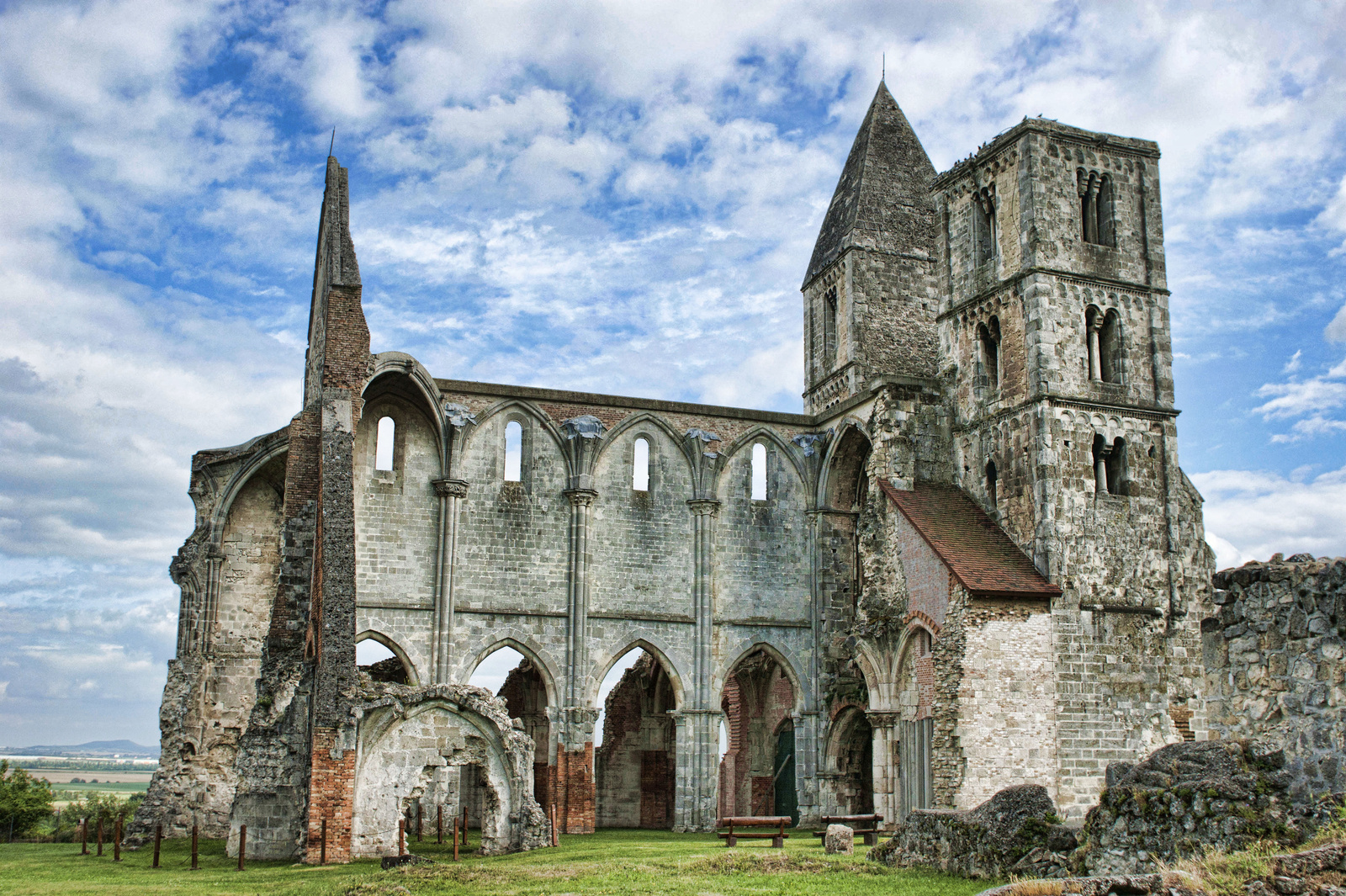

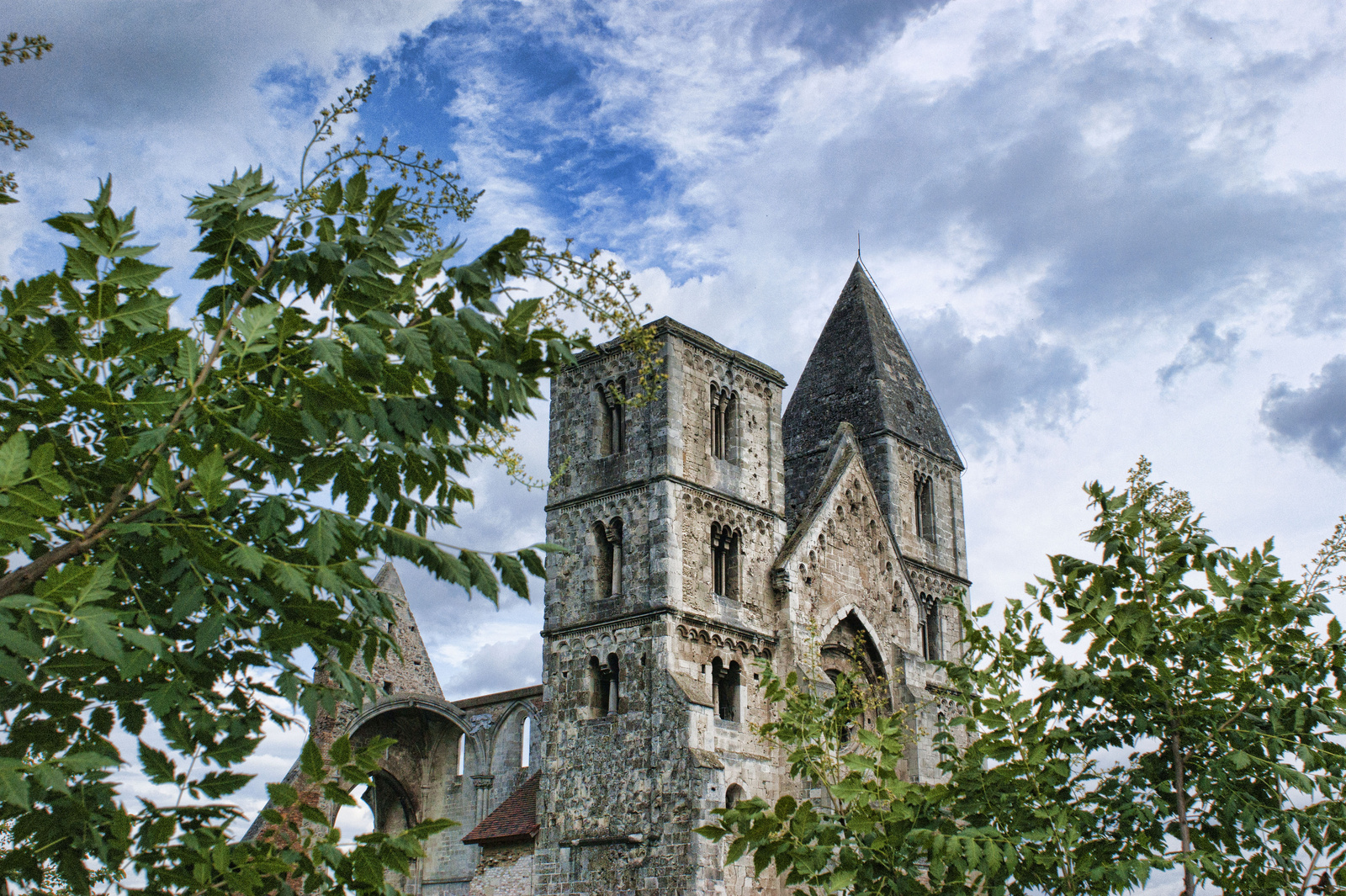

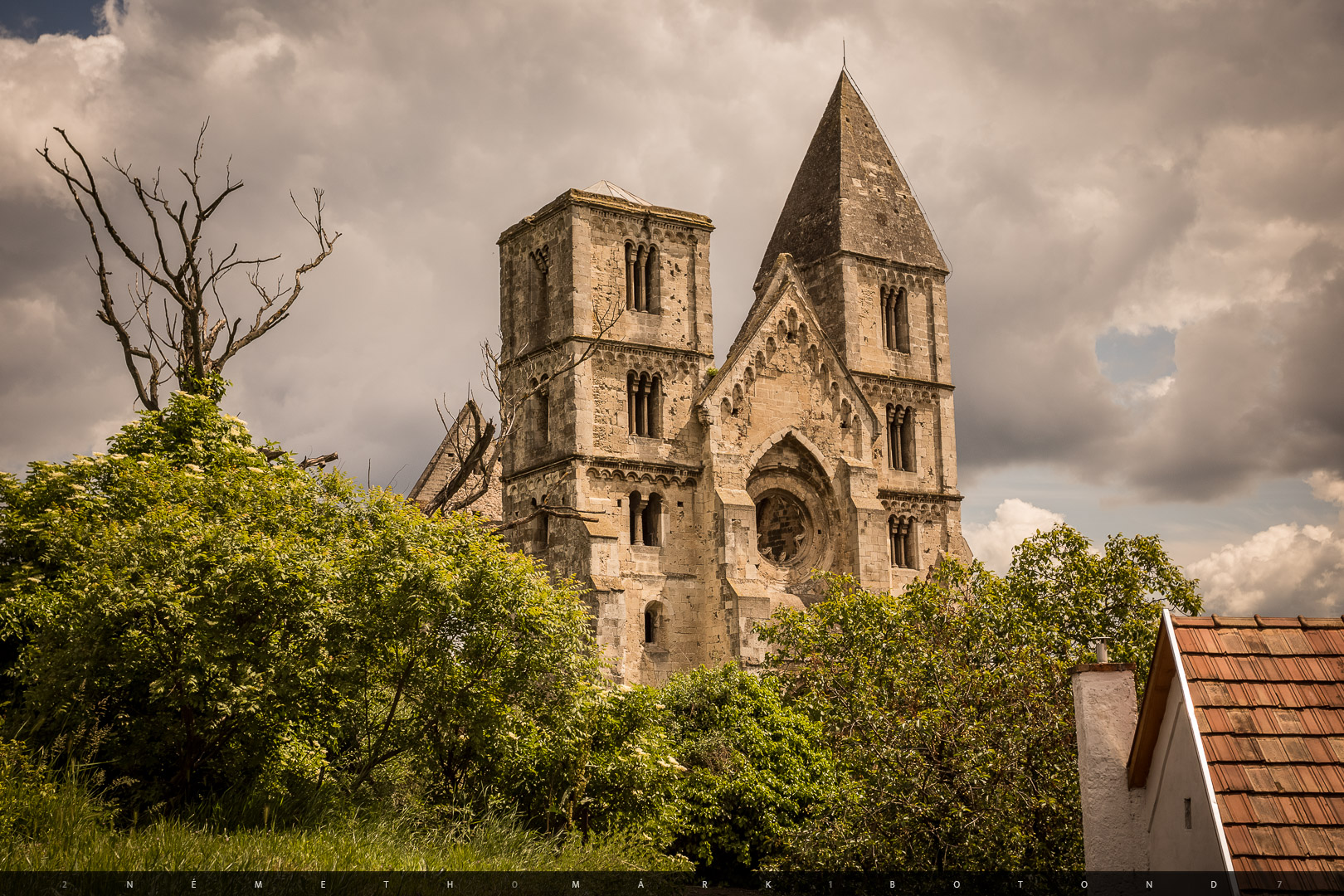

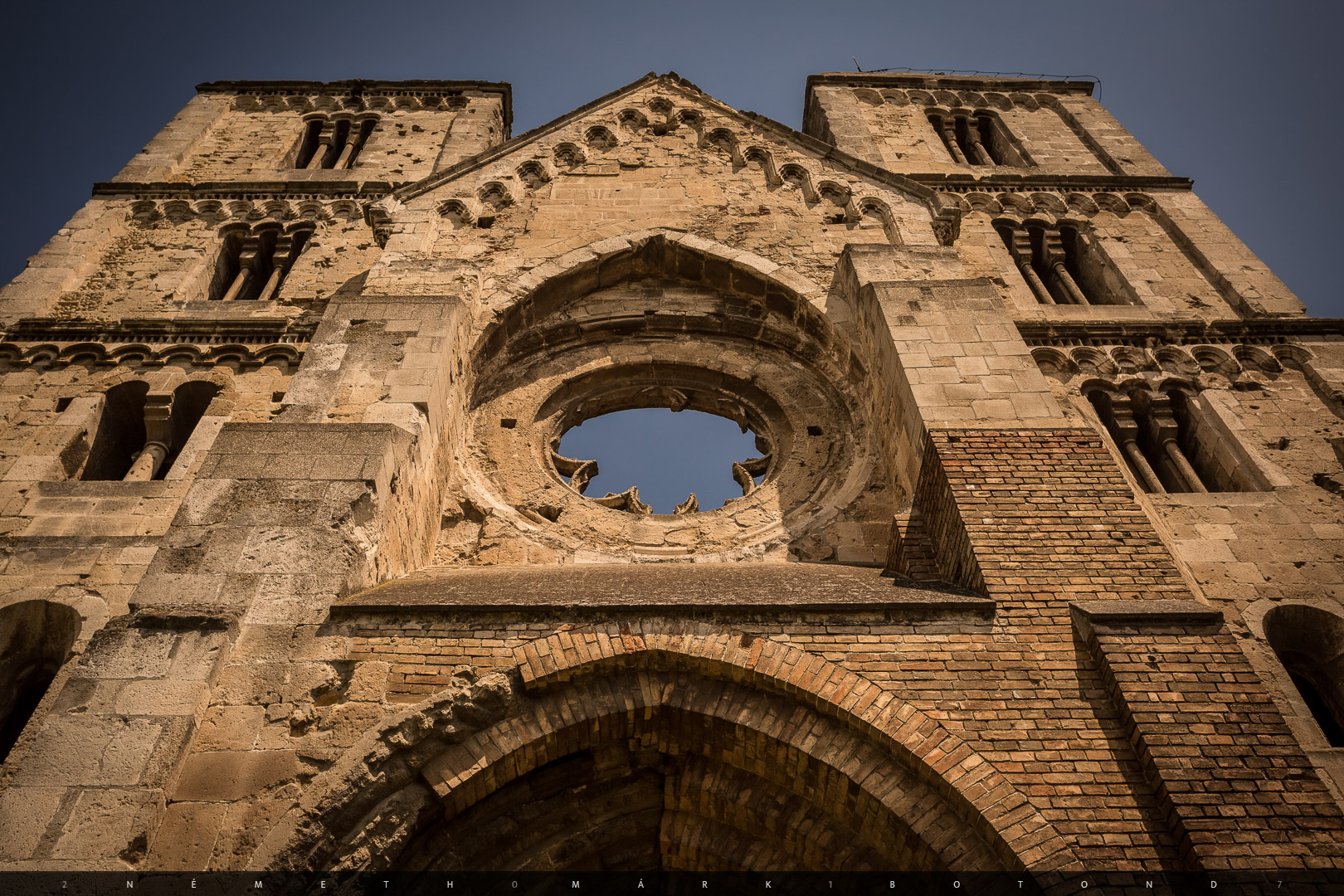
