= Belgrade–Šid railway =

Railway line in Serbia

Main line 101 Beograd Centar – Stara Pazova – Šid – state border – (Tovarnik) (Belgrade–Šid railway)

Overview
- Native name: Магистрална пруга 101 Београд Центар – Стара Пазова – Шид – државна граница – (Товарник)
- Line number: 1
- Locale: Serbia

Technical
- Line length: 121.95 km (75.8 mi)
- Track gauge: 1,435 mm (4 ft 8 1/2 in) standard gauge
- Electrification: 25 kV 50 Hz
- Operating speed: from 100 km/h (62.1 mph) to 200 km/h (124.3 mph)

The Belgrade–Šid railway (Serbian: Pruga Beograd-Šid) officially designated the Main line 101 Beograd Centar – Stara Pazova – Šid – state border – (Tovarnik) is a 121.95-kilometre (75.78 mi) long railway line in Serbia that connects the city of Belgrade with the Croatian railway network and the city of Zagreb. Its route follows the Sava river valley. It is an integral part of the Pan-European Corridor X, running from Salzburg and Ljubljana towards Skopje and Thessaloniki. It is electrified and mostly double-tracked.

== History ==
It was the route of the Orient Express service from 1919 to 1977.

As part of the Zagreb–Belgrade railway, electrification was finished in 1970.

== Gallery ==
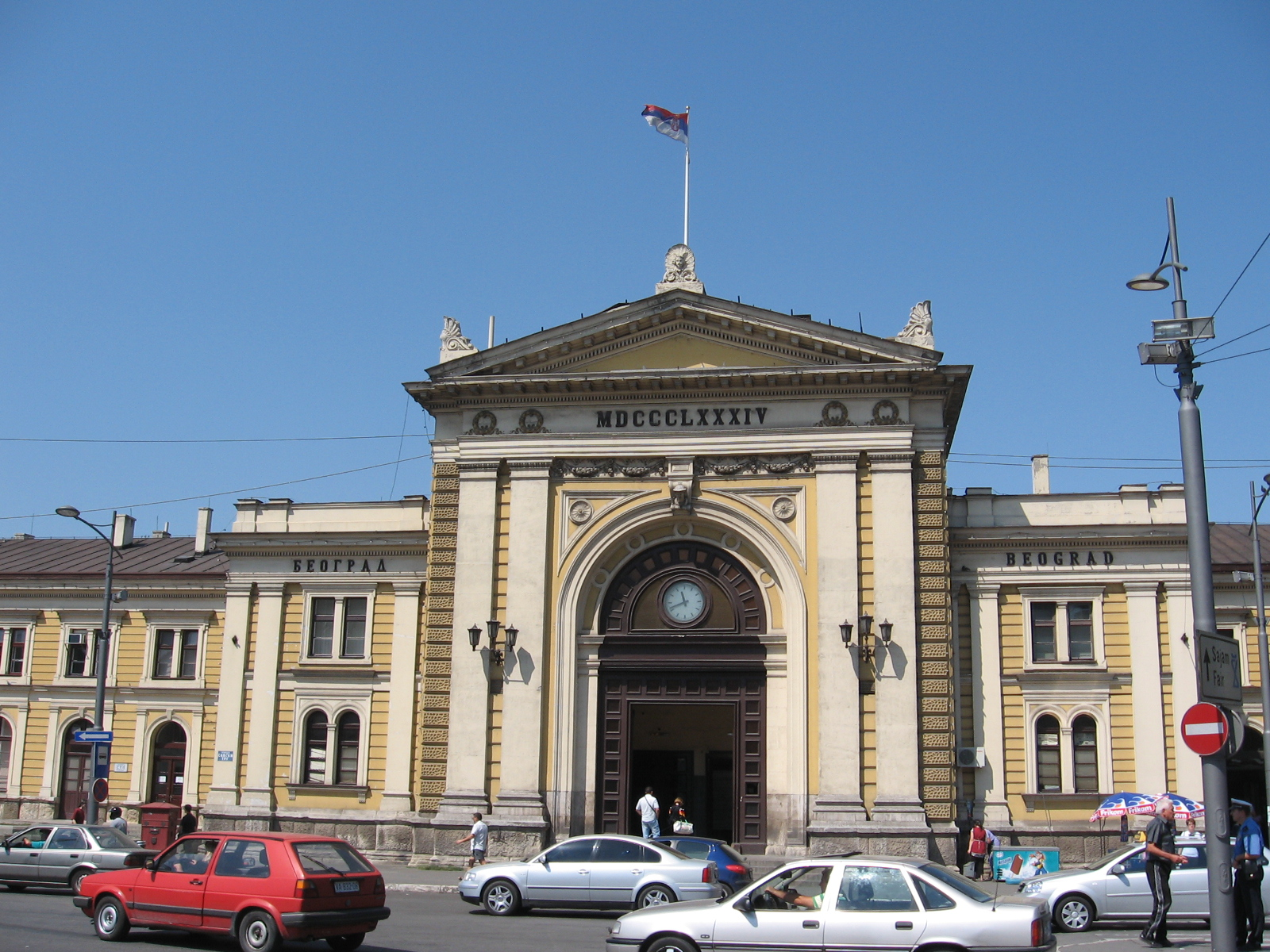
Belgrade main station

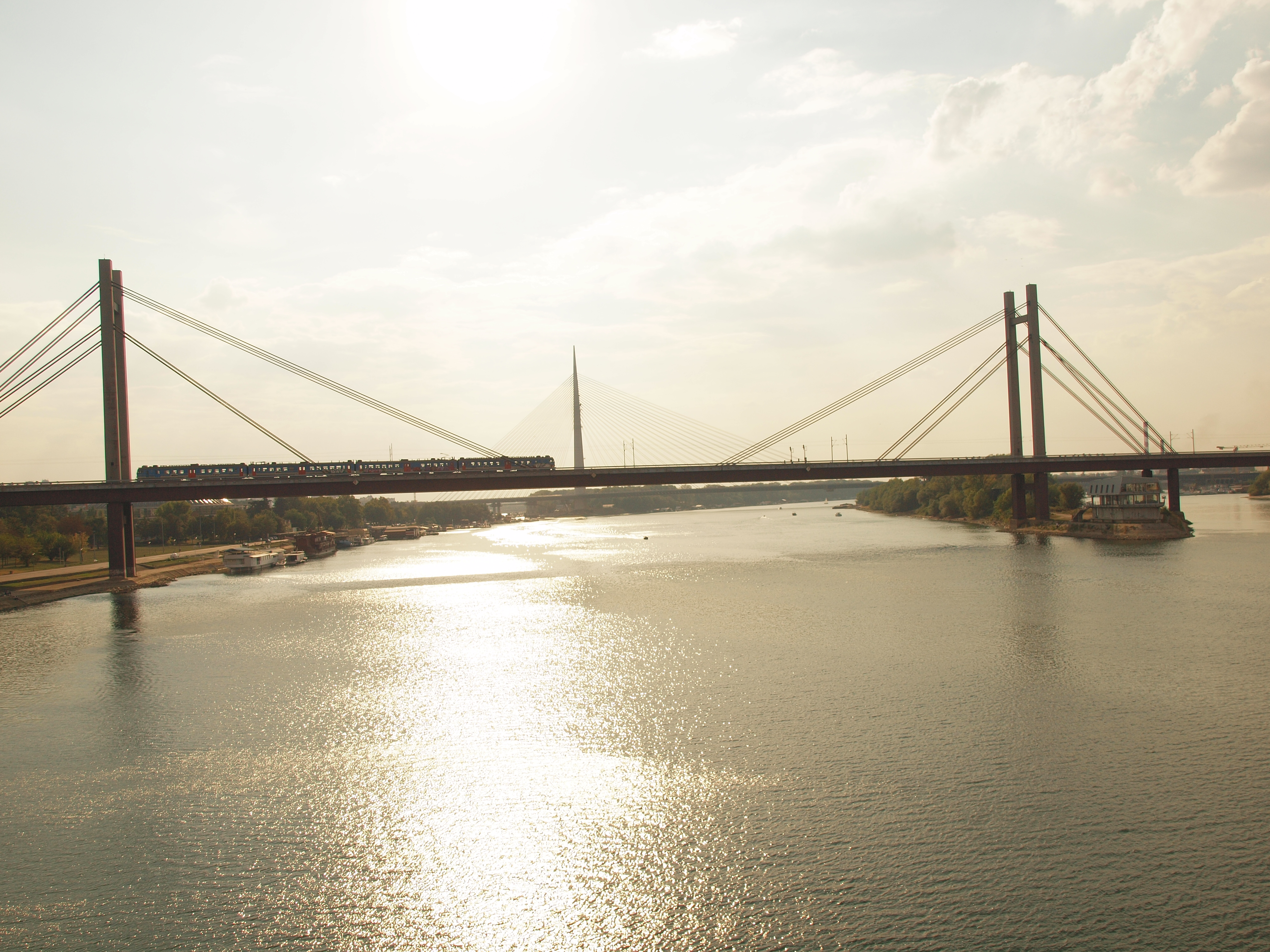
New Railway bridge in Belgrade

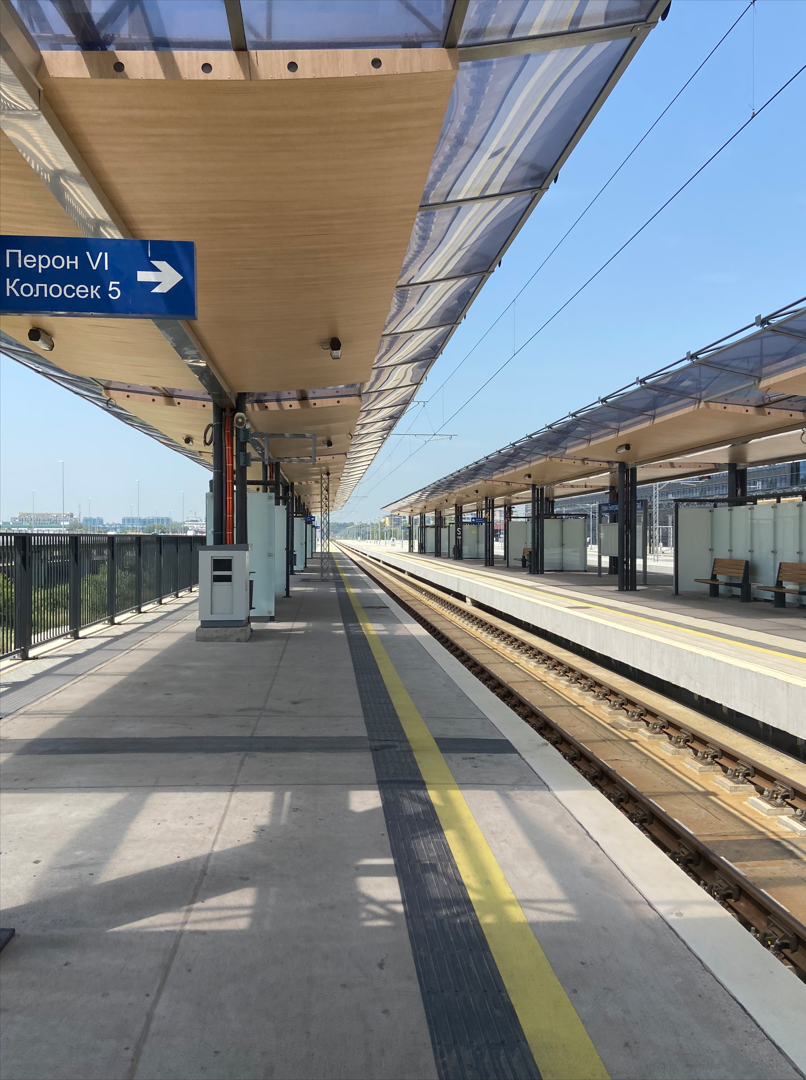
Novi Beograd station

== See also ==
- Pan-European Corridor X
