= Lawrence, son of Ampud =

Ispán of Podgorje
- Reign: c. 1227–1229
- Successor: Alexander (?)
- Died: after 1229
- Father: Ampud II
- Mother: N von Andechs

Lawrence, son of Ampud (Hungarian: Ampod fia Lőrinc; died after 1229) was a noble in the Kingdom of Hungary in the first decades of the 13th century, who served in the court of Coloman, Duke of Slavonia.

== Family ==
Lawrence was born into an influential noble family, which possessed landholdings in Slavonia beyond the river Drava. His paternal grandfather was Ampud I, a skilled military commander, who served as Ban of Slavonia and Palatine of Hungary during the reigns of kings Stephen III and Béla III. Lawrence was one of the three sons of Ampud II, who served as ispán of Szolnok County in 1199, and an unidentified daughter of Count Berthold III of Andechs, Margrave of Istria. Through the maternal lineage, Lawrence was the first cousin of Gertrude of Merania, a daughter of Berthold IV and spouse of King Andrew II. Lawrence had two elder brothers; Denis was one of the most staunchest confidants of Andrew since the 1210s, and a key figure of the royal economic reform, while Michael belonged to the rival baronial group centered around Duke Béla in the same time. Lawrence had no known wives nor descendants.

== Violent actions ==
Lawrence entered the service of Duke Coloman – King Andrew's second son – who was made Duke of Slavonia in 1226. Around the same time, Lawrence was appointed ispán (župan) of the castle district of Gorica in the territory of Zagreb County, which belonged to Coloman's duchy. However, Lawrence committed crimes and acts of domination (factum potentiale), abusing his office. As a result, Coloman deprived Lawrence of his position. His elder brothers, Denis and Michael, intervened for his sake, requesting that the duke take him back into his good graces.

Consequently, Lawrence was appointed ispán of the castle district of Podgorje, which also lay in Zagreb County (present-day ruins near Draga Svetojanska in Croatia). However, Lawrence continued his violent actions. He pillaged and devastated 24 villages surrounding the fort in the belief that he would "find treasures there that he could steal". Duke Coloman again dismissed him from his position and the royal tribunal of Andrew II confiscated all his properties. Thanks to his family ties, Lawrence eventually had to get rid of only one estate, Lipóc in Sáros County (today Kecerovský Lipovec, Slovakia). In 1229, Duke Coloman sold this landholding (later castle) and its accessories (i.e. tax exemption) to his faithful confidant Demetrius Aba for 1000 marks. There is no further information about Lawrence. Lipóc became one of the two eponymous estates of the Lipóc branch of the gens (clan) Aba, which reached its peak by the first half of the 14th century, when Demetrius Nekcsei (or Lipóci) directed the economic policy of Hungary.

== Sources ==
- Font, Márta; Barabás, Gábor (2017). Kálmán, Halics királya, Szlavónia hercege, 1208–1241 [Coloman, King of Halych, Duke of Slavonia, 1208–1241] (in Hungarian). Magyar Történelmi Társulat–Kronosz Kiadó. ISBN 978-963-467-000-1.
- Wertner, Mór (1895). "Ompud nádor és utódai [Palatine Ampud and his Descendants]". Turul (in Hungarian). 13 (2): 91–93. ISSN 1216-7258.
- Zsoldos, Attila (2011). Magyarország világi archontológiája, 1000–1301 [Secular Archontology of Hungary, 1000–1301] (in Hungarian). História, MTA Történettudományi Intézete. ISBN 978-963-9627-38-3.
