= Denis, son of Ampud =

Hungarian noble

Palatine of Hungary
- Reign: 1227–1228; 1231–1234
- Predecessor: Nicholas Szák (1st term); Mojs (2nd term)
- Successor: Mojs (1st term); Denis Tomaj (2nd term)
- Died: 1236
- Issue: Denis (?); Stephen (alleged extramarital)
- Father: Ampud II
- Mother: N von Andechs

Denis, son of Ampud, also Denis, son of Apod (Hungarian: Ampod fia Dénes; fl. 1216 – died 1236), was an influential baron in the Kingdom of Hungary in the first decades of the 13th century. He was Master of the treasury between 1216 and 1224. He was also ispán of at least three counties.

== Family ==
Denis was born into an influential noble family in the last decades of the 12th century. His paternal grandfather was Ampud I, a skilled military commander, who served as Ban of Slavonia and Palatine of Hungary during the reigns of kings Stephen III and Béla III. Denis was one of the three sons of Ampud II, who served as ispán of Szolnok County in 1199, and an unidentified daughter of Count Berthold III of Andechs, Margrave of Istria. It is plausible they belonged to the accompaniment of Duke Andrew in Croatia and Dalmatia, who ruled the province beyond the river Drava as a de facto sovereign monarch and constantly rebelled against his elder brother King Emeric of Hungary throughout the latter's reign.

Through the maternal lineage, Denis was the first cousin of Gertrude of Merania, a daughter of Berthold IV and spouse of Andrew, which laid the groundwork for the rapid and long-standing ascension for young Denis after Duke Andrew ascended the Hungarian throne in 1205. Denis had two brothers, Michael, who belonged to the rival baronial group centered around Duke Béla in the 1220s, and Lawrence, who held ispánates in Zagreb County, Slavonia around the same period, in the service of Duke Coloman.

== Career ==
=== Master of the treasury ===
The early life and career of Denis is unknown, it is plausible that he was younger than Andrew for at least a decade and raised in the ducal court in Croatia and Dalmatia. He inherited the family possessions beyond the river Drava from his father. Denis was first mentioned in contemporary records in 1216, when he became Master of the treasury in the royal court of Andrew II, replacing Solomon Atyusz. He held the dignity for eight years until 1224, with a brief interruption during the movement of Golden Bull of 1222. Beside that, Denis also served as ispán of Újvár County (also Abaúj) from 1216 to 1219 and was the first known ispán of the neighboring Szepes County in 1216. Thereafter, he administered Bács County between 1220 and 1222. During his political career spanning two decades, Denis elevated to the staunchest confidant of Andrew's policy in Hungary, whose influence and career, depending on the balance of power between Andrew II and his eldest son Duke Béla – who had long opposed his father's rule –, were somewhat uplifting or diminishing.

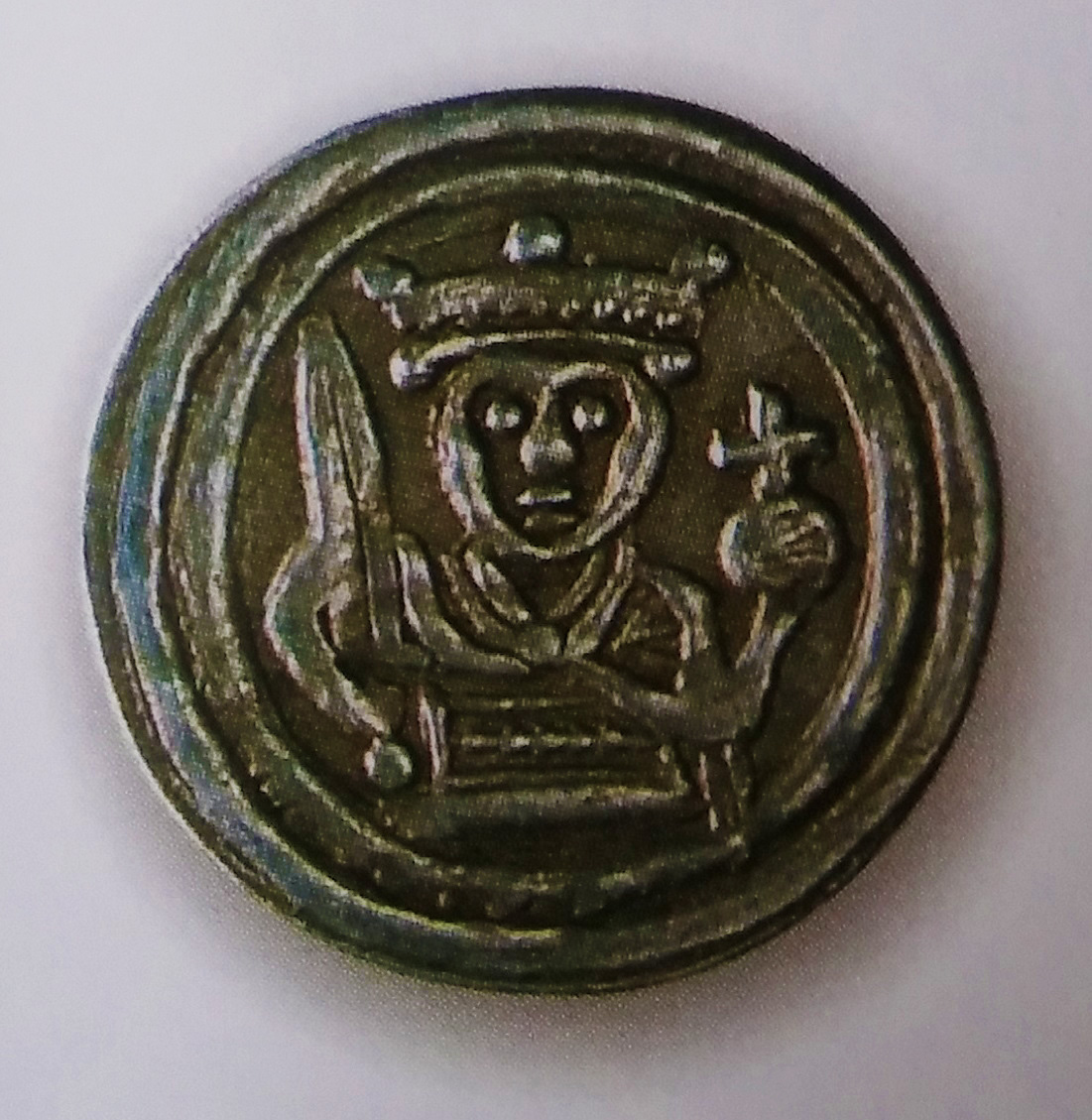
Coin of Andrew II of Hungary

Since the beginning of his rule, Andrew II introduced a new policy for royal grants, which he called "new institutions" in one of his charters. This new phenomenon altered the relations between the monarchs and the Hungarian lords. When Denis was installed as Master of the treasury in 1215 or 1216, he became a key figure of Andrew's economic policy, according to historian Bálint Hóman. During his term of office, the position of Master of the treasury became a permanent dignity with defined and circumscribed jurisdiction, elevating to the grand officers of the realm. In this capacity, Denis was responsible for the administration of the royal chamber. However, by that time, royal revenues had significantly diminished, because Andrew distributed large portions of the royal domain – royal castles and all estates attached to them – as inheritable grants to his supporters in the previous decade, declaring that "the best measure of a royal grant is its being immeasurable." To eliminate this, it was justified to reform the economy of the kingdom and adaptation of a new economic policy, which was the first such large-scale mutation in Hungary. Upon the advice of Denis, Andrew II imposed new taxes (for instance, annual extraordinary tax) and farmed out royal income from minting, salt trade and custom duties – even eligible for Jews and Muslims. The yearly exchange of coins also produced more revenue for the royal chamber. Beside the royal mintage in Esztergom, Andrew and Denis had established royal mints throughout the kingdom (for instance, in Buda, Csanád, Syrmia and Zagreb) in the upcoming years, decentralizing the royal coinage. However, these measures provoked discontent in Hungary, whereas it has created a contradiction between the beneficiaries of the new measures and the internal opposition which centered around Duke Béla. With the establishment of the new organization, the powers of the Master of the treasury necessarily expanded, who was first the royal treasurer guarding the crop income of royal private farms accumulated in warehouses. Now the center of gravity of the royal household shifts from dominions to jura regalia, and Denis transformed the system of royal economy from one based on crop management to one based on monetary income, its powers are gradually extended to the whole field of financial administration and the chief executive officer rises to the rank of a national office of a purely financial nature, according to Bálint Hóman.

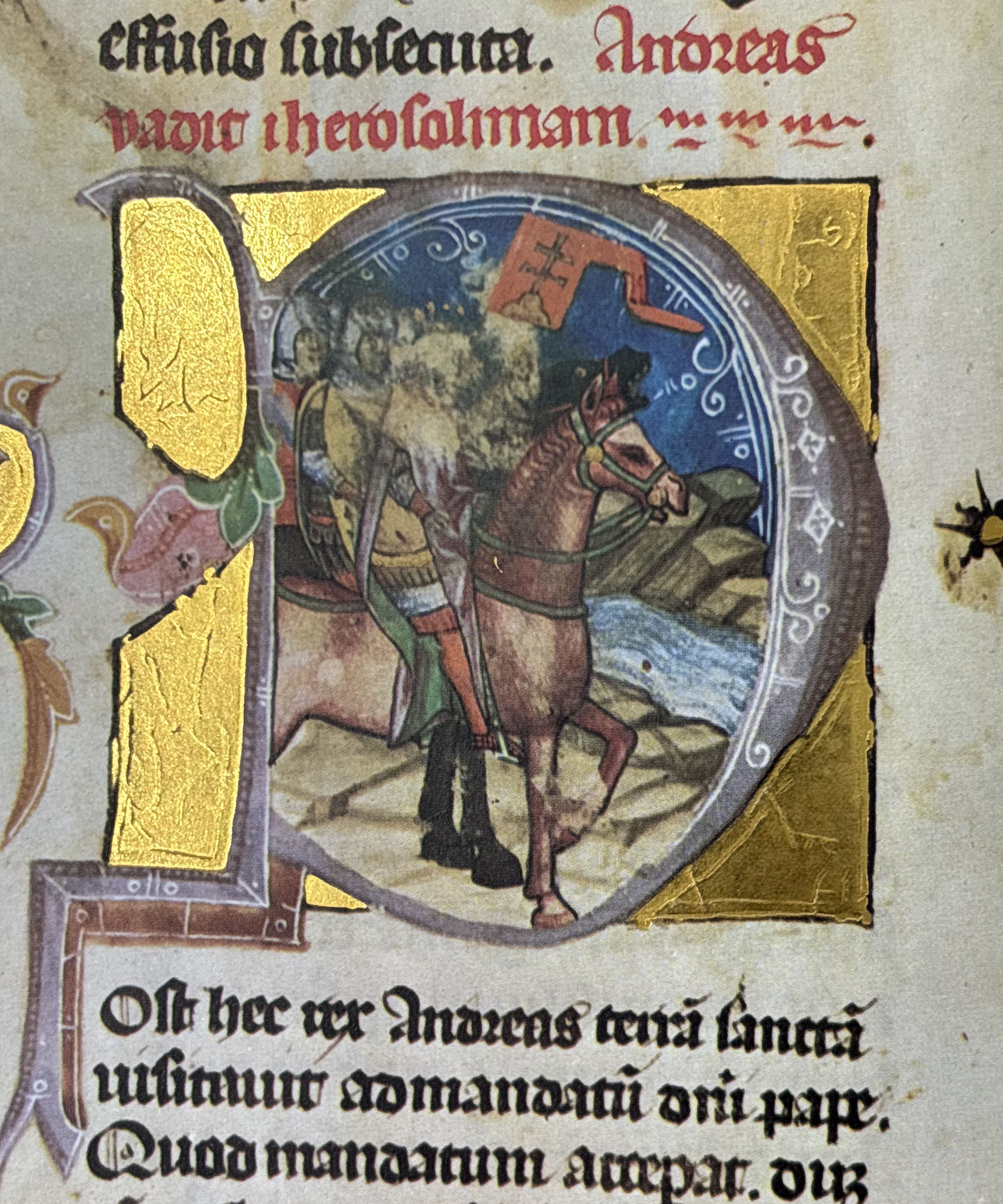
Andrew II at the head of his crusader army (from the Illuminated Chronicle)

Denis participated in the Fifth Crusade under the command of Andrew II between summer 1217 and early 1218, along with several Hungarian magnates and prelates, for instance Ladislaus Kán and Demetrius Csák. Crossing the Jordan River, Denis led the Hungarian contingent within the crusade army in order to besiege and capture the fortress of Al-Adil I at Mount Tabor in November–December 1217, while Andrew II stayed away from the military conflict and collected Christian relics. Thereafter, Denis and his Hungarian troops participated in the skirmishes at the Anti-Lebanon Mountains against the Ayyubids at the turn of 1217 and 1218. In his contemporary work, Arab historian Abu Shama mistakenly referred to Denis as Andrew's nephew ("the son of the king's sister"), while the Estoire d'Eracles described him as a "rich man". Andrew II decided to return Hungary at the very beginning of 1218, and Denis and the majority of the Hungarian contingent accompanied him.

When they returned to Hungary, Andrew was in massive debt because of his crusade, which forced him to impose extraordinarily high taxes and debase coinage, which measures Denis directed. The continuous employment of Jews and Muslims to administer royal revenues also caused a discord between Andrew and the Holy See starting in the early 1220s. The royal servants – who were landowners directly subject to the monarch's power and obliged to fight in the royal army – assembled, forcing Andrew to dismiss Julius Kán, Denis and his other officials in the first half of 1222. Andrew was also forced to issue a royal charter, the Golden Bull of 1222, which summarized the liberties of the royal servants. Few months later, the Golden Bull movement failed and Andrew restored his confidants to their formerly deprived positions, including Denis, already in the second half of the year. Denis retained his dignity of Master of the treasury until 1224. After Duke Coloman and his wife settled in Szepes (Spiš) region in 1222, near the Hungarian–Galician border, Andrew entrusted Denis to support him politically (it is possible he still held the dignity of ispán in the county, but there is no source for that). There, Denis had plausibly received estates in the region, Vidernik and Savnik (present-day Vydrník and Spišský Štiavnik in Slovakia, respectively). Denis established the Cistercian abbey of Szepes (or Savnik) with the consent and support of Coloman in 1223. He invited Cistercian friars from Wąchock Abbey in the Kingdom of Poland in order to settle in the newly erected monastery. Sometime later, the monastery was put under direct royal patronage.

=== Palatine of Hungary ===
Denis was replaced as Master of the treasury by Denis Tomaj for unknown reasons in 1224. He was appointed Palatine of Hungary (Latin: comes palatinus), the most prestigious secular dignity in the kingdom, by Andrew II in 1227. Denis was the only known palatine during the reign of Andrew II, who did not hold any ispánate beside his dignity. During his first term as palatine, Denis entered into a conflict of jurisdiction with the church in many cases. According to Archbishop Robert of Esztergom, when listed his "sins" years later (in 1232, see below), Denis not only deprived many clerics of their revenues and office, but he had also beaten and treated them with disgrace; made several forms of domination on the provost and parish priest of Szepes; and even slapped John, the provost of Pressburg (today Bratislava, Slovakia) in his face. Because of his anti-church violations, even Uros, the abbot of Pannonhalma did not take his legal affairs to the palatinal court, despite his earlier and later habits in this context. Similarly to his contemporaries, Denis had no permanent palatinal court. During his first term (1227–1228), he judged over lawsuits throughout the kingdom, for instance in Somogy, Nógrád, Baranya (beyond the Drava) and Požega counties according to the surviving documents. Andrew II sent Denis on a diplomatic mission to the Bulgarian Empire in 1227, visiting the court of Tsar Ivan Asen II, Andrew's son-in-law. Denis' seal was preserved by an undated charter which is currently kept in the Heiligenkreuz Abbey. It depicts two opposing ascending dragons in a blazon with the circumscription "Sigillum Dionysii palatini".

By 1228, Duke Béla's supporters took power in the royal council after another wave of dissatisfaction. Andrew was forced to authorize his son to revise his previous land grants throughout Hungary. As Palatine, Denis directed the restitution of the Pecheneg lands; he fulfilled his compulsory official duty by "taking back, by the order of the king, all the alienated Pecheneg lands". Historian Attila Zsoldos, however, connected this data to Denis's second term as palatine in the years 1233–1234. Still in that year (1228), Denis was dismissed from his position and replaced by Mojs, a confidant of Duke Béla.

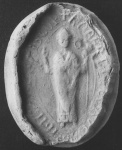
Seal of Archbishop Robert

Three years later, Denis was restored to his position in 1231, which indicated that by conducting possession inspections the king intended to return to his old policy. Around that time, Archbishop Robert made a complaint about Andrew to the Roman Curia, because the king continued to employ Jews and Muslims despite his former conflict with the Holy See over the issue. Pope Gregory IX authorized the archbishop to perform acts of religious censure to persuade Andrew to dismiss his non-Christian officials. Under duress, Andrew issued a new Golden Bull in 1231, which confirmed that Muslims were banned from employment, and empowered the Archbishop of Esztergom to excommunicate the king if he failed to honor the provisions of the new Golden Bull. The document also determined the jurisdiction of the dignity of palatine: "[...] And the palatine should judge all men without distinction, except ecclesiastical persons and clergy, as well as matrimonial and religious matters and other ecclesiastical [related] matters, which at any address appear to be subject to ecclesiastical investigation." Historian Tibor Szőcs considers the emphasis on this was perhaps a kind of "lex Dionisii" because of Denis' previous conflicts with the church administration. During his second term as palatine, Denis usually judged over lawsuits in Transdanubia, for instance Nyitra, Pest, Sopron, Moson and Zala counties. Altogether five palatinal charters issued by Denis were preserved from the time of his two terms (there are four other diplomas issued in 1234 and 1235, but it cannot be decided whether they can be linked to the activity of Denis or his successor of the same forename).

Although Andrew pledged to respect the privileges of the clergymen and to dismiss his non-Christian officials in his Golden Bull, he never fulfilled the latter promise. Therefore, Archbishop Robert excommunicated Palatine Denis and other royal advisors (e.g. Master of the treasury Nicholas – a confidant of Denis – and a certain chamberlain Samuel of "Saracen" origin) and put Hungary under an interdict on 25 February 1232, because the employment of Jews and Muslims continued despite the Golden Bull of 1231. According to Robert, Denis "wickedly advocated and defended Saracens and false Christians", while himself committed crimes against the church too. Since the archbishop accused the Muslims of persuading Andrew to seize church property, Andrew restored properties to the archbishop. Berend says Robert bemoaned the situation of the Catholic Church in the realm, as several clergymen lost their offices due to the presence of non-Christian financial experts. Denis was a member of that three-member diplomatic delegation – together with Simon Nagymartoni and Rembald de Voczon – to the Holy See, which the king sent for a peaceful reconciliation and to complain Robert's activity. Pope Gregory sought an agreement and persuaded Robert to suspend the interdict. Upon Andrew's demand, he sent Cardinal Giacomo di Pecorari as his legate to Hungary and promised that nobody would be excommunicated without the pope's special authorization. On 20 August 1233, in the forests of Bereg, Andrew II vowed in the presence of Giacomo di Pecorari and Bartholomew of Veszprém that he would not employ Jews and Muslims to administrate royal revenues, and would pay 10,000 marks as compensation for usurped Church revenues. The papal legate expressly required that Denis also swear at the agreement in the forest of Bereg.

== Dismissal and death ==
When the father of this King Béla, King Andrew of blessed memory, paid his debt to death, the king [Béla IV] went immediately to the city of Székesfehérvár with the princes and nobles of the realm, and once the archbishop of Esztergom [Robert] had crowned him with the royal crown – as is the custom – he exiled some of those barons who had stood against him on his father's side; others, whom he could, he put in jail. One of the major dignitaries, Palatine Denis, was deprived of his eyes.

— Master Roger's Epistle to the Sorrowful Lament upon the Destruction of the Kingdom of Hungary by the Tatars

King Béla IV, who ordered Denis to be blinded after his ascension to the Hungarian throne in 1235 (miniature from the Illuminated Chronicle

Duke Béla had practically taken control of the country before the death of his ailing father. Sometime at the turn of 1234 and 1235, Denis was succeeded as Palatine of Hungary by Denis Tomaj, a supporter of the duke. Andrew II died on 21 September 1235. Béla, who succeeded his father without opposition, was crowned king by Archbishop Robert in Székesfehérvár on 14 October. Immediately after his coronation, Béla IV dismissed and punished many of his late father's closest advisors. For instance, he had Denis blinded and Julius Kán imprisoned, according to the contemporaneous Roger of Torre Maggiore's Carmen Miserabile. According to a charter of Béla IV, Denis was convicted for "spoiling the realm and disloyalty". His successor, Denis Tomaj claimed his predecessor proved to be an "unjust judge", which resulted his conviction. Denis was also accused by Béla IV and his brother Duke Coloman of having, in King Andrew's life, an adulterous liaison with Queen Beatrix, the king's young widow. Béla ordered her imprisonment, but she managed to escape to the Holy Roman Empire, where she gave birth to a posthumous son, Stephen in 1236. Béla and Coloman considered her son a bastard, conceived from an adulterous relationship between Palatine Denis and Queen Beatrix. Stephen was father of Andrew III, the last monarch of the Árpád dynasty. The blinded Denis died in prison custody in 1236. Béla IV donated Denis' formerly confiscated estate Borica in Syrmia to the Cistercian friars of Bélakút Abbey (near present-day Petrovaradin, Serbia) in June 1237.

Despite that, historian Mór Wertner considered Denis to have survived his punishment and escorted his "relative" Violant (Andrew's youngest daughter) to the Kingdom of Aragon in 1235, where she became the queen consort of King James I of Aragon. According to Wertner, Denis fought in the siege of Valencia during the Reconquista, and was progenitor of the influential Dionisii noble family in Aragon. However, this count Denis was alive even in 1268, which makes it impossible to identify him with Denis, son of Ampud. Therefore, historian Szabolcs de Vajay claimed Denis had a namesake son, who served as ispán of Szepes County like his father. Accordingly, he expatriated to Aragon with his queen in 1235, after his father became a victim of King Béla's political purges. This "Comes Dionysius" was referred to as Queen Violant's relative (Latin: affinis domne regine) in contemporary Aragonese documents. He led an advance force during the siege of Valencia in 1238. He was granted landholdings by James I in the city. He died sometime between 1268 and 1272. He was ancestor of the Dionisii family, which became extinct in 1974. In his 2018 study, historian Dániel Bácsatyai disputed the above identification. A certain cleric Charles, who attended the University of Bologna, was referred to as a nephew of Cardinal Stephen Báncsa in 1264, then a son of "Count Denis of Hungary" in 1269. Consequently, Bácsatyai considered this Denis belonged to the gens (clan) Báncsa and was not related to Denis, son of Ampud. He argued the inscription in the tombstone of his daughter Elizabeth, where Denis was styled as "comes de Cepeз" is not necessarily identifiable with Szepes County.

== Sources ==
=== Primary sources ===
- Master Roger's Epistle to the Sorrowful Lament upon the Destruction of the Kingdom of Hungary by the Tatars (Translated and Annotated by János M. Bak and Martyn Rady) (2010). In: Rady, Martyn; Veszprémy, László; Bak, János M. (2010); Anonymus and Master Roger; CEU Press; ISBN 978-9639776951.

=== Secondary sources ===
- Bácsatyai, Dániel (2018). "Személyi összeköttetések a Curia Romana és a magyar egyház között a 13. század közepén. Pármai Albert és Báncsa István [Personal Relations between the Curia Romana and the Hungarian Church in the mid-13th Century. Albert of Parma and István Báncsa]". Történelmi Szemle (in Hungarian). 60 (2). Hungarian Academy of Sciences: 299–323. ISSN 0040-9634.
- Berend, Nora (2006). At the Gate of Christendom: Jews, Muslims and "Pagans" in Medieval Hungary, c. 1000-c.1300. Cambridge University Press. ISBN 978-0-521-02720-5.
- Borosy, András (1996). "A keresztes háborúk és Magyarország, II. rész [The Crusades and the Hungarian Kingdom, Part II]". Hadtörténelmi Közlemények (in Hungarian). 109 (2): 11–54. ISSN 0017-6540.
- Keglevich, Kristóf (2007). "A szepesi apátság története az Árpád- és az Anjou-korban, 1223–1387 [History of the Szepes Abbey in the Árpádian and Anjou Ages, 1223–1387]". Fons. 14 (1). Szentpétery Imre Történettudományi Alapítvány: 3–58. ISSN 1217-8020.
- Markó, László (2006). A magyar állam főméltóságai Szent Istvántól napjainkig: Életrajzi Lexikon [Great Officers of State in Hungary from King Saint Stephen to Our Days: A Biographical Encyclopedia] (in Hungarian). Helikon Kiadó. ISBN 963-208-970-7.
- Szőcs, Tibor (2010). "A nádori oklevéladás kezdeti szakasza [The Initial Stage of the Palatinal Diploma]". In Almási, Tibor; Révész, Éva; Szabados, György (eds.). "Fons, skepsis, lex": Ünnepi tanulmányok a 70 esztendős Makk Ferenc tiszteletére (in Hungarian). Szegedi Középkorász Műhely. pp. 429–437. ISBN 978-963-30-6073-5.
- Szőcs, Tibor (2014). A nádori intézmény korai története, 1000–1342 [An Early History of the Palatinal Institution: 1000–1342] (in Hungarian). Magyar Tudományos Akadémia Támogatott Kutatások Irodája. ISBN 978-963-508-697-9.
- Vajay, Szabolcs (2009). "Dominae reginae milites. Árpád-házi Jolánta magyarjai Valencia visszavétele idején [Dominae reginae milites. The Hungarians of Violant of Hungary at the Time of the Recapture of Valencia]". In Tóth, Csaba; Sarobe, Ramon (eds.). Királylányok messzi földről. Magyarország és Katalónia a középkorban (in Hungarian). Hungarian National Museum. pp. 243–263. ISBN 978-963-706-164-6.
- Weisz, Boglárka (2003). "Ampod fia Dénes [Denis, son of Ampud]". In Szentpéteri, József (ed.). Szürke eminenciások a magyar történelemben (in Hungarian). Kossuth Kiadó. pp. 14–15. ISBN 963-09-4499-5.
- Wertner, Mór (1895). "Ompud nádor és utódai [Palatine Ampud and his Descendants]". Turul (in Hungarian). 13 (2): 91–93. ISSN 1216-7258.
- Zsoldos, Attila (2011). Magyarország világi archontológiája, 1000–1301 [Secular Archontology of Hungary, 1000–1301] (in Hungarian). História, MTA Történettudományi Intézete. ISBN 978-963-9627-38-3.
- Zsoldos, Attila (2022). Az Aranybulla királya [The King of the Golden Bull] (in Hungarian). Városi Levéltár és Kutatóintézet. ISBN 978-963-8406-26-2.

Political offices
| Preceded by Solomon Atyusz | Master of the treasury 1216–1224 | Succeeded by Denis Tomaj |
| Preceded by Nicholas Szák | Palatine of Hungary; 1227–1228 | Succeeded by Mojs |
| Preceded by Mojs | Palatine of Hungary; 1231–1234 | Succeeded by Denis Tomaj |
