= Michael, son of Ampud =

Ban of Slavonia
- Reign: 1224
- Predecessor: Solomon Atyusz
- Successor: Martin Ják
- Died: after 1234
- Father: Ampud II
- Mother: N von Andechs

Michael, son of Ampud (Hungarian: Ampod fia Mihály; died after 1234) was a baron in the Kingdom of Hungary in the first decades of the 13th century, who served as Ban of Slavonia in 1224.

== Family ==
Michael was born into an influential noble family, which possessed landholdings in Slavonia beyond the river Drava. His paternal grandfather was Ampud I, a skilled military commander, who served as Ban of Slavonia and Palatine of Hungary during the reigns of kings Stephen III and Béla III. Michael was one of the three sons of Ampud II, who served as ispán of Szolnok County in 1199, and an unidentified daughter of Count Berthold III of Andechs, Margrave of Istria. Through the maternal lineage, Michael was the first cousin of Gertrude of Merania, a daughter of Berthold IV and spouse of King Andrew II. Michael had two brothers. His elder brother Denis was one of the most staunchest confidants of Andrew since the 1210s, and a key figure of the royal economic reform. Lawrence, who held ispánates in Zagreb County, Slavonia around the same period, in the service of Duke Coloman. Michael had no known wives nor descendants.

== Career ==
Despite his kinship was considered faithful partisans of Andrew II, Michael entered the service of the king's son Duke Béla, who had long opposed his father's economy policy and functioned as a trump card for Andrew's internal opposition throughout his reign. They forced Andrew II to share his realms with his heir, who was made Duke of Slavonia in 1220. Michael served as Ban of Slavonia in 1224, appearing as a witness in this capacity in a single charter issued by Duke Béla, who granted nobility to some residents of Boba in Vas County. Michael was replaced as ban by Martin Ják still at the end of the same year. Michael was referred to as ispán of Somogy County in 1225, which territory also belonged to Béla's duchy.

King Andrew transferred Béla from Slavonia to Transylvania in 1226, and Michael also accompanied him to the province in the easternmost part of the Kingdom of Hungary. He served as Master of the cupbearers in the ducal court from 1229 to 1231. Michael left Béla's allegiance and swore loyalty to Andrew II sometime between 1231 and 1233 (his brother Denis held the dignity of palatine, the highest court position during that time). He was made ispán of Fejér County in Central Hungary, serving in this capacity from 1233 to 1234. He made a wrong decision by switching, because Duke Béla had practically taken control of the country before the death of his ailing father in late 1234 or early 1325, when Denis was also deprived from his office. Michael was replaced as ispán by Béla's confidant Lawrence too. Andrew II died in September 1235. Immediately after his coronation, Béla IV dismissed and punished many of his late father's closest advisors, Denis was blinded and imprisoned. Michael disappears from the sources after 1234, but he also became disgraced and perhaps shared his brother's fate. Béla IV – who called his former confidant as "disloyal" in the document – donated Michael's formerly confiscated estate Bata in Syrmia to the Cistercian friars of the newly established Bélakút Abbey (near present-day Petrovaradin, Serbia) in June 1237.

== Sources ==
- Markó, László (2006). A magyar állam főméltóságai Szent Istvántól napjainkig: Életrajzi Lexikon [Great Officers of State in Hungary from King Saint Stephen to Our Days: A Biographical Encyclopedia] (in Hungarian). Helikon Kiadó. ISBN 963-208-970-7.
- Wertner, Mór (1895). "Ompud nádor és utódai [Palatine Ampud and his Descendants]". Turul (in Hungarian). 13 (2): 91–93. ISSN 1216-7258.
- Zsoldos, Attila (2011). Magyarország világi archontológiája, 1000–1301 [Secular Archontology of Hungary, 1000–1301] (in Hungarian). História, MTA Történettudományi Intézete. ISBN 978-963-9627-38-3.
- Zsoldos, Attila (2016). "Béla erdélyi herceg bárói [The Barons of Béla, Duke of Transylvania]". In Dáné, Veronika; Lupescu-Makó, Mária; Sipos, Gábor (eds.). Testimonio litterarum. Tanulmányok Jakó Zsigmond tiszteletére (in Hungarian). Erdélyi Múzeum Egyesület. pp. 441–449. ISBN 978-606-739-054-4.

Political offices
Preceded by Solomon Atyusz	Ban of Slavonia; 1224	Succeeded by Martin Ják
