= Ampud II =

Ampud (II)

Ispán of Szolnok
- Reign: 1199
- Predecessor: Peter, son of Töre
- Successor: Tiburtius Rosd
- Died: after 1199
- Spouse: N von Andechs
- Issue: Denis; Michael; Lawrence
- Father: Ampud I

Ampud, also Ampod (Latin: Ampudinus; died after 1199) was a baron in the Kingdom of Hungary in the late 12th century, who served as ispán of Szolnok County in 1199.

== Career ==
Ampud was born into an influential noble family, which possessed landholdings in Slavonia along the Drava river. His namesake father was Ampud, an illustrious military leader in the 1160–1170s. Ampud II served as ispán of Szolnok County in 1199, during the reign of Emeric, King of Hungary. He succeeded Peter, son of Töre in this position. Ampud was replaced as ispán by Tiburtius Rosd still in that year.

It is plausible Ampud and his wife belonged to the accompaniment of Duke Andrew in Croatia and Dalmatia, who ruled the province beyond the river Drava as a de facto sovereign monarch and constantly rebelled against his elder brother King Emeric throughout the latter's reign. Ampud either died or lost influence, after the monarch defeated Andrew's army near Lake Balaton in the summer of 1199.

== Family ==
Ampud married an unidentified daughter of Count Berthold III of Andechs, Margrave of Istria sometime before 1186. There is only one source for their marriage: Count Berthold wrote a letter to Rupert von Neuburg-Falkenstein, the abbot of Tegernsee at an unknown time that "send one of his horses to his daughter, who has already been married with the son of dux Ompudinus [Ampud I], and on occasion he will pay for it". As Rupert died in 1186, the exchange of letters certainly took place before this year. With this marriage, Ampud has gained an illustrious kinship. Duke Andrew's wife, Gertrude of Merania was the niece of Ampud's unidentified spouse.

Ampud and his wife had three sons. The eldest one Denis was one of the most important courtiers of Andrew II of Hungary and was the developer of his economic policy in the 1210–1220s. Michael belonged to the rival baronial group centered around Duke Béla in the 1220s, while Lawrence, who held ispánates in Zagreb County, Slavonia around the same period, in the service of Duke Coloman.

== Sources ==
- Wertner, Mór (1895). "Ompud nádor és utódai [Palatine Ampud and his Descendants]". Turul (in Hungarian). 13 (2): 91–93. ISSN 1216-7258.
- Zsoldos, Attila (2011). Magyarország világi archontológiája, 1000–1301 [Secular Archontology of Hungary, 1000–1301] (in Hungarian). História, MTA Történettudományi Intézete. ISBN 978-963-9627-38-3.

Political offices
Preceded by Peter, son of Töre	Ispán of Szolnok; 1199	Succeeded by Tiburtius Rosd
