= Tiburtius Rosd =

Hungarian nobleman

Tiburtius (I) Rosd

Count of the Queen's Court
- Reign: 1206
- Predecessor: Egidius Smaragd (?)
- Successor: Peter, son of Töre
- Died: after 1222
- Noble family: gens Rosd
- Issue: Farkas I

Tiburtius (I) from the kindred Rosd (also known as Tiburtius the Great; Hungarian: Rosd nembeli (I.) "Nagy" Tiborc; died after 1222) was a Hungarian distinguished nobleman at the turn of the 12th and 13th centuries, who served as ispán (head) of various counties during the reign of kings Emeric then Andrew II.

== Family ==
His origin is uncertain; according to historian György Györffy, he presumably was born into either gens (clan) Rosd or Kartal but none can be substantiated by sources. László Makkai considered Tiburtius belonged to the clan Kartal. Based on the landholdings of Tiburtius and his descendants, historian Attila Zsoldos argued Tiburtius was a member of that branch of the clan Rosd, which gradually separated from the senior branch with relatively insignificant fortune in the last decades of the 12th century, possibly due to the political advance of Tiburtius.

Tiburtius had a son Farkas I. Tiburtius' descendants (grandsons Tiburtius II and Martin and great-grandsons Farkas II, Tiburtius III and Peter) were considered supporters of King Béla IV of Hungary, who donated several landholdings to the family in various counties in the subsequent decades. The last known member of the family was the great-great grandson Thomas, who last appeared in contemporary records in 1299.

== Career ==
Tiburtius was a confidant of King Emeric, whose whole reign was characterized by his struggles for the supreme power against his rebellious younger brother, Duke Andrew. His name first appears in contemporary records in 1198, when he served as ispán of Fejér County in 1198. He was appointed as ispán of Szolnok County in 1199, succeeding Ampud. He was styled as ispán of Bodrog County in the period from 1201 to 1204. Tiburtius founded a Benedictine monastery in Rosd Island (present-day called Szentendre Island) sometime between 1198 and 1205, dedicated to the Holy Saviour (Latin: S. Salvator de Insula Rosd). Subsequently, the monastery (and later the emerging village) was called Szigetmonostor, Rosdmonostor or Tiborcmonostor (lit. "Tiburtius' monastery"). Its existence is first mentioned by a contemporary document in 1217, but it may have ceased to exist before the 14th century.

Initially, Tiburtius and his family possessed landholdings in the namesake Rosd Island and the surrounding area on the other side of the river Danube in Pilis County, for instance Pomáz and Szencse. Due to his service, Tiburtius was granted Vöröskő lordship and the surrounding villages in Pozsony County by King Emeric, according to a 1245 royal charter, which styled him as Tiburtius the Great. It is plausible that Tiburtius or one of his descendants (son Farkas or grandson Tiburtius II) built a fort there (present-day Červený Kameň Castle in Slovakia).

After Andrew II ascended the Hungarian throne in 1205, Tiburtius temporarily lost political influence. The new monarch intended to reconcile the courtiers of his late brother, which allowed Tiburtius to return to the elite, although initially he received only nominal positions. He was referred to as judge (head) of the queenly court of Gertrude of Merania in 1206, while also functioned as ispán of Fejér County from 1206 to 1207. He was replaced as judge by Peter, son of Töre in 1207. Tiburtius was mentioned as ispán of Nyitra County in 1211. In this capacity, he participated in the military campaign against the Principality of Halych in September 1211. He held the position of ispán of Moson County in 1213 and Újvár County in 1215. Subsequently, he belonged to the internal opposition of King Andrew's rule. When their movement forced the monarch to ratify the Golden Bull of 1222, Tiburtius was installed as ispán of Pozsony County, where his major estates laid, but soon he was dismissed still in that year, when Andrew II regained his power.

== Sources ==
- Engel, Pál (1996). Magyarország világi archontológiája, 1301–1457, I. [Secular Archontology of Hungary, 1301–1457, Volume I] (in Hungarian). História, MTA Történettudományi Intézete. ISBN 963-8312-44-0.
- F. Romhányi, Beatrix (2000). Kolostorok és társaskáptalanok a középkori Magyarországon: Katalógus [Monasteries and Collegiate Chapters in Medieval Hungary: A Catalogue] (in Hungarian). Pytheas. ISBN 963-7483-07-1.
- Font, Márta; Barabás, Gábor (2019). Coloman, King of Galicia and Duke of Slavonia (1208–1241): Medieval Central Europe and Hungarian Power. Amsterdam University Press. ISBN 978-164-1890-24-3.
- Zsoldos, Attila (2001). "Pest megye az Árpád-korban [Pest County in the Age of Árpáds]". In Zsoldos, Attila (ed.). Pest megye monográfiája I/2. A honfoglalástól 1686-ig (in Hungarian). Pest Megye Monográfia Közalapítvány. pp. 31–73. ISBN 963-00-8289-6.
- Zsoldos, Attila (2011). Magyarország világi archontológiája, 1000–1301 [Secular Archontology of Hungary, 1000–1301] (in Hungarian). História, MTA Történettudományi Intézete. ISBN 978-963-9627-38-3.

Tiburtius Genus Rosd Born: ? Died: after 1222
Political offices
Preceded by Thomas (?)	Ispán of Fejér; 1198	Succeeded by Atyusz Atyusz
Preceded by Ampud	Ispán of Szolnok; 1199	Succeeded by Martin Hont-Pázmány
Preceded by Theodore Csanád	Ispán of Bodrog; 1201–1204	Succeeded by Benedict
Preceded by Egidius Smaragd (?)	Count of the Queen's Court; 1206	Succeeded by Peter
Preceded by Atyusz Atyusz	Ispán of Fejér; 1206–1207	Succeeded by Farkas
Preceded by Marcellus Tétény	Ispán of Nyitra; 1211	Succeeded by Julius Rátót
Preceded by Pat Győr	Ispán of Moson; 1213	Succeeded by Pat Győr
Preceded by Alexander Hont-Pázmány	Ispán of Újvár; 1215	Succeeded by Denis
Preceded by Smaragd	Ispán of Pozsony; 1222	Succeeded by Buzád Hahót
