= Peter, son of Töre =

Hungarian lord

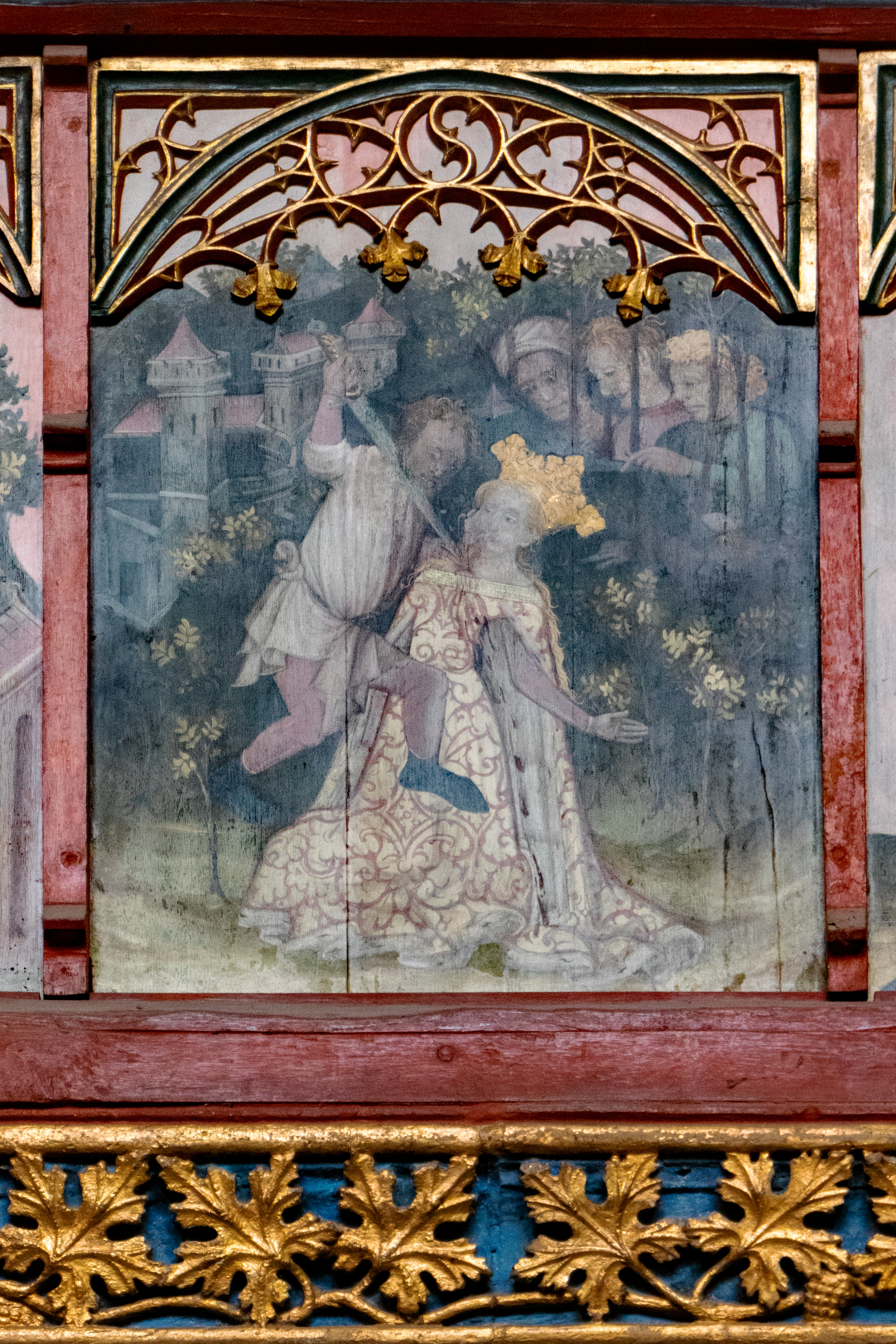
- Peter kills Queen Gertrude, depicted the 9th painting of Life of St. Elisabeth of Hungary cycle in Heiligen-Geist-Hospital, Lübeck (15th century)

Judge royal
- Reign: 1198
- Predecessor: Esau
- Successor: Mika Ják
- Died: 1213
- Father: Töre (Turoy)

Peter, son of Töre (Hungarian: Töre fia Péter; executed in 1213) was a Hungarian lord who served as judge royal in 1198 during the reign of King Emeric.

He is known for leading a group of Hungarian magnates responsible for the assassination of Gertrude of Merania on 28 September 1213.

== Career ==
Peter was the son of Töre (also Turoy, Turwey, or Toraj). According to non-authentic charters, he served as ispán of Pozsony County from 1193 to 1195 during the late reign of King Béla III. He was mentioned as ispán of Bihar County in 1197. King Emeric appointed him Judge royal the following year, replacing Esau. Beside that, he also functioned as ispán of Szolnok County. By 1199, he had lost both dignities, replaced by Mika Ják and Ampud (son of Palatine Ampud) respectively.

His lands were located in Syrmia and south of Bács County. The centre of his estates was Pétervárad – today Petrovaradin, part of the agglomeration of Novi Sad, Serbia – which was named after him. In 1201, he held the position of ispán of Sopron County.

Until 1207, Peter disappeared from contemporary sources. It is presumably that he supported the rebellious against King Emeric, making him unable to hold any political offices in the royal court. After Andrew's accession to the throne in 1205, Peter was part of the Queen's royal household. Between 1207 and 1210, he served as Queen Gertrude's judge royal (Latin: curialis comes regine) until he was replaced by Bánk Bár-Kalán in that position. He also served as ispán of Szolnok County for the second time (1207) and ispán of Csanád County from 1207 until his death. Finally, he held the office of ispán of Bács County between 1210 and 1212. In 1211, Peter participated in the royal campaign against the Principality of Galicia.

== Assassination of Queen Gertrude ==
When Andrew II left Hungary for a new campaign against Galicia, a group of Hungarian lords, taking advantage of the King's absence, captured and murdered Queen Gertrude and many of her courtiers in the Pilis Hills on 28 September 1213. Gertrude's body was torn to pieces, while her brother Berthold, the Archbishop of Kalocsa, and Leopold VI, Duke of Austria narrowly escaped. Gertrude was buried in the Pilis Abbey. According to contemporary reports, Peter personally killed the Queen, while Palatine Bánk Bár-Kalán, the Kacsics brothers (Simon and Michael), and other lords were also implicated in the conspiracy.

The motivation behind the assassination is uncertain. Later tradition holds that Queen Gertrude's brother (Berthold) raped Bánk's wife, and Bánk killed the Queen because he felt she had encouraged her brother. This version appeared in the Chronicon rhythmicum Austriacum around 1270, and was repeated by 14th-century Hungarian chronicles (Chronica Hungarorum, Annales Posonienses etc.). The linguist János Horváth formerly argued that the chroniclers in fact referred to the coeval Felician Záh's assassination attempt (1330) against Charles I of Hungary when describing Gertrude's death. József Katona's Bánk bán (which was set to music by Ferenc Erkel), where Peter appears as Ban Petúr, also preserved and spread this version. Further records from the 15th century, based on De fundatoribus monasterii Diessensis, suggest Gertrude was innocently murdered because she had not known of Berthold's intention and crime.

A more likely motive is that the Hungarian lords led by Peter, resentful of Queen Gertrude's favoritism towards her German entourage, feared losing their court positions and influence. Gertrude's two brothers, Ekbert, Bishop of Bamberg, and Henry II, Margrave of Istria, had fled to Hungary in 1208 after being accused of participating in the murder of Philip, King of the Germans. Berthold of Kalocsa (since 1206) was also appointed Ban of Slavonia in 1209 and later Voivode of Transylvania in 1212 by the dismissals of Bánk Bár-Kalán and Michael Kacsics respectively. Andrew's generosity towards his wife's German relatives and courtiers clearly displeased the Hungarian lords. The unidentified author of the Gesta Hungarorum also referenced Germans from the Holy Roman Empire when he included a sarcastic remark that "now ... the Romans gaze on the goods of Hungary." Some sources also cite John, Archbishop of Esztergom's famous letter (Reginam occidere). Historian Tamás Körmendi suggested Peter had a personal motive behind the murder.

== Execution ==
When Andrew II heard the news of his wife's murder, he interrupted the campaign in Galicia and returned home. He ordered the execution of Peter, son of Töre, who was impaled in the autumn of 1213, and his lands were confiscated. According to the continuation of Magnus von Reichersberg's chronicle, Peter was executed along with his wife and entire family. However, Peter's accomplices, including Palatine Bánk, did not receive severe punishments, likely due to the political situation and Andrew's unstable power. Bánk retained influential positions even after the assassination.

Only Duke Béla, son of Andrew and Gertrude, sought retribution after being appointed Duke of Transylvania and beginning to revise his father's policy. In 1228, he confiscated the estates of Bánk and the Kacsics brothers, whom he accused of plotting against his mother. Tamás Körmendi suggested they were victims of political intrigue and purge, accused of conspiracy for purely political reasons. According to a royal charter issued in 1237, Béla IV, now as king, donated Peter's former lands to the newly founded Cistercian Bélakút Abbey, which belonged to the Archdiocese of Kalocsa.

== Sources ==
- Engel, Pál (2001). The Realm of St Stephen: A History of Medieval Hungary, 895-1526. I.B. Tauris Publishers. ISBN 1-86064-061-3.
- (in Hungarian) Körmendi, Tamás (2009a): A Gertrúd királyné elleni merénylet a magyar gestaszerkesztményben ("The Murderous Attack against Queen Gertrudis according to the Hungarian Gestas"). In: Körmendi, Tamás – Thoroczkay, Gábor (ed.): Auxilium historiae. Tanulmányok a hetvenesztendős Bertényi Iván tiszteletére, Eötvös Loránd University, Budapest. pp. 195–205.
- (in Hungarian) Körmendi, Tamás (2009b): A Gertrúd királyné elleni merénylet a külhoni elbeszélő forrásokban ("The Murderous Attack against Queen Gertrudis according to the Foreign Narrative Sources"). Történelmi Szemle Vol. 51. pp. 155–193.
- (in Hungarian) Körmendi, Tamás (2014): A Gertrúd királyné elleni merénylet körülményei ("The Circumstances of the Murder of Queen Gertrude"). In: Majorossy, Judit (ed.): Egy történelmi gyilkosság margójára. Merániai Gertrúd emlékezete, 1213–2013, Ferenczy Museum, Szentendre. pp. 95–124.
- (in Hungarian) Markó, László (2006): A magyar állam főméltóságai Szent Istvántól napjainkig – Életrajzi Lexikon ("The High Officers of the Hungarian State from Saint Stephen to the Present Days – A Biographical Encyclopedia") (2nd edition); Helikon Kiadó Kft., Budapest. ISBN 963-547-085-1.
- (in Hungarian) Zsoldos, Attila (2011). Magyarország világi archontológiája, 1000–1301 ("Secular Archontology of Hungary, 1000–1301"). História, MTA Történettudományi Intézete. Budapest. ISBN 978-963-9627-38-3

Political offices
Preceded by Esau	Judge royal 1198	Succeeded by Mika Ják
Preceded by Tiburtius Rosd	Count of the Queen's Court; 1207–1210	Succeeded by Bánk Bár-Kalán
