= Mojs I =

Palatine of Hungary from 1228 to 1231

Mojs (I)

Palatine of Hungary
- Reign: 1228–1231
- Predecessor: Denis, son of Ampud
- Successor: Denis, son of Ampud
- Died: after 1233
- Noble family: Dárói kinship
- Spouse: Venys Monoszló
- Issue: Alexander; Mojs II a daughter

Mojs, also Moys or Majos (died after 1233) was a Hungarian noble, who served as Palatine of Hungary between 1228 and 1231, during the reign of Andrew II.

== Career ==
His father and family background is unknown. Mojs owned landholdings mostly in Somogy and Tolna counties in addition to estates along the river Drava. He had a brother Nicholas, who functioned as ispán of Vas County either in 1208 and 1213, and also appeared in diplomas as "Nicholas de Dáró", thus he was ancestor of the Dárói noble family. Mojs I married Venys from the kindred Monoszló, a daughter of Macarius II Monoszló. They had three children: Alexander, the Bearer of the sword in 1233; Mojs II, who had held several important dignities since the 1250s and an unidentified daughter, who married Nana Bár-Kalán, the son of Pousa Bár-Kalán. Through Alexander, Mojs I was also a forefather of the Gereci and Hábi families.

Mojs was first mentioned by contemporary sources, when he served as ispán of Vas County in 1209, presumably replacing his brother in that position. He participated in the Fifth Crusade under the command of Andrew II between 1217 and 1218. Mojs belonged to the entourage of Duke Béla, who had long opposed his father's "useless and superfluous perpetual grants". Such, as a member of the internal opposition, Mojs did not hold any royal dignities for the upcoming two decades, after 1209. In 1228, Duke Béla, who gained prominence due to the advancing support of the lords, was able to overshadow King Andrew's most faithful confidant Denis, son of Ampud, who lost his influence and replaced by Mojs as Palatine. Beside that he also governed Bihar County between 1229 and 1231. As none of his charters preserved, there is no record of any judgments and other activity, while Mojs held the dignity. Around May 1231, Denis regained the confidence of the King and was appointed Palatine again, succeeding Mojs, who, according to a non-authentic charter, still held the office in 1232, mistakenly.

He was present among the King's companion in the forests of Bereg on 20 August 1233, where Andrew II vowed that he would not employ Jews and Muslims to administrate royal revenues, and would pay 10,000 marks as compensation for usurped Church revenues. A false diploma issued in October 1244 suggests that Mojs served as Judge royal in that year. It is presumable that Mojs died before 1235, when his patron Béla IV ascended the Hungarian throne.

== Sources ==
- Markó, László (2006). A magyar állam főméltóságai Szent Istvántól napjainkig: Életrajzi Lexikon [Great Officers of State in Hungary from King Saint Stephen to Our Days: A Biographical Encyclopedia] (in Hungarian). Helikon Kiadó. ISBN 963-208-970-7.
- Szőcs, Tibor (2014). A nádori intézmény korai története, 1000–1342 [An Early History of the Palatinal Institution: 1000–1342] (in Hungarian). Magyar Tudományos Akadémia Támogatott Kutatások Irodája. ISBN 978-963-508-697-9.
- Zsoldos, Attila (2011). Magyarország világi archontológiája, 1000–1301 [Secular Archontology of Hungary, 1000–1301] (in Hungarian). História, MTA Történettudományi Intézete. ISBN 978-963-9627-38-3.
- Zsoldos, Attila (2020). "Az Árpád-kor hatalmi elitje [The Power Elite of the Árpádian Era]". In Csukovits, Enikő (ed.). Az Anjou-kor hatalmi elitje (in Hungarian). MTA Bölcsészettudományi Kutatóközpont. pp. 73–92. ISBN 978-963-416-212-4.

Political offices
Preceded by Denis, son of Ampud	Palatine of Hungary; 1228–1231	Succeeded by Denis, son of Ampud
