= Andrew of Hungary, Prince of Galicia =

Árpád ruler (c. 1210–1234)

Andrew

Prince of Galicia
- Reign: 1227–1230; 1231–1234
- Predecessor: Mstislav Mstislavich; Danylo Romanovych
- Successor: Danylo Romanovych
- Born: c. 1210
- Died: January 1234; Halych, Principality of Galicia
- Spouse: Elena (Maria) Mstislavna
- Dynasty: Árpád
- Father: Andrew II of Hungary
- Mother: Gertrude of Merania

Andrew of Hungary (Hungarian: András, Ukrainian: Андрій Андрійович; c. 1210 – January 1234) was a Hungarian prince from the House of Árpád. He was the ruling Prince of Peremyshl since 1224, and also Prince of Galicia, between 1227 and 1230, and between 1231 and 1234, centered in Halych.

== Early life ==
Andrew was the youngest (third) son of King Andrew II of Hungary and his wife, Gertrude of Merania. He was born around 1210, according to historian Gyula Kristó. Mór Wertner placed the date of his birth in the period between 1210 and 1212. He was infant, when his mother was assassinated in the autumn of 1213. His name is first mentioned by a letter of Pope Honorius III in February 1217. The infant Andrew's nanny was Alice of French origin, a lady-in-waiting of Queen Yolanda of Courtenay, his father's second spouse.

His betrothal to Isabella, a daughter of Leo I, King of Cilicia was decided by their parents during his father's return from the Holy Land in early 1218. Andrew II and Leo I intended them to become joint heirs to the Armenian (Cilician) throne. Pope Honorius confirmed their engagement in 1219. However, their betrothal was later broken in favor of a more advantageous marriage between Isabella and Philip of Antioch for her bridegroom.

Following his older brother Coloman was captured after Mstislav Mstislavich and his Cuman allies defeated the Hungarians near Halych in August 1221, Andrew II entered into negotiations with Mstislav and they reached a compromise in late 1221 or early 1222. The Hungarian king renounced Halych and arranged a marriage alliance between his youngest son, Andrew, and Mstislav's daughter Elena (also known as Maria) in order to secure Coloman's release. Coloman also had to abandon all claim on Halych in favor of the approximately eleven-year-old Andrew. Their father tried to obtain a papal exemption from these conditions and asked for the transfer of the royal title of Coloman to Andrew, but Pope Honorius refused the request.

== Prince of Galicia ==
After 1222, Andrew disappears from contemporary records in Hungary. His subsequent role in Halych as puppet ruler of his father is narrated only by the Galician–Volhynian Chronicle. Therefore, some Hungarian historians questioned the narration of that Old East Slavic work, considering the young Andrew died in 1224 at the latest and his betrothal with Mstislav's daughter never took effect. Mór Wertner proved that a charter of Coloman implicitly suggests that Andrew was still alive around 1230 or 1231.

=== First reign ===
Danylo Romanovych – son-in-law of Mstislav – refused the agreement between Mstislav and the Hungarians. He sought assistance from the dukes of Poland to enforce his aspirations to the Galician throne. Following the Battle of the Kalka River (1223), Mstislav's influence and authority had declined in the southern part of Rus'. Pro-Hungarian boyars demanded a Hungarian military intervention against Mstislav. Under duress, Mstislav was forced to transfer power to prince Andrew over Przemyśl in 1224 or 1225. Andrew II launched a campaign against Mstislav Mstislavich in late 1226 because the latter refused to grant Halych to Andrew's youngest son despite their previous compromise. The Hungarians besieged and captured Przemyśl, Terebovl, and other fortresses in Halych. However, – after Danylo and Vasylko Romanovych decided to support Mstislav – his troops were routed at Kremenets and Zvenigorod, forcing him to withdraw. Despite his victories, Mstislav ceded Halych to Andrew's namesake son in early 1227, following diplomatic negotiations. A leading pro-Hungarian boyar Sudislav administered the province on behalf of the young Andrew.

Both Leszek the White and Mstislav died by 1228, leaving Danylo to face the Hungarian rule in Halych alone. Sudislav convinced Vladimir IV Rurikovich, Grand Prince of Kiev and Mikhail Vsevolodovich, Prince of Chernigov to acknowledge Andrew's rule in Galicia. His reign was supposed to prepare the incorporation of the Orthodox Church in Galicia to the Hungarian ecclesiastical organization, but no steps were taken in this direction due to political instability. By 1230, the Romanovych brothers took control over neighboring Volhynia. Consolidating his rule and foreign relations, Danylo launched a military campaign against Andrew's territory in 1230 (the Galician–Volhynian Chronicle incorrectly put the year of attack to 1229). Besieging and capturing the capital Halych, Danylo seized Galicia by March 1230. Andrew was captured and taken prisoner, but Danylo soon released him and the young prince fled to Hungary, accompanied by Sudislav.

Sometime before 1232, there was a brief skirmish between Andrew and Coloman because of their conflicting interest in Halych. After 1221, Coloman never gave up his claim over the principality and remained in the neighboring Szepesség (today Spiš, Slovakia) for years. Only a single reference in a charter of Duke Coloman from 1232 mentions their conflict in passing. The document claims that Andrew had attacked the "realm" of Coloman led by false advisers. It is unlikely that Andrew invaded Slavonia, which Coloman governed after 1226, because of the geographical distance and Andrew's constantly difficult situation in Halych. As Slovak historian Nataša Procházková considered Andrew invaded Coloman's lands in Szepesség sometime between 1222 and 1226, and only a brief skirmish occurred between them. Historian Attila Zsoldos considered the confrontation took place in the first half of 1231, after Andrew was driven from Halych (see below). Zsoldos argued the skirmish was part of wider conflict between Andrew II and his elder sons, Béla and Coloman, who strongly opposed his economic reforms and internal policy. Robert, Archbishop of Esztergom mediated the peace in the dynastic conflict.

=== Second reign ===
Only a smaller faction of the local boyars supported Danylo's realm in Halych, several conspiracies and assassination attempts took place against him within a year. The eldest brother Béla decided to help Andrew to regain his throne. He crossed the Carpathian Mountains and laid siege to Halych together with his Cuman allies led by Bortz in 1230 (or 1229, if GVC is correct), but he could not seize the town and withdrew his troops. Duke Andrew and Sudislav departed for Hungary again. In the second half of 1231, Andrew II and Béla jointly invaded Halych in order to restore his youngest son, Andrew, to the Galician throne. The Hungarian army captured the forts of Yaroslavl (present-day Jarosław, Poland) and Halych. Leader of the Hungarian army, a certain Martinis was killed during the conflict. Andrew II concluded a peace with Danylo at Volodymyr (Vladimir); the young Andrew was restored to the Galician throne.

"[As] Danilo and Vasilko [stubbornly] advanced upon Halych, most of the inhabitants of the city came out to meet them [...]. Upon his arrival, Danilo pitched camp on the [opposite] bank of the Dniester, [where] he welcomed the Galician people. He distributed towns to his boyars and voyevodas, and they all had an abundance of food, while the king's son [Andrew], Dijaniš [Denis Türje], and Sudislav were dying of hunger in [Halych]. [...] In a short while the king's son died [...]"
Galician–Volhynian Chronicle (1233–1234)

A significant number of Hungarian military force remained in Rus' to support and consolidate Andrew's instabil rule. Andrew plausibly formed an alliance with Mikhail Vsevolodovich of Chernigov in order to attack Vladimir IV Rurikovich, but the latter routed them at Beloberezhye along the river Sluch in the winter of 1232–1233, according to Ukrainian historian Mykhailo Hrushevsky. Thereafter, Vladimir Rurikovich laid siege to Halych in the spring of 1233. Andrew requested reinforcements from Hungary; a considerable army led by Denis Türje arrived to the province in the autumn of 1233. Despite the internal conflicts with the church, Andrew II also prepared to departure for Halych too but had to continue his negotiations which led to the oath of Bereg. However, the Hungarians were defeated by Vladimir Rurikovich and his Cuman allies led by Köten near Przemyśl in western Galicia. Andrew lost the support of boyars completely. Taking advantage of the situation, Danylo Romanovych seized all of Galicia, excluding the capital Halych, which remained under Hungarian control. During a nine-week siege, the defenders were starved out and skirmishes with Frederick the Quarrelsome along the Austrian border hindered Andrew II to send subsequent relief army. According to the Galician–Volhynian Chronicle, Duke Andrew starved to death at the very beginning of 1234, which closed the conflict and King Andrew II's series of attempts to seize Galicia for the Hungarian Crown.

== Grave ==
Among the mixed remains of bones found in an ossuary at the site of the Basilica of the Assumption of the Blessed Virgin Mary in Székesfehérvár in 2022, researchers at the University of Szeged, using archaeogenetic methods, used a DNA sample from King Béla III to identify the remains of his grandson Prince Andrew.

== Sources ==
=== Primary sources ===
- Perfecky, George A. (1973). The Galician-Volynian Chronicle. München: Wilhelm Fink Verlag.

=== Secondary sources ===
- Dimnik, Martin (2003). The Dynasty of Chernigov, 1146–1246. New York: Cambridge University Press.
- Érszegi, Géza; Solymosi, László (1981). "Az Árpádok királysága, 1000–1301 [The Monarchy of the Árpáds, 1000–1301]". In Solymosi, László (ed.). Magyarország történeti kronológiája, I: a kezdetektől 1526-ig [Historical Chronology of Hungary, Volume I: From the Beginning to 1526] (in Hungarian). Akadémiai Kiadó. pp. 79–187. ISBN 963-05-2661-1.
- Engel, Pál (2001). The Realm of St Stephen: A History of Medieval Hungary, 895–1526. London & New York: I.B.Tauris.
- Font, Márta (2000). "On the frontiers of West and East: The Hungarian kingdom and the Galician principality between the eleventh and thirteenth centuries" (PDF). Annual of medieval studies at Central European University. 6: 171–180. Archived from the original on 2025-02-20.
- Font, Márta (2012). "Principles and Methods in the Policy of the Hungarian King, Andreas II concerning the Galician-Volhynian Principality". Principalities in lands of Galicia and Volhynia in international relations in the 11th-14th centuries. Colloquia Russica, I/2. Krakow: Uniwersytet Jagielloński. pp. 228–235.
- Font, Márta; Barabás, Gábor (2019). Coloman, King of Galicia and Duke of Slavonia (1208–1241): Medieval Central Europe and Hungarian Power. Leeds: Arc Humanities Press.
- Font, Márta (2021). The Kings of the House of Árpád and the Rurikid Princes: Cooperation and conflict in medieval Hungary and Kievan Rus' (PDF). Budapest: Research Centre for the Humanities. Archived from the original on 2025-12-25.
- Font, Márta (2023). "The Title rex Galiciae between Ambitions and Reality (c. 1100-r. 1400)". Unions and Divisions: New Forms of Rule in Medieval and Renaissance Europe. New York: Routledge. pp. 107–118.
- Hanula, Zsolt (2020-08-09). "Azonosították Szent László király földi maradványait". telex.hu.
- Kristó, Gyula; Makk, Ferenc (1996). Az Árpád-ház uralkodói [Rulers of the House of Árpád] (in Hungarian). I.P.C. Könyvek. ISBN 963-7930-97-3.
- Van Cleve, Thomas C. (1969). "The Fifth Crusade". In Setton, Kenneth M.; Wolff, Robert Lee; Hazard, Harry (eds.). A History of the Crusades, Volume II: The Later Crusades, 1189-1311. The University of Wisconsin Press. pp. 377–428. ISBN 0-299-04844-6.
- Wertner, Mór (1892). Az Árpádok családi története [Family History of the Árpáds] (in Hungarian). Szabó Ferencz N.-eleméri plébános & Pleitz Fer. Pál Könyvnyomdája.
- Zsoldos, Attila (2022). Az Aranybulla királya [The King of the Golden Bull] (in Hungarian). Városi Levéltár és Kutatóintézet. ISBN 978-963-8406-26-2.

Andrew Árpád dynasty Born: c. 1210 Died: January 1234
Regnal titles
Preceded by Mstislav Mstislavich	Prince of Halych; 1227–1230	Succeeded by Danylo Romanovych
Preceded by Danylo Romanovych	Prince of Halych; 1231–1234	Succeeded by Danylo Romanovych
