= Oath of Bereg =

The oath of Bereg (Hungarian: beregi eskü), also labelled as agreement at Bereg (Hungarian: beregi egyezmény), was a treaty signed between the Kingdom of Hungary and the Holy See in the forests of Bereg on 20 August 1233. In the document, King Andrew II of Hungary vowed that he would not employ Jews and Muslims to administer royal revenues, which caused a decade-long discord with the Holy See starting in the early 1220s, composing of diplomatic complaints and ecclesiastical censures. The document is also an important source for the history of salt trade in Hungary.

== Background ==
Since the establishment of the Kingdom of Hungary at the turn of the 10th and 11th centuries, the Hungarians demonstrated a tolerant attitude towards Jews and Muslims (also called Böszörménys). The presence of non-Christian merchants in the kingdom was due to its role as a crossroad of trading routes leading towards Constantinople, Regensburg and Kiev. Géza II, who ruled Hungary in the mid-12th century, even employed Muslim soldiers who had been recruited from among the peoples of the Eurasian steppes. Nevertheless, the employment of non-Christian officials in administrative functions also had tradition too in Hungary: a royal charter of Coloman, King of Hungary from 1111 refer to "agents" of the royal treasury, who were of "Khalyzians" (Muslims).

Andrew II ascended the Hungarian throne in 1205, following years of struggle with his brother Emeric. He introduced a new policy for royal grants, which he called "new institutions" in one of his charters. He distributed large portions of the royal domain—royal castles and all estates attached to them—as inheritable grants to his supporters, declaring that "the best measure of a royal grant is its being immeasurable." Royal revenues decreased, which led to the introduction of new taxes and their farming out to wealthy Muslims and Jews. The new methods of raising funds for the royal treasury created widespread unrest. Andrew also employed Jews and Muslims to administer royal revenues, which caused a discord between the monarch and the Holy See starting in the early 1220s. The first known sign of this is that Pope Honorius III requested King Andrew II and Queen Yolanda of Courtenay to abandon the employment of Jews and Muslim in royal administration in April 1221. He also sought to reach to prohibit non-Christians to hold Christian slaves. The complaints of popes reflected the resolutions of the Fourth Council of the Lateran (1215) against the non-Christian subjects.

When a group of discontented lords assumed power in the spring of 1222, they forced Andrew to issue the Golden Bull of 1222, which prohibited the employment of Muslims and Jews in royal administration. Andrew continued to employ them in the subsequent years, according to a letter of Pope Honorius III to Ugrin Csák, Archbishop of Kalocsa and his subordinates in August 1225, blaming the prelate of tolerating the violation of the prohibition in the realm, and even in his own archdiocese. Pope Gregory referred to the Councils of Toledo and its confirmation by the Fourth Council of the Lateran that non-Christians were forbidden to hold public office. This ban was confirmed when Andrew II, urged by the prelates, issued the Golden Bull's new variant in 1231, which authorized the Archbishop of Esztergom to excommunicate him in case of his departure from its provisions.

== Immediate events ==
Robert, Archbishop of Esztergom made a complaint to the Roman Curia in 1231 that Andrew II continued to employ Jews and Muslims despite the aforementioned prohibitions and his former conflict with the Holy See over the issue. Pope Gregory IX instructed Robert in March 1231 to take action because, according to complaints, Christians in Hungary have suffered various harms because of Jews and Muslims. Mixing people of different religions was also seen by the pope as a source of danger, as he believed this could have increased the risk of leaving the faith. The pope also argued the disarray of the situation of non-Christians hinders the cause of the baptism of the Cumans. Even from the year 1232, the names of non-Christian officials were preserved: Samuel was of "Saracen" origin, who later converted to Roman Catholicism, and Teha (or Teka) was Jewish, both were ispáns of the royal chamber (Latin: comites camere). Their function is reflected by surviving royal coins with Hebrew letters and inscriptions.

Although Andrew II pledged to respect the privileges of the clergymen and to dismiss his non-Christian officials in his two Golden Bulls, he never fulfilled the latter promise. As a result, Archbishop Robert excommunicated Andrew's key financial advisors – Palatine Denis, son of Ampud, Master of the treasury Nicholas and the aforementioned former chamberlain Samuel of "Saracen" origin – and placed Hungary under an interdict on 25 February 1232. Robert justified his action by the role of the Ishmaelites in the royal administration, especially in minting. He also accused Samuel of heresy and of supporting Muslims and "false" Christians. He, though, refrained from excommunicating King Andrew II himself. Andrew II petitioned to the Roman Curia, complaining about the deeds of the archbishop. In response, Pope Gregory sent a letter to Archbishop Robert in July 1232, in which he accused him of exceeding his powers. The pope emphasized that Robert's jurisdiction as papal legate was limited to the area inhabited by the Cumans and ordered him not to apply further ecclesiastical punishments. The pope promised Andrew that nobody would be excommunicated without the pope's special authorization. Since the archbishop accused the Muslims of persuading Andrew to seize church property, Andrew restored properties to the archbishop, who soon suspended the interdict upon the instruction of the pope.

Pope Gregory IX, simultaneously with his letter, also sent James of Pecorara, Cardinal-Bishop of Palestrina as his papal legate to Hungary, who was entrusted to reach an agreement between King Andrew II and Archbishop Robert. The cardinal arrived to Hungary in September 1232. The king avoided meeting him in the following months, thus the cardinal was able to deal with only internal affairs of the church in Hungary. According to historian Tibor Almási, Andrew II, in possession of the papal reassurance, endeavored to hold back all progress in the negotiations to the end, and James of Pecorara could not even threaten a more severe sanction. In early 1233, James met Archbishop Robert and the Hungarian prelates. They jointly transcribed and confirmed Andrew's 1222 donations of privilege to Hungarian Church in March 1233. The cardinal also dealt with the case of the Teutonic Knights, which was expelled from Hungary in 1225. The cardinal sent his chaplain Roger of Torre Maggiore to Rome to report that Andrew II hesitates to reconcile with the Holy See and has been sabotaging the negotiations in various ways for months.

To move the negotiations out of the deadlock, Pope Gregory sent three letters to Hungary on 12 August 1233. The addressees of the two letters were the papal legate. In the first letter, Pope Gregory authorized James of Pecorara to renew, if necessary, the prohibition and excommunication of members of the royal entourage in order to enforce the king's compliance, but, in the second letter, expressly forbade the excommunication of the king himself or his sons – princes Béla, Coloman and Andrew. King Andrew received the third letter: the pope listed the "terrible" abuses that forced Archbishop Robert to proclaim ecclesiastical censures before that, and which Andrew did not even remedy in spite of the warning words of the legate. The pope assured the king that he sincerely likes his person, but as the pope must measure everyone's actions equally, the verdict that the legate will make against the "rebellious" elements, he will also be forced to approve. The extent to which the letters facilitated an agreement is questionable, as it was only eight days before the oath of Bereg was concluded. According to historian Nándor Knauz, Lajos Balics and Vilmos Fraknói, Andrew could already know the papal opinion through his ambassadors.

Although Andrew departed for Halych to support his youngest son Andrew in a fight against Daniel Romanivich, he was willing to meet the representatives of the papal legate, Bartholomew, Bishop of Veszprém and Cognoscens, a canon of Esztergom. On 20 August 1233, the two papal envoys caught up with Andrew II and his accompaniment in the forests of Bereg in the northeast corner of the Kingdom of Hungary before his departure to lead his military campaign against Halych. According to Almási, Bartholomew and Cognoscens forced Andrew to choose between immediate agreement and the imposition of ecclesiastical censure. The submitted draft assured James that the final confirmation of the agreement would take place in his presence. Two days after the meeting in the forest of Bereg, Andrew's heir and political rival, Duke Béla also arrived the scene with his entourage – for instance, Mojs and Denis Türje – and also swore oath to the agreement two days later, on 22 August 1233. The Hungarian king met personally James of Pecorara only in Esztergom in September 1233, where the economic details were agreed and the barons of the realm – including Nicholas Szák, Simon Nagymartoni, Peter Tétény, Maurice Pok, Baldwin Rátót, File Szeretvai and the formerly excommunicated treasurer Nicholas swore to the charter. In the document, the papal legate expressly required that Palatine Denis – a key reformer of economy, who was involved many conflicts with the church in the previous years – should also swear to the oath of Bereg.

== Content ==
The text of the oath of Bereg was preserved in two original charters and two transcribed copies. It was issued on 20 August 1233, and then in September 1233 it was transcribed by Andrew in a letter to the papal legate James of Pecorara, and finally by Archbishop Robert of Esztergom on 19 February 1234. It was formulated entirely according to the demands of the legate; it consisted of two main parts, one relating to non-Christians and the other to privileges, especially salt income, of the church in Hungary. Duke Béla secured his earlier promise in his diploma issued on 23 February 1234. Additionally, his oath also contained that he will act against the heretics and lead the disobedient to the obedience of the church in his domain. Pope Gregory also confirmed the oath too in his letter to Archbishop Robert in January 1234.

=== Affairs of non-Christians ===
"We no longer appoint Jews, Saracens or Ishmaelites, to the head of our chamber, mint, nor to allow them to collect our salt, revenues, and to hold any public office, and do not assign them to assist the superiors, and do not commit any fraud by which they may oppress Christians."
1.a paragraph of the Oath of Bereg (20 August 1233)

Andrew II, similarly to the provisions of the golden bulls of 1222 and 1231, swore he will not employ Jews and Muslims as officials of the royal treasury (chamber) and of the mintage, administrators of the salt mining and collectors of taxes, not even by subjecting them to Christian superiors in these royal offices. Andrew also forbade to place Jews and Saracens, or Ishmaelites, at the head of a public office.

The oath of Bereg also prescribed both non-Christian groups to be distinguished and separated from Christians by means of badges, while forbade both Jews and Saracens to buy or to hire Christian slaves. Those bishops, whose dioceses were inhabited by a significant number of Muslim or Jewish communities, were permitted to request the separation of those people from Christian settlements. The oath prohibited marriage, cohabitation and any business relationship between Christians and non-Christians. In accordance with the agreement, the palatine or other appointed royal courtier had to be sent out each year to check for a violation of the law; every transgressor, whether Jew, Muslim or Christian, will lose property and be sentenced to eternal slavery for life.

=== Privileges of the church ===
The jurisdiction of ecclesiastical judiciary regarding morning-gift (dower), dowry and marital affairs was enshrined in the agreement. Andrew emphasized he will not allow secular courts to hear these cases, "because we do not want to interfere in them and we are not competent". Andrew promised not to impair ecclesiastical privileges. The Hungarian monarch determined that ecclesiastical persons (clergymen and their subjects) could be judged only by ecclesiastical courts, except for lawsuits involving ownership of possessions and landholdings, as it has been the customary rule of the king from the beginning. The oath also guaranteed the complete tax exemption for church persons and clergy. The king also stipulated that church members were required to consult with him regarding the imposition of their own tax, after which they jointly could turn to the pope for a decision.

The agreement sought to remedy the alleged damage to the economic structure of the church, as the monarch and his secular elite were accused of unlawfully confiscating and usurping a significant proportion of the revenues of Catholic Church in Hungary. James of Pecorara endeavoured to ensure that neither the monarch nor his barons appropriated church revenues, primarily the salt mining and trade from Transylvania via the river Maros (Mureș). Andrew II promised to pay altogether 10,000 marks in five years (1234–1238) as compensation for revenues already appropriated, which were equivalent of the salt revenues that the king had withheld from the churches in Hungary. The Bishop of Csanád, the Abbot of Pannonhalma and the Abbot of Egres were entrusted to receive the sum on the due dates in the Dominican monastery at Pest. Andrew permitted that churches are free to transport their salt to their own church, where from the officials of the salt chamber were obliged to pay according to the set tariff by a specified deadline (8 September and 21 December), including shipping and storage costs. The churches were free to dispose of the salt as long as the king's officials did not exercise the right of pre-emption. The king also determined that the churches should be paid for with good quality silver Friesacher pfennigs or in silver of one-tenth quality.

According to historian Beatrix F. Romhányi, the agreement at Bereg covered only the salt transport along the river Maros, while there were other land routes, most notably the route across the Meszes Gate (today in Meseș Mountains) to Szalacs (present-day Sălacea, Romania). F. Romhányi argued the churches altogether stored salt transported from Transylvania, nearly three-quarters of which was delivered via the Szalacs route, and only slightly more than ¼ of it came from the Maros route, while there were also salt warehouses in Pressburg (today Bratislava, Slovakia) and Sopron. The following lists contains the share of the various churches from salt trade and storage via the river Maros according to the oath of Bereg and some attached charters (issued on 1 October 1233), and the share by type of institution:

Church	Type	Share (zuan or salt cubes) (1 zuan=37.8 kg)
Arad	collegiate chapter	500
Bács (Bač)	cathedral chapter	10,000
Bizere	Benedictine abbey	4,000
Bulcs (Bulci)	Benedictine abbey	5,000
Bishop of Csanád	prelate	5,000
Egres (Igriș)	Cistercian abbey	7,500
Eperjes	Benedictine abbey	3,000
Ercsi	Cistercian abbey	1,000
Archbishop of Esztergom	prelate	2,000
Gyelid	collegiate chapter (?)	500
Heiligenkreuz	Cistercian abbey	3,000
Hodos	Benedictine abbey	1,000
Knights Hospitaller	Chivalric order	10,000
Izsó	Benedictine abbey	1,000
Archbishop of Kalocsa	prelate	10,000
Kenéz	Benedictine abbey	2,000
Kerc (Cârța)	Cistercian abbey	1,000
Óbuda	collegiate chapter	2,000
Pannonhalma	Benedictine abbey	1,000
Pécsvárad	Benedictine abbey	2,000
Pilis	Cistercian abbey	2,000
Pornó	Cistercian abbey	2,000 (1,000+1,000)
Rohonca	Benedictine abbey	4,000
Székesfehérvár	collegiate chapter	2,000
Szekszárd	Benedictine abbey	1,000
Szentgotthárd	Cistercian abbey	7,500 (2,500+5,000)
Szer	Benedictine abbey	1,000
Szőreg	Benedicine abbey	1,000
Tihany	Benedictine abbey	1,000
Titel	collegiate chapter	3,000
Bishop of Transylvania	prelate	2,000
Zirc	Cistercian abbey	2,000
Altogether		100,000

Type of institution	Amount (zuan)	Share (%)
Benedictines	27,000	27
Cistercians	26,000	26
Chivalric orders	10,000	10
Prelates	19,000	19
Chapters	18,000	18
Altogether	100,000	100

== Aftermath ==
The conflict between Andrew II and the Holy See continued after the departure of papal legate James of Pecorara from Hungary in 1234. The monarch did not pay the compensation (10,000 marks) he undertook to the Church. John of Wildeshausen, the Bishop of Bosnia put Hungary under a new interdict in the first half of 1234, because Andrew had not dismissed his non-Christian officials despite his oath of Bereg. However, Archbishop Robert now supported the king, who protested against the bishop's act at the Holy See. Historian Nora Berend considered the oath of Bereg and the subsequent interdict was a chapter in the power struggle between the papacy, Hungarian prelates and the royal court. Upon Andrew's request, Pope Gregory IX allowed the investigation of the separation of non-Christians to take place once every two years. Although the pope ordered Bishop John to lift the interdict in August 1234, this did not happen. In August 1235, the pope instructed Andrew do not threaten those who abide by the provisions of the interdict, but allowed the king to defer the payment of the compensation he had undertaken.

Throughout the 13th century, the royal court continued to employ non-Christian officials, despite the oath of Bereg. During the reign of Béla IV, who ascended the Hungarian throne after the death of his father Andrew II in 1235, frequently appointed Jews as court chamberlains, for instance one Henul, Wluelius and Altman. Béla also entrusted the Jews with the mint; and coins with Hebrew letters of this period are still found in Hungary. Although Béla formally applied to the pope for permission to employ non-Christians and farm out royal revenues to them in 1239, Pope Gregory rejected it.

== Sources ==
- Almási, Tibor (1986). "A beregi egyezmény megkötésének diplomáciai mozzanatai [Diplomatic Moments in the Conclusion of the Agreement at Bereg]". Acta Universitatis Szegediensis. Acta Historica (in Hungarian). 83. MTA-SZTE-MOL Magyar Medievisztikai Kutatócsoport: 31–40. ISSN 0324-6965.
- Barabás, Gábor (2015). A pápaság és Magyarország a 13. század első felében. Pápai hatás – együttműködés – érdekellentét [The Papacy and Hungary in the First Half of the 13th Century. Papal influence – cooperation – clash of interests] (in Hungarian). Pécsi Történettudományért Kulturális Egyesület. ISBN 978-963-89482-5-0.
- Berend, Nora (2001). At the Gate of Christendom: Jews, Muslims and "Pagans" in Medieval Hungary, c. 1000–c.1300. Cambridge University Press. ISBN 978-0-521-02720-5.
- Engel, Pál (2001). The Realm of St Stephen: A History of Medieval Hungary, 895–1526. I.B. Tauris Publishers. ISBN 1-86064-061-3.
- F. Romhányi, Beatrix (2016). "A beregi egyezmény és a magyarországi sókereskedelem az Árpád-korban [The Agreement at Bereg and the Salt Trade in Hungary in the Age of Árpáds]". In Kövér, György; Pogány, Ágnes; Weisz, Boglárka (eds.). Magyar Gazdaságtörténeti Évkönyv 2016 – Válság – Kereskedelem (in Hungarian). MTA Bölcsészettudományi Kutatóközpont. pp. 265–301.
- Makkai, László; Mezey, László (1960). Árpád-kori és Anjou-kori levelek: XI–XIV. század [Letters from the Ages of Árpáds and Angevins: 11–14th Centuries] (PDF) (in Hungarian). Gondolat Kiadó.
- Weisz, Boglárka (1999). "Zsidó kamaraispánok az Árpád-korban [Jewish Ispáns of Chamber in the Age of Árpáds]". In Homonnai, Sarolta; Piti, Ferenc; Tóth, Ildikó (eds.). Tanulmányok a középkori magyar történelemről. Az I. Medievisztikai PhD-konferencia (Szeged, 1999. július 2.) előadásai (in Hungarian). University of Szeged. pp. 151–161. ISBN 963-482-421-8.
