= Szabolcs de Vajay =

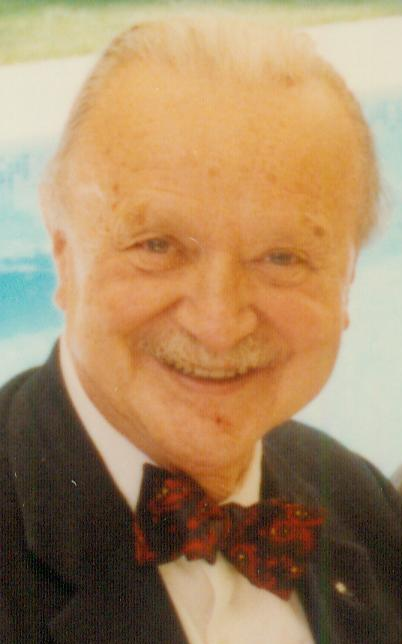
Szabolcs de Vajay in 2002

Szabolcs de Vajay (born 9 October 1921 in Budapest; died 6 July 2010 in Vevey) was a Hungarian historian and genealogist.

In 1943 he left Hungary to live abroad, in Argentina, France and Switzerland.

== Works ==
- L'aspect international des tentatives de la restoration Habsbourg en Hongrie, mars-octobre 1921. Diss. Typoskript, Paris 1947.
- Etiennette dite de Vienne, comtesse de Bourgogne. In: Annales de Bourgogne. 32, 1960, p. 233–266.
- Großfürst Geysa von Ungarn. Familie und Verwandtschaft. In: Südostforschungen. Vol. XXI, 1962, p. 88ff.
- A propos de la "Guerre de Bourgogne", notes sur les successions de Bourgogne et de Mâcon aux Xe et XIe siècles. In: Annales de Bourgogne. XXXIV, 1962.
- Agatha, Mother St. Margaret, Queen of Scotland. In: Duquesne Review. Vol. 7, No. 2 (1962), p. 71–80.
- Quelques caractéristiques de l'héraldique hongroise. In: Archivum Heraldicum. 4, 1962/64.
- La Sintesis Europea en el Abolengo y la Politica Matrimonial de Alfonso el Casto. VII Congreso de Historia de la Corona de Aragon. 1964, p. 269–299.
- Ramire le Moine, roi d'Aragon, et Agnès de Poitiers dans l'histoire et la légende. In: Mélanges René Crozet. 1966, p. 727–750.
- L' Aspect Politique des Trois Mariages de Raymond Bérenger le Grand. In: Amics de Besalù i Assemblea d'Estudis del Seu Comtat. 1968, p. 35–73.
- Der Eintritt des ungarischen Stämmebundes in die europäische Geschichte (862-933)., 1968.
- Die Ahnen der Doña Leonor Alvarez de Toledo, Großfürstin von Toskana. In: Genealogisches Jahrbuch. 8, 1968, p. 5–23.
- Dona Margarita de Cardona, Mutter des ersten Fürsten von Dietrichstein. In: Jahrbuch der k k. heraldischen Gesellschaft "ADLER". 1967/1970, Dritte Folge, Vol. 7.
- Über die Wirtschaftsverhältnisse der landnehmenden Ungarnstämme. In: Ungarn-Jahrbuch. Zeitschrift für interdisziplinäre Hungarologie, Vol. 2, 1970.
- Mahaut de Pouille, comtesse de Barcelone et vicomtesse de Narbonne, dans le contexte social de son temps. In: Actes du XLIIIe Congrès de la Fédération historique du Languedoc méditerranéen et du Roussillon: Béziers et le Biterrois. 1971
- Die Namenwahl bei den Karolingern. In: Genealogisches Jahrbuch. 15, 1975, p. 5–24.
- Corona Regia – Corona Regni –Sacra Corona. In: Ungarn-Jahrbuch. Zeitschrift für interdisziplinäre Hungarologie, Vol. 7, 1976.
- Contribution a l'Histoire de l'Attitude des Royaumes Pyrénéens dans la Querelle des Investitures: de l'Origine de Berthe, Reine d'Aragon et de Navarre. In: Estudios Genealogicos, Heraldicos y Nobilarios en Honor de Vicente Cadenas y Vicent. Vol 2, 1978, p. 375–402.
- Byzantinische Prinzessinnen in Ungarn. In: Ungarn-Jahrbuch. Zeitschrift für interdisziplinäre Hungarologie, Vol. 10, 1979.
- Comtesses d'origine occitane dans la Marche d'Espagne aux 10e and 11e siècles. Essai sur le rattachement de Richilde, de Garsende et de Letgardis, comtesses de Barcelone, et de Thietberge comtesse d'Urgel au contexte généalogique occitan. In : Hidalguía. 28 (1980), p. 585–616, 601–2.
- Structures de pouvoir et réseaux de familles du VIIIe au XIIe Siecles. Genealogica & Heraldica: Actas de 17o Congresso das Ciencias Genealogica e Heraldica. 1986, p. 275–315.
- Les Lara avant Narbonne. Heraldique et Genealogie. Vol. 27, 1986, p. 411–413.
- Vajay, Szabolcs de. From Alfonso VIII to Alfonso X. In: Studies in Genealogy and Family History in Tribute to Charles Evans on the Occasion of his Eightieth Birthday. 1989, p. 366–417.
- The animal's gift. 1994.
- L'héraldique comme reflet littéraire de l'engagement social de l'auteur. In: Jahrbuch der k k. heraldischen Gesellschaft "ADLER". 1993/2002, Dritte Folge, Band 15.
- Parlons encore d'Etiennette. In: Onomastique et Parenté dans l'Occident Médiéval. 2000, p. 2–7.
