= Kecerovský Lipovec =

Village and municipality in Slovakia

Kecerovský Lipovec Kecerlipóc
- Municipality
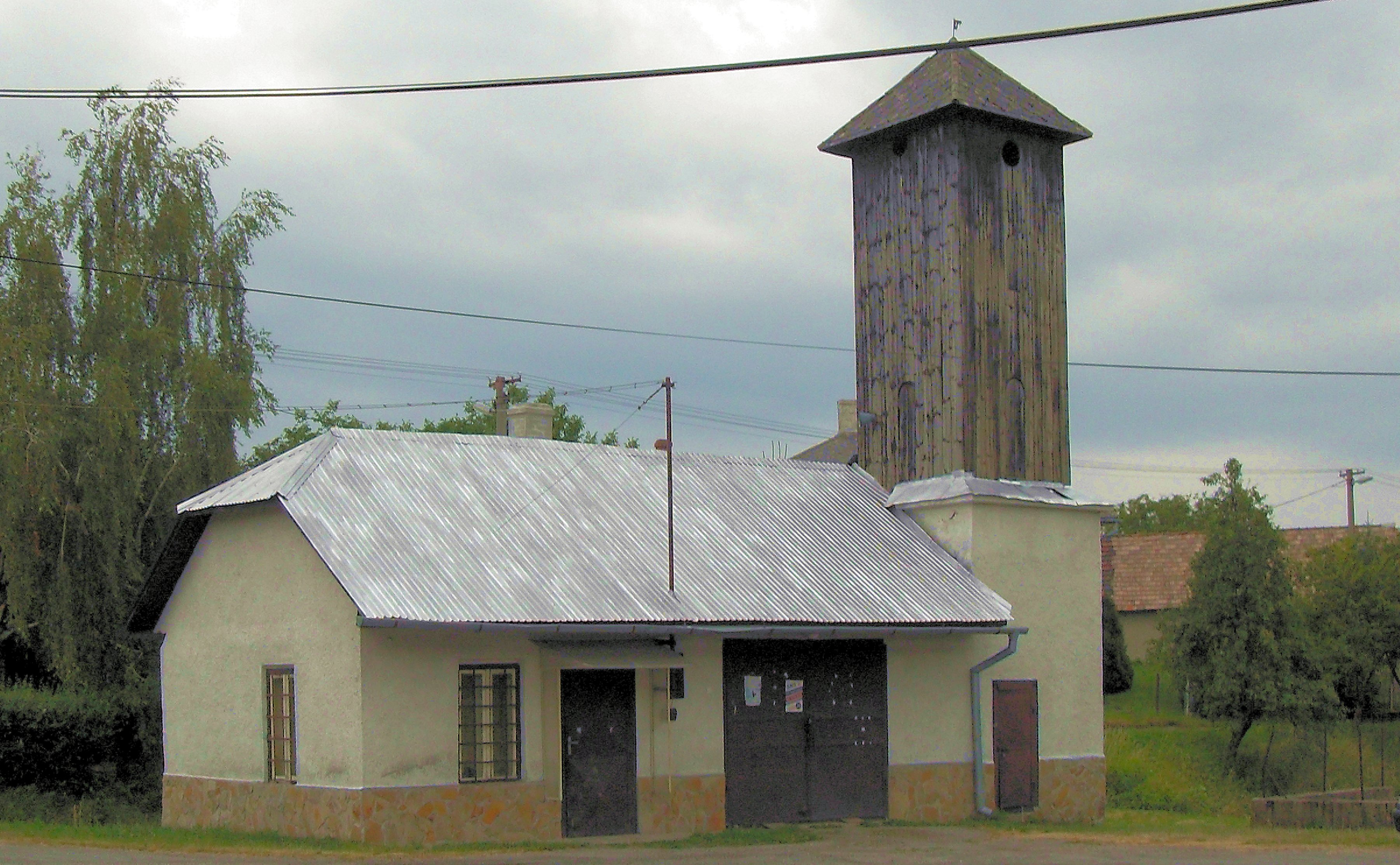

- Flag

- Location of Kecerovský Lipovec in the Košice Region Location of Kecerovský Lipovec in Slovakia
- Coordinates: 48.85°N 21.43°E
- Country: Slovakia
- Region: Košice Region
- District: Košice-okolie District
- First mentioned: 1229

Area
  - Total: 15.56 km^{2} (6.01 sq mi)
- Elevation: 354 m (1,161 ft)

Population (2025)
  - Total: 96
- Time zone: UTC+1 (CET)
  - Summer (DST): UTC+2 (CEST)
- Postal code: 444 7
- Area code: +421 55
- Vehicle registration plate (until 2022): KS

Kecerovský Lipovec (Slovak pronunciation: [ˈketserɔwskiː ˈlipɔʋets]; Hungarian: Kecerlipóc) is a village and municipality in Košice-okolie District in the Kosice Region of eastern Slovakia.

== History ==
In historical records, the village was first mentioned in 1229.

== Geography ==
The municipality lies at an altitude of 354 metres (1,161 ft) and covers an area of 15.56 km^{2} (6.01 sq mi) (2025).

== Population ==
Population statistic (10 years)
Year	1995	2005	2015	2025
Count	155	112	119	96
Difference		−27.74%	+6.25%	−19.32%

Population statistic
Year	2024	2025
Count	100	96
Difference		−4%

It has a population of 96 people (31 December 2025).

=== Ethnicity ===
Census 2021 (1+ %)
Ethnicity	Number	Fraction
Slovak	111	98.23%
Not found out	3	2.65%
Total	113	

In year 2021 was 113 people by ethnicity 111 as Slovak, 3 as Not found out, 1 as Hungarian and 1 as Other.

Note on population: The difference values of population numbers in the table "Population statistic" and in the sections "Ethnicity" & "Religion" is caused by the use of various statistical methods.

=== Religion ===
Census 2021 (1+ %)
Religion	Number	Fraction
Evangelical Church	63	55.75%
Roman Catholic Church	39	34.51%
Other and not ascertained christian church	3	2.65%
Jehovah's Witnesses	3	2.65%
Apostolic Church	3	2.65%
None	2	1.77%
Total	113	

In year 2021 was 113 people by religion 63 from Evangelical Church, 39 from Roman Catholic Church, 3 from Other and not ascertained christian church, 3 from Jehovah's Witnesses, 3 from Apostolic Church and 2 from None.

== Genealogical resources ==
The records for genealogical research are available at the state archive "Statny Archiv in Kosice, Slovakia"

- Roman Catholic church records (births/marriages/deaths): 1755-1895 (parish B)
- Greek Catholic church records (births/marriages/deaths): 1773-1895 (parish B)
- Lutheran church records (births/marriages/deaths): 1784-1895 (parish B)

== See also ==
- List of municipalities and towns in Slovakia
