= Böszörmény =

Muslims who lived in medieval Hungary

Böszörmény, Izmaelita, Hysmaelita ('Ishmaelites'), Szerecsen ('Saracens') or Káliz ('Khalyzians'), were names used to refer to the Muslims who lived in medieval Hungary. They constituted a significant part of the population from the foundation of the state at end of the 9th century until the late 13th century.

Over time, this community was joined by groups of Muslim settlers. They were primarily engaged in trading and finance, but some were employed as mercenaries by the kings of Hungary. Their rights were gradually restricted from the establishment of the Christian Kingdom of Hungary in the 11th century. Nonetheless, they maintained a significant presence into the 13th century, but gradually diminished by the end of the 13th century.

== Origins ==
A significant minority of the conquering Hungarians who settled in the Carpathian Basin belonged to the Muslim faith. They were likely joined by Muslims from other ethnic groups who immigrated over the course of the 10th to 12th centuries. Most of them likely arrived from Volga Bulgaria, but toponyms (káliz: khalyzians) suggest that they also arrived from the Khwarezm region within the territories of present-day Turkmenistan and Uzbekistan. The latter group (or part of them) may have been linked to three Khavar (Khazar) tribes of the Hungarian tribal federation.

The Arab historian and geographer al-Mas'ūdī recorded in the 10th century that the heads of the tribal federation had welcomed Muslim merchants and the merchants even converted more of the Hungarians to Islam. Al-Bakrī also mentioned that the Hungarians freed Muslims who had been captured in neighbouring countries, by paying ransoms. In the 10th century, Ibrahim ibn Yaqub described the Muslim merchants who arrived in Prague from the territories of the Hungarians and traded slaves and tin. The Gesta Hungarorum recorded that many Muslims arrived in the Carpathian Basin from Volga Bulgaria during the reign of Taksony, Grand Prince of the Hungarians (c. 955 – before 972) and they settled down there. The work of the Andalusi Muslim traveler, Abu Hamid al-Ghranati, who spent three years in the kingdom (1150–1153), supports that the Muslims living in the Kingdom of Hungary were composed of two groups: the Khwarezmians and the Maghrebians (Böszörmény). He was entrusted by King Géza II of Hungary to recruit soldiers among the Maghrebians (Böszörmény) living east of the Carpathian Basin. The Byzantine historian John Kinnamosmentioned that káliz warriors were captured during the war between the kingdom and the Byzantine Empire in 1165 and the Emperor Manuel I Komnenos removed some of them to Byzantine territories.

== Muslim territories in the Kingdom of Hungary ==
Muslims formed a number of settlements across the Carpathian Basin. Their largest communities lived in the southern parts of the Kingdom of Hungary in Syrmia and in region where the Drava joins the Danube. Other significant groups of Muslims lived in and around Pest (especially after the migration of Muslim Bulgar nobles Bila and Baks), in the Nyírség (around Hajdúböszörmény) and around Nitra (Hungarian: Nyitra). The Arab geographer Yaqut al-Hamawi mentioned that Muslims from the Kingdom of Hungary were studying in Aleppo in the beginning of the 13th century. The students arrived in Aleppo from a frontier region of the kingdom where there were reportedly 30 Muslim villages.

== The Muslims' life in the kingdom ==
Most of the Muslims in the Kingdom of Hungary were engaged in trading and they were rich enough to lease royal properties in the 13th century. Other Muslims were employed in the king's army and participated in wars against the Byzantine Empire. Yaqut al-Hamawi's work proves that the Muslim population spoke the Hungarian language by the beginning of the 13th century.

Royal decrees issued in the second half of the 11th century by the kings of Hungary persecuted the Muslims, requiring their conversion into Christianity. King Ladislaus I of Hungary commanded that converted Muslims who continued to follow Islam were to be removed from their original settlements. King Coloman of Hungary ordered that each Muslim settlement had to build a church, and he prohibited marriage between Muslims. Probably in the next century, the kings also prohibited the building of walls around Muslim settlements.

It is reported that the "Maghrebian" soldiers followed Islam openly, but it was Abu Hamid al-Ghranati who taught them several Islamic traditions. Upon his request, King Géza II (1141–1162) even permitted the "Maghrebians" to have concubines. Abu Hamid al-Gharnati reported that Géza II of Hungary expressed a great fondness of Muslims. However, those working in the direct service of the king did not practice their faith openly.

== Muslims in the 13th century ==
The Golden Bull of King Andrew II prohibited the employment of Muslims as minters and tax collectors. The king, however, continued to employ them in his administration. On 3 March 1231, Pope Gregory IX requested the prelates of the kingdom to protest against this practise, and authorized them to use ecclesiastical penalties for this reason. In the same year, King Andrew had to confirm the provisions of the Golden Bull but he continued to employ Muslims. Therefore, on 25 February 1232, Archbishop Robert of Esztergom placed the Kingdom of Hungary under an interdict and excommunicated some high dignitaries of the king. Pope Gregory IX sent a legate to the kingdom who reached an agreement with King Andrew on 20 August 1233 in Bereg. Under the agreement, the Muslims and the Jews could not hold royal offices and they were obliged to wear distinctive cloths. However, the king did not fulfill all the provisions of the agreement and therefore he was excommunicated, although he was absolved soon. On 10 December 1239, Pope Gregory IX even authorized King Béla IV of Hungary to lease his revenues to non-Christians.

Nevertheless, following the Mongol invasion of the kingdom (1241–1242) references to the Muslims in the kingdom became scarce. In 1290, King Ladislaus IV of Hungary appointed a former Muslim, Mizse, to the office of the Palatine.

The Böszörmény denomination is preserved as a family name and in toponyms, such as Hajdúböszörmény and Berekböszörmény.

== See also ==
- Besermyan
- Islam in Hungary
- Ishmael

== Sources ==
- Benda, Kálmán (editor): Magyarország történeti kronológiája (The Historical Chronology of Hungary); Akadémiai Kiadó, 1981, Budapest; ISBN 963-05-2661-1.
- Kristó, Gyula: Nem magyar népek a középkori Magyarországon (Non-Hungarian Peoples in the Medieval Hungary); Lucidus Kiadó, 2003, Budapest; ISBN 963-9465-15-1.
- Kristó, Gyula (editor): Korai Magyar Történeti Lexikon - 9-14. század (Encyclopedia of the Early Hungarian History - 9-14th centuries); Akadémiai Kiadó, 1994, Budapest; ISBN 963-05-6722-9.
