= Ampud =

Palatine of Hungary
- Reign: c. 1164 – c. 1176
- Predecessor: Héder
- Successor: Farkas Gatal
- Died: 1186
- Issue: Ampud II

Ampud, also Ampod, Apod or Ompud (Latin: Ompudinus; died 1186) was a powerful aristocrat in the Kingdom of Hungary in the second half of the 12th century. He was Ban of Slavonia between 1163 or 1164 and 1171 or 1174, and Palatine of Hungary from around 1164 till around 1176.

== Career ==
Based on his forename, historian Péter Juhász considered that Ampud belonged to the gens (clan) Tomaj of Pecheneg origin. He was mentioned as an "Ispán" (count) by a royal charter from 1162. Ampud was a loyal supporter of the young Stephen III of Hungary, whose right to the crown was challenged by his two uncles, Ladislaus II and Stephen IV, who had fled to the Byzantine Empire during their brother, Géza II's reign and gained support of Emperor Manuel I Komnenos. Following the victory over the usurper Stephen IV in June 1163, Manuel made peace with Stephen III who agreed to send his younger brother, Béla, to Constantinople and to allow the Byzantines to seize Béla's duchy, which included Croatia, Dalmatia and Sirmium. However an 1164 charter of Peter, the Archbishop of Split was dated in reference to the rule of Ban Ampud, suggesting that at least a part of Béla's duchy—Central Dalmatia—was under Stephen's rule in that year, thus Stephen soon broke the treaty with Manuel.

Ampud was a skilled military leader. He took part in Stephen's campaign in Dalmatia. As Ban of Slavonia, he led a punitive expedition and captured Zadar in 1164. When Stephen III stormed into Sirmium and recaptured the whole province in spring 1166, a Hungarian army led by Ampud invaded Dalmatia and captured sebastos Nicephorus Chalouphes, the Byzantine governor of the province. He unsuccessfully besieged Spalato, but recaptured Biograd na Moru and Šibenik, as royal charters issued on behalf of the Hungarian monarch and Stephen III also confirmed estates in the two towns. According to historian Gyula Kristó, the overwhelming portion of Dalmatia was under Byzantine control and the ban's original territory had been drastically reduced since the 1160s, when Amoud held the dignity.

According to a non-authentic royal charter, Ampud was Ispán of Csanád County in 1171. He retained his positions after the coronation of Béla III in 1172, proving Ampud had supported him in a struggle for the throne against Prince Géza.

In 1176, he was one of the two commanders of the Hungarian auxiliary troops, alongside Voivode Leustach Rátót, sent by Béla III of Hungary to fight along the Byzantines against the Seljuks in the Battle of Myriokephalon. The battle was a heavy defeat for the Byzantine–Antiochian–Hungarian forces. Ampud died in 1186, according to the Annales Posonienses.

== Family ==
Ampud's namesake son served as Ispán of Szolnok County in 1199, but there is no more information about him. He married an unidentified daughter of Count Berthold III of Andechs, Margrave of Istria, which reflects the social prestige of the older Ampud. His grandchild Denis made a more significant political career by introducing a new economic system as Master of the treasury (1216–1224) and by holding the position of Palatine of Hungary (1227–1228, 1231–1234) during the reign of Andrew II of Hungary.

== Sources ==
- Gál, Judit (2020). Dalmatia and the Exercise of Royal Authority in the Árpád-Era Kingdom of Hungary. Arpadiana III., Research Centre for the Humanities. ISBN 978-963-416-227-8.
- Juhász, Péter (2019). Anonymus: fikció és realitás. Az Álmos-ág honfoglalása [Anonymus: Fiction and Reality. The Landtaking of the Álmos Branch] (in Hungarian). Belvedere Meridionale. ISBN 978-615-5372-96-4.
- Makk, Ferenc (1989). The Árpáds and the Comneni: Political Relations between Hungary and Byzantium in the 12th century (Translated by György Novák). Akadémiai Kiadó. ISBN 963-05-5268-X.
- Markó, László (2006). A magyar állam főméltóságai Szent Istvántól napjainkig: Életrajzi Lexikon [Great Officers of State in Hungary from King Saint Stephen to Our Days: A Biographical Encyclopedia] (in Hungarian). Helikon Kiadó. ISBN 963-208-970-7.
- Stephenson, Paul (2000). Byzantium's Balkan Frontier: A Political Study of the Northern Balkans, 900–1204. Cambridge University Press. ISBN 978-0-521-02756-4.
- Thoroczkay, Gábor, ed. (2018). Írott források az 1116–1205 közötti magyar történelemről [Written Sources of the Hungarian History between 1116 and 1205] (in Hungarian). Szegedi Középkorász Műhely. ISBN 978-615-80398-3-3.
- Zsoldos, Attila (2011). Magyarország világi archontológiája, 1000–1301 [Secular Archontology of Hungary, 1000–1301] (in Hungarian). História, MTA Történettudományi Intézete. ISBN 978-963-9627-38-3.

Political offices
Preceded by Héder	Palatine of Hungary; 1164–1176	Succeeded by Farkas Gatal
Preceded by Beloš	Ban of Slavonia; 1164–1174	Succeeded by Denis
