= Coloman of Galicia =

Coloman
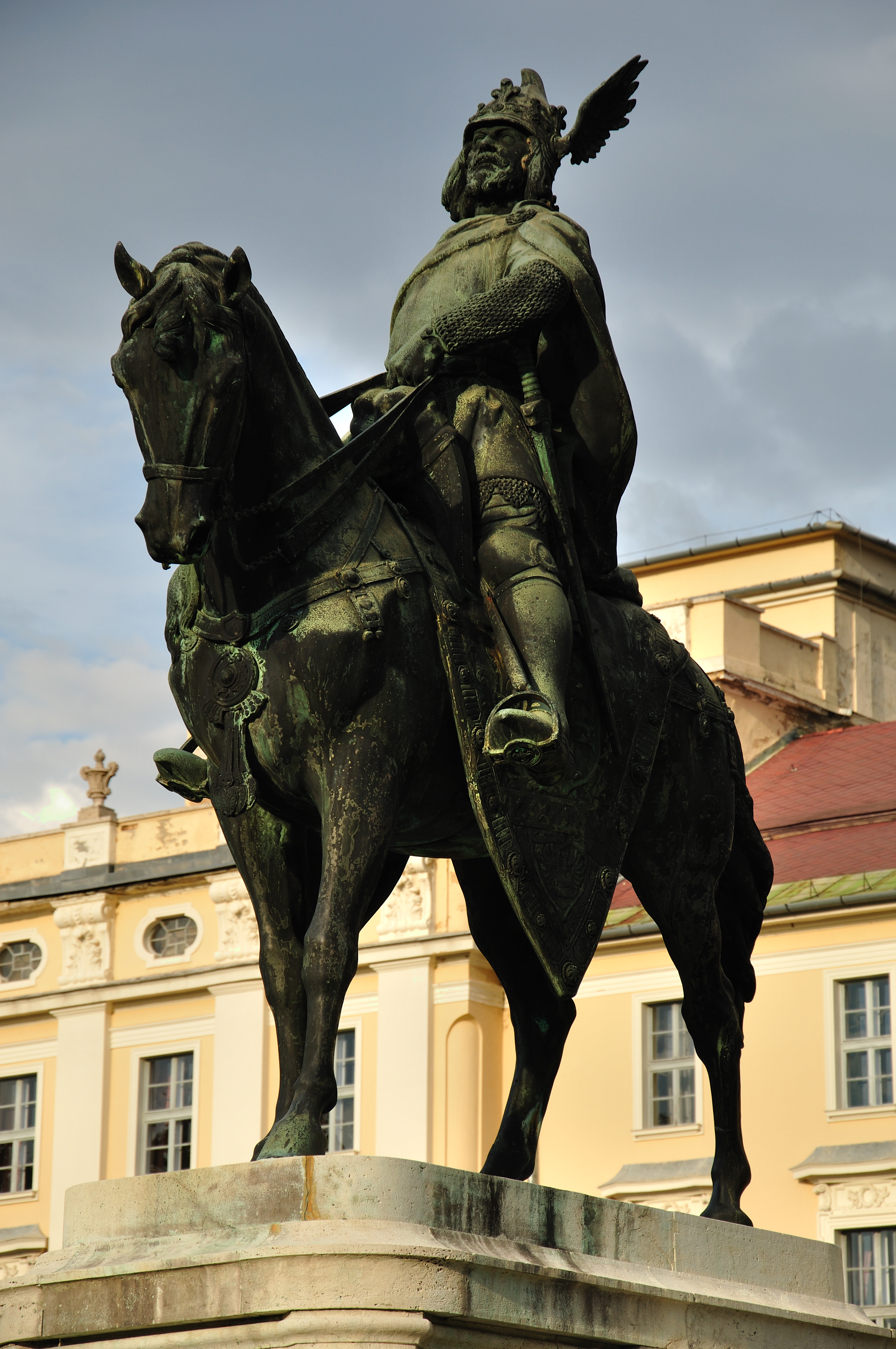
- Coloman's statue in Gödöllő

Prince/King of Galicia
- Reign: 1214–1219; 1219–1221
- Coronation: early 1216
- Predecessor: Vladislav Kormilichich (regent); Mstislav Mstislavich
- Successor: Mstislav Mstislavich
- Born: 1208
- Died: May 1241 (aged 32–33); Čazma, Slavonia
- Spouse: Salomea of Poland
- Dynasty: Árpád
- Father: Andrew II of Hungary
- Mother: Gertrude of Merania

Coloman of Galicia (Hungarian: Kálmán; Ukrainian: Коломан; 1208 – 1241) was the ruler—from 1214 prince, and from 1215 or 1216 to 1221, the king—of Galicia, and the duke of Slavonia from 1226 to his death. He was the second son of Andrew II of Hungary and Gertrude of Merania. His father and Leszek the White, Duke of Poland, concluded an agreement about the marriage of Coloman and Leszek's daughter, Salomea, and the division of Galicia, allotting its western regions to Leszek, the remaining lands to Coloman. The Hungarian and Polish armies occupied the principality in late 1214. Andrew II appointed a Hungarian nobleman, Benedict the Bald, to administer it on Coloman's behalf. Coloman was crowned the first king of Galicia with the pope's authorization in early 1216.

After the Hungarian troops occupied the western Galician territories, Leszek made an alliance with Mstislav Mstislavich, Prince of Novgorod. Mstislav invaded Galicia, forcing Coloman and his supporters to flee to Hungary, most probably in early 1219. Mstislav supported his son-in-law, Daniel Romanovich—who had claimed Galicia since 1205—to invade Polish territories, which brought about a reconciliation between Andrew II and Leszek. The Hungarians and Poles again occupied Galicia and restored it to Coloman in the autumn of 1219. Mstislav and his Cuman allies defeated the Hungarians near Galicia and captured Coloman and Salomea in August 1221. To secure their release, Andrew II renounced Galicia and arranged a marriage alliance between his youngest son, Andrew, and Mstislav's daughter.

Coloman returned to Hungary in late 1221 or 1222. He settled in Szepes (now Spiš in Slovakia) where he had held large estates since the late 1210s. Andrew II made him duke of Slavonia, with jurisdiction also in Croatia and Dalmatia, in 1226. He cooperated with his eldest brother, Béla, in revising their father's donations already during Andrew II's lifetime.

== Early life ==
Coloman was the second son of Andrew II of Hungary and his first wife, Gertrude of Merania. Andrew's father (Coloman's grandfather), Béla III of Hungary, was the first king of Hungary to conquer the Principality of Galicia in 1188. Béla granted Galicia to his son Andrew, but the young prince was unpopular, especially because his troops did not respect the Galicians' Eastern Orthodox faith. The Galicians expelled him in 1189 or 1190, but he did not abandon his claim to Galicia.

After Roman Mstislavich, who had united the principalities of Galicia and Volhynia (centered in Volodymyr-Volynskyi, thus: Lodomeria), died fighting against the Poles in 1205, Andrew launched a military campaign against Galicia-Volhynia in almost each year. He adopted the title of "King of Galicia and Lodomeria" in token of his claim to both principalities. Initially, he supported Roman Mstislavich's minor sons, Daniel and Vasilko Romanovich, against Vladimir Igorevich and his brothers, who also claimed Galicia.

Coloman was born in 1208. According to historians Márta Font and Gábor Barabás, he was named most probably for Coloman of Stockerau, an Irish pilgrim who had been martyred in Austria in 1012. Coloman's mother showed blatant favoritism towards her German kinsmen and courtiers, which outraged the native lords. She was murdered by a group of Hungarian noblemen in September 1213, shortly after her husband departed for a new military campaign against Galicia. Andrew returned to Hungary, but only after appointing a Galician boyar (or nobleman), Vladislav Kormilichich, to lead the Hungarian army to Galicia. Kormilichich took control of the principality on Andrew's behalf. Leszek the White, Duke of Poland, granted asylum to Daniel and Vasilko Romanovich and made an alliance with princes Alexandr Vsevolodovich of Vladimir and Mstislav Yaroslavich of Peresopnytsia. They invaded Galicia and routed Kormilichich, but they could not capture the capital of the principality.

In a letter to Pope Innocent III, Andrew stated that Galician boyars had proposed him to grant Galicia to Coloman. According to the Galician–Volhynian Chronicle, Leszek the White was the first to suggest the same idea, also proposing his daughter, Salomea, to Coloman. Andrew and Leszek had a meeting in Szepes in the autumn of 1214. (Note: The Galician–Volhynian Chronicle is the most important source of Coloman's rule in Galicia; its variants narrate the events without a precise chronology, thus most dates of this period are uncertain (Font & Barabás (2017), p. 13.) They reached a compromise, which included the marriage of Coloman and Salomea and the cession of two western Galician towns, Przemyśl and Lubaczów, to Leszek. The Polish and Hungarian armies invaded the principality and put an end to Vladislav Kormilichich's rule before the end of the year.

[Andrew II] marched against [Leszek the White] whom [Daniel Romanovich] was visiting at that time. [Thereupon Leszek] sent his envoy Lestič and the boyar Pakoslav [to Andrew] with the [following] message: "It is not proper for a boyar to reign in [Halych]; marry my daughter to your son [Coloman] and let him rule in [Halych]. [Andrew] liked Pakoslav's [advice]. He held council with [Leszek] in [Szepes] and took [Leszek's] daughter for his son.

— Galician–Volhynian Chronicle

== Galicia ==
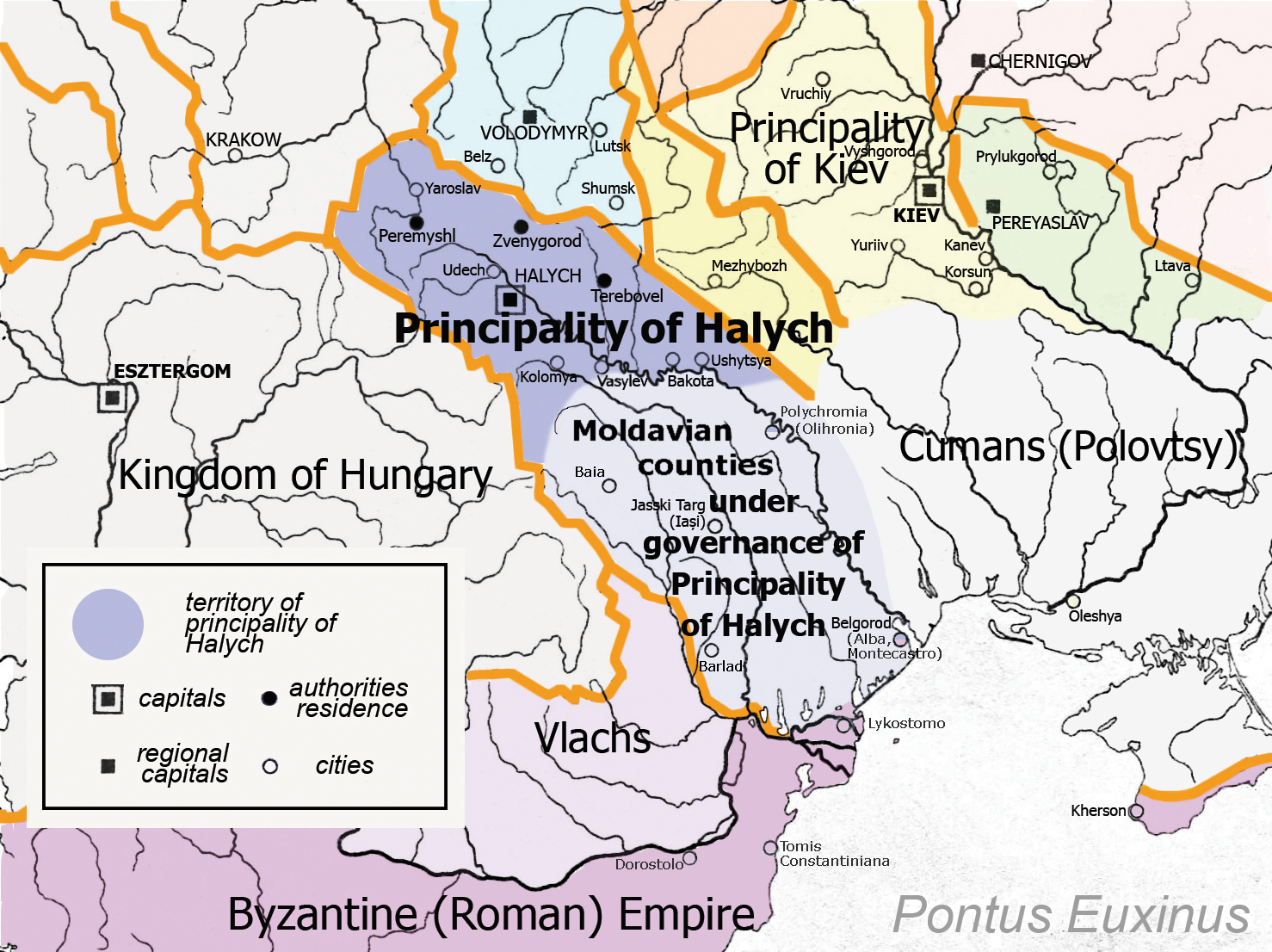
The Principality of Galicia and its neighbors

Coloman was installed in Galicia soon after the fall of Kormilichich. Since Coloman was a minor, Benedict the Bald was appointed to administer the principality. Another Hungarian nobleman, Demetrius Aba, was made the master of the stewards in Coloman's court before 1216. Kormilichich's former ally, Sudislav, was one of the leading Galician boyars who supported Coloman.

Andrew sent a letter to Pope Innocent, requesting him to authorize John, Archbishop of Esztergom to anoint Coloman as king. In his next letter, Andrew thanked the pope for giving consent to Coloman's coronation, but also informed him that a riot had broken out against Coloman and the rebels laid siege to Galicia. Andrew urged Innocent to send a legate and a golden crown to Coloman to strengthen the legitimacy of his rule. Pope Honorius III mentioned in a letter in 1222 that the Archbishop of Esztergom had crowned Coloman "with the blessing of the Holy See", but the circumstances of the ceremony are unknown. Historians Font, Barabás and Karol Hollý inferred from the correspondence that Coloman was most probably crowned twice: first (in late 1214 or early 1215) with a provisional crown in Hungary, later (probably in early 1216) with the crown sent by the pope. Other historians—including Tibor Almási, Nataša Procházková and Đura Hardi—conclude that Coloman was first anointed, and he was only once crowned, in early 1216.

The relationship between Andrew and Leszek the White had meanwhile become tense. Leszek granted Vladimir-in-Vohynia, which was the most prestigious princely seat in Volhynia, to Daniel and Vasilko Romanovich. He also failed to support Coloman during the siege of Galicia. The Hungarian army invaded western Galicia and captured Przemyśl and Lubaczów in late 1215 or early 1216. Leszek approached Mstislav Mstislavich, Prince of Novgorod, seeking his assistance against the Hungarians. The reconstruction of the ensuing events is difficult, because their dating is uncertain. Mstislav invaded Galicia between 1215 and 1219—most probably in early 1219, according to Font and Barabás—and forced Coloman, Benedict the Bald and Sudislav to flee to Hungary.

Mstislav gave his daughter, Anna, in marriage to Daniel Romanovich who soon occupied the lands between the rivers Wieprz and Bug from Leszek. Outraged by Daniel's attack, Leszek made a new alliance with Andrew II. Their united forces defeated Mstislav's army in three battles in October 1219. Mstislav and Daniel were forced to abandon Galicia and Coloman returned to the principality. Andrew most probably made Sudislav's son-in-law, Philnius, the commander of the Hungarian army in Galicia around this time, according to Font and Barabás.

Mstislav hired Cumans and again invaded Galicia in late 1220 or early 1221, but could not capture the capital. Mstislav's fiasco encouraged Philnius to join Leszek's campaign against Volhynia, leaving Coloman and Salomea in the newly fortified Church of the Virgin Mary in Galicia. Taking advantage of the absence of the bulk of the Hungarian army, Mstislav and the Cumans laid siege to Galicia in August 1221. (Note: Historian Martin Dimnik writes, Mstislav captured Coloman in both 1219 and 1221. (Dimnik (2003), pp. 290–291.) Philnius hurried back from his campaign, but Mstislav defeated his army and he could only flee with the help of a Galician boyar, Zhiroslav on 14 August. Coloman's retainers tried to resist in the fortified church, but the lack of water forced them to surrender. The Polish chronicler, Jan Długosz, wrote that Coloman and Salomea were imprisoned in the fortress of Torchesk.

Internal strifes in Hungary prevented Coloman's father from launching a military expedition against Mstislav. Andrew entered into negotiations with Mstislav and they reached a compromise in late 1221 or early 1222. According to the agreement, Coloman was to renounce the title of King of Galicia, but Mstislav agreed to give his daughter, Maria, in marriage to Coloman's younger brother, Andrew, to whom Coloman's royal title would be transferred.

[Princes] Mstislav and [ Volodimir ] went from Kiev to [Halych] against the King's son, and the men of [Halych] came out against them and [Czechs] and [Poles], Moravians and Hungarians, and the forces came together. And God helped Mstislav, and he entered the town of [Halych] and they took with their hands the King's son and his wife, and he took peace with the King, and let go his son, and himself took his seat in [Halych] and [Volodimir] in Kiev.

— The Chronicle of Novgorod

== Kingdom of Hungary ==
=== Szepes ===
After his release in late 1221 or early 1222, Coloman returned to Hungary. His father soon approached Pope Honorius III, asking him to invalidate his agreement with Mstislav. The pope only cancelled the provision about the transfer of Coloman's royal title to his younger brother, because the pope preserved the right to decide about coronations. Coloman styled himself "King of Galicia" till the end of his life, although he never returned to Galicia. He and his wife settled in Szepes, near the Hungarian-Galician border. Font and Barabás say that Coloman had received estates in the region already in the late 1210s. A late source (a 1279 letter of Elizabeth the Cuman) mentioned that Coloman had held Szepes till the end of his life.

Coloman's activities in Szepes are poorly documented. He granted privileges to the "guest settlers" in Szepesolaszi (now Spišské Vlachy in Slovakia). He made donations to the Cistercian monastery which was established in the 1220s in Szepes. Coloman also supported the establishment of the Premonstratensian provostry at Jászó (now Jasov in Slovakia). According to a scholarly theory, the tower of the Szepes Castle was built on Coloman's order.

=== Slavonia ===
Andrew II entrusted Coloman with the government of Slavonia, Croatia and Dalmatia in 1226. The three provinces had been administered by Coloman's elder brother, Béla, who was appointed to administer Translyvania. Coloman's jurisdiction also included counties located in Hungary proper, such as Baranya, Pozsega, Somogy, Valkó, Varasd and Zala.

In the summer of 1226, Coloman visited Dalmatia where he was ceremoniously received in the towns. He made donations to the Bishopric of Trogir and confirmed his mother's grant to the Hájszentlőrinc Chapter. His following extant diplomas were issued in 1229. Estates located in Szepes were the subjects of both diplomas, implying that Coloman had mostly stayed in Szepes from 1226 to 1229, according to Font and Barabás.

Coloman supported Béla's attempts to revise their father's grants already during Andrew II's lifetime. The two brothers jointly confirmed a grant made by a previous ban of Croatia in 1231. Coloman ignored the privileges of the Knights Templar and wanted to collect taxes on their estates. The pope appointed Bartholomew le Gros, the bishop of Pécs, to arbitrate in the dispute together with the abbot of Pécsvárad Abbey and the provost of Pécs Chapter, but also forbade them to excommunicate Coloman without his special authorization. The three prelates persuaded Coloman to confirm the knights' privileges on 31 July 1231, but a full reconciliation was reached only after lengthy negotiations in 1239.

Coloman granted liberties to the German, Saxon, Hungarian and Slavic "guest settlers" of Vukovar in 1239. He also confirmed the right of the "guest settlers" of Varaždin to elect their judges and put their obligations in writing.

Coloman initiated the merger of the Archbishopric of Split and the Bishopric of Zagreb, but Pope Gregory IX reminded him in 1240, that the two dioceses could not be united without the consent of the archbishop of Kalocsa and the chapters of their sees.

In 1231, Coloman granted privileges to Vukovar (Hungarian: Valkóvár). Coloman, similarly to his brother, opposed his father's third marriage with Beatrice d'Este and following the death of King Andrew II (21 September 1235) they accused their young stepmother of adultery.

Pope Gregory IX persuaded him to pursue the heretics in his provinces and in the adjacent territories; therefore he invaded and occupied Bosnia and Zachlumia but he could not wind up the Bosnian Church. He supported the establishment of the Diocese of Bosnia and he granted Đakovo (Hungarian: Diakóvár) to its bishop.

When he was informed that the Mongols invaded the kingdom, he joined his brother's troops. However, their troops were defeated at the Battle of Mohi (11 April 1241). Coloman suffered serious wounds and died of his injuries a few weeks after the battle.

== Titles ==
Coloman was styled "by the Grace of God, king of the Ruthenians, and by his glorious father's generosity, duke of Dalmatia and Croatia" (Latin: nos Colomannus, Dei gratia Ruthenorum rex, et largitate gloriosi patris nostri Andree, Hungarorum regis, dux Dalmatie atque Croatie) in his first extant charter in 1226.

Göncöl, Archbishop of Split, referred to Coloman as "king and duke of Slavonia" in 1229. The first document mentioning Coloman's rule in "whole Slavonia" was issued by the Zagreb Chapter in 1230. He was consequently styled as "king, and duke of whole Slavonia" from the late 1230s.

== Ancestry ==
Ancestors of Coloman of Galicia

16. Béla II of Hungary
8. Géza II of Hungary
17. Helena of Raška
4. Béla III of Hungary
18. Mstislav I of Kiev
9. Euphrosyne of Kiev
19. Liubava Dmitrievna Zavidich
2. Andrew II of Hungary
20. Henry I of Châtillon
10. Raynald of Châtillon
21. Ermengarde of Montjay
5. Agnes of Antioch
22. Bohemund II of Antioch
11. Constance of Antioch
23. Alice of Jerusalem
1. Coloman of Hungary
24. Berthold III, Count of Diessen, Plassenberg and Stein
12. Berthold III of Andechs
25. Sophie of Istria
6. Berthold IV, Duke of Merania
26. Otto IV, Count of Wittelsbach
13. Hedwig of Wittelsbach
27. Heilika of Pettendorf-Lengenfeld-Hopfenohe
3. Gertrude of Merania
28. Conrad, Margrave of Meissen
14. Dedo V, Count of Wettin
29. Luitgard of Elchingen-Ravenstein
7. Agnes of Wettin and Rochlitz
30. Goswin II of Heinsberg
15. Matilda of Heinsberg
31. Aleidis von Sommerschenburg

== Sources ==
- Almási, Tibor (1994). "Kálmán 2.". In Kristó, Gyula; Engel, Pál; Makk, Ferenc (eds.). Korai magyar történeti lexikon (9–14. század) [Encyclopedia of the Early Hungarian History (9th–14th centuries)] (in Hungarian). Akadémiai Kiadó. p. 316. ISBN 963-05-6722-9.
- Barabás, Gábor (2016). "Coloman of Galicia and his Polish Relations: The Duke of Slavonia as Protector of Widowed Duchesses" (PDF). Hungaro–Polonica: Young Scholars on Medieval Polish–Hungarian Relations. Pécs: Történészcéh Egyesület. pp. 89–117. Archived from the original on 18 April 2025.
- Barabás, Gábor (2017). "The Titles of the Hungarian Royal Family in the Light of Hungarian and Papal Sources in the First Half of the Thirteenth Century". Chronica [Szeged]. 13: 28–44.
- Barabás, Gábor (2019). "Prince Coloman's Life after 1226: A Member of the Árpádian Dynasty and Central European Narrative Sources". Hungary and Hungarians in Central and East European Narrative Sources (10th–17th Centuries). Pécs: University of Pécs. pp. 107–123.
- Barabás, Gábor (2020). "A King in Slavonia: Prince Coloman in the Realm of St. Stephen in the 1230s". Stefan the First-Crowned and His Time. Belgrade: Institute of History. pp. 291–308.
- Dimnik, Martin (2003). The Dynasty of Chernigov, 1146–1246. New York: Cambridge University Press.
- Engel, Pál (2001). The Realm of St Stephen: A History of Medieval Hungary, 895–1526. London & New York: I.B.Tauris.
- Font, Márta (1991). "II. András orosz politikája és hadjáratai [Andrew II's policy and campaigns in Rus']". Századok (in Hungarian). 125 (1–2): 107–144. ISSN 0039-8098.
- Font, Márta (2000). "On the frontiers of West and East: The Hungarian kingdom and the Galician principality between the eleventh and thirteenth centuries" (PDF). Annual of medieval studies at Central European University. 6: 171–180. Archived from the original on 20 February 2025.
- Font, Márta (2012). "Principles and Methods in the Policy of the Hungarian King, Andreas II concerning the Galician-Volhynian Principality". Principalities in lands of Galicia and Volhynia in international relations in the 11th-14th centuries. Colloquia Russica, I/2. Krakow: Uniwersytet Jagielloński. pp. 228–235.
- Font, Márta; Barabás, Gábor (2017). Kálmán, Halics királya, Szlavónia hercege, 1208–1241 [Coloman, King of Halych, Duke of Slavonia, 1208–1241] (in Hungarian). Magyar Történelmi Társulat–Kronosz Kiadó. ISBN 978-963-467-000-1.
- Font, Márta; Barabás, Gábor (2019). Coloman, King of Galicia and Duke of Slavonia (1208–1241): Medieval Central Europe and Hungarian Power. Leeds: Arc Humanities Press.
- Font, Márta (2019). "Coloman, the King of Galicia: The Problems of Coronation". Specimina nova: Pars prima, Sectio mediaevalis: Dissertationes historicae collectae per Cathedra Historiae Medii Aevi Modernorumque Temporum Universitatis Quinqueecclesiensis. 10: 81–94. Archived from the original on 23 December 2025.
- Font, Márta (2021). "Meeting of Rulers in the Scepus Region (1214)". Specimina nova: Pars prima, Sectio mediaevalis: Dissertationes historicae collectae per Cathedra Historiae Medii Aevi Modernorumque Temporum Universitatis Quinqueecclesiensis. 11: 11–22. Archived from the original on 8 November 2024.
- Font, Márta (2023). "The Title rex Galiciae between Ambitions and Reality (c. 1100-r. 1400)". Unions and Divisions: New Forms of Rule in Medieval and Renaissance Europe. New York: Routledge. pp. 107–118.
- Gál, Judit (2020). Dalmatia and the Exercise of Royal Authority in the Árpád-Era Kingdom of Hungary (PDF). Budapest: Research Centre for the Humanities. Archived from the original on 23 December 2025.
- Hollý, Karol (2007). "Princess Salomea and Hungarian–Polish Relations in the Period 1214–1241" (PDF). Historický Časopis. 55 (Supplement): 5–32. ISSN 0018-2575.
- Homza, Martin (2012). "Coloman King of Galicia (1208?-1241) on the background of Arpad dynasty's foreign and home policy in the first half of the 13th century". Principalities in lands of Galicia and Volhynia in international relations in the 11th-14th centuries. Colloquia Russica, I/2. Krakow: Uniwersytet Jagielloński. pp. 236–242.
- Homza, Martin (2021). "Coloman of Galicia, a Symbol of Medieval Intellectual Culture Between Slovakia and Croatia". Intellectual Connections Between Croatia and Slovakia. Studia Carpathico-Adriatica, II. Zagreb: Slovak–Croatian Commission of Humanities. pp. 15–24.
- Kristó, Gyula; Makk, Ferenc (1996). Az Árpád-ház uralkodói [Rulers of the House of Árpád] (in Hungarian). I.P.C. Könyvek. ISBN 963-7930-97-3.
- Runciman, Steven (1989). A History of the Crusades, Volume II: The Kingdom of Jerusalem and the Frankish East 1100–1187. Cambridge University Press. ISBN 0-521-06162-8.

Coloman of Galicia House of Árpád Born: 1208 Died: May 1241
Regnal titles
| Preceded by Himself as Prince of Galicia | King of Galicia–Volhynia; 1215–1219 | Succeeded by Andrew |
| Preceded by Béla IV of Hungary | Duke of Slavonia; 1226–41 | Succeeded by Stephen V of Hungary |
