= Mór Wertner =

Hungarian historian

Mór Wertner (German: Moritz Wertner, Moriz Wertner; July 26, 1849, in Ispáca – June 8, 1921, in Párkány) was a Hungarian historian and genealogist.

== Publications ==
- Die Pest in Ungarn 1708–1777 (Leipzig, 1880)
- Orvosrégészeti tanulmányok (Budapest, 1883)
- Historisch-genealogische Irrthümer (Wien, 1884)
- Genealogie und Geschichte (Wien, 1884)
- A középkori délszláv uralkodók genealogiai története, nyomtatott a Csanád-Egyházmegyei Könyvsajtón (Temesvár, 1891)
- A magyar nemzetségek a XVI. sz. közepéig I-II (Temesvár, 1891)
- Az Árpádok családi története (Pleitz Ferencz Pál Könyvnyomdája, Nagy-Becskerek, 1892)
- Negyedik Béla király története (Temesvár, 1893)
- A Hunyadiak (Déva, 1900)
- Hunyadmegye legrégibb tisztikara (Déva, 1900)
- Névmagyarázatok I. Férfi és helységnevek (Budapest, 1916)
- Névmagyarázatok II. Régi magyar női nevek (Budapest, 1917)
