= Szolnok County =

County of the Kingdom of Hungary

Coordinates: 47°10′30″N 20°11′25″E

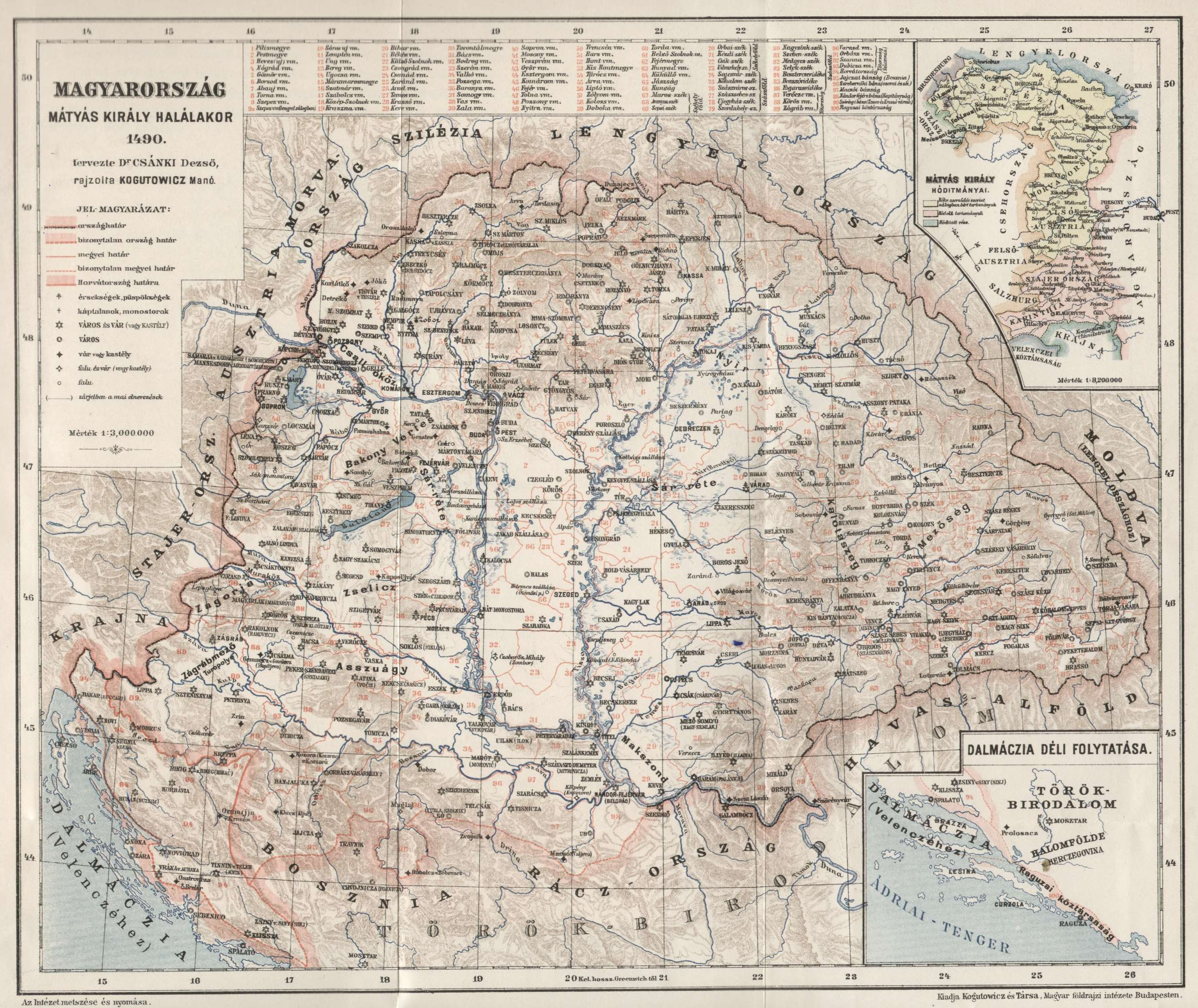
A map of the Hungarian Kingdom in 1490, after the death of Matthias Hunyadi.

Szolnok County (Hungarian: Szolnok vármegye, Latin: Comitatus Szolnokiensis, German: Comitat Szolnok, Szolnoker Comitat (modern spelling Komitat)) was a county in the Kingdom of Hungary between the 11th century and 1426. It was made up of two disconnected parts, one in what later became Transylvania and the Partium, the other around the Tisza centred on the settlement of Szolnok. The county was eventually split and became:

- Belső-Szolnok ('Inner Szolnok') in what became the Principality of Transylvania, which was merged into Szolnok-Doboka County in 1876.
- Közép-Szolnok ('Middle Szolnok') in what became the Partium, which was merged into Szilágy County in 1876.
- Külső-Szolnok ('Outer Szolnok') in central Hungary, which de facto merged with Heves County in 1569 due to the Ottoman occupation of Külső-Szolnok. Heves was also occupied in 1596, with both becoming part of Eğri Eyalet until their reconquest by the Habsburgs in 1687. The two counties merged de jure in 1765 to become Heves and Külső-Szolnok County.

A second iteration of Szolnok County, centred on the city of Szolnok and corresponding to the former Külső-Szolnok, was created in 1850 following the Revolutions of 1848 in the Austrian Empire. It was created out of the south-eastern part of Heves and Külső-Szolnok County, separated from the other half – Heves County – mostly by the Tisza. As of 1854 Szolnok comprised the Stuhlbezirke ('seat districts') of Tisza-Füred, Mező-Túr and Szolnok. It was part of the Pest-Ofen district, one of five districts of Hungary during this period. The 1850s changes to the counties were reversed in 1860, rendering this second Szolnok County defunct. Szolnok would again be separated from Heves in 1876, when it became part of Jász-Nagykun-Szolnok County, which also included the former Jászság and Nagykunság; Tisza-Füred however remained with Heves County until after World War II and the formation of the modern Jász-Nagykun-Szolnok County.
