= Báncsa (genus) =

Genus (gens) Báncsa
- Country: Kingdom of Hungary
- Founded: early 13th century
- Founder: Orbász I (?)
- Final ruler: Peter IV
- Dissolution: 1348
- Cadet branches: House of Dionís (?); House of Horvat

Báncsa or Bancsa (Latin: Bancha), also incorrectly Vancsa or Vancza, was the name of a gens (Latin for "clan"; nemzetség in Hungarian) in the Kingdom of Hungary.

== Origin ==
As one of the clans from Délvidék, the southern territories of the kingdom, the Báncsa was an original settler kindred from Bács County (today Bač, Serbia), which later was granted landholdings and villages in Northern Hungary, including Esztergom and Komárom Counties. Based on the given name Orbász (also Orbas or Vrbas), which was common within the family, it is possible that the clan was of Slavic (Serbian or Croatian) origin.

== Notable members ==
Orbász I (fl. 1213–16)

Being the earliest known member of the kindred, Orbász was first mentioned as comes in 1213, according to historian János Karácsonyi. It is plausible that he is identical with that certain Orbász, who served as ispán of Komárom County in 1216. He had died by 1252. He was buried in the lobby of the St. Adalbert Cathedral in Esztergom.

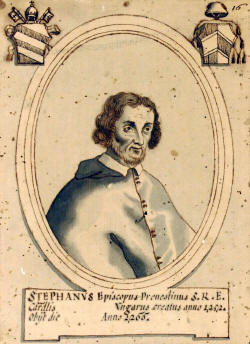
Stephen I Báncsa, the first Hungarian cardinal

Benedict I

Brother of Orbász I. His son was Lampert (fl. 1255), who sold the estate of Kürt in Esztergom County (today Strekov, Slovakia) to Pousa, dean in the Diocese of Nyitra. Benedict's another son was Denis II (fl. 1256–79), who successfully requested Pope Alexander IV the exemption of the St. Elizabeth church in Paloznak from the decanal jurisdiction in the next year (1256). Denis had a son Benedict II (fl. 1279–83). In 1279, they donated the land of Bálvány in Bars County to Denis' nephew, Farkas (his mother is unidentified). In 1283, Benedict II made a donation to the Convent of the Holy Cross Church in Esztergom. This branch became extinct by the last decade of the 13th century.

Denis I (fl. 1235–68)

Alleged son of Orbász I. Historian Dániel Bácsatyai claimed that knight Denis, who escorted Queen Violant of Hungary to the Kingdom of Aragon was the brother of Cardinal Stephen Báncsa. His son Charles was referred to as a nephew of the cardinal in 1264, then a son of "Count Denis of Hungary" in 1269, whom the historian identified with the Aragonese knight. This Denis was progenitor of the Dionís noble family, which possessed landholdings in the Iberian Peninsula.

Stephen I (fl. 1238–70)

Son of Orbász I. He was the most powerful member of the kindred. He served as Bishop of Vác from 1240 or 1241 to 1243, then Archbishop of Esztergom from 1242 until 1252. He was created as a cardinal by Pope Innocent IV in December 1251, becoming the first Hungarian prelate, who elevated to that dignity. Similar to his colleagues, Stephen Báncsa also had a household, called familia in Orvieto. His chancellery and court located there. Some of his relatives (nephews) were members of his household. Stephen died in Rome.

Vincent (fl. 1243–66)

Son of Orbász I. Also referred to as Bencenc (Latin: Bencentius), he served as ispán of Esztergom County around 1244. He married an unidentified daughter of nobleman Keled Kórógyi. He had two sons, Stephen II (see below) and Cletus (or Kilit, former historiographical works incorrectly called him Keled), who was mentioned by a sole source in 1278 (the brothers did not appear at a trial). Cletus married an unidentified daughter of Michael Rosd. They had no descendants.

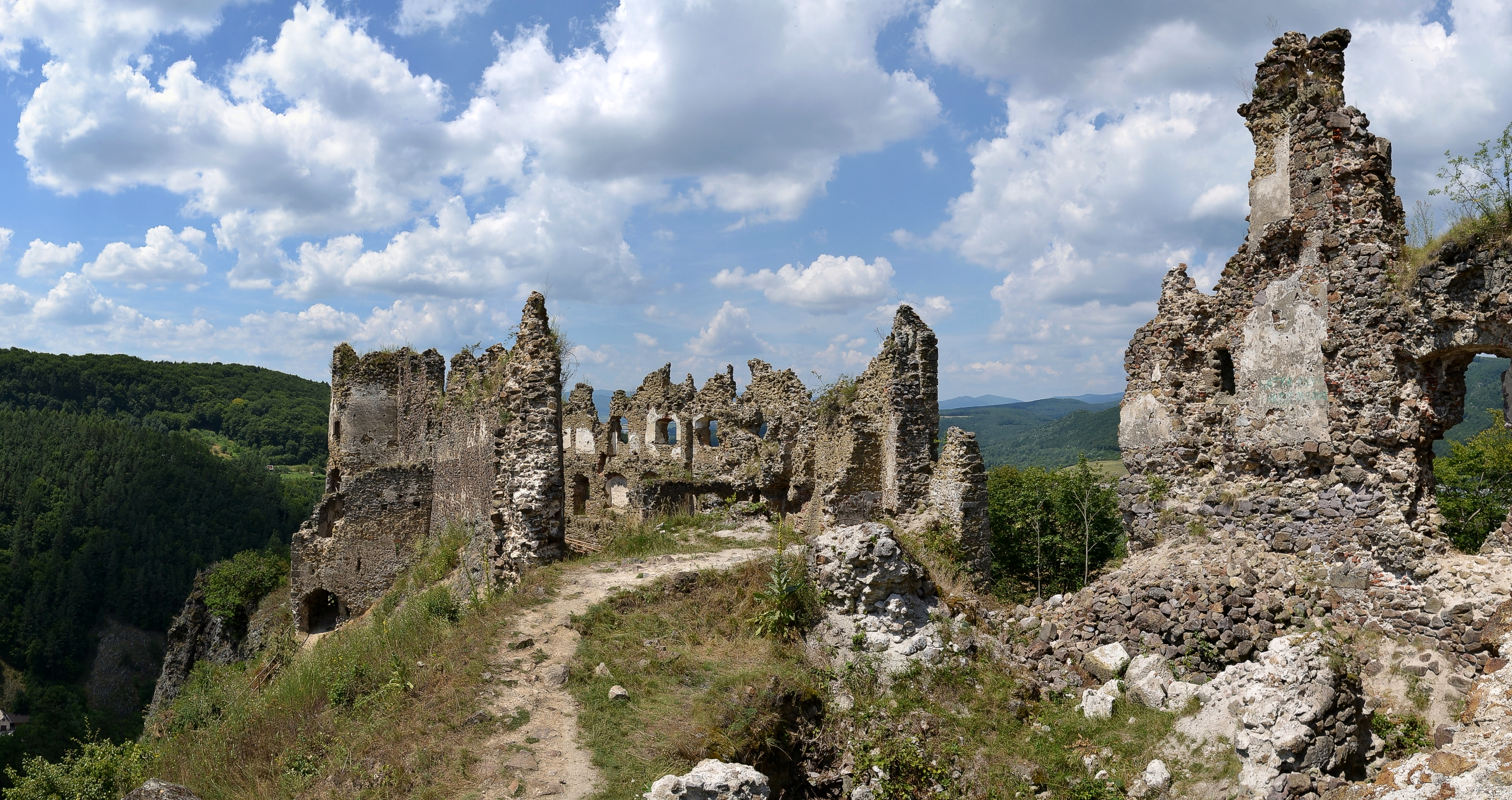
Saskő (Šášovský) Castle, today in Slovakia, built by the brothers Vincent and Peter I Báncsa sometime before 1253

Peter I (fl. 1253)

Son of Orbász I. In 1253, he and his brother Vincent together participated in the determination of borders of the land Apáti, which belonged to the Garamszentbenedek Abbey. The document refers to him as comes. Vincent and Peter built the Saskő Castle (today Šášovský hrad in Slovakia) along the river Garam (Hron) for the reason to become a taxing place and to protect the local highway from the outlaws (as part of the castle-buildings following the First Mongol invasion). In 1283, family members still owned Saskő. By 1321, it became a royal castle (it is plausible that Charles I acquired the fort from Matthew Csák, who ruled the whole Northwestern Hungary at the turn of the 13th and 14th centuries). Through his son Thomas I, Peter was the forefather of the Horvat family.

Stephen II (fl. 1263–78)

Son of Vincent. Under his uncle's guidance, he studied canon law in the University of Bologna. He was made canon of Fenton by cardinal Ottaviano degli Ubaldini. By 1263, he became Provost of Pressburg (today Bratislava, Slovakia). Returning home, he became a staunch supporter of Duke Stephen, and served as chancellor in the ducal (then royal) court. Stephen II was Archbishop of Kalocsa from 1266 to 1278.

Orbász II (fl. 1264–86)

Son of Peter I. Due to his uncle's intervention, he was the first Hungarian, who graduated from the University of Padua in 1264 and one of the earliest Hungarian clergymen, who obtained a doctorate from Roman law. He was provost of Požega and a canon in the Padua Cathedral in 1264. Returning home, he functioned as chancellor in the court of Queen Dowager Elizabeth (in 1280 and 1284–86).

Thomas I (fl. 1283–97)

Son of Peter I. He was called Thomas the Golden by 14th-century documents. He first appeared in contemporary sources in 1283, when he and his brother Orbász II sold the land of Farnad (today Farná, Slovakia) to the Archdiocese of Esztergom. His son, Thomas II attended the University of Bologna in 1270. In 1297, Thomas I and his son Paul (fl. 1297–1317) sold the estate of Zoch (near Manđelos in Valkó County) to their relative John, son of comes Aynard. Thomas died by 1299. In that year, Paul returned a land (Meze). Paul's only son was Peter IV (fl. 1348–58), the first member of the Horvat family (he was referred to as "magister Petrus filius Pauli de Horwaty" in 1348).

Charles (fl. 1264–70)

Son of Denis I. He was already a canon of Esztergom in March 1264, when Pope Urban IV appointed him a canon of Verona, upon the request of his uncle Cardinal Stephen Báncsa. He attended the University of Bologna in 1268. He was styled as provost of the collegiate chapter of Hájszentlőrinc in 1270.

Peter II (fl. 1268–75)

Son of Denis I. He was also called Lodomer, which double name perhaps indicates his extramarital origin. He attended the University of Bologna from 1268 to 1270, and belonged to the Spanish entourage of Pedro Laurencio, Bishop of Cuenca. He was a canon of the Girona Cathedral in January 1270. He died in this capacity on 24 January 1275.

John (fl. 1264–70)

Nephew of Stephen I, his parentage is uncertain. He is the only certainly known family member, who was a member of Cardinal Báncsa's household in Italy. On 1 January 1264, he was elected dean of Zala, replacing Timothy, who became Bishop of Zagreb. John also served as dean of Győr and cardinal chaplain for his uncle. He was last mentioned by Stephen Báncsa's last will and testament in 1270.

== Family tree ==
- N
  - Orbász I (fl. 1213–16)
    - (?) Denis I (fl. 1235–68, d. before 1272) ∞ Margarida de Cabrera
      - Amor
      - Gabriel
      - Charles (fl. 1264–70)
      - Elizabeth
      - Margaret
      - Peter II (Lodomer; fl. 1268–75)
      - Jordana
      - Gracia
    - Cardinal Stephen I (fl. 1238–70)
    - Vincent (Bencenc; fl. 1243–66), ∞ N Kórógyi
      - Stephen II (fl. 1263–78)
      - Cletus (fl. 1278), ∞ N Rosd
        - Peter III (fl. 1296)
    - Peter I (fl. 1253)
      - Orbász II (fl. 1264–86)
      - Thomas I ("the Golden"; 1283–97, d. before 1299)
        - Thomas II (fl. 1270)
        - magister Paul (fl. 1297–1317)
          - Peter IV → Peter Horvat (fl. 1348–58)
            - Descendants of the Horvat, then Hatvani family
        - a daughter? ∞ John Smaragd?
    - A possible son or daughter
      - (?) John (fl. 1264–70)
  - Benedict I (Beke)
    - Lampert (fl. 1255)
    - Denis II (fl. 1256–79)
      - Benedict II (Beke; fl. 1279–83)
    - a daughter
      - Farkas (fl. 1279)

== Sources ==
- Almási, Tibor; Koszta, László (1991). "Báncsa István bíboros (1205k.–1270). Életrajzi vázlat [Cardinal Stephen Báncsa (c. 1205–1270): A Biographical Sketch]". Acta Universitatis Szegediensis de Attila József nominatae. Acta Historica (in Hungarian). special issue. MTA-SZTE-MOL Magyar Medievisztikai Kutatócsoport: 9–17. ISSN 0324-6965.
- Bácsatyai, Dániel (2018). "Személyi összeköttetések a Curia Romana és a magyar egyház között a 13. század közepén. Pármai Albert és Báncsa István [Personal Relations between the Curia Romana and the Hungarian Church in the mid-13th Century. Albert of Parma and István Báncsa]". Történelmi Szemle (in Hungarian). 60 (2). Hungarian Academy of Sciences: 299–323. ISSN 0040-9634.
- Engel, Pál (1996). Magyarország világi archontológiája, 1301–1457, I. [Secular Archontology of Hungary, 1301–1457, Volume I] (in Hungarian). História, MTA Történettudományi Intézete. ISBN 963-8312-44-0.
- Karácsonyi, János (1901). A magyar nemzetségek a XIV. század közepéig. I. kötet [The Hungarian genera until the middle of the 14th century, Vol. 1] (in Hungarian). Hungarian Academy of Sciences.
- Kiss, Gergely (2015). Dél-Magyarországtól Itáliáig. Báncsa nembeli István (1205 k. – 1270) váci püspök, esztergomi érsek, az első magyarországi bíboros életpályája [From Southern Hungary to Italy: The Life and Career of Stephen from the Kindred Báncsa (c. 1205–1270), Bishop of Vác, Archbishop of Esztergom, the First Cardinal from Hungary] (in Hungarian). Kronosz Kiadó. ISBN 978-615-5497-63-6.
- Kiss, Gergely (2017). "Cardinal's familia as a Network in the 13th Century. A Case Study of Cardinal Stephen Báncsa's Family in the Mid-thirteenth Century]". Specimina Nova Pars Prima. Sectio Mediaevalis IX. University of Pécs. pp. 59–75.
- Markó, László (2006). A magyar állam főméltóságai Szent Istvántól napjainkig: Életrajzi Lexikon [Great Officers of State in Hungary from King Saint Stephen to Our Days: A Biographical Encyclopedia] (in Hungarian). Helikon Kiadó. ISBN 963-208-970-7.
- Zsoldos, Attila (2011). Magyarország világi archontológiája, 1000–1301 [Secular Archontology of Hungary, 1000–1301] (in Hungarian). História, MTA Történettudományi Intézete. ISBN 978-963-9627-38-3.
