= Orbász II Báncsa =

Orbász (II) Báncsa
- Provost of Požega
- Appointed: 1264
- Term ended: c. 1287
- Successor: Lawrence Nánabeszter

Personal details
- Died: c. 1288
- Parents: Peter Báncsa
- Education: University of Padua

Orbász (II) from the kindred Báncsa (Hungarian: Báncsa nembeli (II.) Orbász; died c. 1288) was a Hungarian clergyman in the 13th century. He was one of the first Hungarians, who obtained a doctorate of Roman law.

== Family ==
Orbász (or Vrbas) was born into the gens (clan) Báncsa, an original settler family from Bács County (today Bač, Serbia). He was one of the two sons of comes Peter (fl. 1253). His brother was Thomas, ancestor of the late 14th-century powerful Horvat (or Horváti) family through his only son Paul. His uncle was Stephen I Báncsa, Archbishop of Esztergom, who became the first Hungarian cardinal. Orbász also had several cousins, including Stephen II Báncsa, Archbishop of Kalocsa.

== Life ==
Under the guidance of his uncle, who was created cardinal by Pope Innocent IV in December 1251, Orbász and his other cousins had the opportunity to begin their ecclesiastical careers in Rome. The cardinal hired a Hungarian tutor, a certain cleric Matthias the Pecheneg (Latin: Mathias Bissenus) to educate his nephews. Orbász was the first Hungarian, who graduated from the University of Padua in 1264 and one of the earliest Hungarian clergymen, who obtained a doctorate from Roman law. He already served as provost of Požega in March 1264, when Pope Urban IV provided him a church position of canon in the Padua Cathedral, upon the request of his uncle Cardinal Stephen Báncsa. In the next month, Orbász was granted two churches (Holy Cross and St. Mary) in the Archdiocese of Esztergom for ecclesiastical benefices, replacing Gerardus de Parma, who died in office. Orbász also attended the University of Bologna from 1268 to 1270. He bought a complete version of Digest for 90 livres in 1269. Orbász returned to Hungary at the end of the 1270s.

Similarly to the other members of his kindred, Orbász could not profit his knowledge and talent in his country, as the relationship between Stephen Báncsa and King Béla IV was tense since the mid-1240s, for instance because of the sale of domestic ecclesiastical goods by Báncsa. This situation changed after the death of Béla in 1270, when his son Stephen V ascended the Hungarian throne. Orbász's cousin Stephen II was elected Archbishop of Kalocsa already in 1266, when Duke Stephen de facto ruled the eastern parts of the kingdom after the brief civil war with his father Béla IV. Orbász had less spectacular church career. While maintained his position of provost of Požega, he functioned as chancellor in the court of Stephen's widow, Queen Dowager Elizabeth (in 1280 and 1284–86). Elizabeth (at least de jure) governed the kingdom for his ten-year-old son, Ladislaus IV until 1277, but she lost all political influence by the time of Orbász's chancellery. Beside that, Orbász also bore the title of papal chaplain. Orbász and his brother Thomas exchanged their land of Farnad (today Farná, Slovakia) with Archbishop Lodomer for a portion in the lordship of Saskő (today Šášovský hrad in Slovakia) in 1283. Orbász was succeeded by Lawrence Nánabeszter as provost of Požega and chancellor in 1288, which makes it probable that Orbász died by then.

== Sources ==
- Almási, Tibor; Koszta, László (1991). "Báncsa István bíboros (1205k.–1270). Életrajzi vázlat [Cardinal Stephen Báncsa (c. 1205–1270): A Biographical Sketch]". Acta Universitatis Szegediensis de Attila József nominatae. Acta Historica (in Hungarian). special issue. MTA-SZTE-MOL Magyar Medievisztikai Kutatócsoport: 9–17. ISSN 0324-6965.
- Bácsatyai, Dániel (2018). "Személyi összeköttetések a Curia Romana és a magyar egyház között a 13. század közepén. Pármai Albert és Báncsa István [Personal Relations between the Curia Romana and the Hungarian Church in the mid-13th Century. Albert of Parma and István Báncsa]". Történelmi Szemle (in Hungarian). 60 (2). Hungarian Academy of Sciences: 299–323. ISSN 0040-9634.
- Kiss, Gergely (2015). Dél-Magyarországtól Itáliáig. Báncsa nembeli István (1205 k. – 1270) váci püspök, esztergomi érsek, az első magyarországi bíboros életpályája [From Southern Hungary to Italy: The Life and Career of Stephen from the Kindred Báncsa (c. 1205–1270), Bishop of Vác, Archbishop of Esztergom, the First Cardinal from Hungary] (in Hungarian). Kronosz Kiadó. ISBN 978-615-5497-63-6.
- Koszta, László (1991). "A pozsegai káptalan tagjai a XIV. század közepéig [The Members of the Chapter of Požega until the mid-14th Century]". Aetas (in Hungarian). 6 (3–4). AETAS Könyv- és Lapkiadó Egyesület: 40–58. ISSN 0237-7934.
- Zsoldos, Attila (2011). Magyarország világi archontológiája, 1000–1301 [Secular Archontology of Hungary, 1000–1301] (in Hungarian). História, MTA Történettudományi Intézete. ISBN 978-963-9627-38-3.
