= Vincent Báncsa =

Ispán of Esztergom
- Reign: 1244
- Predecessor: Subanus (?)
- Successor: Cosmas (?)
- Died: after 1266
- Noble family: gens Báncsa
- Spouse: N Kórógyi
- Issue: Stephen II; Cletus
- Father: Orbász I

Vincent from the kindred Báncsa (Hungarian: Báncsa nembeli Vince; died after 1266) was a Hungarian nobleman, who served as ispán of Esztergom County around 1244.

== Life ==
Vincent (also Bencenc; Latin: Bencentius) was born into the gens (clan) Báncsa, an original settler family from Bács County (today Bač, Serbia). His father was Orbász I, ispán of Komárom County in 1216. Vincent had at least two siblings: Stephen I, an influential prelate in the mid-13th century, who became the first Hungarian cardinal in history, and the kindred reached its peak under his guidance; Peter, ancestor of the Horváti family; and a possible another brother (Denis?) or sister, parent of Cardinal Báncsa's other mentioned cousins.

The name of Vincent first appeared in contemporary sources in October 1243, when the cathedral chapter of Pécs issued a document about a land contract of Orljavac (Orywa) in Požega County. It confirmed by a royal charter on 21 March 1244. In the latter document, Vincent was already mentioned as ispán of Esztergom County (he held the dignity at the same time, when his elder brother Stephen served as Archbishop of Esztergom). In 1253, Vincent and his brother Peter together participated in the determination of borders of the land Apáti, which belonged to the Garamszentbenedek Abbey. Vincent and Peter built the Saskő Castle (today Šášovský hrad in Slovakia) along the river Garam (Hron) for the reason to become a taxing place and to protect the local highway from the outlaws. Vincent was last mentioned by contemporary sources in 1266.

Vincent married an unidentified daughter of nobleman Keled Kórógyi. They had two sons. Stephen II studied in the court of his uncle, Cardinal Báncsa, and later became Archbishop of Kalocsa. Their second son was Cletus (or Kilit, former historiographical works incorrectly called him Keled), who was mentioned by a sole source in 1278. Cletus married an unidentified daughter of Michael Rosd. They had no descendants.

== Sources ==
- Kiss, Gergely (2015). Dél-Magyarországtól Itáliáig. Báncsa nembeli István (1205 k. – 1270) váci püspök, esztergomi érsek, az első magyarországi bíboros életpályája [From Southern Hungary to Italy: The Life and Career of Stephen from the Kindred Báncsa (c. 1205–1270), Bishop of Vác, Archbishop of Esztergom, the First Cardinal from Hungary] (in Hungarian). Kronosz Kiadó. ISBN 978-615-5497-63-6.
- Zsoldos, Attila (2011). Magyarország világi archontológiája, 1000–1301 [Secular Archontology of Hungary, 1000–1301] (in Hungarian). História, MTA Történettudományi Intézete. ISBN 978-963-9627-38-3.

Vincent Genus Báncsa Born: ? Died: after 1266
Political offices
Preceded by Subanus (?)	Ispán of Esztergom; 1244	Succeeded by Cosmas (?)
