= Stephen II Báncsa =

Archbishop of Kalocsa

Stephen (II) Báncsa
- Archbishop of Kalocsa
- See: Kalocsa
- Appointed: 1266
- Term ended: 1278
- Predecessor: Smaragd
- Successor: John Hont-Pázmány
- Other post: Provost of Pressburg

Personal details
- Born: c. 1240
- Died: 1278
- Parents: Vincent Báncsa; N Kórógyi

Stephen (II) from the kindred Báncsa (Hungarian: Báncsa nembeli (II.) István; died 1278) was a Hungarian prelate in the 13th century, who served as Archbishop of Kalocsa from 1266 until his death. He was a staunch supporter of Stephen V of Hungary.

== Early life ==
He was born around 1240 into the gens (clan) Báncsa, an original settler family from Bács County (today Bač, Serbia). He was one of the two sons of Vincent, who served as ispán of Esztergom County around 1244, and an unidentified daughter of nobleman Keled Kórógyi. His namesake uncle was Stephen Báncsa, Archbishop of Esztergom, who became the first Hungarian cardinal. Stephen II also had a brother Cletus, who is mentioned only once in 1278 and married an unidentified daughter of Michael Rosd.

Under the guidance of his uncle, who was created cardinal by Pope Innocent IV in December 1251, Stephen had the opportunity to begin his ecclesiastical career in Rome. The cardinal hired a Hungarian tutor, a certain cleric Matthias the Pecheneg (Latin: Mathias Bissenus) to educate his nephews, including Stephen and Orbász. Between around 1254 and 1261, during the pontificate of Pope Alexander IV, Báncsa was made canon of Fenton by cardinal Ottaviano degli Ubaldini, his uncle's ally within the Roman Curia. Meanwhile, Stephen had been a student in the University of Bologna, where he studied canon law. By 1263, he became Provost of Pressburg (today Bratislava, Slovakia) and papal chaplain.

In early 1263, the Cathedral Chapter of Zagreb nominated him bishop. His appointment was petitioned to the Roman Curia, where Pope Urban IV requested the opinion of Stephen's namesake uncle, Cardinal Báncsa. After consultations, Báncsa's nomination was refused confirmation on 24 September 1263, because he was under the minimum age for a bishop. Instead of him, the cardinal suggested the chamberlain of his household, Timothy to become the Bishop of Zagreb. In 1264, Báncsa received exemption from the age limit by Pope Urban, later also confirmed by his successor Pope Clement IV.

== Prelate ==
Smaragd of Kalocsa was murdered in mid-1265. Some members of the chapter elected Demetrius, archdeacon of Bars as their new archbishop. Demetrius was considered King Béla IV's loyal servant, who led a delegation to Rome to protest against Timothy's election in the same time, commissioned by the king. When Demetrius resided in Italy, other canons of the chapter elected Stephen Báncsa as archbishop, neglecting the previous procedure. The dispute was judged over by Pope Clement, who asked for evidences from both parties by 6 December 1266. As the representatives of Demetrius did not present before the Curia, Clement confirmed the election of Báncsa on 11 December 1266. However after the decision, Demetrius' envoys, provost James and canon Elias appeared in the Roman Curia to complain the confirmation, citing Báncsa's young age, "illiteracy" and the "unlawful method" of the election. Clement commissioned three cardinals, John of Toledo, Matteo Rosso Orsini and Guillaume de Bray to investigate the case, who found the charges regarding the allegations of his minor age against Báncsa was unfounded. In his judgment letter on 11 February 1267, Pope Clement explained Báncsa's erudition and science skills at length (mentioning his studies at Bologna) and maintained his decision. Historians Tibor Almási and László Koszta considered Báncsa's election to contest the pro-Béla Demetrius was due to the intervention of Duke Stephen, who ruled the eastern parts of the kingdom after the brief civil war with his father Béla IV. Formerly, the nephews of Cardinal Báncsa could not profit their knowledge and talent in Hungary, as the relationship between him and Béla IV was tense since the mid-1240s, for instance because of the sale of domestic ecclesiastical goods by Báncsa.

Stephen Báncsa became a staunch supporter of Duke Stephen after his appointment as archbishop. Stephen adopted the title of junior king in 1262. After their civil war, Béla and Stephen signed the peace treaty on 23 March 1266, which fixed the existing political situation and boundaries. Báncsa served as chancellor in Stephen's ducal court from 1266 until 1270, when the duke succeeded his father as King of Hungary, who died on 3 May, without difficulties. Following that, Báncsa functioned as chancellor in the royal court, holding the office until Stephen V's death in 1272. The hospes (foreigner) gold miners of Rimaszombat (today Rimavská Sobota, Slovakia), who belonged to the Archdiocese of Kalocsa, were granted privileges of free election of judges (i.e. community leaders), masses in their native languages and release from warfare by Báncsa in his 1268 and 1270 charters. When Stephen V and Ottokar II of Bohemia reached an agreement in Pressburg on 2 July 1271 after their brief war, Báncsa was among the signatories. Stephen stated in the document, if he breaks the treaty, archbishops Philip Türje and Stephen Báncsa will be given the mandate for excommunication.

The minor Ladislaus IV ascended the throne after his father's sudden death in August 1272. During his minority, the era of feudal anarchy emerged, when many groupings of barons fought against each other for supreme power. In addition, Philip Türje died on 18 December 1272, leading to the status of seven years of vacancy in the Archdiocese of Esztergom, when the feudal anarchy infiltrated into the church organization. Under such circumstances, Stephen Báncsa acted as de facto head of the Catholic Church in Hungary. However, Báncsa stayed away from the events and the secular affairs, which resulted the disintegration of the Church's unity in these chaotic years. Báncsa was invited by Pope Gregory X to participate in the Second Council of Lyon in 1274. The council drew up plans for a crusade to recover the Holy Land, and the pope ordered Báncsa to organize the armies in his towns on 26 September 1275, but he remained passive. When Peter Monoszló, Bishop of Transylvania intended to extend the bishopric's influence over the provostry of Szeben (today Sibiu, Romania) in 1277, he had to face with a widespread revolt among the Saxons. The rebellion spread quickly, the infuriated Saxons stormed into the newly built St. Michael's Cathedral, see of the diocese on 21 February, looted the treasury, desecrated the shrines and massacred there about 2,000 asylum seekers, including canons, archdeacons and other priests. The Saxons also scorched and burned churches in the surrounding countryside. Báncsa considered the revolt as "ethnically motivated" which was strengthened by the Saxons' "wistfulness for robbery". On 30 May, he summoned an ecclesiastic congregatio in Buda, where seven bishops participated, and excommunicated the Saxon rebels. The prelates also ordered them to pay reparations for their "devilish fury rampage". Báncsa was present, when Ladislaus IV held a "general assembly" for seven counties along the River Tisza in early summer of 1278. On 19 June, he accompanied the king to Csanád (present-day Cenad, Romania), when the rebellious Stephen Gutkeled swore loyalty. Stephen Báncsa died in that year.

== Sources ==
- Almási, Tibor; Koszta, László (1991). "Báncsa István bíboros (1205k.–1270). Életrajzi vázlat [Cardinal Stephen Báncsa (c. 1205–1270): A Biographical Sketch]". Acta Universitatis Szegediensis de Attila József nominatae. Acta Historica (in Hungarian). special issue. MTA-SZTE-MOL Magyar Medievisztikai Kutatócsoport: 9–17. ISSN 0324-6965.
- Kiss, Gergely (2015). Dél-Magyarországtól Itáliáig. Báncsa nembeli István (1205 k. – 1270) váci püspök, esztergomi érsek, az első magyarországi bíboros életpályája [From Southern Hungary to Italy: The Life and Career of Stephen from the Kindred Báncsa (c. 1205–1270), Bishop of Vác, Archbishop of Esztergom, the First Cardinal from Hungary] (in Hungarian). Kronosz Kiadó. ISBN 978-615-5497-63-6.
- Markó, László (2006). A magyar állam főméltóságai Szent Istvántól napjainkig: Életrajzi Lexikon [Great Officers of State in Hungary from King Saint Stephen to Our Days: A Biographical Encyclopedia] (in Hungarian). Helikon Kiadó. ISBN 963-547-085-1.
- Udvardy, József (1991). A kalocsai érsekek életrajza (1000–1526) [Biographies of Archbishops of Kalocsa, 1000–1526] (in Hungarian). Görres Gesellschaft.
- Zsoldos, Attila (2011). Magyarország világi archontológiája, 1000–1301 [Secular Archontology of Hungary, 1000–1301] (in Hungarian). História, MTA Történettudományi Intézete. ISBN 978-963-9627-38-3.

Stephen II Genus Báncsa Born: c. 1240 Died: 1278
Catholic Church titles
| Preceded by Smaragd | Archbishop of Kalocsa; 1266–1278 | Succeeded by John Hont-Pázmány |
Political offices
| Preceded by Nicholas Kán | Chancellor of the Junior King; 1266–1270 | Succeeded by Office abolished |
| Preceded by Philip Türje | Chancellor; 1270–1272 | Succeeded by Paul Balog |
