= Stephen I Báncsa =

Hungarian cardinal

His Eminence Stephen Báncsa
- Cardinal Bishop of Palestrina; Archbishop of Esztergom
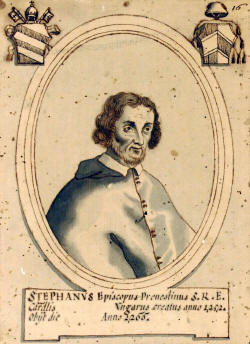
- Stephen Báncsa
- Province: Esztergom
- See: Esztergom
- Appointed: 14 August 1242
- Installed: 7 July 1243
- Term ended: 1252
- Predecessor: Matthias Rátót
- Successor: Benedict II
- Other post: Cardinal Bishop of Praeneste
- Previous post: Bishop of Vác (1241–1243)

Orders
- Created cardinal: December 1251 by Pope Innocent IV
- Rank: Cardinal-Bishop

Personal details
- Born: c. 1205
- Died: 9 July 1270 Rome
- Buried: Santa Balbina
- Denomination: Roman Catholic
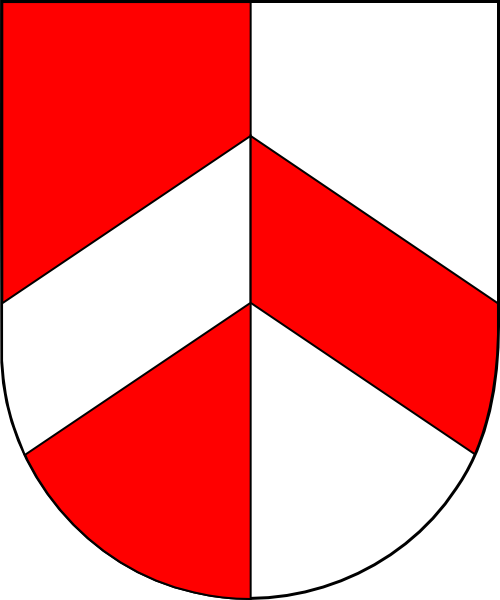
- Coat of arms

Stephen (I) Báncsa (Hungarian: Báncsa (I.) István, Latin: Stephanus de Bancha; died 9 July 1270) was the first Hungarian cardinal of the Roman Catholic Church. Prior to that, he served as Bishop of Vác from 1240 or 1241 to 1243, then Archbishop of Esztergom from 1242 until his creation as cardinal.

== Ancestry and family ==
He was born around 1205 as a descendant of the gens (clan) Báncsa, an original settler family from Bács County (today Bač, Serbia). His father was Orbász I (or Vrbas), who was mentioned as comes in 1213, according to historian János Karácsonyi. He was buried in the lobby of the St. Adalbert Cathedral in Esztergom. It is possible that he is identical with that certain Orbász, who served as ispán of Komárom County in 1216. Stephen mentioned his father only once in a charter of 1252, which narrates he was involved in a lawsuit in the early 1240s in the case of ownership right over the estate Urkuta against Györk Atyusz, son of Ban Atyusz III Atyusz. Accordingly, Stephen had established a mass-endowment for his late father's spiritual salvation and financed its operation from the income of Urkuta, while its lawfulness was denied by Györk and his patron Benedict, Archbishop of Kalocsa.

Stephen had at least two brothers: Vincent (Bencenc) was mentioned as ispán of Esztergom County in 1244 (same time, when Stephen functioned as archbishop), who married an unidentified daughter of Keled Kórógyi. Their two sons were Stephen II, also a royal chancellor and Archbishop of Kalocsa from 1266 to 1278, who entered ecclesiastical career under the influence of his uncle Cardinal Stephen Báncsa, and Cletus (fl. 1278), who married a daughter of Michael Rosd. Stephen and Vincent also had a younger brother Peter, who had two sons Orbász II, provost of Pozsega (today Požega, Croatia) then chancellor for Dowager Queen Elizabeth the Cuman. He was the first Hungarian to obtain a doctorate from the University of Padua (1264). Peter's other son was Thomas, ancestor of the late 14th-century powerful Horvat (or Horváti) family through his only son Paul. It is possible that Stephen also had another (unidentified) brother, who might be was the father of his two nephews, Carulus (canon of Veszprém, then Esztergom) and John (dean of Győr, Zala, then chaplain for Cardinal Báncsa). Historian Dániel Bácsatyai considered this brother is identical with that "Denis of Hungary", who escorted Queen Violant to the Kingdom of Aragon in 1235, where he became progenitor of the influential Dionisii noble family.

== Provost and chancellor ==
Báncsa first appeared in contemporary records as Provost of Bács and Chancellor of King Béla IV on 9 January 1238, when the king listed and confirmed the landholdings of the Order of Saint John in Hungary. Still in 1238, he appears in the same capacity in a charter of Palatine Denis Tomaj, when they jointly judged over a possession lawsuit between Bartholomew, Bishop of Veszprém and the Pannonhalma Abbey. Historians Tibor Almási and László Koszta consider that Báncsa was member of the collegiate chapter in Bács and became chancellor due to the intervention of his ecclesiastical superior Ugrin Csák, Archbishop of Kalocsa, who also served as chancellor during the reign of Béla's father Andrew II.

In the next year, Báncsa was transferred to Titel, where he functioned as provost too, from 1239 to 1240. He was a member of an ad hoc council summoned by Denis Tomaj to judge in the case of Sala church estate which had several jurisdictional conflicts over the years. The document is preserved by the abbey's Liber ruber. Báncsa is last mentioned as chancellor on 21 March 1240, when the Cistercians were granted patronage of four parishes in Burzenland (Barcaság), Transylvania. Two royal documents suggest that Báncsa presumably still held the court office during the Mongol invasion of Hungary in 1241, but their credibility is highly questionable.

== Prelate in Hungary ==
=== Bishop of Vác ===
After the death of Robert, Archbishop of Esztergom on 1 November 1239, Matthias Rátót, Bishop of Vác was elected as his successor in the same month, which was confirmed by Pope Gregory IX in March 1240. Báncsa's autobiographer Gergely Kiss argues that Báncsa was elevated to the position of Bishop of Vác in the same year to replace Rátót. However, in contemporary documents, he is first referred to bishop only in May 1241. According to Roger of Torre Maggiore's Carmen Miserabile, Báncsa and two companions (Albert, provost of Arad and an unidentified provost of Csanád) were entrusted by King Béla to escort his spouse Queen Maria Laskarina to the Austrian border, escaping from the growing Mongol threat. Thus, he was not present in the Battle of Mohi on 11 April 1241, when majority of the prelates, for instance Matthias Rátót and Ugrin Csák were killed in the battlefield. After their victory, the Mongols sacked and burned numerous towns, including Pest and Vác, Báncsa's episcopal see. The Mongol invasion and its consequences significantly contributed to Báncsa's rapid ascension within the church hierarchy. Béla's letter to Pope Gregory on 18 May 1241 suggests that Báncsa, who fled Austria for Italy, personally reported the tragic events in Rome. Emperor Frederick II's letter to Henry III of England (3 July 1241) confirmed that Báncsa, as Béla's envoy negotiated with Frederick in Faenza to seek assistance, before his departure to Rome. There Pope Gregory commissioned him to organize a crusade against the Mongols, but no reinforcements arrived from abroad. Pope Gregory soon died in August, while his successor Pope Celestine IV occupied the throne for only seventeen days before his sudden death. It was followed by one and a half year period of sede vacante, which prevented effective assistance to Hungary.

Returning home, Báncsa joined Béla's companion, who fled to Dalmatia, after a Mongol detachment chased him from town to town as far as Trogir on the coast of the Adriatic Sea. There Báncsa was elected as Archbishop of Esztergom in the spring of 1242, he was first mentioned in that capacity by Thomas of Split in his work Historia Salonitana. As archbishop-elect, Báncsa retained his post of Bishop of Vác too. While Béla returned to Hungary in May 1242, Báncsa remained in Klis with the royal family until his homecoming in September. The town of Vác was rebuilt and inhabited by German colonists under his direction.

=== Archbishop of Esztergom ===
Pope Innocent IV, elected on 25 June 1243, confirmed Báncsa's appointment as Archbishop of Esztergom, being transferred from the Diocese of Vác with the permission of the Roman Curia, granted on 7 July 1243. On 19 July 1243, Pope Innocent wrote a letter to Báncsa, appointing him Apostolic Legate in Croatia and Dalmatia. Accordingly, he was instructed to take action against the "growing heresy" in the province. However this document again refers to Báncsa as archbishop-elect, in addition to the charter of the Cathedral Chapter of Esztergom in August 1243, where Báncsa appears as procurator of the archdiocese. According to Gergely Kiss, this transitional status lasted until the first half of 1244.

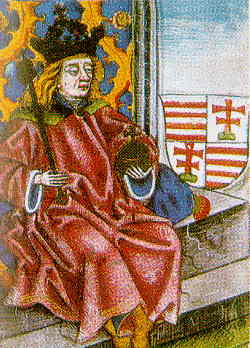
Béla IV of Hungary

After 1244, Stephen Báncsa sought to strengthen the authority of the Metropolitan Archdiocese over the chapters and monastic orders in Hungary. His most important mainstay was Pope Innocent in these endeavors. For instance, Albert, provost of Arad was forced to acknowledge the supremacy of Esztergom over his chapter in 1246. Pope Innocent ordered the monks of the Mount of Saint Martin (Pannonhalma) to promise obedience to the Archdiocese of Esztergom as their exarchate in 1247. When Béla confirmed the privileges of the hospes in Beregszász (today Berehove, Ukraine) in December 1247, the king assigned the jurisdiction of Esztergom to the Saxon community. The Premonstratensian provostry of Hatvan was also a subject of the archdiocese's spiritual jurisdiction. The acquired area was settled with colonists by Báncsa since the early 1240s. Báncsa expanded the archbishopric' landed property with purchases, exchanges and donations. He donated the tithe of wine production to the canons of the St. Adalbert Cathedral in 1244. Upon his request, Nicholas, custos of Esztergom and dean of Sasvár (today part of Šaštín-Stráže, Slovakia) and the Esztergom Chapter were granted the estates of Szőlő and Rendvég (belonged to Nógrád Castle) by Béla IV in 1248. Báncsa donated the land of Tyrna to the collegiate chapter in 1250.

Báncsa even represented the church's interests against the monarch, thus there relationship worsened since the mid-1240s. For instance, Béla filed a complaint that Zlaudus Ják was elected Bishop of Veszprém without his consent in 1245, which "contradicted the old customary law". Innocent instructed Benedict of Kalocsa to investigate the case in February 1245. According to his letter, Stephen Báncsa confirmed Zlaudus' election despite the king's opposition. Béla did not recognize the election and ignored Zlaudus in the royal council (his charters refer to the Diocese of Veszprém "in vacancy"). The conflict has been resolved by December 1245. Báncsa's growing influence in the Roman Curia was reflected by Pope Innocent's letter in February 1247, when ordered Báncsa and Benedict to ensure the strengthening of the castles and forts against a possible upcoming Mongol invasion. In March 1249, Béla donated the royal castle of Esztergom to the archdiocese. At Christmas 1248, Pope Innocent IV dispensed annually forty-day plenary indulgence to the Esztergom Cathedral due to the intercession of Báncsa, which further increased his influence. The chapter also received the "exemption of interdictum" at the end of 1247, which allowed the uninterrupted continuation of certain liturgical acts even in the case of excommunication.

During his ten-year primacy, Báncsa supported the spread of various religious orders in Hungary. In 1246, Eusebius asked Báncsa for permission to leave his profession to become a hermit. Conscious sacrifice led him to hermitage. He settled in a cave north of Pilisszántó. He placed a large wooden cross in front of the entrance of his cave where he prayed and did his contemplations. Four years later he is said to have been admonished in a vision to gather into community the other hermits living in the vicinity, for whom he built a monastery and church the ruins of which are near the village of Pilisszentlélek (today a part of Esztergom). In the same year Eusebius proposed and obtained affiliation with the Patach community under the rule prescribed by its founder, and was chosen superior. Eusebius received the approbation of Bartholomew, Bishop of Pécs, for the new Order, but the publication of the decrees of the Fourth Lateran Council at this time necessitated a journey to Rome to secure final authorization by the Holy See. This meant the establishment of the only Hungarian monastic order, the Order of Saint Paul the First Hermit. Under Innocent's direction, Báncsa played a role in ensuring the protection of the rights of Franciscans, Dominicans and the Knights Hospitaller. In addition, he organized the re-colonization of the depopulated monasteries throughout the kingdom, which suffered heavy human loss during the Mongol invasion.

As archbishop, Stephen sought to expand the possessions of the archdiocese of Esztergom. He bought Gúg (today a borough of Zemné, Slovakia) in 1245 and Vásárd (today Horné Trhovište, Slovakia) in 1248, both estates laid in Nyitra County. He bought portions in Hatvan (today Palotás) in Nógrád County from the gens (clan) Záh in 1250. Stephen also acquired the estates Csát in Tolna County (in the area where his personal landholdings were located) and Lucfalva in Nógrád County in 1251. Stephen exchanged the estate Szőny for Örs (parts of Komárno and Komárom, respectively) with Béla IV in 1249. In order to settle his debt, a local noble George handed over his estate in Nagyszombat (today Trnava, Slovakia) to the archbishopric in 1250. He unlawfully seized the estates Szalatna, Zellő és Verbenye in Nógrád County from local nobles. Following a personal lawsuit (see above), Benedict of Kalocsa (otherwise, his successor) donated the estate Úrkuta in Esztergom County to Stephen in 1251.

== Cardinal ==
=== Creation ===
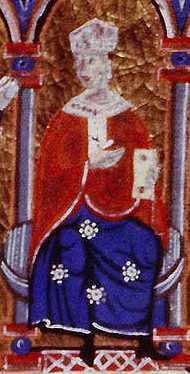
Pope Innocent IV at the First Council of Lyon (1245)

Báncsa was appointed Cardinal Bishop of Praeneste (Palestrina) by Pope Innocent IV in December 1251, becoming the first Hungarian cardinal. Innocent's motivations behind this step are unclear. According to historians Tibor Almási and László Koszta, Innocent was determined to increase the number of members of the Sacred College of Cardinals. Since the 11th-century customary canon law, the College consisted of 7 cardinal-bishops, 28 cardinal-priests and 18 cardinal-deacons. Despite this, the body had approximately only seven cardinals during Innocent's election in 1243. Its members were not interested in increasing their number because of the distribution of cardinal income, in addition the Curia's certain oligarchic tendencies during the reign of Pope Gregory IX and Emperor Frederick's influence over the board, who also captured cardinals and prelates to hinder the papacy's politics. There is an assumption that Báncsa was created as cardinal because of the continuous Mongol threat, as Báncsa could have been a proper representative of the case. This was at a time when the church was having problems with the Mongols, which became one of the five main issues of the First Council of Lyon in 1245. In contrast, Koszta and Almási argued that Báncsa would have been appointed as cardinal in this supposed case already on 28 May 1244, when Innocent created 12 cardinals to fill the number of the College. In fact, as they emphasized, the persecution of the Church by the Emperor Frederick overshadowed all other threats in Rome, including the danger of Mongol invasions against Europe. The two historians considered Báncsa's election was part of the 13th-century papal universalist politics, which tried to emphasize its cosmopolitan character. Gergely Kiss argues the low-number of filled cardinal positions hindered and hampered effective governmental activity. Báncsa's predecessor, Giacomo di Pecorari (otherwise a papal legate to Hungary in the 1230s) died on 25 June 1244, just one month after the first creation process of the cardinals during Innocent's papacy. When Báncsa was appointed cardinal in late 1251, out of the 42 churches, only 14 had cardinals. From 1244, the tensions were soon re-emerged between Rome and the Holy Roman Empire. Kiss considers Innocent could appoint new cardinals only after the death of Frederick II (December 1250), when the empire's influence temporarily reduced over the College. The historian argues it is possible that the aim of Báncsa's appointment was to win Hungary for a coalition against the Holy Roman Empire. Nevertheless, his creation could not influence the power proportions and political groupings of the Italian, French, Spanish and English cardinals. In addition to his ethnicity, Kiss assumes that his affinity to the hermit movements and his personal relationship with Innocent (born Sinibaldo Fieschi, formerly a clerk of Pope Gregory IX) could be reasons why he was chosen to become cardinal. Three prelates, Stephen Báncsa, Ottobuono de' Fieschi (future Pope Adrian V) and Giacomo da Castell'Arquato were created cardinals in the same time. Out of the seven suburbicarian dioceses in Rome, the Diocese of Palestrina was the fourth in the hierarchy existing between them.

After his creation as cardinal, Báncsa remained in the position of archbishop at least until 20 October 1252, when he is mentioned in that capacity for the last time. Thereafter, he temporarily left Hungary for Rome. Even so, upon his personal request, he continued to serve as Administrator of the Archdiocese of Esztergom (1252–1254), usurping its income of tithe from Csallóköz (today Žitný ostrov, Slovakia). Thus he was among the external cardinals. Since February 1253, he was an active participant in the papal governmental activity. He escorted Pope Innocent, when his court moved from Perugia to Anagni. In May, Báncsa was made papal legate to "Hungary and Slavonia" (i.e. Croatia) to mediate between Béla IV of Hungary and the newly ascended Ottokar II of Bohemia (but after he renewed his claim at Esztergom, Báncsa's task was transferred to papal confessor Velasco). According to his own document, Báncsa became ill, due to his being unaccustomed to the climate, among other reasons, and he therefore petitioned Pope Innocent IV to allow him to return to Hungary. Innocent and the cardinals were reluctant to lose him and his expertise, but Innocent granted him the privilege of returning to Esztergom, and continuing his administration of that diocese, until the next Feast of All Saints (1 November). At that point he was to resign the Church of Esztergom to a prelate of the Kingdom of Hungary of his choice, and return to the Papal Curia by Christmas 1253. If he did not return by that date, the bishopric of Palestrina was to be considered vacant, according to the pope's instruction.

Historians László Koszta and Tibor Almási considered that Báncsa wanted to return to Hungary because of financial difficulties, beside climatic inconveniences. Unlike the most cardinals, Báncsa did not belong to influential Italian families, who might have supported his aspirations and could not count on his national monarch's support, as Béla IV was outraged by the marginalization of the Mongol issue in the Roman Curia. Báncsa regarded his appointment of cardinal as an unpleasant and costly assignment, and tried to escape from the task. However, Báncsa's efforts in this direction failed. The Esztergom Chapter elected Chancellor Benedict as their archbishop. The election was acknowledged by King Béla, who otherwise criticized the method of choice, requested the pope to confirm it in a letter dated May 1253. Later, he repeated his request in October. Finally, the election of Benedict was confirmed by Pope Innocent on 25 February 1254. Benedict was advised, however, that during his Administratorship, he should not give away pensions or prebends without the express permission of the Holy See. As compensation, Stephen Báncsa was granted annual 300 silver denari from the archdiocese's income. Thus Báncsa was forced to return to Rome. He was already one of the signatories of a papal privilege document in May 1254, reflecting his retirement from the internal affairs of Hungary.

=== Role in the Roman Curia ===
Similar to his colleagues, Stephen Báncsa also had a household, called familia in Orvieto. His chancellery and court located there. Gergely Kiss identified 57 members of the household, composed of two parts: 39 clerics and 18 laymen. There are reliable information of their ethnicity only about half of them; twelve members were Hungarians, followed by Italians (seven), Spaniards (five) and Frenchmen (three). Majority of the monks in his household were Franciscans. He hired a tutor, by name a certain Matthias the Pecheneg for his nephews, who were also members of his cardinal household. The most prominent member of his familia was chaplain Andrew the Hungarian (Latin: Andreas Ungarus), who was styled Báncsa's "commensalis" (Dániel Bácsatyai identified him with the historian Andrew of Hungary). Other members were Bentivenga dei Bentivenghi, Abril Pérez Peláez, Bishop of Urgell, Pietro da Sant'Elia, Bishop of Aquino and Timothy, Bishop of Zagreb.

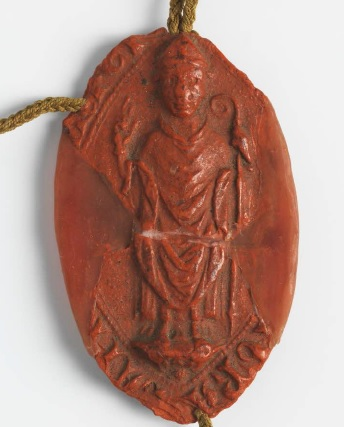
Seal of Cardinal Stephen Báncsa (1270)

Báncsa was present in the Roman Curia at Anagni and subscribed papal documents under Innocent IV, on 25 February 1253, 13 April 1253, 31 May 1253, 28 May 1254, 4 July 1254 and 22 July 1254. When Innocent IV moved south with the papal army to confront Manfred, the Sicilian Regent, he accompanied the Pope, leaving Anagni on 8 October, arriving at Montecassino on 13 October for a three-day rest, and finally reaching Naples on 27 October. The Pope died in Naples on 7 December, five days after the disastrous battle of Foggia in which the papal army was soundly defeated and lost over 4,000 men. Cardinal Báncsa participated in the very short papal election of 11–12 December 1254 (that elected Raynaldus de' Conti as Alexander IV). During the election process, there was a dispute among the cardinals regarding the political orientation of the papacy. Three of them, Hugh of Saint-Cher, Guglielmo Fieschi and Ottobuono de' Fieschi supported the maintenance of the late Innocent's active foreign policy in the Holy Roman Empire and the Italian Peninsula (especially against Conradin), while John of Toledo, Ottaviano degli Ubaldini, Rinaldo di Jenne (the elected Pope Alexander IV) and Gil Torres opposed it. Alongside Jacobus de Porta, Riccardo Annibaldi and Giovanni Gaetano Orsini (future Pope Nicholas III), Stephen Báncsa represented a neutral stance. Báncsa subscribed regularly throughout the reign of Alexander IV as a member of the Pope's closest group of advisors. During his time in Naples, Cardinal Báncsa served as papal Auditor in the case of Bishop Ponce of Urgel; on 15 December 1254, he confirmed the sentence against Ponce for simony, incest, and other charges, and suspended Ponce; the sentence was confirmed by Alexander IV on 7 January 1255. In the same year, Báncsa was a member of that papal committee, which investigated the work of Franciscan friar Gerardo of Borgo San Donnino, who, in 1250, published his book entitled Introductorium in Evangelium Aeternum, which represented Joachimite idea. The commission ordered the destruction of the book.

The Curia remained at Naples until the first week of June 1255, and then returned to Anagni. In September 1255, Báncsa again served as Auditor for the first time, when collected all necessary documents for the filling dispute of the income of the Chapter of Compostela. In February 1256, he also judged in the lawsuit between Iring von Reinstein-Homburg, Bishop of Würzburg and Heinrich of Leiningen, Bishop of Speyer, when the latter contested Iring's legitimacy and claimed the bishopric for himself. However, Báncsa was not successful, as his trial delayed, thus Pope Alexander took the case from him and entrusted three other cardinals to make a judgment. The Curia did not take up residence in Rome until mid-November, there to remain until 1 June 1256, when they returned to Anagni. Throughout his activity, Báncsa remained passive in the political and seculars affairs which connected Rome to the Holy Roman Empire and the other kingdoms. Instead, he was involved in internal ecclesiastical and canon law cases, but he appeared as only signatory in the majority of the documents, where he was mentioned.

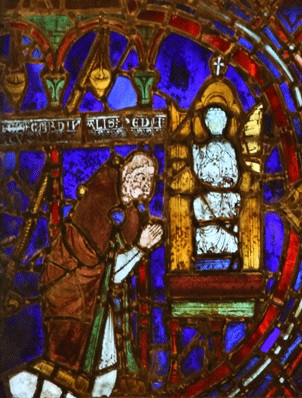
Fernand de Mély considered that this portrayal in one of the stained glass windows of the Chartres Cathedral depicts Báncsa as donator. However, Yves Delaporte argued it depicts Étienne Chardonnel, canon of Paris

On 3 July 1260, at Anagni, he and seven other cardinals signed a Decree for Alexander IV, regulating the Greek and Latin dioceses on the island of Cyprus. On 1 April 1261 Cardinal Báncsa, along with Cardinals Odo of Châteauroux, John of Toledo, Hugh of Saint-Cher, and Ottobono Fieschi, signed a constitution of Alexander IV in favor of the convent of Val-de-Grace in the diocese of Konstanz. The document was signed at the Lateran Palace in Rome.

Báncsa did not attend the papal election of 26 May – 29 August 1261 (Urban IV), according to Salvador Miranda. He was present, however, according to Wilhelm Sievert. According to Gergely Kiss too, Báncsa was among the eight cardinal electors, who participated in the event. On 23 January 1262, at Viterbo, less than five months after the Election, Cardinal Báncsa participated with eleven other (including newly appointed) cardinals in signing a Bull to the benefit of the Teutonic Knights. The evidence, tentative as it is, tends to favor Sievert. According to Agostino Paravicini Bagliani, Báncsa served as cardinal protector of the Franciscans from 1261 to 1265, which office was retained by the popes for themselves before that. Accordingly, Báncsa also represented the interests of the Poor Clares, the female wing of the Franciscan Order in the Roman Curia. In contrast, Kiss pointed out that there is no contemporary report that Báncsa had ever held that office. As Philippus de Perusio's Epistola de cardinalibus protectoribus ordinis fratrum Minorum narrates that, in fact, Giovanni Gaetano Orsini was appointed protector of the Franciscan Order in 1263. At this time, the Clarisses requested Pope Urban to nominee a separate protector for them. Báncsa briefly took this position and sought to restore the Franciscans's supervision over the nuns. Then Orsini reunited the two offices. In July 1263, Báncsa negotiated in "Alamannia" (i.e. Germany) on behalf of Pope Urban IV, presumably in ambassadorial (legate) capacity. In the following month in Hungary, Báncsa and his chaplain Velasco aimed to create a compromise between Béla and his rebellious son Duke Stephen.

Nevertheless, Báncsa's relationship with the Hungarian monarch remained tense. In early 1263, the Cathedral Chapter of Zagreb nominated the cardinal's namesake nephew as bishop. His appointment was petitioned to the Roman Curia, where Pope Urban IV requested the opinion of Cardinal Báncsa. After consultations, the nomination of Stephen Báncsa the Younger was refused confirmation on 24 September 1263, because he was under the minimum age for a bishop. Instead of him, the cardinal suggested his chamberlain Timothy to become the Bishop of Zagreb. Timothy was elected by some members of the chapter in the same month, but other canons denied the legality of the election. Béla protested against the pope's decision, referring to Timothy's "incapability to become a royal advisor" (possibly because of his close relationship with the cardinal, who had several conflicts with the king prior that). Béla was angered by the fact too that Pope Urban allowed to Cardinal Báncsa to be free to distribute Timothy's benefices in Hungary among his nephews and other relatives. Béla even sent two royal delegations to Rome in 1265 and 1266 to attempt to invalidate the papal confirmation. After the failure, Béla had to abandoned the case and acknowledged Timothy's election. In the latter year, Báncsa the Younger was elected Archbishop of Kalocsa by pro-Duke Stephen members of the chapter, neglecting the previous procedure, when the body elected Béla's candidate. Formerly, the nephews of Cardinal Báncsa could not profit their knowledge and talent in Hungary, as the relationship between him and Béla IV was tense since the mid-1240s, for instance because of the sale of domestic ecclesiastical goods by Báncsa. His family became staunch supporters of Duke Stephen, who adopted the title of junior king in 1262 and ruled the eastern parts of the kingdom de facto independently.

Cardinal Báncsa was present for the papal election of October 1264 – 5 February 1265 (that elected Clement IV). On February 26, at Perugia, only three weeks after the Election and three days after the Coronation, he and fifteen other cardinals subscribed a bull, Olim regno, notifying Henry of England and his son Edmund that they were not the true possessors of the Kingdom of Sicily. Since 1265 or 1266, Báncsa became cardinal protector of the Order of Monte Vergine (or Benedictine Williamites). In this capacity, he was responsible to persuade the hermit order to re-join the Grand Union of 1256; Alexander IV called together various other hermit groups from around the world and ultimately joined them to this existing Augustinian Order. On 22 August 1256 the Italian Williamites, unhappy with the arrangement of the Grand Union, left the Order and adopted the Rule of St. Benedict. In August 1266, Báncsa made a compromise with Riccardo Annibaldi, cardinal protector of the Augustinians; the Italian (Benedictine) Williamites could retain their independence and several monasteries in the (arch)dioceses of Mainz, Konstanz, Regensburg and Prague were returned to them, while other churches of the Williamites in Germany and Hungary remained under Augustinian supremacy.

Báncsa was working in Viterbo in the Curia in 1268. On 28 March 1268 he is attested as having judged a case in favor of the Lateran Basilica. The Cardinal also participated in the Election of November 1268 – 1 September 1271, the longest papal election in history, during which he died, purportedly on 9 July 1270. In the Spring of 1270, Cardinal Báncsa, Cardinal Ottobono Fieschi, and other prelates wrote to the General Chapter of the Order of Preachers, which was meeting in Milan, thanking them for their services to the Church. Due to his advanced age, Báncsa gradually retired from papal governance and public life after 1268, staying away from the political intrigues in the conclave.

== Death ==
Based on a record in the last pages of a manuscript of his own, a copy of Peter Lombard's Libri Quattuor Sententiarum, preserved by the Bibliothèque nationale de France, Stephen Báncsa was feverish and fell ill in the first day of July 1270. He made his last will and testament on 5 July 1270. Báncsa died four days later, on 9 July 1270. The annals of the Santo Spirito in Sassia incorrectly dated his death to 10 July. The 1271 general assembly of the Dominicans in Montpellier also commemorated his death. In his last testament, Báncsa donated his liturgical garments, objects and codices to churches and individuals. The two executioners of his last will were canonist Henry of Segusio and Giovanni Gaetano Orsini (elected Pope Nicholas III in 1277), which reflected his social appreciation in the Curia. He was buried in the basilica of Santa Balbina in Rome (today it is the titular church of Hungarian cardinal Péter Erdő).

This date of death is according to the sources consulted (as cited by Salvador Miranda). However, J. P. Adams quotes a document from the Vatican Archives that shows that Cardinal Stephen subscribed a letter dated 22 August 1270, and therefore could not have died on 9 July. He did not participate, however, in the election of the compromise committee or the final vote on 1 September 1271, thus Adams argues that if he died on 9 July, then it was in 1271.

== In arts ==
19th-century French art historian Fernand de Mély proposed in his study Le cardinal Étienne de Vancza, archevêque de Strigonie. Son portrait à la cathedrale de Chartres (1889), that one of the stained glass windows of the Notre-Dame du Pilier chapel in the Chartres Cathedral, which presents scenes from the life of Saint Nicholas, depicts the prayer Stephen Báncsa as donator of the window with the following subscript: STEPH[ANUS] CARDINALIS DEDIT [H]A[N]C VITREA[M]. The Hungarian historiography took over Mély's theory, which based on a fact that Báncsa and Villard de Honnecourt knew each other. However, Yves Delaporte proved in 1926 (Les vitraux de la cathédrale de Chartres) that the portrayal, actually, depicts Étienne Chardonnel, canon of Paris and the presumable donator of that window.

== Sources ==
- Almási, Tibor; Koszta, László (1991). "Báncsa István bíboros (1205k.–1270). Életrajzi vázlat [Cardinal Stephen Báncsa (c. 1205–1270): A Biographical Sketch]". Acta Universitatis Szegediensis de Attila József nominatae. Acta Historica (in Hungarian). special issue. MTA-SZTE-MOL Magyar Medievisztikai Kutatócsoport: 9–17. ISSN 0324-6965.
- Bácsatyai, Dániel (2018). "Személyi összeköttetések a Curia Romana és a magyar egyház között a 13. század közepén. Pármai Albert és Báncsa István [Personal Relations between the Curia Romana and the Hungarian Church in the mid-13th Century. Albert of Parma and István Báncsa]". Történelmi Szemle (in Hungarian). 60 (2). Hungarian Academy of Sciences: 299–323. ISSN 0040-9634.
- Galla, Ferenc (1970). "A váci egyházmegye püspökei [The Bishops of the Diocese of Vác]". In Bánk, József (ed.). Váci egyházmegyei almanach Szent István millénium évében (in Hungarian). Roman Catholic Diocese of Vác. pp. 103–201.
- Kis, Péter (2000). "Az esztergomi érsekek uradalomszervezése a XIII. század második felében [The Organization of Lordships by the Archbishops of Esztergom in the Second Half of the 13th Century]". In Piti, Ferenc; Szabados, György (eds.). "Magyaroknak eleiről". Ünnepi tanulmányok a hatvan esztendős Makk Ferenc tiszteletére (in Hungarian). Szegedi Középkorász Műhely. pp. 225–248. ISBN 963-482-500-1.
- Kiss, Gergely (2015). Dél-Magyarországtól Itáliáig. Báncsa nembeli István (1205 k. – 1270) váci püspök, esztergomi érsek, az első magyarországi bíboros életpályája [From Southern Hungary to Italy: The Life and Career of Stephen from the Kindred Báncsa (c. 1205–1270), Bishop of Vác, Archbishop of Esztergom, the First Cardinal from Hungary] (in Hungarian). Kronosz Kiadó. ISBN 978-615-5497-63-6.
- Kiss, Gergely (2017). "Cardinal's familia as a Network in the 13th Century. A Case Study of Cardinal Stephen Báncsa's Family in the Mid-thirteenth Century". Specimina Nova Pars Prima. Sectio Mediaevalis IX. University of Pécs. pp. 59–75.
- Kiss, Gergely (2019a). "Báncsa nb. István prenestei püspök-bíboros mint protector ordinis [Cardinal-Bishop Stephen Báncsa of Praeneste as Protector Ordinis]". In Fedeles, Tamás; Hunyadi, Zsolt (eds.). Szent Márton és Benedek nyomában. Tanulmányok Koszta László tiszteletére (in Hungarian). FIKP "Magyarország a középkori Európában" kutatócsoport. pp. 266–278. ISBN 978-963-306-709-3.
- Kiss, Gergely (2019b). "Családi kör? A bíborosi família kutatásának módszertani kérdései az első magyar bíboros, Báncsa István példáján keresztül [Family Circle? Methodological Issues of the Research of the Cardinal's Familia through the Example of the First Hungarian Cardinal, Stephen Báncsa]". In Lengvári, István; Pilkhoffer, Mónika; Vonyó, József (eds.). Az ember helye – a hely embere. Emberközpontú történetírás ‒ helytörténeti kutatás (in Hungarian). Hungarian Historical Society – Kronosz Kiadó. pp. 119–142. ISBN 978-615-6048-41-7.
- Markó, László (2006). A magyar állam főméltóságai Szent Istvántól napjainkig: Életrajzi Lexikon [Great Officers of State in Hungary from King Saint Stephen to Our Days: A Biographical Encyclopedia] (in Hungarian). Helikon Kiadó. ISBN 963-208-970-7.
- Varga, Lajos (2003). "Báncsa nembeli I. István [Stephen I from the kindred Báncsa]". In Beke, Margit (ed.). Esztergomi érsekek 1001–2003 [Archbishops of Esztergom 1001–2003] (in Hungarian). Szent István Társulat. pp. 106–111. ISBN 963-361-472-4.
- Zsoldos, Attila (2011). Magyarország világi archontológiája, 1000–1301 [Secular Archontology of Hungary, 1000–1301] (in Hungarian). História, MTA Történettudományi Intézete. ISBN 978-963-9627-38-3.

Stephen I Genus Báncsa Born: c. 1205 Died: 9 July 1270
Political offices
Preceded by Matthias Rátót	Chancellor; 1238–1240	Succeeded by Benedict
Catholic Church titles
Preceded by Matthias Rátót	Bishop of Vác; 1240/1–1243	Succeeded by Heimo
Preceded by Matthias Rátót	Archbishop of Esztergom; 1242–1252	Succeeded by Benedict
Preceded by Giacomo Pecoraria	Cardinal-bishop of Palestrina; 1251–1270	Succeeded by Vicedomino de Vicedominis
