= Benedict II =

Benedict II may refer to:

- Benedict II (archbishop of Esztergom) (died after 1261)
- Pope Benedict II (died 685), Pope of the Catholic Church
