= Orbász I Báncsa =

Orbász (I) Báncsa

Ispán of Komárom
- Reign: 1216
- Predecessor: Nicholas Csák
- Successor: Alexander
- Buried: Esztergom
- Noble family: gens Báncsa
- Issue: Denis I (?); Stephen I Vincent; Peter I unidentified

Orbász (I) from the kindred Báncsa (Hungarian: Báncsa nembeli (I.) Orbász) was a Hungarian nobleman, who served as ispán of Komárom County around 1216. He was the earliest known ancestor of the late 14th-century powerful Horvat (or Horváti) family.

== Life ==
Orbász (also Orbas or Vrbas) was born into the gens (clan) Báncsa, an original settler family from Bács County (today Bač, Serbia). He had a brother Benedict (or Beke). Their parents are unidentified, thus Orbász and Benedict were the first known members of the kindred. Orbász had three or four children from his unidentified marriage. The eldest one was Stephen I, an influential prelate in the mid-13th century, who became the first Hungarian cardinal in history, and the kindred reached its peak under his guidance. Vincent held the office of ispán of Esztergom County in 1244 (in the same time, when his elder brother Stephen served as Archbishop of Esztergom). Through Orbász's youngest son Peter I, the kindred continued to exist in Hungary. The Horvátis, who became infamous during the last stage of the Angevin period, descended from his branch. It is possible Orbász had a fourth, unidentified child, parent of Cardinal Báncsa's other mentioned cousins.

The earlier Hungarian historiography, based on genealogist János Karácsonyi's notice, considered that Orbász was first mentioned by contemporary records as a comes in 1213. It is plausible that he is identical with that certain Orbász, who served as ispán of Komárom County in 1216. Cardinal Stephen mentioned his father only once in a charter of 1252, which narrates he was involved in a lawsuit in early 1240s in the case of ownership right over the estate Urkuta against Györk Atyusz, son of Ban Atyusz III Atyusz. Accordingly, Stephen had established a mass-endowment for his late father's spiritual salvation and financed its operation from the income of Urkuta. Orbász was buried in the lobby of the St. Adalbert Cathedral in Esztergom.

== Sources ==
- Kiss, Gergely (2015). Dél-Magyarországtól Itáliáig. Báncsa nembeli István (1205 k. – 1270) váci püspök, esztergomi érsek, az első magyarországi bíboros életpályája [From Southern Hungary to Italy: The Life and Career of Stephen from the Kindred Báncsa (c. 1205–1270), Bishop of Vác, Archbishop of Esztergom, the First Cardinal from Hungary] (in Hungarian). Kronosz Kiadó. ISBN 978-615-5497-63-6.
- Zsoldos, Attila (2011). Magyarország világi archontológiája, 1000–1301 [Secular Archontology of Hungary, 1000–1301] (in Hungarian). História, MTA Történettudományi Intézete. ISBN 978-963-9627-38-3.

Orbász I Genus Báncsa Born: ? Died: ?
Political offices
Preceded by Nicholas Csák	Ispán of Komárom; 1216	Succeeded by Alexander
