= Denis of Hungary =

Hungarian-born 13th century Aragonese knight and nobleman

Denis
- Comes de Cepeз

Lord of Canals and Crespins
- Reign: 1249–1268/72
- Predecessor: creation
- Successor: Amor Dionís
- Born: c. 1210
- Died: 1268/72
- Noble family: Hungary: Ampud's kinship or gens Báncsa (?); Aragon: Dionís (Dionisii)
- Spouse: Margarida de Cabrera
- Issue: Amor; Gabriel; Gracia; Charles; Elizabeth; Margaret; Peter (Lodomer); Jordana
- Father: Denis, son of Ampud or Orbász Báncsa (?)

Denis of Hungary (Latin: Dionisius de Ungaria, Hungarian: Magyarországi Dénes, Aragonese: Dionís d'Hongría, Catalan: Dionís d'Hongria, Spanish: Dionisio de Hungría; c. 1210 – 1268/72), was a Hungarian-born Aragonese knight and nobleman in the 13th century. Born into a prominent family in the Kingdom of Hungary, he escorted Queen Violant of Hungary to the Kingdom of Aragon in 1235, where he settled down and faithfully served James I of Aragon during the Reconquista. Integrating into the local elite, Denis was the eponymous ancestor of the prominent Dionís (Dionisii) noble family. In Canals, Valencia, a street is named after him.

== Theories of origin ==
Hungarian genealogist Mór Wertner was the first scholar in the late 19th century, who connected "Denis of Hungary" with the prominent lord Denis, son of Ampud, who was responsible for the economy policy and acted as key architect of the large-scale financial reforms during the reign of Andrew II of Hungary. He identified them with each other. According to Wertner, after Andrew's son and main opponent, Béla IV ascended the Hungarian throne in 1235, Denis, who fell out of favor in the royal court, escorted his "relative" Violant (also Yolanda), Andrew's youngest daughter, to the Kingdom of Aragon in 1235, where she became the queen consort of King James I of Aragon.

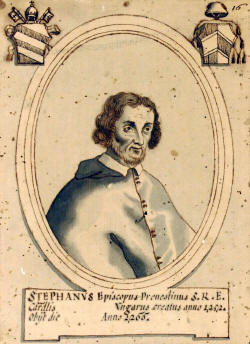
According to a scholar theory, Cardinal Stephen Báncsa was the brother of the Hungarian–Aragonese knight Denis

However, according to the contemporaneous Roger of Torre Maggiore's Carmen Miserabile, Denis, son of Ampud was blinded by Béla IV immediately after his coronation, and he died in captivity in the next year. That Denis, who served the Aragonese royal couple, was alive even in 1268, which is also made impossible to identify him with Denis, son of Ampud. Therefore, historian Szabolcs de Vajay claimed Denis had a namesake son, who served as ispán of Szepes County, possibly sometime between 1231 and 1234 or 1235, like previously his father (based on the inscription on the tombstone of his daughter Elizabeth, where Denis was styled as "comes de Cepeз"), who was the first known office-holder of that dignity in Hungary. Vajay refused the former identification efforts of "Cepeз" with the Csepel Island, a major royal residence and hunting forest. Accordingly he expatriated to Aragon with his queen in 1235, and after his father became a victim of King Béla's political purges, there was no hope for him to return to Hungary. This "Comes Dionysius" was referred to as Queen Violant's relative (Latin: affinis domne regine) in contemporary Aragonese documents. His alleged father Denis, son of Ampud was indeed a relative of the Hungarian royal family: he was a son of Ampud II and an unidentified daughter of Count Berthold III of Andechs, Margrave of Istria. Through the maternal lineage, Denis was the first cousin of Gertrude of Merania, a daughter of Berthold IV and the first spouse of Andrew II of Hungary. Although Violant was born from the second marriage of Andrew (her mother was Yolanda of Courtenay), thus there was no blood relationship between the queen and Denis of Hungary according to this theory, but the knight clearly belonged to a wider kinship of the royal family. Hungarian and Catalan historiography overall accepted Vajay's theory.

In his 2018 study, Hungarian historian Dániel Bácsatyai disputed the above identification based on archival research. A certain cleric Charles, who attended the University of Bologna, was referred to as a nephew of Cardinal Stephen Báncsa in 1264, then a son of "Count Denis of Hungary" in 1269. Consequently, Bácsatyai considered this Denis belonged to the gens (clan) Báncsa and was not related to Denis, son of Ampud. Accordingly, Denis was the brother of Cardinal Stephen Báncsa and was also a son of Orbász Báncsa. Bácsatyai argued the inscription on the tombstone of his daughter Elizabeth, where Denis was styled as "comes de Cepeз" is not necessarily identifiable with Szepes County. He also claimed the mention of kinship relations between Violant and Denis first appear only in the works of 16th-century historian Jerónimo Zurita y Castro. Historian Gergely Kiss, who had previously written the biography of Cardinal Báncsa, accepted Bácsatyai's argument. Kiss analyzed the composition of Báncsa's household (familia) in the Roman Curia, and observed an unusually large proportion of clergy of Spanish nationality, which is due in part to the fraternal relationship with Denis, according to the historian.

== Career in Aragon ==
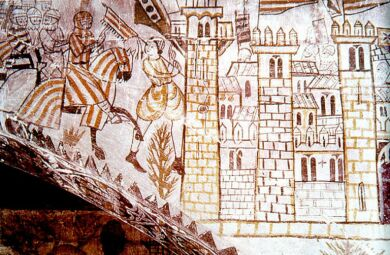
King James I entered the city of Valencia on 9 October 1238

The wedding of James I and Violant took place in the Saint Eulalia Cathedral in Barcelona on 8 September 1235. Vajay considered Denis was entrusted by the elderly king Andrew II shortly before his death to escort and protect his youngest daughter in the Iberian Peninsula. Denis is appeared as leader of that Hungarian contingent, consisted of knights and young nobles, which escorted the queen to the Kingdom of Aragon. According to the records of the Llibre del Repartiment, several Hungarian knights served faithfully the royal couple beside "Count Denis", including certain Andreas Ungarus, Martinus Ungarus, R. Dungria, Johannes de Ongría, Egidius de Hungaria, Jacobus de Pilis and Simon de Stregonia [Esztergom], who all belonged to the queenly court.

Queen Violant had an important political role and was one of the most valuable advisors of the king, on whom she had a strong influence. Shortly after the wedding, James I granted fiefdoms in "Beo" and "Ayn" to Denis. Historians identified these lands with Alcudia de Veo and Aín (present-day in the Province of Castellón) which laid on the northern slope of the Serra d'Espadà, and both lordships functioned as the king's preparations for the war along the borders of Aragon and Valencia. Denis and the other Hungarian knights actively participated in the reconquest of Valencia and the surrounding areas after 1235. Finally, Valencia capitulated to Aragonese rule on 28 September 1238, following an extensive campaign against the Moors. James triumphantly entered the city with his wife Violant on 9 October 1238. Denis' fiefdoms were confirmed in a perpetual and inheritance right (with tax exemption and free usage of local furnace and mill) on 24 January 1244. After the reconquest, several members of the Hungarian contingent were granted landholdings, houses and orange groves in Valencia and the surrounding settlements, according to the Llibre del Repartiment. Most of them married Aragonese lady-in-waitings, integrating into the local nobility.

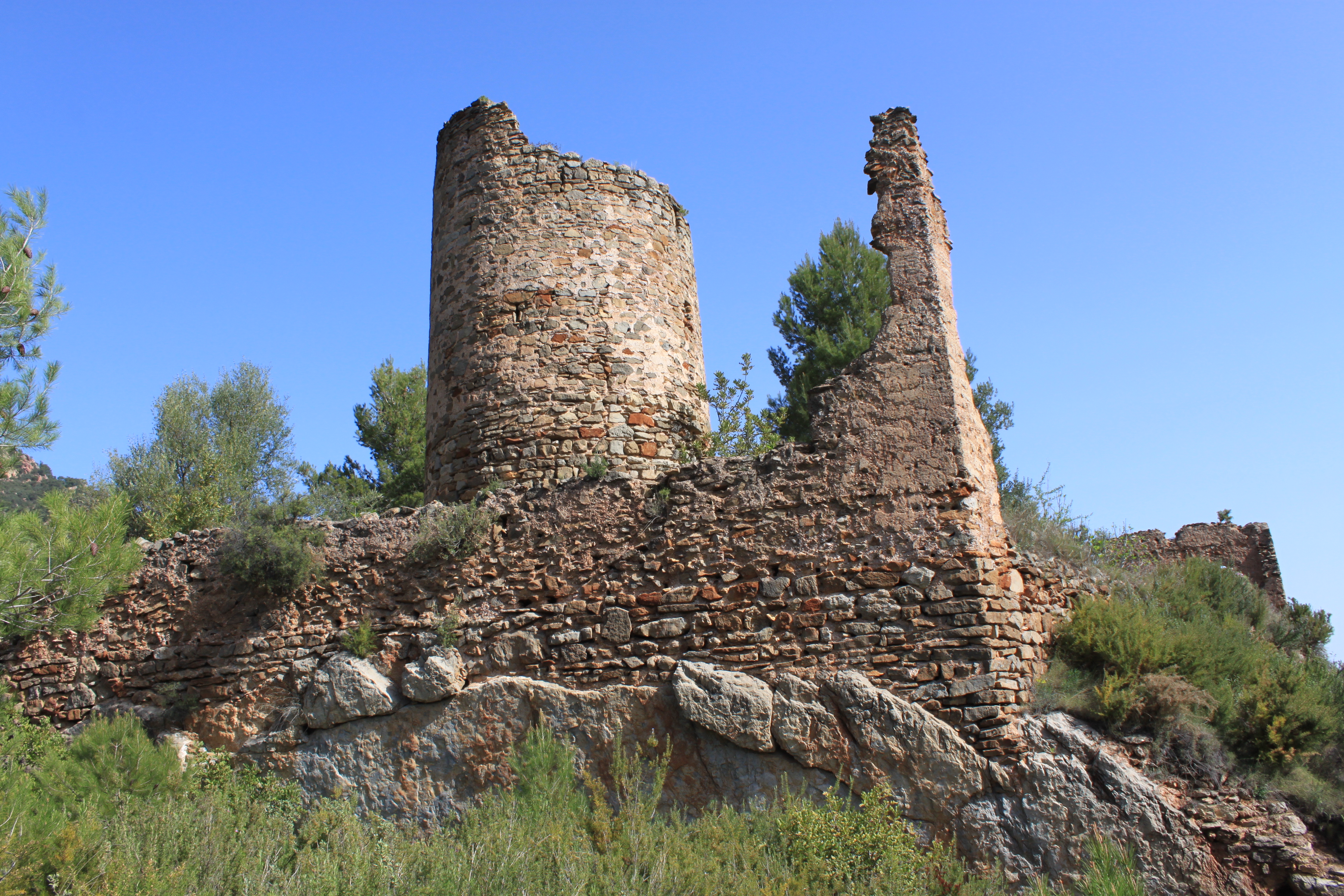
The castle ruins of Aín, possessed as a feudal fiefdom by Denis between 1235 and 1249

After the capture of Valencia, Denis himself was granted a palace opening onto two streets in the city, near the residence of the Bishop of Valencia. On 24 March 1249, King James donated the estate Canals, receiving the local tower and the small village, while the king created a new lordship, the Señorío de Torre de Canals for Denis and his kinship. Denis also became the lord of Crespins and owner of some estates in Xàtiva, in exchange for Alcudia de Veo and Aín, which the king took back for the Crown of Aragon, as it was recorded in the Llibre del Repartiment. Canals and Crespins laid in the fertile valley of the river Cànyoles. In the latter place, Denis built a fortified turreted mansion. Vajay considered the repossessed estates were of strategic importance in military terms, but were less profitable after the end of the war, thus, the exchange occurred in Denis' favor, and his new lordships were not mere compensation. The historian argued since then the signs of royal benevolence in favor of Denis continue to multiply, the beneficiary being designated for the most part as the "Count of Hungary", as he also names, very often, the many documents which, in the Crown Archives of Aragon, reflects his power and influence in the Aragonese royal court. Despite Denis pursued a successful court and military career in Aragon, he did not renounce his old titles which referred to his former homeland, and still adorned himself more frequently as "count [...] from Hungary" than his new fiefdoms in the kingdoms of Valencia and Aragon. Denis outlived his patron and lady, Queen Violant for decades, who died in 1251. He was still alive in 1265 and 1268, but was mentioned as a deceased person in 1272. The issue of agreements concerning his inheritance with his widow and children appeared in contemporary records in 1276.

== Descendants ==
Denis married Margarida de Cabrera, a lady-in-waiting of Queen Violant and a member of the influential House of Cabrera in Catalonia. She was the daughter of Guerau V, Viscount of Cabrera and Ramona de Montcada. Through this marriage, Denis instantly elevated into the upper class of the Catalan nobility. For instance, he became a brother-in-law of the reigning viscount Guerau VI and Ramon de Cabrera, the lord of the castle of Anglès. His sister-in-law Gueraua married William II (Guillem), the Baron of Montclús. Margarida's uncle was Ponce I, Count of Urgell and her cousins were counts Ermengol IX and Álvaro.

The marriage produced four sons and four daughters, they adopted the Dionís (Dionisii) surname after their father, which goes back to Hungarian tradition. According to Szabolcs de Vajay, the Dionís family became extinct on male branch on 31 January 1974. The last member of the family, Angel Dionis Cormán was employed as a provincial officer of the Renfe Operadora.

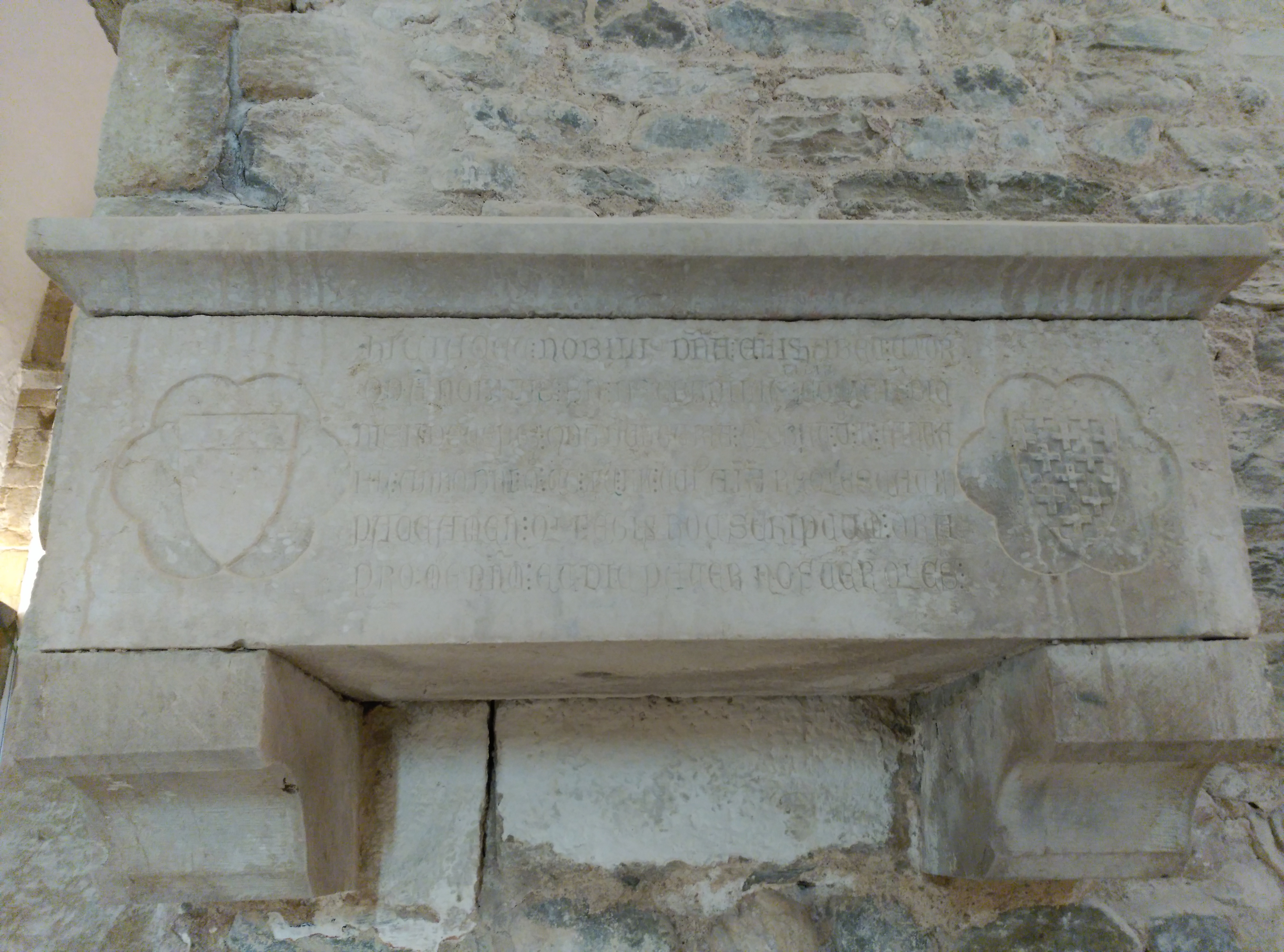
The tomb of Elizabeth, Denis' daughter, in the monastery of Sant Miquel in Cruïlles, on which the name and title of his father were preserved

Denis' eldest son was Amor. He visited Italy in June 1274 when traded with merchants from Pistoia. Peter III of Aragon confirmed his fiefdoms of Canals and Crespins on 3 February 1276. According to a document from 25 April 1278, Amor obtained 30,000 Valencian sous for his personal needs and to keep 40 knights in the service of the king, which reflects his high social status. He was among the nobles of the realm, who renewed their oath of fidelity to Peter III in 1283 in Tarazona. Amor and his younger brother, Gabriel accompanied King Alfonso III during the conquest of Majorca and Ibiza in 1286. However, shortly after they were active members of the Union of Aragon in 1287, which prompted the monarch to guarantee the nobles' right and freedom. Nevertheless, Amor participated in the war against the Kingdom of Majorca for Empordà in 1288. Amor was referred among the king's advisers in 1289. In the course of a diplomatic mission, Amor was sent to the Kingdom of Hungary – his late father's homeland – in 1291, where he negotiated with Andrew III of Hungary on behalf of the new monarch James II. The luxurious journey plunged Amor into serious debt, despite the financial support of the Hungarian king. He was obliged, on the way back to Padua, to contract debts with Hungarian students in the university, which were not settled, based on complaints, even in 1296. At the end of his life, Amor fully indebted in several directions, creditors in many cases applied for royal intervention. He was still alive on 23 May 1301, when sent a letter of supplication written in Catalan language to James II from his residence Canals. His son was James, who sold the lordship of Canals for 105,000 Valencian sous to Jaspert V de Castellnou on 13 October 1309, with the permission of James II, thus Amor was deceased by then. It is plausible that James inherited his father's huge debts and was therefore forced to take this step.

The second son, Gabriel was styled as the lord of Navarrés in 1279. He was involved in lawsuits over his lands in 1280. He participated in the aforementioned conquest of Ibiza and Majorca in 1286, then was involved in the political movement of the Union of Aragon in 1287. The union commissioned him to keep the Castle of Biar, which was later taken over by King James II and handed to his uncle Pedro Fernández de Híjar, the natural son of James I, in 1291. Thereafter, Gabriel disappears from sources and he was mentioned as a deceased person in 1309. Gabriel had unidentified daughters, who benefited from the sale of Canals in that year, and a natural son named Peter Lodomer, who was born from an extramarital relationship with Urraca Ximénez de Martes. Despite his illegitimate origin, Pope Clement V permitted him to become a member of one of the chivalric orders. He successfully petitioned to the court of James II in order to his legitimization in September 1327.

Denis' another son was Charles, according to Dániel Bácsatyai (see above). He was already a canon of Esztergom in March 1264, when Pope Urban IV appointed him a canon of Verona, upon the request of his uncle Cardinal Stephen Báncsa. He attended the University of Bologna in 1268. He was styled as provost of the collegiate chapter of Hájszentlőrinc in 1270, but it is possible he actually never occupied this church position. It is plausible he died before 1280. Denis' fourth (?) son was Peter Lodomer (not to be confused with his namesake nephew, see above). His double name perhaps indicates his extramarital origin. He attended the University of Bologna from 1268 to 1270, and belonged to the Spanish entourage of Pedro Laurencio, Bishop of Cuenca. He was a canon of the Girona Cathedral in January 1270. He died in this capacity on 24 January 1275.

The marriage of Denis and Margarida also produced four daughters. The eldest one, Gracia married Ximeno d'Urrea. The second daughter was Elizabeth, who married Bernat de Cruïlles i de Peratallada. She died on 27 December 1293, without children. Her husband Bernat married for the second time to Gueraua de Cabrera in 1305. Elizabeth's tomb was erected by her husband, and still can be found within the monastery of Sant Miquel in Cruïlles. The inscription of the monument preserved the title of Denis ("Comes de Cepeз"). The tomb depicts two heraldic shields: the right one represents the coat-of-arms of the de Cruïlles i de Peratallada family, while the left one was left blank, indicating that heraldry was not yet widespread in Hungary in the first third of the 13th century, and the Dionís family still had no coat-of-arms at the time of Elizabeth's death. The third daughter was Margaret, who married Pedro Martínez de Luna, the Elder. The fourth daughter was Jordana, who became the wife of Bernat de Penyafort, the nephew of Saint Raymond of Penyafort.

== Sources ==
- Bácsatyai, Dániel (2018). "Személyi összeköttetések a Curia Romana és a magyar egyház között a 13. század közepén. Pármai Albert és Báncsa István [Personal Relations between the Curia Romana and the Hungarian Church in the mid-13th Century. Albert of Parma and István Báncsa]". Történelmi Szemle (in Hungarian). 60 (2). Hungarian Academy of Sciences: 299–323. ISSN 0040-9634.
- Cerveró Martí, Lluís; Batllori i Munné, Miquel (1980). "El comte Dionís d'Hongria, senyor de Canals, al seguici de la reina Violant: la descendència de Dionís als regnes de València i d'Aragó [Count Denis of Hungary, Lord of Canals, in the Company of Queen Violant: the Descendants of Denis in the Kingdoms of Valencia and Aragon]". In Dufourcq, Charles E. (ed.). Jaime I y su época: X Congreso de Historia de la Corona de Aragón (Zaragoza, 1979) (in Catalan). Vol. 2. Saragossa: Institución Fernando el Católico. pp. 559–577. ISBN 9788400043865.
- Csifó, Tamás (2019). "A Magyar Királyság kapcsolatai Hispániával a 12. század végén és a 13. század első felében [The connections of the Kingdom of Hungary with Hispania at the end of the 12th and in the first half of the 13th century]". Móra Akadémia (in Hungarian). 7. SZTE Móra Ferenc Kollégium: 152–174. ISSN 2064-809X.
- Kiss, Gergely (2019). "Családi kör? A bíborosi família kutatásának módszertani kérdései az első magyar bíboros, Báncsa István példáján keresztül [Family Circle? Methodological Issues of the Research of the Cardinal's Familia through the Example of the First Hungarian Cardinal, Stephen Báncsa]". In Lengvári, István; Pilkhoffer, Mónika; Vonyó, József (eds.). Az ember helye – a hely embere. Emberközpontú történetírás ‒ helytörténeti kutatás (in Hungarian). Hungarian Historical Society – Kronosz Kiadó. pp. 119–142. ISBN 978-615-6048-41-7.
- Vajay, Szabolcs (1973). "De l'acculturation medievale à travers le destin d'une famille transplantée: Les ancetres hongrois et la descendence catalane du Comte Dionis [From medieval acculturation through the fate of a transplanted family: Hungarian ancestors and the Catalan descent of Count Dionis]". II Assemblea dʼEstudis sobre el Comtat de Besalú: actes (in French). Amics de Besalú. pp. 231–265.
- Vajay, Szabolcs (2009). "Dominae reginae milites. Árpád-házi Jolánta magyarjai Valencia visszavétele idején [Dominae reginae milites. The Hungarians of Violant of Hungary at the Time of the Recapture of Valencia]". In Tóth, Csaba; Sarobe, Ramon (eds.). Királylányok messzi földről. Magyarország és Katalónia a középkorban (in Hungarian). Hungarian National Museum. pp. 243–263. ISBN 978-963-706-164-6.
- Wertner, Mór (1895). "Ompud nádor és utódai [Palatine Ampud and his Descendants]". Turul (in Hungarian). 13 (2): 91–93. ISSN 1216-7258.
