= Benedict II (archbishop of Esztergom) =

Hungarian prelate

Benedict
- Archbishop of Esztergom
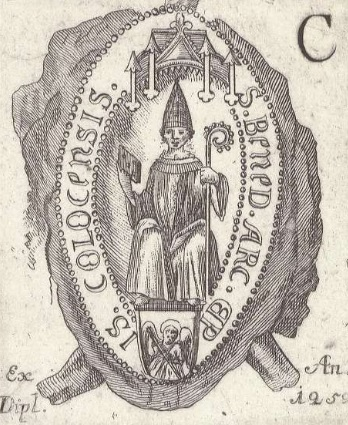
- Seal of Benedict from 1252, as depicted in Nándor Knauz's Monumenta ecclesiae Strigoniensis (1874)
- Installed: 1253
- Term ended: 1261
- Predecessor: Stephen Báncsa
- Successor: Philip Türje
- Other post: Archbishop of Kalocsa

Personal details
- Died: after July 1261
- Denomination: Roman Catholic

Benedict (Hungarian: Benedek; died after July 1261) was a Hungarian prelate in the 13th century, who served as Archbishop of Kalocsa from 1241 to 1254, and as Archbishop of Esztergom from 1253 to 1261. As one of the most influential prelates following the Mongol invasion of Hungary, he held the office of royal chancellor for two decades, from 1240 until his death.

== Early career ==
His origin is uncertain, but he was definitely born into a wealthy noble family, as one of his relatives was a certain comes Peter. In contemporary records, his name is referred to with the honorary title of "magister", demonstrating his education and skills in science. He first appears as vice-chancellor and provost of Buda in January 1238, holding both positions until 18 June 1240. His "friend", Bartholomew, Bishop of Veszprém ceded certain tithe to the provostry of Buda. On 25 June 1240, he is already styled as royal chancellor. He functioned in this capacity for more than two decades until his death, the longest time of any office-holders during the Age of Árpáds. Simultaneously, Benedict was elected provost of Székesfehérvár too, serving in this dignity until 1244. Shortly after the election, the chapter petitioned the case to the Holy See to request Benedict's confirmation from Pope Gregory IX, who appointed John of Civitella on 25 February 1241 to conduct the procedure. In his reply, the pope called Benedict as an "educated, diligent and honest man", finding him fit for the position.

After the disastrous Battle of Mohi in April 1241, Benedict fled together with king Béla IV and the royal court to the Dalmatian coast, and stayed there until the withdrawal of the Mongols from Hungary in 1242.

== Archbishop of Kalocsa ==
Archbishop Ugrin Csák was killed in the Battle of Mohi. Benedict was already styled as archbishop-elect in September 1241, when the royal court resided in Transdanubia yet. However, theologian József Udvardy considered that royal charter as a forgery. When the court arrived to Dalmatia by February 1242, Thomas the Archdeacon again referred to him as archbishop-elect. Udvardy argued Benedict's title meant a broad interpretation and merely Béla's wish, as the cathedral chapter was unable to meet under the chaotic conditions and a royal document issued in August 1242 states that there was sede vacante in the episcopal see of Kalocsa. The canonical election of Benedict took place in the autumn of 1242, according to Udvardy. the newly elected Pope Innocent IV confirmed the episcopate of Benedict on 15 July 1243.

The Archdiocese of Kalocsa suffered heavy damages due to the ravages of the Mongols, who left behind destroyed villages, depopulated regions, ruined churches and monasteries. As a result, Benedict decided to settle the friars of the Augustinian Order. In addition, Benedict intended to acquire lands and estates for his archbishopric; he bought the half of the village Füzegy, near to Szond in Bács County (Vizić and Sonta in Serbia, respectively) from local lord Gregory Monoszló, who was forced to sell to the archdiocese because of its right of pre-emption in 1252. Béla IV also donated a certain land of Pechul to Benedict, who also took care of the disabled child of Csama, the deceased landowner. Preparing for a new Mongol invasion, the Hungarian king abandoned the ancient royal prerogative to build and own castles, promoting the erection of new fortresses during his reign. The pope sent a letter to Benedict to entrust him and his suffragan bishops by defining places to build castles in the territory of the archdiocese. During several lawsuits regarding ecclesiastical estates, Benedict frequently acted as a mediator between the Holy See and the Hungarian royal court. When Béla IV filed a complaint that Zlaudus Ják was elected Bishop of Veszprém without his consent in 1245, which "contradicted the old customary law", Innocent instructed Benedict of Kalocsa to investigate the case in February 1245. According to his letter, Stephen Báncsa, Archbishop of Esztergom confirmed Zlaudus' election despite the king's opposition. Béla did not recognize the election and ignored Zlaudus in the royal council (his charters refer to the Diocese of Veszprém "in vacancy"). The conflict has been resolved by December 1245. When Philip Türje was elected Bishop of Zagreb in 1248, Benedict, as the metropolitan archbishop, confirmed the election, despite that one of the canons Albert challenged the legitimacy of the process. Thereafter Albert petitioned to the Holy See, but Pope Innocent confirmed Benedict's decision on 26 October 1248.

Like his predecessors, Benedict also had to deal with the question of Bogomilism. In the summer of 1246, Benedict requested the Holy See to allow a crusade to be launched against the Bosnian Church. In response, Pope Innocent appointed him as a papal legate to Bosnia. As a response to the request of Béla IV and Ponsa, Bishop of Bosnia, Pope Innocent IV decided to put the Bosnian Church under the jurisdiction of the Archdiocese of Kalocsa in 1252. This decision provoked the schism of the Bosnian Christians, who refused to submit to the Hungarians and broke off their relations with Rome. Beside his function of royal chancellor, Benedict was also styled as "chief judge of the Jews" in 1251. He served as ispán and "royal governor" of Syrmia County in 1253 too, when ruled over a counterfeiting case. Benedict donated the estate Úrkuta in Esztergom County to Stephen Báncsa in 1251.

== Archbishop of Esztergom ==
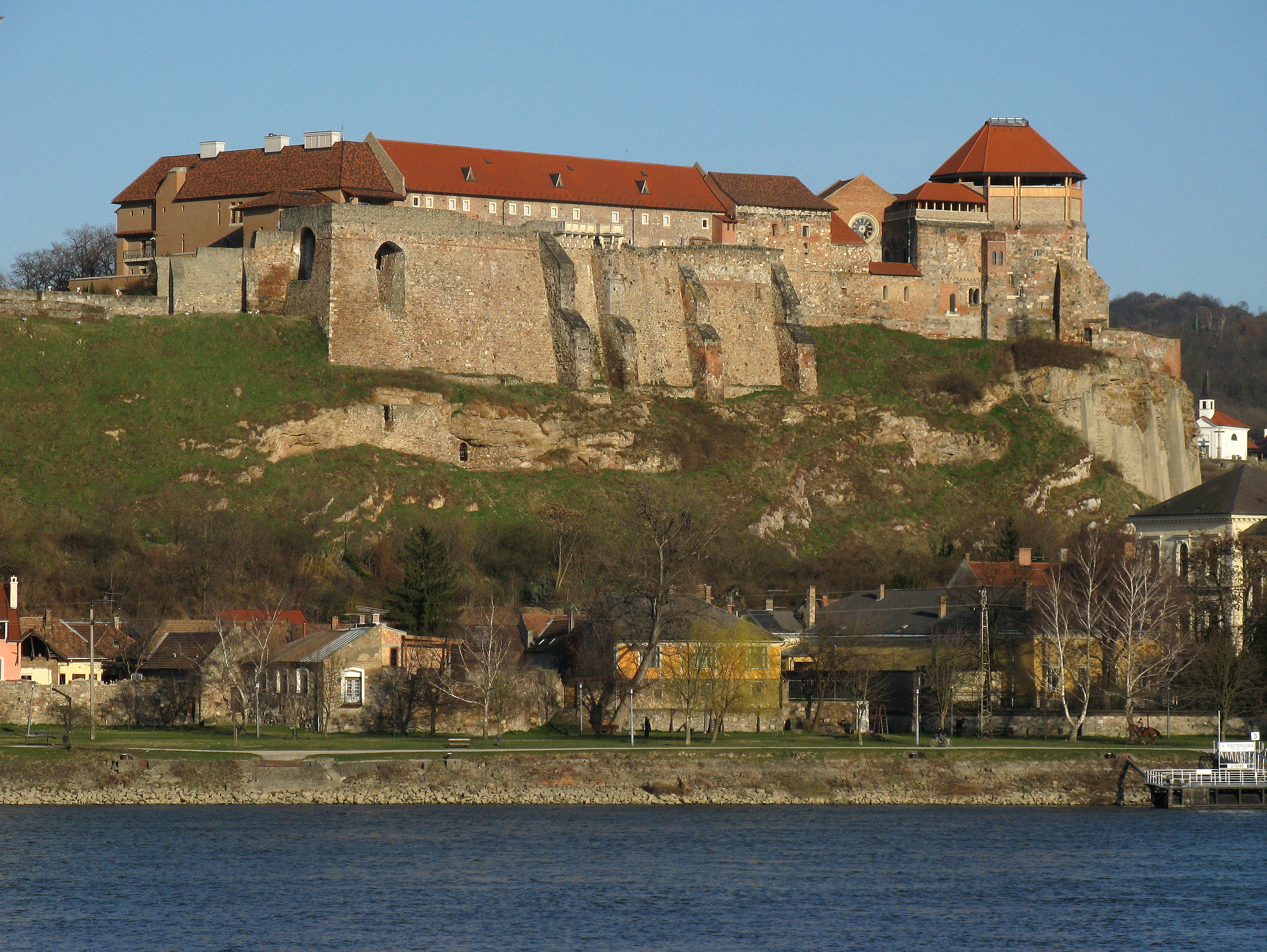
The first royal castle of Esztergom became the archbishopric's property under Benedict's episcopate in 1256

Stephen Báncsa was created Cardinal Bishop of Praeneste (Palestrina) by Pope Innocent IV in December 1251, becoming the first Hungarian cardinal. Báncsa remained in the position of archbishop at least until 20 October 1252. Thereafter, he temporarily left Hungary for Rome. Even so, upon his personal request, he continued to serve as Administrator of the Archdiocese of Esztergom. However, he wanted to return to Hungary because of financial difficulties and climatic inconveniences. However, Báncsa's efforts in this direction failed. The Esztergom Chapter elected Benedict as their archbishop sometimes before May 1253. Benedict was submitted by Béla IV himself to the position. The king requested the pope to confirm it in a letter dated May 1253. Later, he repeated his request in October. Simultaneously, Innocent granted Báncsa the privilege of returning to Esztergom, and continuing his administration of that diocese, until the next Feast of All Saints (November 1). At that point he was to resign the Church of Esztergom to a prelate of the Kingdom of Hungary of his choice, and return to the Papal Curia by Christmas 1253. If he did not return by that date, the bishopric of Palestrina was to be considered vacant, according to the pope's instruction. Báncsa did not achieve his purpose, as the legitimacy of his administration was not recognized in Hungary; finally, the election of Benedict was confirmed by Pope Innocent on 25 February 1254. Benedict was advised, however, that during his episcopate, he should not give away pensions or prebends without the express permission of the Holy See. As compensation, Stephen Báncsa was granted annual 300 silver denari from the archdiocese's income. Thus Báncsa was forced to return to Rome. Benedict had to borrow 3500 silver denari during his translation from Kalocsa to Esztergom. On 11 March 1254, Pope Innocent sent his pallium through his procurators, provost Peter and vicar Reynold.

Benedict was present, when Pope Innocent IV mediated a peace treaty between Béla IV and Ottokar II of Bohemia, which was signed in Pressburg (present-day Bratislava, Slovakia) on 1 May 1254. He was granted the vineyard of Vadkert (today Érsekvadkert, lit. "Archbishop's Wild Garden") and the right of collection of tithe beyond the Drava river by Béla in 1255. Benedict built a fortified manor and stone tower (also called archiepiscopal castle) at the northern tip of Margaret Island. Benedict had several conflicts with the local burghers, who were allowed to live in Esztergom Castle. As a result, Béla IV resettled them to their old homes, and the archdiocese was granted the royal palace and the surrounding ancient castrum on 17 December 1256 (the phrase "Holy Crown" first appears in this donation letter). Simultaneously, the king ordered the construction of reinforced stone walls around the town of Buda and set his own royal palace on the top of the protecting hills of Buda, creating a new royal capital in the decades between 1247 and 1265. Benedict held a national synod in Esztergom in the same year (1256), where several bishops and, among others, Blessed Eusebius, the First Provincial of the Order of Saint Paul the First Hermit (first mentioned in this capacity) attended, but its resolutions did not survive. Pope Alexander IV donated the privilege of annual 40-day indulgence to the visitors of the St. Adalbert Cathedral of Esztergom on the occasion of the Feast of Saints Peter and Paul in 1257.

Data about some of Benedict's purchases has survived. He acquired Tereske in Nógrád County in 1255. He bought Szodó in Bars County (present-day a borough of Želiezovce, Slovakia), Muzsla in Esztergom County (present-day Mužla, Slovakia) and Hakara along the stream Lókos in Nógrád County in 1257. He also purchased Császtó in Bars County in 1260. He exchanged the chapter's estate Jenő (laid in present-day Budapest) and the freedmen living there for Szalka in Hont County (present-day Salka, Slovakia) with Béla IV in 1261. Benedict ceded 20 marks a year of his income to the chapter, but the jurisdiction over the estate belonged to him. The Mongol invasion caused social changes that negatively affected the administration of the archdiocese. Several local nobles placed themselves under the patronage of the church in exchange for military service. However, the significant increase in taxes after products on the church estates resulted in the large-scale desertion of the ecclesiastical nobility. In 1255, Béla IV commissioned three nobles in Nógrád County to find the fleeing nobles of the archdiocese of Esztergom. The archdiocese lost a significant part of the royal income, due to privileges granted by the king to the conditional nobles. Benedict died in the second half of 1261, last mentioned by contemporary records in July.

== Sources ==
- Beke, Margit (2003). "II. Benedek [Benedict II]". In Beke, Margit (ed.). Esztergomi érsekek 1001–2003 [Archbishops of Esztergom 1001–2003] (in Hungarian). Szent István Társulat. pp. 112–115. ISBN 963-361-472-4.
- Kis, Péter (2000). "Az esztergomi érsekek uradalomszervezése a XIII. század második felében [The Organization of Lordships by the Archbishops of Esztergom in the Second Half of the 13th Century]". In Piti, Ferenc; Szabados, György (eds.). "Magyaroknak eleiről". Ünnepi tanulmányok a hatvan esztendős Makk Ferenc tiszteletére (in Hungarian). Szegedi Középkorász Műhely. pp. 225–248. ISBN 963-482-500-1.
- Markó, László (2006). A magyar állam főméltóságai Szent Istvántól napjainkig: Életrajzi Lexikon [Great Officers of State in Hungary from King Saint Stephen to Our Days: A Biographical Encyclopedia] (in Hungarian). Helikon Kiadó. ISBN 963-208-970-7.
- Szűcs, Jenő (1978). "A kereszténység belső politikuma a XIII. század derekán. IV. Béla király és az egyház [The Inner Politics of Christendom in the Middle of the 13th Century: King Béla IV and the Church]". Történelmi Szemle (in Hungarian). 21 (1). Hungarian Academy of Sciences: 158–181. ISSN 0040-9634.
- Udvardy, József (1991). A kalocsai érsekek életrajza (1000–1526) [Biographies of Archbishops of Kalocsa, 1000–1526] (in Hungarian).
- Zsoldos, Attila (2011). Magyarország világi archontológiája, 1000–1301 [Secular Archontology of Hungary, 1000–1301] (in Hungarian). História, MTA Történettudományi Intézete. ISBN 978-963-9627-38-3.

Political offices
| Preceded by Nicholas | Vice-chancellor; 1238–1240 | Succeeded by Nicholas |
| Preceded by Stephen Báncsa | Chancellor; 1240–1261 | Succeeded by Philip Türje |
Catholic Church titles
| Preceded by Michael | Provost of Székesfehérvár; 1240–1244 | Succeeded by Achilles Hont-Pázmány |
| Preceded by Ugrin Csák | Archbishop of Kalocsa; 1241–1254 | Succeeded by Thomas Hahót |
| Preceded by Stephen Báncsa | Archbishop of Esztergom; 1253–1261 | Succeeded by Philip Türje |
