= Strekov =

Strekov Kürt
- Municipality
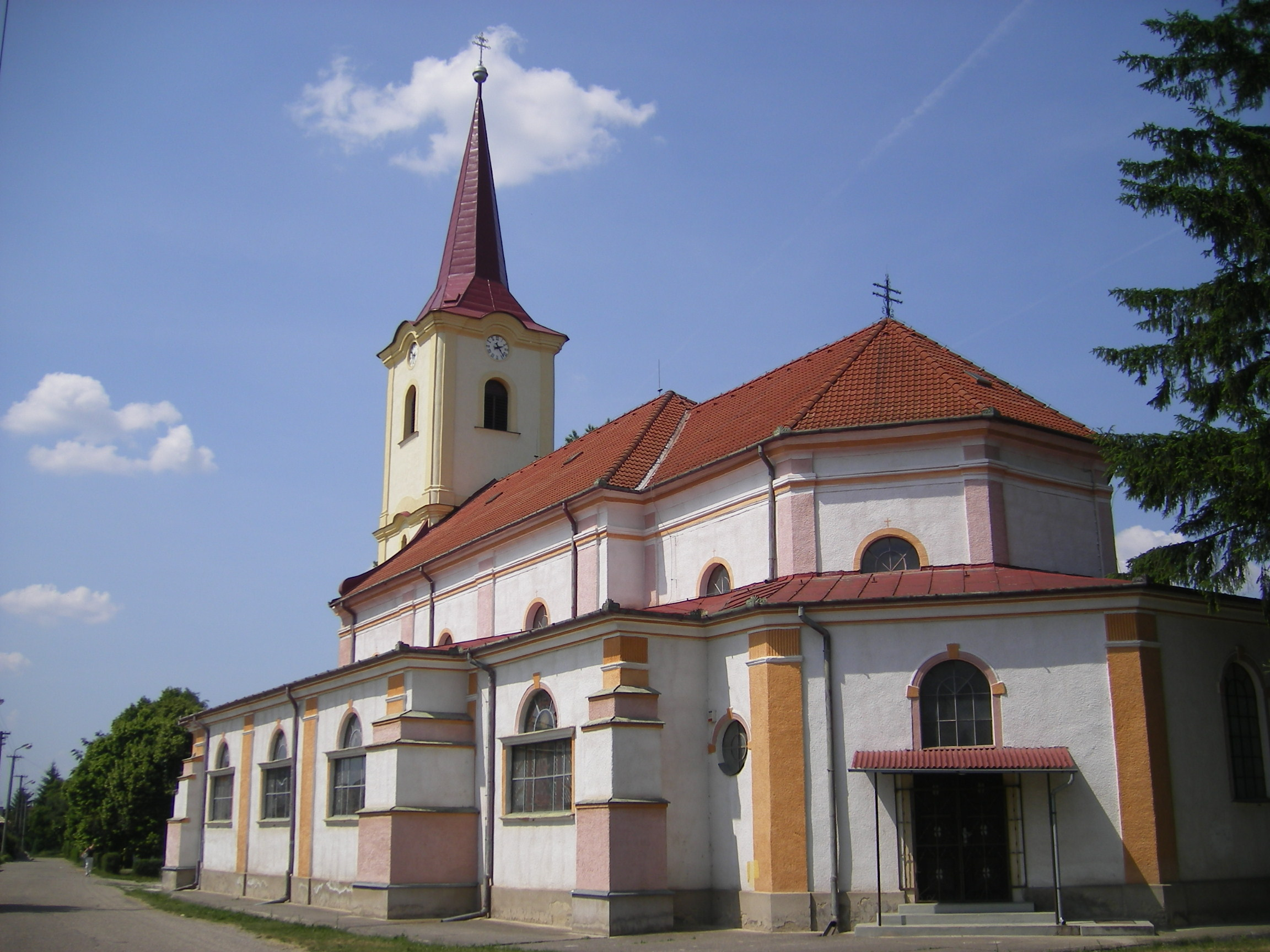
- Church of the Virgin Mary

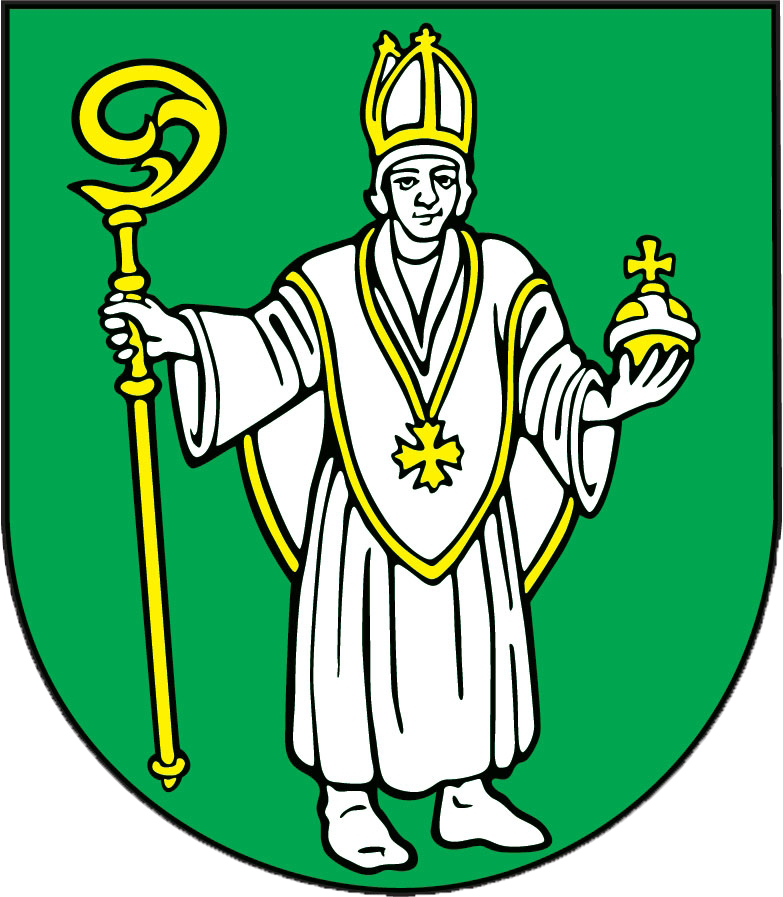
- Flag Coat of arms

- Location of Strekov in the Nitra Region Location of Strekov in Slovakia
- Coordinates: 47.90°N 18.42°E
- Country: Slovakia
- Region: Nitra Region
- District: Nové Zámky District
- First mentioned: 1156

Government
  - Mayor: János Téglás (SMK-MKP)

Area
  - Total: 41.05 km^{2} (15.85 sq mi)
- Elevation: 140 m (460 ft)

Population (2025)
  - Total: 1,866
- Time zone: UTC+1 (CET)
  - Summer (DST): UTC+2 (CEST)
- Postal code: 941 37
- Area code: +421 35
- Vehicle registration plate (until 2022): NZ
- Website: www.strekov.sk

Strekov (Hungarian: Kürt) is a village and municipality in the Nové Zámky District in the Nitra Region of south-west Slovakia. It's known as one of the best winemaking areas in Slovakia and is home to multiple pioneers of Natural wine movement.

== Geography ==
The municipality lies at an altitude of 140 metres (460 ft) and covers an area of 41.05 km^{2} (15.85 sq mi) (2025).

== History ==
In historical records the village was first mentioned in 1075. After the Austro-Hungarian army disintegrated in November 1918, Czechoslovak troops occupied the area, later acknowledged internationally by the Treaty of Trianon. Between 1938 and 1945 Strekov once more became part of Miklós Horthy's Hungary through the First Vienna Award. From 1945 until the Velvet Divorce, it was part of Czechoslovakia. Since then it has been part of Slovakia.

== Population ==
Population statistic (10 years)
Year	1995	2005	2015	2025
Count	2302	2201	1988	1866
Difference		−4.38%	−9.67%	−6.13%

Population statistic
Year	2024	2025
Count	1872	1866
Difference		−0.32%

It has a population of 1866 people (31 December 2025).

=== Ethnicity ===
Census 2021 (1+ %)
Ethnicity	Number	Fraction
Hungarian	1567	81.36%
Slovak	313	16.25%
Not found out	120	6.23%
Romani	22	1.14%
Total	1926	

In year 2021 was 1926 people by ethnicity 1567 as Hungarian, 313 as Slovak, 120 as Not found out, 22 as Romani, 5 as Czech, 2 as Vietnamese and 2 as Other.

Note on population: The difference values of population numbers in the table "Population statistic" and in the sections "Ethnicity" & "Religion" is caused by the use of various statistical methods.

=== Religion ===
Census 2021 (1+ %)
Religion	Number	Fraction
Roman Catholic Church	1551	80.53%
None	206	10.7%
Not found out	88	4.57%
Calvinist Church	50	2.6%
Total	1926	

In year 2021 was 1926 people by religion 1551 from Roman Catholic Church, 206 from None, 88 from Not found out, 50 from Calvinist Church, 11 from Greek Catholic Church, 7 from Evangelical Church, 5 from Christian Congregations in Slovakia, 2 from Other, 1 from Other and not ascertained christian church, 1 from Jehovah's Witnesses, 1 from Hinduism, 1 from United Methodist Church, 1 from Apostolic Church and 1 from Ad hoc movements.

== Facilities ==
The village has a small public library a gym and a football pitch.
