= Farná =

Municipality of Slovakia

Farná Farnad
- Municipality
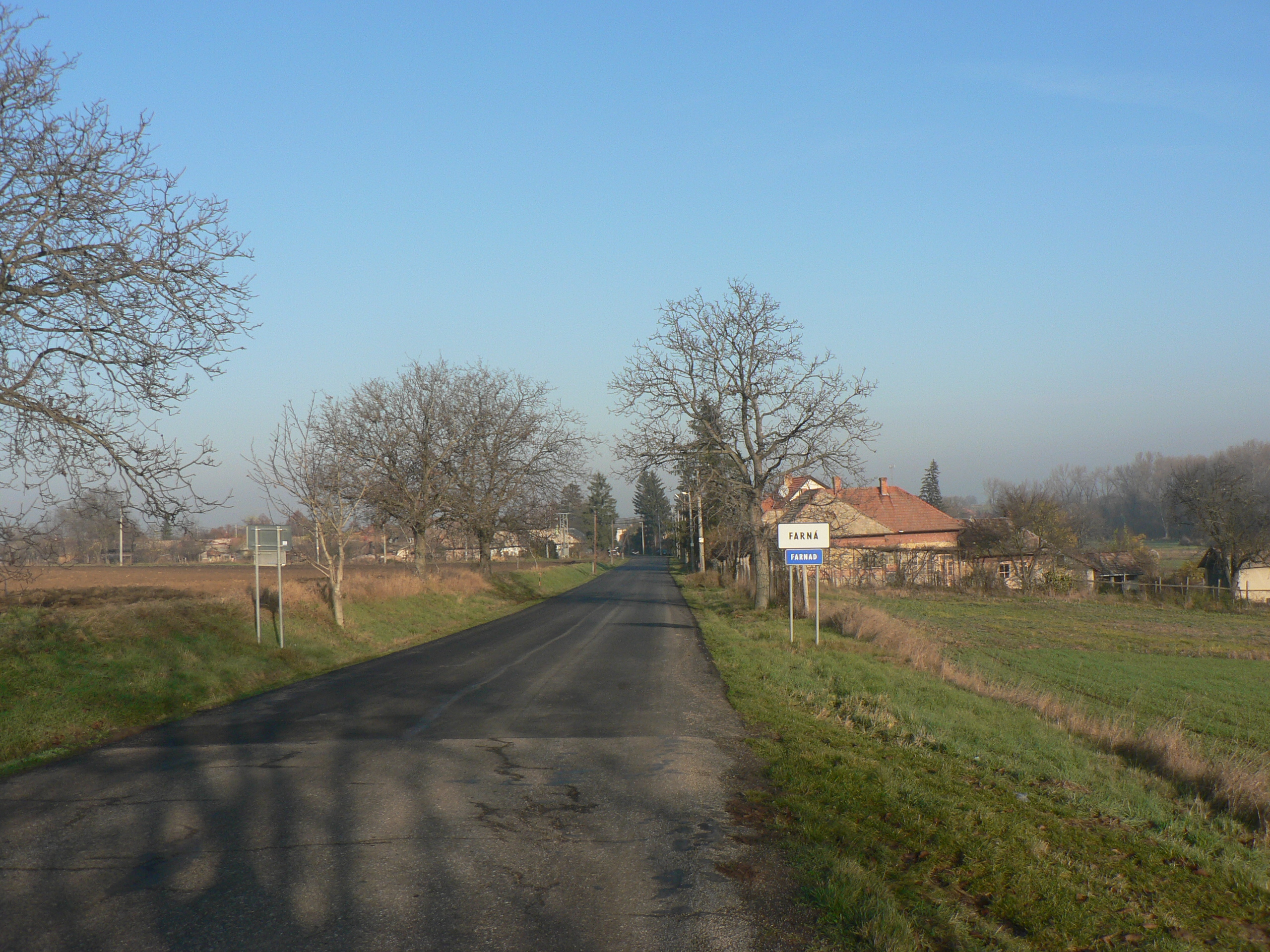

- Flag Coat of arms

- Location of Farná in the Nitra Region Location of Farná in Slovakia
- Coordinates: 48.00°N 18.52°E
- Country: Slovakia
- Region: Nitra Region
- District: Levice District
- First mentioned: 1156

Area
  - Total: 32.74 km^{2} (12.64 sq mi)
- Elevation: 148 m (486 ft)

Population (2025)
  - Total: 1,320
- Time zone: UTC+1 (CET)
  - Summer (DST): UTC+2 (CEST)
- Postal code: 935 66
- Area code: +421 36
- Vehicle registration plate (until 2022): LV
- Website: www.farna.sk

Farná (Hungarian: Farnad) is a village and municipality in the Levice District in the Nitra Region of Slovakia.

== History ==
In historical records the village was first mentioned in 1156.

== Geography ==
The municipality lies at an altitude of 148 metres (486 ft) and covers an area of 32.74 km^{2} (12.64 sq mi) (2025).

== Population ==
Population statistic (10 years)
Year	1995	2005	2015	2025
Count	1440	1440	1345	1320
Difference		+0%	−6.59%	−1.85%

Population statistic
Year	2024	2025
Count	1327	1320
Difference		−0.52%

It has a population of 1320 people (31 December 2025).

=== Ethnicity ===
Census 2021 (1+ %)
Ethnicity	Number	Fraction
Hungarian	906	67.16%
Slovak	406	30.09%
Not found out	83	6.15%
Romani	66	4.89%
Total	1349	

In year 2021 was 1349 people by ethnicity 906 as Hungarian, 406 as Slovak, 83 as Not found out, 66 as Romani, 2 as Czech, 2 as German, 2 as Other and 1 as Austrian.

Note on population: The difference values of population numbers in the table "Population statistic" and in the sections "Ethnicity" & "Religion" is caused by the use of various statistical methods.

=== Religion ===
Census 2021 (1+ %)
Religion	Number	Fraction
Roman Catholic Church	783	58.04%
None	188	13.94%
Calvinist Church	145	10.75%
Evangelical Church	122	9.04%
Not found out	81	6%
Greek Catholic Church	18	1.33%
Total	1349	

In year 2021 was 1349 people by religion 783 from Roman Catholic Church, 188 from None, 145 from Calvinist Church, 122 from Evangelical Church, 81 from Not found out, 18 from Greek Catholic Church, 10 from Jehovah's Witnesses and 2 from Other.

== Facilities ==
The village has a public library a gym and a football pitch.

== Genealogical resources ==
The records for genealogical research are available at the state archive "Statny Archiv in Nitra, Slovakia"

- Roman Catholic church records (births/marriages/deaths): 1731-1900 (parish A)
- Lutheran church records (births/marriages/deaths): 1785-1959 (parish B)
- Reformated church records (births/marriages/deaths): 1824-1955 (parish A)

== See also ==
- List of municipalities and towns in Slovakia
