= Michael Rosd =

Hungarian nobleman

Michael (I) Rosd

Ispán of Nyitra
- Reign: 1270–1273; 1274; 1274–1276; 1277
- Predecessor: Csák Hahót (1st term); James Bána (2nd & 3rd term); Thomas Hont-Pázmány (4th term)
- Successor: James Bána (1st & 2nd term); Peter Csák (3rd & 4th term)
- Died: after 1277
- Noble family: gens Rosd
- Spouses: 1, unidentified 2, N Hont-Pázmány
- Issue: (1) Demetrius II (1) Michael II (1) a daughter
- Father: Andrew (Endre)

Michael (I) from the kindred Rosd (also known as Michael the Small; Hungarian: Rosd nembeli (I.) "Kis" Mihály; died after 1277) was a Hungarian nobleman and soldier in the second half of the 13th century. He served as ispán of Nyitra County several times in the 1270s.

== Family ==
Michael was born into an ancient Hungarian kindred, the clan Rosd, as son of Andrew (or Endre). The contemporary Simon of Kéza's Gesta Hunnorum et Hungarorum referred to him with his nickname "the Small" or "the Short" (parvus) because of his small stature. Michael had an elder brother Demetrius (I). Throughout their lives, they worked closely together on wealth acquisition and political involvement. The kindred possessed landholdings and villages in Rosd Island on the Danube (present-day known as Szentendre Island), in addition along the nearby opposite shoreline of the river on the eastern edge of Pilis royal forest.

== Career ==
The political and social rise of the brothers was made possible by a dynastic conflict that escalated into a civil war. The relationship between King Béla IV and his eldest son Stephen became tense by the early 1260s. After a brief skirmish, Stephen forced his father to cede all the lands of the Kingdom of Hungary to the east of the Danube to him and adopted the title of junior king in 1262. The landholdings of the Rosd clan came into the border zone of the two emerging domains. Both Demetrius and Michael joined Stephen's retinue, connecting their fate, fortune and social ascendancy to the power aspirations of the younger king. Stephen, violating the 1262 peace treaty, seized those castles and lordships in his territory, which belonged to the other members of the Árpád dynasty. One of these forts was Füzér in Újvár County, which he entrusted to his confidant Michael Rosd to guard and protect sometime in 1263. Both Demetrius and Michael left behind their possessions in Central Hungary in order to serve Duke Stephen in his realm.

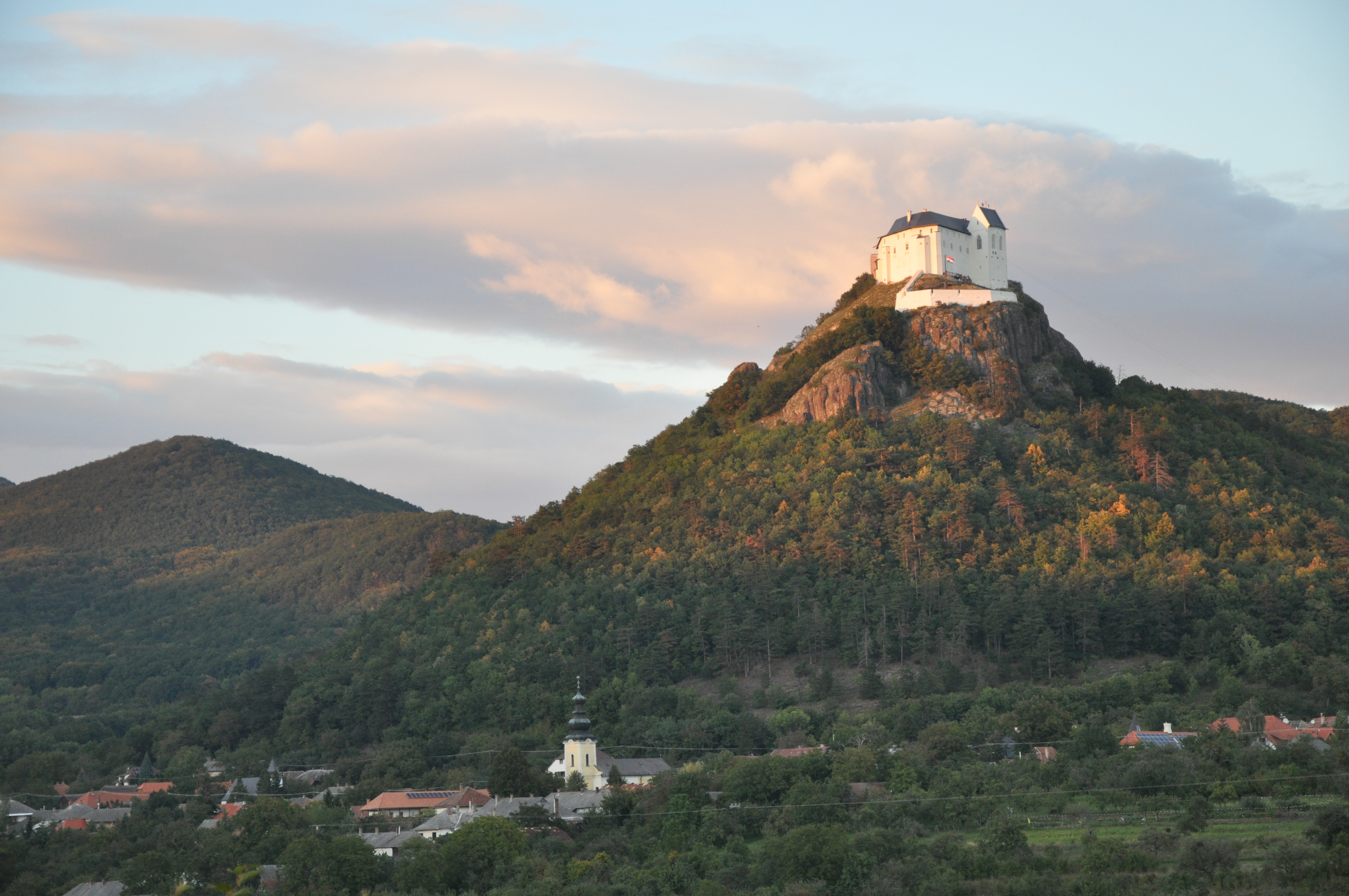
The castle of Füzér after its renovation

By the autumn of 1264, both parties prepared for war. While Demetrius joined Stephen's army in Transylvania, Michael remained in Füzér Castle in order to lead its garrison. The civil war broke out in December 1264, when Béla IV invaded his son's realm in southern Transylvania. Simultaneously, another royal army stormed into Northeast Hungary under the leadership of Duchess Anna of Macsó and Henry Kőszegi and began to besiege and occupy Stephen's castles one after another, for instance Patak, Ágasvár and Szádvár. However, Michael Rosd successfully defended the fort of Füzér and another nearby fort called "Temethyn" with a small number of guards, also resisting various attempts at bribery and threat. "Temethyn" was referred to as the property of the Rosd kindred, and former historiography identified it with Temetvény Castle in Nyitra County (present-day Hrádok, Slovakia). However, there is no known other landholdings of the Rosds in Nyitra County and since they had relatively modest fortune, as their social ascension occurred only during the reign of Stephen after 1270, so their wealth could not be enough to build a castle. Moreover, the two castles lay at an insurmountable distance from each other, which would make simultaneous protection impossible. Historian Attila Zsoldos identified "Temethyn" consisting of ditches and ramparts with a recently excavated fortified outpost at the top of the Őrhegy ("Guard Hill") about 1 km from the caste of Füzér (word "temetvény" originally meant "embankment"). After the younger king successfully defended the fort of Feketehalom (present-day Codlea, Romania), his united army decided to march into the central parts of Hungary. His several partisans joined the army on its route, including Michael, while his brother Demetrius stayed in the Stephen's environment throughout the war. The Rosd brothers participated in the battle somewhere in Tiszántúl against Ernye Ákos' army in the second half of February 1265. They were also present in the decisive Battle of Isaszeg in early March 1265.

Shortly before Stephen V ascended the Hungarian throne in 1270, the younger king generously rewarded his faithful partisans, including the Rosd brothers, Demetrius and Michael, who were granted Füzér Castle and its lordship, altogether eleven villages, including Füzér, Komlós, Nyíri, Kajata and Telki in Abaúj County. Beside that, Stephen issued a second donation letter still in that year, in which he donated the villages Lónya, Szalóka (Solovka), Bátyú (Batiovo), Bótrágy (Batrad), Szentmiklós (Chynadiiovo) and Szolyva (Svaliava) in Bereg County (present-day all settlements, but Lónya, belong to Zakarpattia Oblast, Ukraine) to Michael alone. Previously, a certain Simon, the son-in-law of Bánk Bár-Kalán, who participated in the murder of Queen Gertrude, possessed these landholdings. Stephen – now as king of whole Hungary – confirmed these land donations in February 1272. In the county, Michael already owned Vily and Kölcsény (Kolchyno, Ukraine). The brothers also owned portions in Szada in Zemplén County by 1276. Michael donated his land there to his servants with the consent of his brother and adult son. Demetrius and Michael also received the right of patronage over the Cistercian Klostermarienberg Abbey (Borsmonostor, today part of Mannersdorf an der Rabnitz, Austria) sometime around 1270, after the king confiscated the right from Lawrence Aba, who fled the kingdom after his coronation. Michael served as ispán of Nyitra County at least from August 1270 to December 1273 or January 1274. During the 1270s civil war, which escalated under the rule of the minor Ladislaus IV, Michael lost and regained his dignity in accordance with the then state of power rivalry. The Rosd brothers were supporters of the Csák kindred during the internal conflict. Michael was referred to as ispán of Nyitra County in July 1274 and from November 1274 until the first half of 1276, finally in November 1277. Sometime in 1274 or 1275, Demetrius and Michael was temporarily deprived from the right of patronage over Borsmonostor in favor of Lawrence Aba. However, they regained the right by Ladislaus IV in November 1277, again dismissing Lawrence Aba from this position. It is worth noting that historian Pál Engel attributed the aforementioned career – head of Nyitra County and possessors of the patronage of Borsmonostor in the 1270s – to Demetrius II Csák and his hypothetical brother Michael from their clan's Ugod branch.

== Descendants ==
Michael and his first unidentified wife had three children: two sons – Demetrius (II) and Michael (II) – and an unidentified daughter. Following the death of his first wife, Michael married an unidentified daughter of Cosmas Hont-Pázmány from the prestigious clan's Szentgyörgy branch, which also reflects Michael's social ascension after the 1264–1265 civil war. Michael died sometime after 1277. His kinship became extinct within a few years. Demetrius (II) was killed in the Battle of Lake Hód against the Cumans in 1282, while Michael (II) laid on his deathbed in 1285. By that year, Michael's second spouse was already the wife of James Berenthei. She proved to be a good stepmother of Michael's children: for instance, she spent 400 silver marks to finalize the wedding of Michael's daughter and Cletus, the son of Vincent Báncsa (they had no known children). As a result, the dying Michael (II), who died without male descendants, requested Ladislaus IV to donate the villages Szalóka, Bótrágy and Bátyú from the Lónya lordship, which returned to the crown after the death of Michael (II) in 1285, to his stepmother and her second husband James, and their common three minor sons (i.e. Michael definitely died already before c. 1280). James and Michael's widow became progenitors of the influential Lónyay (Lónyai) family, who established its initial wealth mostly based on Michael Rosd's acquisitions.

== Sources ==
- Feld, István; Cabello, Juan (1980). A füzéri vár [The Castle of Füzér] (in Hungarian). Borsodi Kismonográfiák 11, Herman Ottó Múzeum. ISBN 963-01-2854-3.
- Karácsonyi, János (1901). A magyar nemzetségek a XIV. század közepéig. III. kötet [The Hungarian genera until the middle of the 14th century, Vol. 3] (in Hungarian). Hungarian Academy of Sciences.
- Szűcs, Jenő (2002). Az utolsó Árpádok [The Last Árpáds] (in Hungarian). Osiris Kiadó. ISBN 963-389-271-6.
- Zsoldos, Attila (2007). Családi ügy: IV. Béla és István ifjabb király viszálya az 1260-as években [A family affair: The Conflict between Béla IV and Junior King Stephen in the 1260s] (in Hungarian). História, MTA Történettudományi Intézete. ISBN 978-963-9627-15-4.
- Zsoldos, Attila (2011). Magyarország világi archontológiája, 1000–1301 [Secular Archontology of Hungary, 1000–1301] (in Hungarian). História, MTA Történettudományi Intézete. ISBN 978-963-9627-38-3.

Michael I Genus Rosd Born: ? Died: after 1277
Political offices
Preceded by Csák Hahót	Ispán of Nyitra; 1270–1273	Succeeded by James Bána
Preceded by James Bána	Ispán of Nyitra; 1274	Succeeded by James Bána
Preceded by James Bána	Ispán of Nyitra; 1274–1276	Succeeded by Peter Csák
Preceded by Thomas Hont-Pázmány	Ispán of Nyitra; 1277	Succeeded by Peter Csák
