= Concordat of 1169 =

The Concordat of 1169 was an agreement between the Kingdom of Hungary and the Papal States, signed by Stephen III of Hungary and Cardinal Manfred of Lavagna, the papal legate of Pope Alexander III in Veszprém or Esztergom in 1169.

Taking advantage of Hungary's difficult foreign policy situation, which in the previous years was embroiled in a war with neighboring Byzantine Empire, the pope persuaded Stephen III to agree to a concordat much more favorable to him, overriding the 1161 agreement that provided the Hungarian monarch with wide ecclesiastical government concessions.

== Background ==
When Pope Alexander III was elected in 1159, his legitimacy was contested by Holy Roman Emperor Frederick Barbarossa and his protégé Antipope Victor IV. In the following years, Alexander had to convince the most influential European monarchs one after another to recognize him as the only legitimate pope. In order to be recognized by King Géza II of Hungary, Pope Alexander offered the Hungarian monarch significant church government concessions. The concordat between Géza and Alexander was signed in 1161. According to the treaty, Géza promised that he would not depose or transfer prelates without the consent of the Holy See; on the other hand, the pope acknowledged that no papal legates could be sent to Hungary without the king's permission and the Hungarian prelates were only allowed to appeal to the Holy See with the king's consent.

Géza II died in May 1162. His fifteen-year-old son Stephen III ascended the Hungarian throne, but his two uncles, anti-kings Ladislaus II (1162–1163) then Stephen IV (1163), who had joined the court of the Byzantine Empire and enjoyed the support of Emperor Manuel I Komnenos, challenged his right to the crown. A civil war broke out between Stephen III and his uncles. The young monarch attempted to approach the Holy Roman Empire for Frederick's support; The Papal States was still an ally of the Byzantine Empire, thus Stephen III could not count on Pope Alexander's support against Manuel. Nonetheless, Stephen III did not acknowledge Victor IV as the legitimate pope and after the death of Frederick's protégé in 1164, he did not support the claim of Antipope Paschal III against Pope Alexander III. The army of Stephen III, along with German mercenaries, defeated his uncle Stephen IV in June 1163. Although Stephen III remained the only legitimate monarch in Hungary, the civil war was followed by a large-scale Byzantine invasion of Hungary. Stephen III was obliged to renounce Syrmia (Sirmium) in favor of the Byzantine Empire, but only after Manuel promised that he would never support his uncle Stephen IV. Clashes and border conflicts between Hungary and the Byzantium lasted until 1167, when Stephen III had to renounce Dalmatia, Croatia and Syrmia (the appanage of his younger brother Béla) to the Byzantine Empire.

== Hungary–Holy See relations in the 1160s ==
The relationship between Hungary and the Holy See remained strained during the reign of Stephen III. There were several reasons for this; first, Stephen III sought assistance from Emperor Frederick, Pope Alexander's enemy, during the war with the Byzantine Empire. The alliance, despite its reasonable military considerations, was strongly opposed by Lucas, Archbishop of Esztergom, head of the Hungarian church hierarchy and a staunch partisan of Alexander III. The pope, additionally, complained that celibacy was not universal among the prelates in Hungary. There is also evidence that suggests that Stephen III seized Church revenues to finance his war with the Byzantine Empire. As a result, Lucas' relationship worsened with his monarch sometime after 1165 or 1166, and resulted in leaving the royal court for years. The correspondence of Thomas Becket and John of Salisbury reveals that the principles of the Gregorian Reform were not fully introduced in Hungary "on account of the unbridled acts of tyranny by the seculars against the apostolic institutions" in the late 1160s. Stephen transferred Prodanus, Bishop of Zagreb from his diocese without consulting the Holy See, despite the fact that Géza II renounced his right of investiture in the Concordat of 1161.

Andrew was elected as Bishop of Győr by the cathedral chapter in 1169, as a candidate of Stephen III. However, despite the demand of both Pope Alexander and Stephen III, Archbishop Lucas attempted to hinder the consecration of Andrew, because of his allegedly non-canonical election, which plausibly occurred under the pressure of the king. The pope sent his papal legate Cardinal Manfred of Lavagna (Italian: Manfredo di Lavagna) to Hungary in the first half of 1169 with the mandate to implement Andrew's consecration, and, under the pretext of that, to settle the relationship between the Holy See and the Hungarian monarch, as well as the rights of the latter regarding the exercise of the investiture. It is also possible that Manfred arrived to the kingdom to strengthen the positions of the Archbishop of Esztergom against Stephen III, who pursued an anti-Gregorian church policy. For the sake of internal consolidation, Stephen III needed to settle his relationship with the papacy. Consequently, Stephen was forced to abandon his former ecclesiastical policy under the influence of Archbishop Lucas and Queen Mother Euphrosyne of Kiev.

With the participation of the papal legate, Archbishop Lucas convoked a national synod to Esztergom (called Third Council of Esztergom). According to historian Szabolcs Anzelm Szuromi, the negotiations there ended in an agreement which was ratified in the Concordat of 1169. Other historians – e.g. Gyula Pauler – considered the meeting of Stephen III and Manfred took place in Veszprém. Based on this interpretation, the king first agreed with the papal legate in front of important representatives of the clergy, and then left for Esztergom, where everything agreed with the legate was put on the agenda at the convened council. Both Stephen III and Manfred participated in this council. Based on this reasoning, according to Szuromi, it could be doubted that the concordat was created as a result of the national synod.

== Content ==
In the introduction to the document, Stephen III indicated that the agreement was aimed at solving the Hungarian church's backsliding situation, as well as settling those issues in which the Hungarian king's practice did not comply with church discipline, or in which it violated the rights of the Holy See. In addition to all this, the king acknowledged the papacy of Alexander III.

Similarly to his father Géza II, Stephen III promised that he would not depose or transfer prelates without the consent of the Holy See and renounced his right of investiture. Furthermore, the king, abandoning the practice of his predecessors, promised that he and his successors will no longer appoint secular custodians or governors to administer the dioceses after the death of a bishop, but only "honest clerics, who will receive a certain moderate share of the church income, not for their enjoyment, but for their living needs, and the rest will be fraud without, in good faith, they are obliged to use it for the repair of churches, bishops' and canons' houses, and for the relief of widows, the poor and orphans". Stephen also declared that he would no longer usurp and use any of these ecclesiastical properties for his own benefit, except if an enemy force invaded the country, but even then only in case of absolute necessity and with the consent of the bishops. In addition to the prelates, Stephen III also had to declare that he would not depose or transfer provosts and abbots from their positions without the consent of the Holy See, unless they have demonstrably committed a crime under canon law.

Chama, Archbishop of Kalocsa, all suffragan and elected bishops, royal provosts and abbots also promised to abandon their former custom of appointing and depriving provosts and other dignitaries and seizing other ecclesiastical property. This passage clearly confirmed the position of Archbishop Lucas of Esztergom, who is not mentioned here, at the head of the Hungarian ecclesiastical hierarchy, who in any case exercised jurisdiction over the royal churches. László Gálos argued Lucas' name was left out only because he had already demonstrated law-abiding behavior, and the document only sought to remedy existing abuses.

== Historiography ==
The original document was lost, but its text was preserved by papal chamberlain Cencius (future Pope Honorius III) in his work Liber Censuum in the early 13th century. Its copies are also found in the late 13th century versions of the biography of Pope Alexander III (Vita Alexandri III) written by Cardinal Boso.

Since the name of the monarch appears with the initial "B", it was previously believed that Béla III concluded the concordat with the pope in 1179. However, the text refers to the participation and consent of Queen Mother Euphrosyne, which can only refer to the political conditions existing at the time of Stephen III. Historian Gábor Thoroczkay argued that the initials "B" and "S" were often confused in the Gothic writing types of contemporary diplomas, so perhaps the copyist made a mistake. The document also preserved only the first letter of the name of Archbishop Chama – "C." or "Ch." –, and 17th-century French scholar Felix Contelorus unlocked the abbreviation with "Cosmas" in his work "Acta concordiae Alexandri III. Pontificis cum Frederico imperatore" (1632). This solution was often adopted incorrectly by many scholarly works in the next centuries (for instance, even the study of Sándor Hunyadi in 2016). Walter Map narrates in his work De nugis curialium that Archbishop Lucas reconciled with Stephen III a year before the latter's death. Consequently, Gyula Pauler considered the concordat was concluded and signed in 1171. Slovak historian Richard Marsina emphasized the English chronicler, who obtained his information secondhand, should not be given such chronological credit. Tamás Körmendi argued that the inveterate Gregorian prelate Lucas could quarrel with the king again after 1169 (perhaps because Stephen III and Euphrosyne did not comply with the provisions of the concordat).

Despite the fact that the document was written in the name of the king, it bears expressions and style characteristic of the Roman Curia's diploma issuing activity. Therefore, historians János Győry and György Györffy considered the concordat as a non-authentic forgery. Győry rejected the existence of the concordat too; in his opinion, Stephen III did not give privileges to Pope Alexander III, but to the Hungarian Roman Catholic Church. He argued, the document was fabricated in Rome decades later, which was drafted for the pope only for domestic use. Györffy, who considered the agreement took place in 1171, did not rule out the possibility that an existing agreement was subsequently written down in an apocryphal way. Other group of historians – e.g. Walter Holtzmann, László Gálos, László Mezey and András Kubinyi – argued the concordat was formulated by Cardinal Manfred and his professional staff, and precisely these papal stylistic features prove the authenticity of the document. Gálos emphasized, as a result of the concordat, the canonical election became established and widespread in Hungary.

== Aftermath ==
In the following centuries, the concordat is not referred to at all in the correspondence between Hungarian kings and popes, when a conflict of jurisdiction arose regarding an ecclesiastical appointment or benefice. Historian Sándor Hunyadi argued Hartvik's hagiography of Saint Stephen I of Hungary (which was declared as the official hagiography of the king by Pope Innocent III in 1201) contributed to the disappearance of the concordat from historical memory, since it granted much more complete rights to the Hungarian monarchs, who consciously referred to the "document" granting the most complete rights, and had no intention of destroying their own argument with the limitations set out in the Concordat of 1169.

There are occasional references to knowledge of the text of the concordat. When Charles I of Hungary expropriated several castles, possessions and benefices from the Archdiocese of Kalocsa after the death of Ladislaus Jánki, he defended his actions in a letter to Pope Benedict XII in 1339 by saying that the neighboring king of Serbia threatened the archiepiscopal estates, so it became necessary to occupy the archbishop's castles with royal troops. The argument of Charles I is in line with the passage of the Concordat of 1169 concerning national defense. However, the condition of the bishops' consent was already missing from his argument.

== Sources ==
- Hunyadi, Sándor (2016). "Magyarország és a pápaság egyezményei az 1160-as években [The Agreements between Hungary and the Papacy in the 1160s]". Fons (in Hungarian). 23 (1). Szentpétery Imre Történettudományi Alapítvány: 119–143. ISSN 1217-8020.
- Hunyadi, Sándor (2024). "Ismerték-e az 1161. és az 1169. évi konkordátumokat I. Károly korában? Gondolatok egy 1339. évi adat nyomán [Were the concordats of 1161 and 1169 known in the time of Charles I? Thoughts based on data from 1339]". In Hunyadi, Sándor; et al. (eds.). Micae Mediaevales XIII (in Hungarian). Eötvös Loránd University. pp. 63–75. ISSN 2062-2198.
- Kádár, Tamás (2018). "A külföldi uralkodóházak tagjai, a külhoni hűbéres fejedelmek, valamint az egyházi főméltóságok és a pápai legátusok tartózkodásai Magyarországon 1000–1205 között [The Stays of Members of Foreign Ruling Houses, Foreign Vassal Princes, Ecclesiastical Dignitaries and Papal Legates in Hungary between 1000 and 1205]". Történeti Tanulmányok. Acta Universitatis Debreceniensis (in Hungarian). 26: 6–83. ISSN 1217-4602.
- Körmendi, Tamás (2003). "Lukács [Lucas]". In Beke, Margit (ed.). Esztergomi érsekek 1001–2003 [Archbishops of Esztergom 1001–2003] (in Hungarian). Szent István Társulat. pp. 59–72. ISBN 963-361-472-4.
- Makk, Ferenc (1989). The Árpáds and the Comneni: Political Relations between Hungary and Byzantium in the 12th century (Translated by György Novák). Akadémiai Kiadó. ISBN 963-05-5268-X.
- Szovák, Kornél (1996). "Pápai–magyar kapcsolatok a 12. században [Papal–Hungarian Relations in the 12th Century]". In Zombori, István (ed.). Magyarország és a Szentszék kapcsolatának 1000 éve [One Thousand Years of the Contacts between Hungary and the Holy See] (in Hungarian). Magyar Egyháztörténeti Enciklopédia Munkaközösség. pp. 21–46. ISBN 963-8472-17-0.
- Szuromi, Szabolcs Anzelm (1999). "Az első három Esztergomi Zsinat és a magyarországi egyházfegyelem a XII. században [The First Three Synods of Esztergom and Church Discipline in Hungary in the 12th Century]". Magyar Könyvszemle (in Hungarian). 115 (4): 377–409. ISSN 0025-0171.
- Thoroczkay, Gábor, ed. (2018). Írott források az 1116–1205 közötti magyar történelemről [Written Sources of the Hungarian History between 1116 and 1205] (in Hungarian). Szegedi Középkorász Műhely. ISBN 978-615-80398-3-3.
