= Stephen I (archbishop of Kalocsa) =

Hungarian bishop

Stephen
- Archbishop of Kalocsa
- Installed: 1171 or later
- Term ended: 1176
- Predecessor: Chama
- Successor: Andrew

Personal details
- Died: after 1176
- Denomination: Roman Catholic

Stephen (Hungarian: István; died after 1176) was a Hungarian prelate in the twelfth century, who served as Archbishop of Kalocsa in the first half of the 1170s. As one of the confidants of the pretender Géza, he strongly opposed the rule of King Béla III, who therefore deprived from his dignity in 1176.

== Career ==
Church historian József Udvardy identified his person with that certain Stephen, who served as chancellor and royal chaplain for queen mother Euphrosyne of Kiev in 1163, when issued the royal charter of Stephen III, who confirmed the privileges of the Archdiocese of Split. Stephen was also styled as member (or presumably provost) of the collegiate chapter of Titel by the document.

The archiepiscopal tenure of Stephen was mentioned only by one of the entries of the Annales Posonienses under the year 1187. Accordingly, he was deprived from his dignity in that year. Early scholars, including György Pray and István Katona accepted the data without doubt and interpreted the term "deponitur" as the burial of Stephen. József Udvardy examined other events that were recorded during that year's entry and put the correct date to 1176. Accordingly, Stephen belonged to those magnates and prelates, including Queen Euphrosyne, who supported the claim of Duke Géza to the Hungarian throne against his elder brother Béla III, who arrived from the Byzantine Empire to ascend the kingship. Béla's coronation took place on 18 January 1173, performed by an unidentified Archbishop of Kalocsa (possibly Chama), thus Stephen definitely did not yet hold the position during that time, in accordance with Udvardy's narration. Béla imprisoned his younger brother, but Géza escaped from prison and fled to Austria in 1174 or 1175. It is possible that Stephen accompanied the pretender, along with the former judge royal Lawrence. Later, Géza tried to persuade Soběslav II of Bohemia to help him meet Frederick I, Holy Roman Emperor against Béla III, but Soběslav seized Géza and handed him over to the Hungarian king in 1176 or 1177. His faithful partisan, comes Vata was blinded, while Archbishop Stephen was officially deprived from his dignity around the same time. His successor, Andrew was transferred from the Diocese of Győr to the Archbishopric of Kalocsa in 1176 (it is possible that he was elected in the absence of Stephen, who fled Hungary by that time).

According to historian Ferenc Makk, the author of the Annales Posonienses, mixing up the name and dating the event over ten years later, in fact recorded the temporary disposal of Archbishop Andrew by Béla III around 1178 and such "Archbishop Stephen" never existed. Nevertheless, historian Attila Zsoldos accepted Udvardy's argument and added the name of Stephen with the year 1176 in his archontology.

== Sources ==
- Makk, Ferenc (1989). The Árpáds and the Comneni: Political Relations between Hungary and Byzantium in the 12th century (Translated by György Novák). Akadémiai Kiadó. ISBN 963-05-5268-X.
- Thoroczkay, Gábor, ed. (2018). Írott források az 1116–1205 közötti magyar történelemről [Written Sources of the Hungarian History between 1116 and 1205] (in Hungarian). Szegedi Középkorász Műhely. ISBN 978-615-80398-3-3.
- Udvardy, József (1991). A kalocsai érsekek életrajza (1000–1526) [Biographies of Archbishops of Kalocsa, 1000–1526] (in Hungarian). Görres Gesellschaft.
- Zsoldos, Attila (2011). Magyarország világi archontológiája, 1000–1301 [Secular Archontology of Hungary, 1000–1301] (in Hungarian). História, MTA Történettudományi Intézete. ISBN 978-963-9627-38-3.

Catholic Church titles
Preceded by Chama	Archbishop of Kalocsa c. 1176	Succeeded by Andrew
