= Lucas (archbishop of Esztergom) =

Hungarian prelate and diplomat

- Archbishop of Esztergom
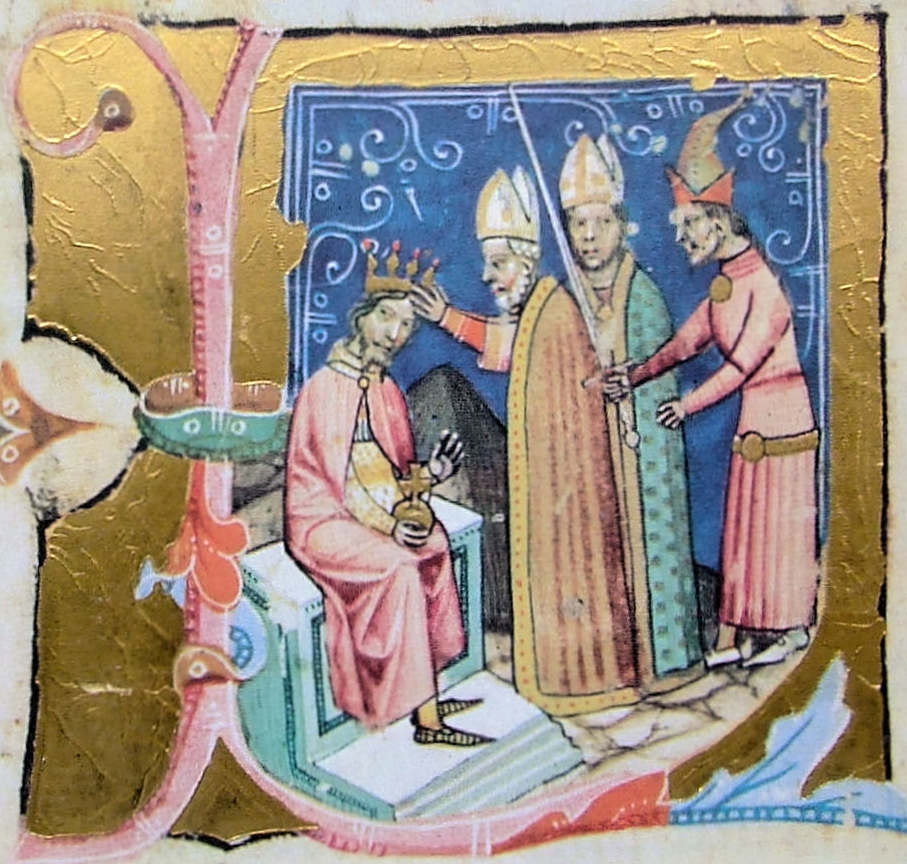
- Stephen III is crowned king by Lucas (from the Illuminated Chronicle)
- Installed: 1158
- Term ended: 1181
- Predecessor: Martyrius
- Successor: Nicholas
- Other post: Bishop of Eger

Orders
- Consecration: early 1157 by Pope Adrian IV

Personal details
- Born: c. 1120
- Died: 1181
- Denomination: Roman Catholic
- Education: University of Paris

Lucas (Hungarian: Lukács; c. 1120 – 1181), also known as Luke, was a Hungarian prelate and diplomat in the 12th century. He was Bishop of Eger between 1156 and 1158, and Archbishop of Esztergom from 1158 until his death in 1181.

Lucas is believed to have come from a wealthy and influential family, but sources are uncertain of his origin. He was one of the first students of the University of Paris. When he returned to Hungary, his ecclesiastical career ascended quickly into the highest dignities. As a confidant of Géza II in his last years, Lucas had a significant impact on the country's foreign policy and diplomatic processes. Lucas was a staunch supporter of Stephen III during the struggles in the Árpád dynasty following Géza II's death, where Stephen III's reign was contested by his two uncles. The archbishop opposed both the intervention efforts of the Byzantine Empire and the Holy Roman Empire. Lucas had an ambivalent relationship with Stephen's brother and successor Béla III. The strict and uncompromising nature of his extremist Gregorianism challenged and weakened his partnership and alliance with the Holy See in the last decade of his archiepiscopal tenure, which coincided with the pontificate of Pope Alexander III.

== Ancestry ==
Lucas is said to have been born to a wealthy and illustrious noble family in the early 1120s, but his origin is uncertain and undetermined. His brother was Apa (or Appa), a powerful lord in the royal court of Géza II of Hungary. Apa came into prominence after the fall of Beloš, and served as the ispán of Bodrog County in 1156 and then as the Ban of Slavonia from around 1157 to 1158. According to an inauthentic charter he was also Judge royal in 1158.

From the 18th century onwards, several historians and genealogists attempted to connect Lucas and his brother Apa to various notable genera (clans) in the Kingdom of Hungary. András Lehotzky and Iván Nagy proposed that Lucas was a member of the Bánfi (Bánffy; lit. "son of a ban") de Alsólendva family, originating from the Hahót clan, while other historians proposed he descended from the Bánfi (Bánffy) branches of the Tomaj and Gutkeled clans. Nándor Knauz called him "Lucas Bánffy de Alsó Lindva de genere Guthkeled" in his work, the Monumenta ecclesiae Strigoniensis (1874), whose proposal is faulty. Aside from surnames being anachronisms for the time, the Felsőlendvais were the ones who originated from the Gutkeled clan (and there is no such "Bánffy de Felsőlendva" kinship) instead of the Bánffys de Alsólendva. Both families adopted their surname in the 14th century after their distinguished members, Nicholas Gutkeled and Nicholas Hahót respectively, bore the title of ban. Historian Ubul Kállay rejected the aforementioned theories and argued Apa and Lucas were the sons of Alexius, a Ban of Slavonia during the reign of Stephen II of Hungary. Therefore, Kállay referred to Lucas with the surname "Bánfi" anachronistically and theorised he was a member of the Gutkeled clan and brother of Martin Gutkeled, who erected the Benedictine abbey of Csatár. Later academic works and historians – including Gyula Pauler, Bálint Hóman, Gyula Kristó and Ferenc Makk – refer to him as simply "Archbishop Lucas".

== Education and early career ==
"I saw at Paris, in the school of Master Gerard la Pucelle, Luke of Hungary, a man of honour and great culture, who shared his table with the poor in such a way that they seemed invited guests, not seekers of alms."

— Walter Map: De nugis curialium

From around 1150 to 1156, Lucas studied at the University of Paris, where he was a student of Gerard la Pucelle, a scholar of canon law and later the Bishop of Coventry. He was one of the first Hungarians who attended a foreign university and the first known Hungarian alumnus of the newly established University of Paris. He acquired a high degree in church law and earned the respect of the other students there. Lucas could be the first Hungarian cleric who became familiar with Decretum Gratiani, an early-mid 12th century collection of canon law compiled as a legal textbook. Among his fellow pupils was supposedly English chronicler Walter Map (Gualterius Mappus), who recalled Lucas in his only surviving work De nugis curialium. He described Lucas as a highly educated man and a gracious Christian; he stated that Lucas unselfishly shared his goods and meals with his fellow students. Map added that Lucas had his own accommodation and personnel within the university (supporting his upper-class origins) and gladly made donations. However, Map (born around 1140) was definitely younger than Lucas and attended the school a decade later in the 1160s, suggesting that he heard the anecdote secondhand.

As a student, Lucas established productive relationships with English scholars and clerics like John of Salisbury. In the following decades, John of Salisbury and Walter Map became acquainted with Thomas Becket, a significant and powerful prelate in 12th-century England. Historian György Györffy compared their careers and found several similarities between the pro-papal activities of Lucas and Thomas Becket in the upcoming decades. According to Györffy, they did not know each other personally (Thomas Becket was a secretary of Theobald of Bec by the time Lucas resided in Paris), but they knew about each other through mutual acquaintances and used similar ecclesiastical tools to defend their interests against the secular royal power. As Map narrated in his anecdote about Lucas, Hugh of le Mans, Bishop of Acre informed him about Lucas' later encounters with the warring Árpád dynasty of Hungary, which Becket learned through Map.

When he returned to Hungary, Lucas was elected Bishop of Eger in 1156. He was still referred to as bishop-elect throughout in 1156 until March 1157. When Gervasius, Bishop of Győr interceded with Géza II to grant the right to collect salt to the Archdiocese of Esztergom at Nána and Kakat (present-day Štúrovo, Slovakia), he was addressed as bishop during his act as witness to the document. His election was confirmed by Pope Adrian IV in the previous weeks. Due to a lack of sources, there is no record of Lucas' activity or function as the Bishop of Eger; his name only appears in the list of dignitaries of the various royal charters issued by Géza II. In 1157 political unrest occurred in Hungary; chronicler Rahewin records that King Géza II's youngest brother, Stephen, began conspiring with their ambitious uncle, Beloš, and other lords against the monarch. Géza II expelled his rebellious brother and sentenced him to death, while Beloš lost his influence over the royal court and fled Hungary in the latter half of the year. His departure resulted in Apa's political ascent to the position of Ban of Slavonia in late 1157. It is plausible Apa supported the growth of Lucas' ecclesiastical career and had a role in his brother's return to Hungary. After their failed rebellion, Géza II's two brothers, Ladislaus and Stephen sought refuge in the Byzantine Empire by 1160, where they found shelter in the court of Emperor Manuel I Komnenos at Constantinople.

== Archbishop of Esztergom ==
=== Influence over Géza II ===
[...] "As I see your heart filled with the advancement and unity of the Church, may I also contribute to this by reporting to Your Excellency that Our Lord King [Géza II], allowing my requests, accepted and confirmed Lord Alexander [as Pope] altogether with Our whole Church. In making this final decision, we persevered in the matter and have already sent to Lord Alexander the King's letter, along with my insignificance's letter. And further, if we can please your Holiness something, tell me and that I am willing to obey in accordance with my talent."

— Archbishop Lucas' letter (missilis) to Archbishop Eberhard of Salzburg in 1161

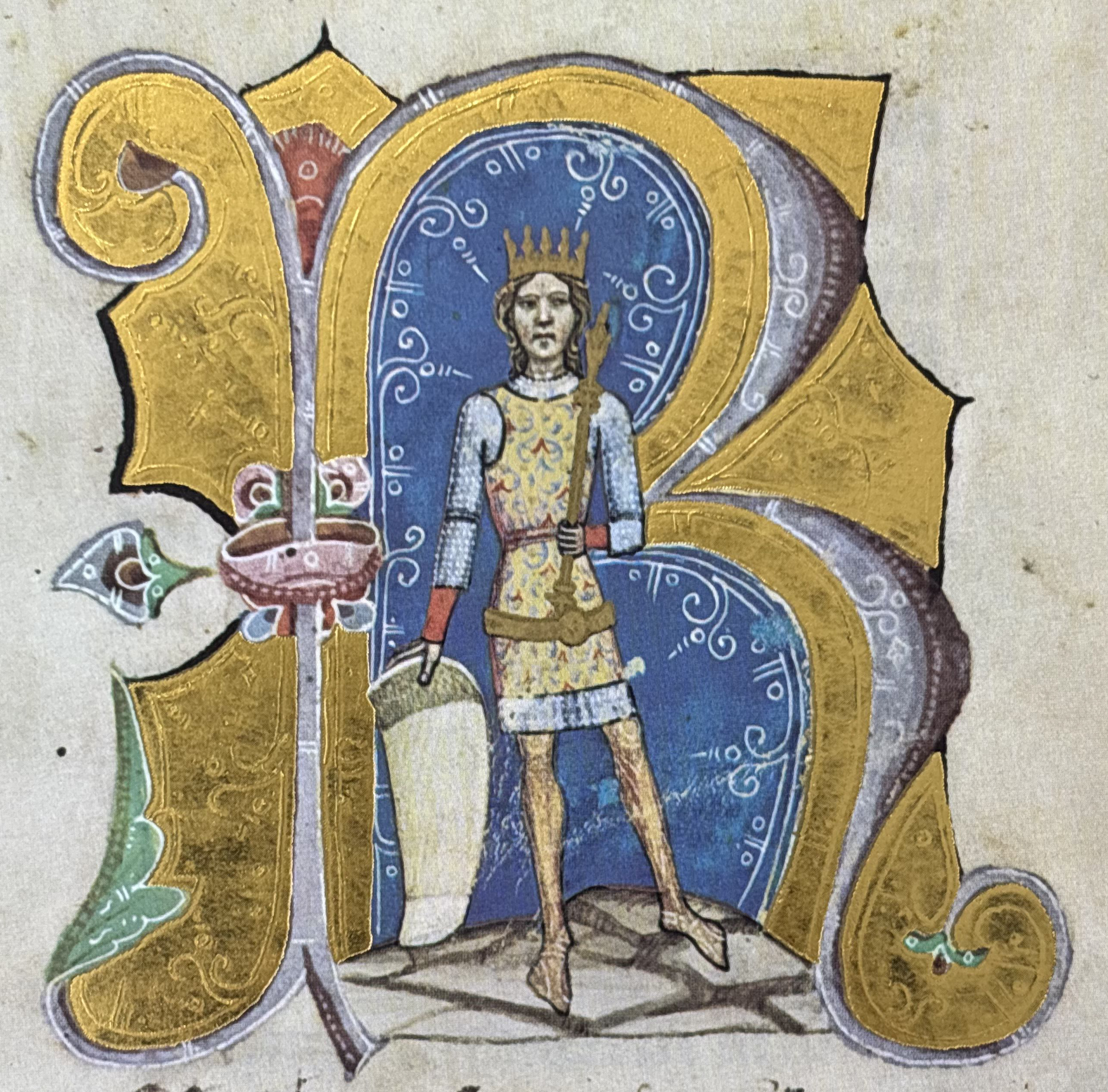
Géza II of Hungary (r. 1141–1162)

Martyrius, Archbishop of Esztergom died in the spring of 1158 and was soon succeeded by Lucas. Apa and Lucas became the strongest proponents of Géza II during his last regnal years and respectively held the most distinguished secular and ecclesiastical dignities. When the king made a donation in favor of the Cathedral of Saint Domnius and its archbishop Gaudius twice in 1158, the brothers only appeared in his accompaniment by name. Lucas' sympathized with the reformist wing in the Roman Curia, which also affected Géza II's foreign policies in the following years. He was dubbed as the "representative of extreme Gregorianism" in Hungary by later scholars. As theologian József Török expressed, Lucas "vigilantly guarded the interests of the legitimate Pope [Alexander III] and the Church" during his first years as archbishop. He was one of the first Hungarian prelates who thought on a whole European and Christian universalist scale and integrated into the contemporary mainstream school of clerical theology. Literary historian János Győry suggested that Lucas sympathized with the heretic movements prevalent in the region – Albigensians, Patarenes and Bogomils, but the majority of scholars do not share this fringe theory.

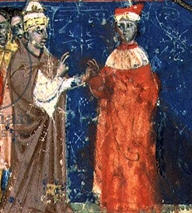
Pope Alexander III meets his rival Frederick Barbarossa

Initially, Géza II supported the efforts of Frederick Barbarossa against the pro-papal Italian communes (that were later known collectively as the Lombard League), and even sent Hungarian auxiliary troops to accompany the Holy Roman Emperor to Italy between 1158 and 1160. Barbarossa forced the Italian towns to surrender in September 1158. However, Milan and Crema openly rebelled against the emperor's rule after the Diet of Roncaglia ordered the restoration of imperial rights. Géza II sent his envoys to Barbarossa's camp and promised to dispatch further reinforcements against the rebellious towns. The death of Pope Adrian IV on 1 September 1159 divided the college of the cardinals: the majority of the cardinals opposed Barbarossa while a minority supported him. The first group elected Alexander III as pope, but Barbarossa's supporters chose Victor IV instead. Barbarossa convened a synod to Pavia to end the schism. Géza II sent his envoys to the church council where Victor IV was declared the lawful pope in February 1160. However, Archbishop-elect Lucas remained loyal to Alexander III and persuaded Géza II to start negotiations with Alexander III's representatives. Géza II switched allegiances after most of the other European monarchs joined Alexander III. Géza II's envoys announced his decision to Alexander III in early 1161, but he only informed the emperor of his recognition of Alexander III in the autumn of the same year. A letter from Lucas to his ally, Eberhard, Archbishop of Salzburg, who was the leading pro-Alexander figure in the Holy Roman Empire, revealed his influence carried significant weight with Géza II when he changed the direction of his foreign policy. Lucas presented the case as if he alone had been responsible for Géza II's recognition of Pope Alexander, as he wrote "I have managed through appeals to cause our Lord the King and our whole church to accept Alexander". Several historians – including Gyula Pauler and József Gerics – accepted the letter's contents and considered Lucas' significant role in negotiating with the pro-Barbarossa envoy, Bishop Daniel of Prague in 1161 at Easter before Daniel's official meeting with Géza II. However, Ferenc Makk notes there is no other source which emphasises Lucas' role in the events beside his own letter.

Géza II and Pope Alexander III's envoy, papal legate Pietro di Miso signed a concordat in the summer of 1161 that Lucas mediated. It guaranteed that Géza II would not depose or transfer prelates without the consent of the Holy See, the Holy See could not send papal legates to Hungary without the king's permission, and Hungarian prelates were only allowed to appeal to the Holy See with the king's consent. Pope Alexander, who was fully aware of Lucas' allegiance and foreign policy activities, showed his appreciation by sending Lucas the archiepiscopal pallium in July 1161, confirming that Lucas' election occurred three years earlier. According to a decretal of Pope Alexander III issued in 1167 or 1168, when the papal legate, cardinal Pietro di Miso was sent to Hungary to hand over the pallium to Lucas, the archbishop's brother "Alban" (most scholars identified him with Apa) provided a horse for the legate when Pietro and his escort entered the Hungarian border via Dalmatia across the Adriatic Sea. The letter stated that Archbishop Lucas worried this step could be seen as simony in the Roman Curia. Pope Alexander reassured the prelate with Biblical phrases and warned Lucas not to disturb him with trivial matters. The decretal, which later became part of Decretales Gregorii IX (or Liber extra), reflects Lucas' rigid individuality, excessive strictness, and extreme Gregorian views which characterized his reign as Archbishop of Esztergom.

18th-century historian Miklós Schmitth notes that Lucas successfully recovered the stolen gems of the late Martyrius from the thief Jordanus immediately after being elected as archbishop. According to a royal charter supposedly issued by Stephen III, Géza II ordered Ded of Vác and Chama of Eger to rededicate the Szentjobb Abbey (present-day Sâniob in Romania) with Lucas' consent. It also stated that the Benedictine monastery of Szentjobb was attacked and plundered by the sons of a certain "Palatine Paul" thereafter; as a result, Archbishop Lucas excommunicated them. Historian Tamás Körmendi questioned the validity of the issuance, which suffers from 18th-century misinterpretations, explanations, anachronisms, and factual errors.

=== Dynastic struggles ===
[...] "The aforesaid King of Hungary [Géza II] died, leaving as heir a young son, a very little boy [Stephen III] at the time. Then the king's brother [Ladislaus II] came to Archbishop Luke, demanding from him both installation and coronation. Luke reproved this man and accused him of treachery for ignoring law and custom and right, in his efforts to disinherit the innocent and he refused to consent. But the uncle had himself made king by another archbishop of the kingdom [Mikó of Kalocsa], who had no authority for such a coronation. It was as if the usurper had said: »if I cannot move the powers above, I will solicit those of hell« [a quote from Virgil's Aeneid]. He was immediately visited with anathema by Luke, whom he forthwith urged with dreadful threats and even with the menace of a naked sword to absolve him; but, receiving for an answer scorn and like-wise excommunication, he thrust the Archbishop violently into prison and compelled the suspended churches to disregard the interdict."

— Walter Map: De nugis curialium

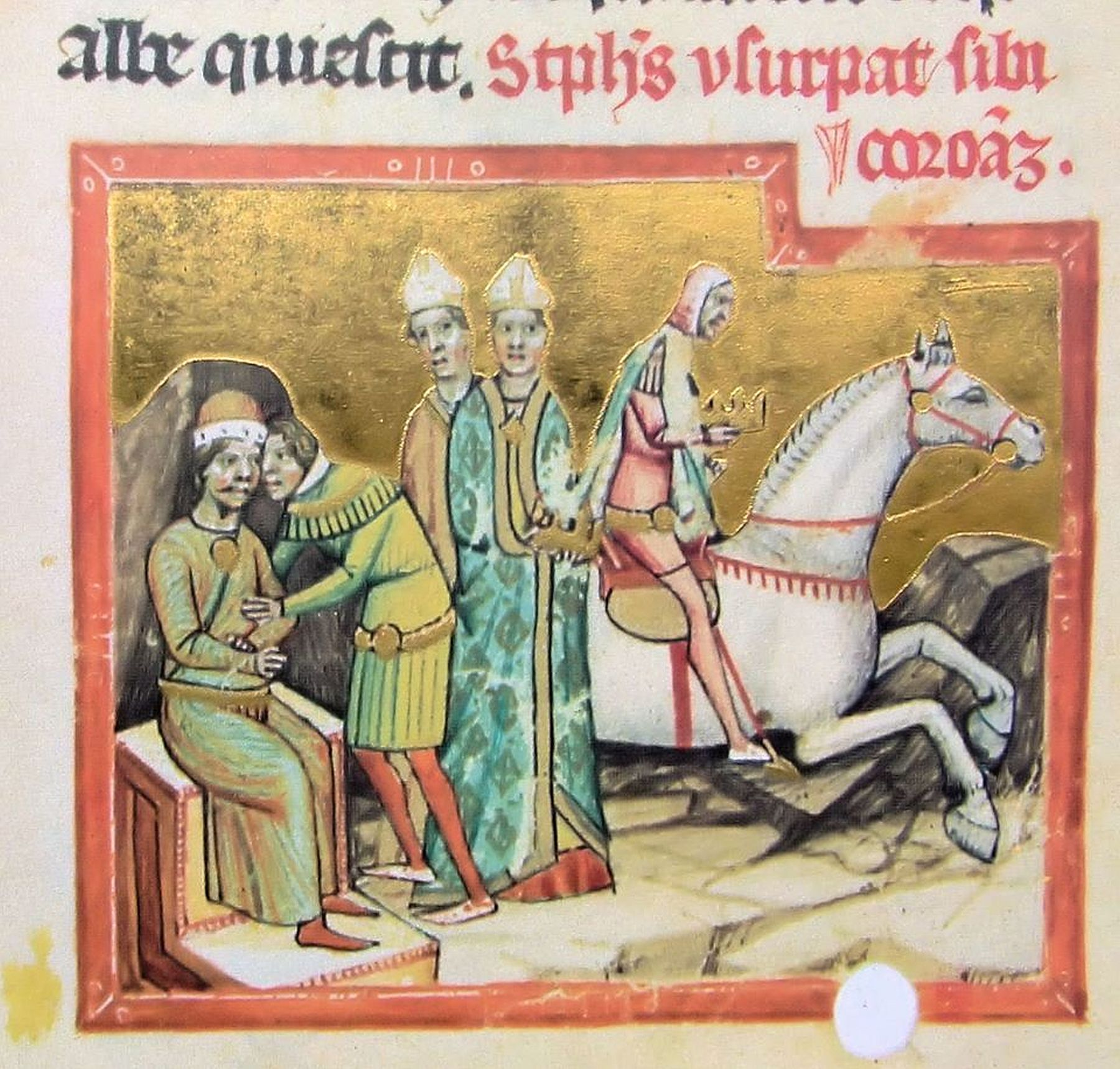
Ladislaus II, steals the crown (the throne) from his nephew, Stephen III (from the Illuminated Chronicle)

Géza II died unexpectedly on 31 May 1162. Archbishop Lucas crowned Géza II's elder son, 15-year-old Stephen III king without delay in early June in Székesfehérvár. Immediately after the coronation, Byzantine Emperor Manuel, who attempted to extend his influence over the neighboring kingdom, dispatched an army to Hungary which advanced as far as Haram (now Ram, Serbia) and sent envoys to Hungary to promote the claim of the young monarch's namesake uncle to the Hungarian throne. Most of the lords opposed Stephen as their king because of his familial relationship with Manuel. The magnates decided to accept Stephen's uncle, Ladislaus II, as a "compromise candidate" between being bribed by the Byzantines and being afraid of a potential invasion by the Emperor. Stephen III's army was routed at Kapuvár and he fled from Hungary and sought refuge in Austria six weeks after his coronation.

Archbishop Lucas stayed in Hungary after the Byzantine intervention and was one of the few who remained loyal to Stephen and refused to crown Ladislaus; as a result, Mikó, Archbishop of Kalocsa performed the ceremony in July 1162, despite the coronation of the Hungarian monarch being the Archbishop of Esztergom's responsibility for centuries. Lucas considered Ladislaus II to be an usurper and excommunicated him through his envoy, declaring that he had unlawfully seized the crown from his nephew. Lucas also excommunicated his fellow archbishop Mikó for his participation in the process. As Makk noted, the legal basis for Lucas to impose ecclesiastical punishment against Ladislaus II was provided by Article 17 of St. Stephen's Second Code and Article 2 of the so-called Second Synod of Esztergom during the reign of Coloman. According to Map's De nugis curialium, the new monarch tried to intimidate and persuade the prelate to his side, but Lucas remained steadfast and strongly condemned his controversial accession to the Hungarian throne. In response the archbishop was arrested and imprisoned shortly thereafter.

"Since Luke's imprisonment long continued, a friend of his brought secretly to him in prison orders for his liberation from Pope Alexander addressed to the king, but these Luke was utterly unwilling to use when he heard that they had cost twelve denari — the wonted price for a bull — the good man declaring that he would not be delivered by simony. But the Lord opened his prison on Easter Day [in fact, Christmas] while the king was at a solemn mass. Then Luke entered the chapel with all men agape, and, having uncovered the altar and cast aside its ornaments, he thus spoke in the presence of the cross and in the hearing of the king, who was dazed with fear: »O Lord Jesus, whose resurrection no men but Christians proclaim, through that sovereign virtue by which Thou arose from the dead, if Thou deemest this king deserving of Thy visitation, "overthrow the wicked that he be no more" [Prov. 12,7]; but if not, at least let him feel, within forty days in Thy strong right hand which smote Pharaoh, the power of Him whom this marf hath pierced [Jhn. 19,37].« Upon leaving the chapel he was committed by his evil keepers to closer confinements, but bore all things with patience, never relaxing his vigilance in prayers and in praise of the Lord. And it came to pass that before the fortieth day the king died impenitent. His only brother, his peer in brutal passion, succeeded him. Luke granted to this man too a forty day respite and then slew him among his people "with the spirit of his mouth." [2Thess 2,8] He then installed the youthful heir with all ceremony."

— Walter Map: De nugis curialium

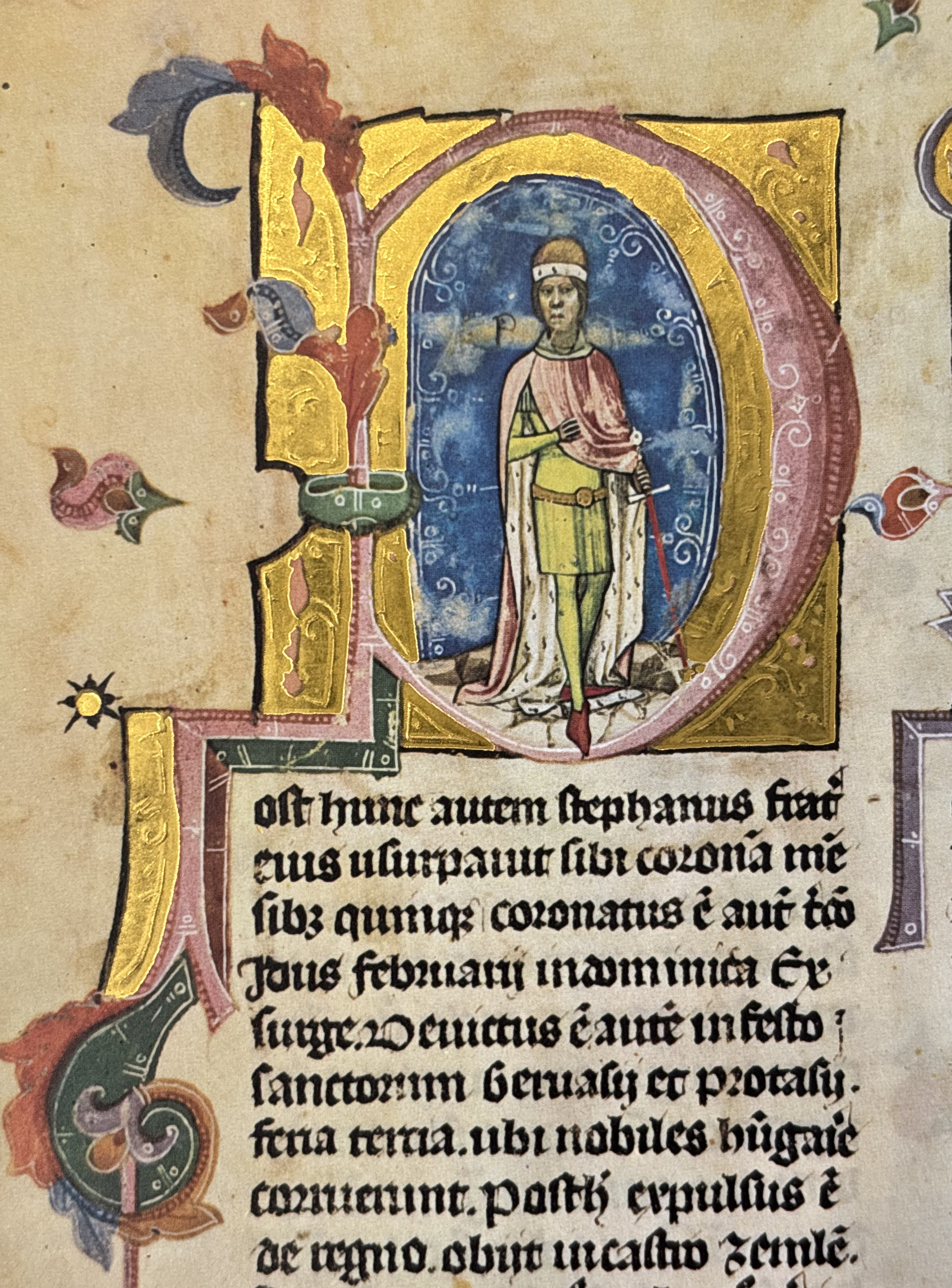
Stephen IV depicted in the Illuminated Chronicle

Ladislaus II attempted to reconcile himself with his opponents and released Archbishop Lucas at Christmas at Pope Alexander III's request. Map preserved the circumstances of his release (see above). However, Lucas did not yield to him, continued to support Stephen III, and became a central figure of Ladislaus' domestic opposition. His obstinate resistance indicated that any possibility of a reconciliation between the partisans of Stephen III and Ladislaus II was lost. Lucas did not recognize the legitimacy of Ladislaus' rule and organised the possibility of an open rebellion against the pro-Byzantine regime. Lucas' political interests conflicted with Pope Alexander's, who maintained a moderately good relationship with the courts of Ladislaus II and Emperor Manuel on account of the constant threat of Barbarossa's anti-papal policy. Church historian József Török argues Lucas saw the consistent and exclusive application of the ancient custom of primogeniture as the pledge of the stability of the kingdom, which was endangered by the ambitions of Ladislaus and Stephen. Lucas spoke of the negative example of the Byzantine Empire, which experienced civil wars, dynastic struggles, cognate murders and anarchy. Lucas' resistance led Ladislaus to imprison him again within days. Meanwhile, Stephen III returned to Hungary with an army and captured Pressburg (present-day Bratislava in Slovakia). Soon after, Ladislaus II died suddenly on 14 January 1163. Many of his contemporaries considered Lucas' curse as a contributing factor to his death.

Stephen III could not take the crown after his uncle's death because his other uncle, Stephen IV (Ladislaus II's brother), acceded to the throne. Archbishop Lucas refused to crown him and remained in custody. The coronation was performed again by Archbishop Mikó on 27 January. Lucas excommunicated Stephen IV and declared his rule illegal. Stephen IV's unveiled support for the interests of the Byzantine Empire caused discontent among the Hungarian barons. Stephen III mustered an army of barons who had deserted his uncle and supplemented it with German mercenaries. He defeated his uncle at Székesfehérvár on 19 June 1163. Stephen IV was captured, but his nephew released him, at Lucas's advice, on the condition that he never return to Hungary. According to Henry of Mügeln's chronicle, Lucas was freed from prison by then.

=== Stephen III's reign ===
"Luke guided the boyhood of the young king [Stephen III] to a most peaceful conclusion, but he was less successful during his youth. For when the king became a young man, he entertained loftier projects than he could possibly sustain, and, after the failure of his own means, he refrained not from consuming so the possessions of the Church. When Luke, after many tearful warnings, still found him willful and headstrong, he, weeping all the while, subjected the youth to anathema. Finally, by many prayers raised to Heaven, Luke gained for the king God's grace, so that he was turned to true repentance and hastened to the church of Gran [Esztergom] to give Luke the satisfaction for which he yearned. Luke, attended by all the clergy and a festive throng of people, came to meet him with open joy and welcomed him with full absolution. While others were merrily singing, Luke wept in secret. Then the king asked: »What is it, dearest father, that maketh thee weep amid such general rejoicing?« And Luke replied, »How can I rejoice, forsooth, when on this very day next year, amid our passionate distress, thou wilt be borne into this very place a dead man?« And so it came to pass."

— Walter Map: De nugis curialium

The dethroned Stephen IV first fled to the Holy Roman Empire, but left shortly afterwards for the Byzantine Empire, where Emperor Manuel promised him support. The Byzantine Emperor sent an army to Hungary to help Stephen IV regain the throne from his nephew. Large-scale military campaigns characterized the following years; Lucas, along with the Dowager Queen Euphrosyne, advised Stephen III throughout his reign. After a peace treaty with Emperor Manuel, Stephen III agreed to send his younger brother, Béla, to Constantinople and to allow the Byzantines to seize Béla's duchy, which included Croatia, Dalmatia and Sirmium. In an attempt to recapture these territories, Stephen III waged wars against the Byzantine Empire between 1164 and 1167, but could not defeat the Byzantines.

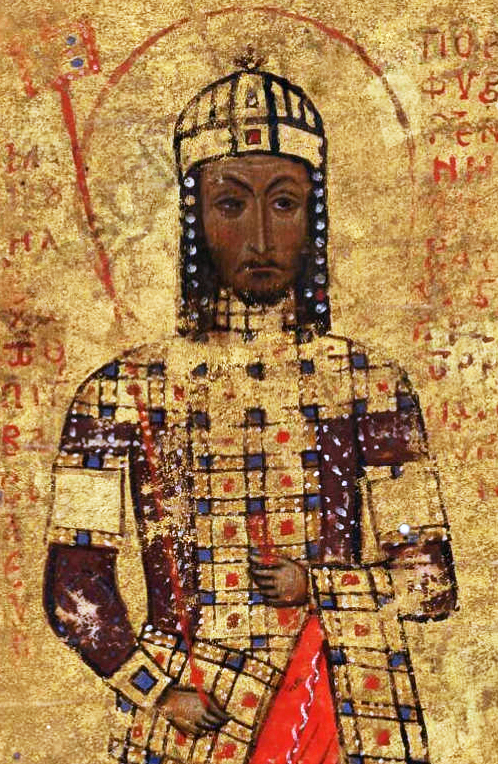
Byzantine Emperor Manuel I Komnenos

During the war with the Byzantine Empire, Stephen III sought assistance from Emperor Frederick, Pope Alexander's enemy. The alliance, despite its reasonable military considerations, was strongly opposed by Lucas and the pope, who requested Lucas via Archbishop Eberhard of Salzburg to prevent Stephen III from seeking military help from the Holy Roman Empire. Pope Alexander, additionally, complained that celibacy was not universal among the prelates in Hungary. There is also evidence that suggests that Stephen III seized Church revenues to finance his war with the Byzantine Empire. As a result, Lucas' relationship worsened with his monarch sometime after 1165 or 1166, and resulted in leaving the royal court for years. The royal chapel, which was responsible for drafting and issuing royal diplomas under the guidance of the Archbishop of Esztergom, ceased its operations during Lucas' voluntary withdrawal. His notary Becen remained loyal to him, and only three royal charters were preserved between 1166 and 1169; as only church employees were the only ones able to read and write, the lower number of charters drafted represented the temporary decline of literacy.

Pope Alexander sent his legate Cardinal Manfred to Hungary in 1169, who discussed the debated issues with the king, the queen mother, and the prelates. Manfred and Lucas convened a synod to Esztergom (called Third Council of Esztergom). The negotiations ended in an agreement that prohibited the monarch from arbitrarily deposing or relocating the prelates or confiscating their property. Stephen III also acknowledged Alexander as the legitimate pope. Makk wrote Archbishop Lucas was one of the key drafters of the concordat.

However the pope supported Stephen III against Lucas when the archbishop attempted to hinder the consecration of the king's protégé, Andrew, Bishop-elect of Győr, because of his allegedly non-canonical election. Although Manfred admonished Lucas to celebrate Andrew's consecration, he refused to do so, demonstrating that his relationship with the Holy See was no longer harmonious by the end of the 1160s. A letter issued by the pope around March 1179 stated that sometime after 1169, Archbishop Lucas excommunicated Stephen III and Queen Euphrosyne because of an "insignificant subterfuge". Archbishop Lucas reconciled with Stephen III around March 1171, according to Map. Stephen III died one year later on 4 March 1172. His funeral mass in Esztergom was celebrated by Lucas, according to Arnold of Lübeck's Chronica Slavorum.

=== Ambivalent relationship with Béla III ===
"If you want to listen diligently and carefully consider, how much We have always put [our trust] in you, and how We supported you, to Our great shame, also by breaking the truth, you will understand, not because of Our harshness, but because of the quality of your merits that We are denying the solemn consolation of the Apostolic Blessing from you. Because you can remember enough how much you were impenitent and rebellious towards us [...] how much shame and injustice, how much contempt and insult We were forced to endure from you in the matter of the said Archbishop [Andrew], who [...] was excommunicated and declared oath-breaker by you despite Our ban. [...] You defame at the speck in your brother's eye, but do not consider the planks of arrogance and self-praise in your own eye [Mt. 7,3], you became one of those – as is clear from your frequent actions – of said: Blind guides, who strain out a gnat and swallow a camel [Mt. 23,24]. [...] As We once commanded you and leave it in the virtue of obedience, do not avoid the aforementioned Archbishop anymore, do not preach to others should avoid, furthermore do not dare to claim that he is a member of the Devil, excommunicated or oath-breaker. Be aware of it, if you continue to dare to avoid this Archbishop, We will avoid you, an excommunicated, and We also ordered everyone else to avoid you [...]."

— Pope Alexander III's letter to Archbishop Lucas in March 1179

Following the death of Stephen III, a Hungarian delegation visited Emperor Manuel and Béla in Sardica (now Sophia in Bulgaria) and invited the prince to the Hungarian throne. Béla, who lived in Constantinople since 1163 and was the former designated heir of the Byzantine Empire, arrived in Hungary with his wife Agnes of Antioch in Székesfehérvár in late April or early May. It is uncertain if Archbishop Lucas initially supported Béla's claim (as historian György Györffy and András Kubinyi argued), or if he was against Béla's invitation from the beginning. In a letter written by Pope Alexander III, Béla was unanimously elected king by the "dignitaries of the Hungarian kingdom", including Lucas. However, Béla's coronation was delayed because Lucas refused to perform the ceremony. The Archbishop accused the king of simony because Béla had given a precious cloak (pallium) to his delegate. A theory suggests that Lucas also feared that the influence of "schismatics" would increase under Béla's rule. Nevertheless, the majority of the barons and prelates remained loyal to Béla, who sought the assistance of the Holy See against the archbishop. Pope Alexander III imposed a papal rebuke on Lucas for his inflexibility and ordered him to crown Béla, but the archbishop continued to refuse to crown Béla III. Upon Béla's request, Pope Alexander III temporarily authorized the Archbishop of Kalocsa (presumably Chama) to anoint Béla king and perform his coronation, which took place on 18 January 1173.

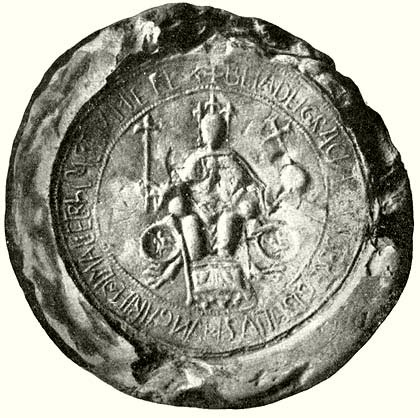
Seal of Béla III of Hungary

Lucas became a member of the internal opposition which rejected Béla's reign. The archbishop allied with his former opponent Queen Euphrosyne and supported the aspirations of the late Géza II's youngest son, Géza, who aimed to continue the anti-Byzantine and pro-papal (at least, since 1169) policies of Stephen III. Around the same time, Lucas lifted Euphrosyne from papal anathema unilaterally, which was imposed on her after she had allegedly confiscated the provostship of Székesfehérvár from its provost, Gregory. To avoid a possible civil war, Béla III imprisoned Géza (who had already contacted Emperor Frederick) soon after his coronation. Archbishop Lucas fell out of favour with Béla and was ignored by him in the first years of his reign. Instead of Lucas, the Archbishop of Kalocsa baptised Béla's first-born son, Emeric, in 1174. Lucas lost his political importance through total neglect after his long-time rival Andrew rose to become Archbishop of Kalocsa in 1176. Andrew, as a skilled diplomat, became the de facto head of the Catholic Church in Hungary and was acknowledged by Pope Alexander III. Lucas did not appear in witness lists of the subsequent royal charters for the next eight years until 1180. However, administering sacraments to members of the royal family had always been the Archbishops of Esztergom's responsibility. By 1176, Béla overthrew Géza's partisans' resistance and put Euphrosyne in confinement. Historian Pál Engel observed Lucas' "anxiety proved to be wholly unjustified", as Béla III governed Hungary as an independent monarch and excluded the neighboring empire's influence beyond its borders throughout his reign.

Lucas' retirement from state affairs resulted in the issuance of written records and the termination of official literacy within the royal chapel. Several educated and skilled members of its staff left the royal court to follow Lucas, which can be traced by the drastic reduction in the number of royal decrees until 1181. The royal chapel never regained its former influence, even after Béla III and Lucas reconciled after 1179. In the imperial court of Constantinople, Béla learnt the importance of a well-organised administration and emphasised the importance of written records. In 1181 he ordered that a charter was to be issued for all transactions proceeding in his presence. This decision resulted in permanently establishing the Royal Chancery and the proliferation of governmental literacy independent from the ecclesiastical institutions. Béla III aimed to separate the issuance of royal charters from the court clergy after his long-lasting jurisdictional conflicts with Lucas.

Béla III's long-time favorite, Andrew, Archbishop of Kalocsa, insulted his royal authority between 1178 and 1179. The king deprived him and his supporter, Gregory, Provost of Székesfehérvár Chapter, of their offices and seized the Archbishop's revenues. Béla also confiscated Székesfehérvár's royal chapel, which belonged to the direct jurisdiction of the Holy See. Andrew fled Hungary and petitioned to the Roman Curia, requesting an investigation at the Third Council of the Lateran. Pope Alexander III threatened Béla III with excommunication and punished him with ecclesiastic sanctions. Béla had reconciled with Archbishop Lucas, who absolved him and excommunicated Andrew of Kalocsa and his clerical partisans. Lucas charged Andrew with the unlawful domination of priests and clergymen of the royal churches, which were traditionally placed under the territorial authority of the Archdiocese of Esztergom. Beside personal conflicts, this case was also a chapter of the long-time rivalry between the Esztergom and Kalocsa sees for the leadership of the Hungarian church. In his harshly-worded letter sent to Hungary in March 1179, Pope Alexander listed Lucas' past "sins" in detail since the rule of Stephen III and threatened to excommunicate him if he maintained the punishment he imposed on Andrew. In another letter, Pope Alexander III urged the Hungarian clergy not to obey Lucas' instructions. Despite the papal efforts Lucas retained his influence at the royal court until his death. Lucas' last mention of being alive was on 20 August 1181. He died shortly thereafter, roughly around the same time as Pope Alexander III's death (30 August 1181). Lucas was succeeded as Archbishop of Esztergom by Nicholas in 1181.

== Legacy and canonization process ==
Györffy noted that Lucas was the first prelate in the continental Europe, who spread the cult of Thomas Becket (later sanctified as Saint Thomas of Canterbury), who was murdered in 1170 and was canonized by Pope Alexander III three years later. Upon Béla's invitation, plausibly under the influence of Lucas, Cistercian monks came from Pontigny Abbey – Becket's former place of exile – and set up a new filial abbey at Egres in 1179. Lucas also founded a provostship at the outskirts of Esztergom, dedicated to Becket (present-day Szenttamás, a borough of Esztergom). Some of Becket's relics were transferred to Esztergom in the 16th century.

Lucas was styled as "saintly" by the records of Henry of Mügeln and Cistercian friar Alberic of Trois-Fontaines. According to Italian historian Odorico Raynaldi, Lucas died as an "eminent moral priest", who cured sick people of their various illnesses, honouring him as a saint. His canonisation was first initiated by Robert, Archbishop of Esztergom in 1231, who had several conflicts with Andrew II of Hungary and the intervening secular authority. This influenced Lucas to promote the political goals of Robert, according to historian Gyula Kristó. Upon his request, Pope Gregory IX entrusted Bulcsú Lád, Bishop of Csanád and two other clergymen on 28 August 1231 to conduct an investigation and send their report to Rome. After receiving the report and the letter in support of Andrew, the pope ordered papal legate Giacomo di Pecorari on 17 February 1233 to deal with the canonisation issue among other matters. However the protocol was lost and the canonisation was postponed. Egyed Hermann and József Félegyházy stated that the initiative failed in silence due to the Mongol invasion of 1241. Other historians argue Lucas was not necessarily a suitable and exemplary person for the Holy See as he has repeatedly represented the interests of his church against even the pope. Andrew's son, Béla IV unsuccessfully attempted to initiate his canonisation. There were some semi official attempts by some prelates afterwards, including Ignác Batthyány, János Scitovszky and József Mindszenty.

== Sources ==
- Bodri, Ferenc (2003). Lukács érsek és kora [Archbishop Lucas and his Times] (in Hungarian). Kossuth Kiadó. ISBN 963-09-4474-X.
- Engel, Pál (2001). The Realm of St Stephen: A History of Medieval Hungary, 895–1526. I.B. Tauris Publishers. ISBN 1-86064-061-3.
- Györffy, György (1970). "Becket Tamás és Magyarország [Thomas Becket and Hungary]". Filológiai Közlöny. 16 (1–2): 153–158. ISSN 0015-1785.
- Körmendi, Tamás (2003). "Lukács [Lucas]". In Beke, Margit (ed.). Esztergomi érsekek 1001–2003 [Archbishops of Esztergom 1001–2003] (in Hungarian). Szent István Társulat. pp. 59–72. ISBN 963-361-472-4.
- Kubinyi, András (1975). "Királyi kancellária és udvari kápolna Magyarországon a XII. század közepén [Royal Chancery and Court Chapel in Hungary in the Middle of the 12th Century]". Levéltári Közlemények (in Hungarian). 46 (1). National Archives of Hungary: 59–121. ISSN 0024-1512.
- Makk, Ferenc (1989). The Árpáds and the Comneni: Political Relations between Hungary and Byzantium in the 12th century (Translated by György Novák). Akadémiai Kiadó. ISBN 963-05-5268-X.
- Makk, Ferenc (1994). "Lukács". In Kristó, Gyula; Engel, Pál; Makk, Ferenc (eds.). Korai magyar történeti lexikon (9–14. század) [Encyclopedia of the Early Hungarian History (9th–14th centuries)] (in Hungarian). Akadémiai Kiadó. pp. 417, 420. ISBN 963-05-6722-9.
- Sugár, István (1984). Az egri püspökök története [The History of the Bishops of Eger] (in Hungarian). Szent István Társulat. ISBN 963-360-392-7.
- Szabados, György (2003). "Lukács esztergomi érsek [Lucas, Archbishop of Esztergom]". In Szentpéteri, József (ed.). Szürke eminenciások a magyar történelemben (in Hungarian). Kossuth Kiadó. pp. 10–13. ISBN 963-09-4499-5.
- Thoroczkay, Gábor, ed. (2018). Írott források az 1116–1205 közötti magyar történelemről [Written Sources of the Hungarian History between 1116 and 1205] (in Hungarian). Szegedi Középkorász Műhely. ISBN 978-615-80398-3-3.
- Török, József (1993). "Lukács érsek, a királyság támasza [Archbishop Lucas, the Mainstay of the Realm]". In Dankó, László (ed.). "Ex invisibilibus visibilia..." Emlékkönyv Dávid Katalin professzor asszony 70. születésnapjára (in Hungarian). Pesti Szalon–Ferenczy. pp. 265–271. ISBN 963-8340-78-9.
- Török, József (2002). "Lukács érsek, a keresztény királyság pillére [Archbishop Lucas, the Pillar of the Christian Kingdom]". Vigilia. 67 (6): 516–520. ISSN 0042-6024.
- Zsoldos, Attila (2011). Magyarország világi archontológiája, 1000–1301 [Secular Archontology of Hungary, 1000–1301] (in Hungarian). História, MTA Történettudományi Intézete. ISBN 978-963-9627-38-3.

Catholic Church titles
Preceded by Martyrius	Bishop of Eger; 1156–1158	Succeeded by Chama
Preceded by Martyrius	Archbishop of Esztergom; 1158–1181	Succeeded by Nicholas
