= Chama (archbishop of Kalocsa) =

Hungarian bishop

- Archbishop of Kalocsa
- Installed: 1166/69
- Term ended: 1171/76
- Predecessor: Mikó
- Successor: Stephen
- Other post: Bishop of Eger

Personal details
- Died: 1171/76
- Denomination: Roman Catholic

Chama, also Sayna or Chemma (Hungarian: Csama or Soma; died between 1171 and 1176), was a Hungarian prelate in the twelfth century. He was successively Bishop of Eger from 1158 to around 1166, then Archbishop of Kalocsa between around 1169 and 1171.

== Early career ==
There are several uncertainties regarding his life and career. He succeeded Lucas in the position of Bishop of Eger. In this capacity, his name first appears chronologically in a document without the exact date. Accordingly, Géza II ordered Ded of Vác and Chama of Eger to rededicate the Szentjobb Abbey (present-day Sâniob in Romania) with the consent of Archbishop Lucas. Consequently, the narration occurred sometime between 1158 (Lucas' ascension to the see of Esztergom) and 1162 (the death of Géza II). The aforementioned document was issued by Géza's son and successor Stephen III of Hungary, who narrated in his charter that the Benedictine monastery of Szentjobb was attacked and plundered by the sons of a certain "Palatine Paul" thereafter. As a result, Archbishop Lucas excommunicated them. The charter was later transcribed by both Béla III of Hungary and Charles I of Hungary and preserved until the 18th century. Its text was published and annotated by Croatian historian Baltazar Adam Krčelić in his work Historiarum cathedralis ecclesiae Zagrabiensis partis primae tomus I, and it is the only surviving text form as the original charter is lost. Historian Tamás Körmendi questioned the validity of the issuance, which suffers from 18th-century misinterpretations, explanations, anachronisms and factual errors made by plausibly Krčelić, thus the authenticity of the original lost royal charter is also uncertain. Chama was also mentioned as Bishop of Eger by two unquestionably authentic contemporary documents, issued in 1165 and October 1166 (he was called Chemma in the latter royal charter).

== Archbishop ==
Sometime between 1166 and 1169, Chama was transferred to the archiepiscopal see of Kalocsa, succeeding Mikó, who last appeared in this capacity in 1165. Following the end of the Byzantine intervention, which characterized the first years of Stephen III's reign, a Hungarian army invaded Dalmatia and Syrmia around early 1167 in order to recapture those lands from Emperor Manuel. Chama was among those prelates, who escorted Stephen III in his military campaign to Dalmatia. He acted as a witness, when the Hungarian monarch confirmed the privileges of Šibenik in 1169 (or still 1167), proving that the town accepted Hungarian suzerainty after the invasion. He again functioned in this capacity in that year (according to others, it occurred in 1171), when Stephen III concluded a concordat with the Holy See, renouncing the control of the appointment of the prelates. The document preserved only the first letter of his name "C." or "Ch."; 17th-century French scholar Felix Contelorus unlocked the abbreviation with "Cosmas" in his work "Acta concordiae Alexandri III. Pontificis cum Frederico imperatore" (1632). This solution was often adopted by many scholarly works in the next centuries, but such an archbishop of Kalocsa with this name never existed, and notable historians, including Gyula Pauler, Imre Szentpétery and Gyula Városy identified this person with Chama.

Chama was last mentioned as Archbishop of Kalocsa in 1171. Stephen III died on 4 March 1172. Thereafter, his younger brother Béla returned to Hungary from Constantinople. He was unanimously elected king by the barons of the realm, but the coronation was delayed, because Archbishop Lucas, refused to perform the coronation. Lucas feared that the influence of "schismatics" would increase under Béla's rule. Béla III sought the assistance of the Holy See against Archbishop Lucas. Upon his request, Pope Alexander III authorized the Archbishop of Kalocsa to anoint Béla king and "place the crown on his head". It is possible that this unidentified prelate, who performed the coronation on 18 January 1173, is identical with Chama, if he was still alive. The next known office-holder was Stephen in 1176, a strong opponent of Béla III's rule, thus his involvement is less likely.

== Sources ==
- Körmendi, Tamás (2003). "Lukács [Lucas]". In Beke, Margit (ed.). Esztergomi érsekek 1001–2003 [Archbishops of Esztergom 1001–2003] (in Hungarian). Szent István Társulat. pp. 59–72. ISBN 963-361-472-4.
- Sugár, István (1984). Az egri püspökök története [The History of the Bishops of Eger] (in Hungarian). Szent István Társulat. ISBN 963-360-392-7.
- Udvardy, József (1991). A kalocsai érsekek életrajza (1000–1526) [Biographies of Archbishops of Kalocsa, 1000–1526] (in Hungarian). Görres Gesellschaft.
- Zsoldos, Attila (2011). Magyarország világi archontológiája, 1000–1301 [Secular Archontology of Hungary, 1000–1301] (in Hungarian). História, MTA Történettudományi Intézete. ISBN 978-963-9627-38-3.

Catholic Church titles
Preceded by Lucas	Bishop of Eger; 1158–1166	Succeeded by Peter (?)
Preceded by Mikó	Archbishop of Kalocsa c. 1169–1171	Succeeded by Stephen
