= Géza, son of Géza II of Hungary =

Hungarian prince (c. 1151–after 1191)

Géza
- Born: c. 1151
- Died: after 1191
- Spouse: A Byzantine woman
- Issue: sons, including Alexios
- House: Árpád dynasty
- Father: Géza II of Hungary
- Mother: Euphrosyne of Kiev

Géza (c. 1151 – after 1191) was the youngest son of King Géza II of Hungary. He was the younger brother of Stephen III and Béla III of Hungary. Géza was a pretender to the Hungarian throne against Béla III, but he was imprisoned from 1177 to 1189. He traveled to the Holy Land during the Third Crusade with an army of 2,000 Hungarian warriors.

== Background ==
Géza was born in the early 1150s, the third son of King Géza II of Hungary and his wife, Euphrosyne of Kiev. In near-contemporary German chronicles – for instance, Alberic of Trois-Fontaines – he was also referred to as "Guithardus" or "Gotthard". After his father King Géza II died in 1162, there were several conflicts over the royal succession. Géza's eldest brother was crowned Stephen III of Hungary, but two of their father's brothers briefly seized the throne, reigning as Ladislaus II and Stephen IV of Hungary. Stephen III defeated his uncle in battle in 1163, regaining control over the whole kingdom.

During the reign of Stephen III, the wars against the Byzantine Empire continued. Byzantine emperor Manuel I Komnenos had previously competed with Géza II on many occasions, as he was determined to expand his influence over Hungary. Manuel I's mother was Saint Piroska of Hungary, daughter of Saint Ladislaus I of Hungary, and he always had a great interest in the internal affairs of Hungary. Manuel I and Stephen III eventually resolved this through a peace accord signed in 1163, in which the Hungarian king's younger brother Béla was to be sent to Constantinople in surety. During Stephen III's rule, he kept his mother, Euphrosyne, and his youngest brother, Géza, at court.

== Pretender ==
After Stephen III's death in March 1172, Géza's next eldest brother, Béla, was recalled from Constantinople to ascend the throne and forestall any attempt at accession by his younger brother, Géza.

Within a few months, the arriving prince was crowned Béla III of Hungary on 13 January 1173 but faced opposition from his own mother, the Queen Dowager, and his brother, Géza, who began conspiring against him to obtain the Crown of Hungary. Lucas, Archbishop of Esztergom, who refused to perform the coronation, delaying the ceremony for almost a year, also supported the aspirations of Géza, who aimed to continue the anti-Byzantine and pro-papal policies of Stephen III. Despite that Béla's claim – besides the Byzantine Empire – was supported by Pope Alexander III, too, and it is plausible that Géza and his domestic supporters sought assistance from the rival Holy Roman Empire at the turn of 1172 and 1173, but Frederick I, Holy Roman Emperor was fully engaged with his Italian and Polish campaigns during that time. After a couple of failed attempts, Béla III had them arrested in 1174. He imprisoned his mother, too, but Géza and his several partisans – including Lawrence and possibly Stephen, Archbishop of Kalocsa – escaped from captivity and fled to the court of Henry II, Duke of Austria in 1174 or 1175 to seek protection. When Henry refused to extradite Géza, Béla launched plundering raids into Austria, together with Soběslav II, Duke of Bohemia. A year later, Géza tried to persuade Soběslav II of Bohemia to help him meet Frederick I, Holy Roman emperor, but Soběslav seized Géza and handed him over to Béla in 1177.

Béla once again imprisoned his brother, and he also put their mother, Euphrosyne, in confinement, while a certain ispán Vata was blinded. Géza languished in prison from 1177 to 1189. Euphrosyne was set free in 1186, but she was obliged to leave the kingdom for Constantinople, while Géza remained in captivity. Freedom arrived for him in 1189 due to preparations for the Third Crusade. That year, Frederick Barbarossa, arrived in Hungary and was received by King Béla III. Learning of Géza's predicament via Béla's second spouse, Margaret of France, the Holy Roman emperor asked Béla III to allow the imprisoned Géza to lead a small Hungarian army to the Crusade as an escort, according to Arnold of Lübeck. Béla III allowed this, and 2,000 Hungarian soldiers left for the Holy Land under the leadership of Géza and Bishop Ugrin Csák.

== Later life ==
Shortly after, Béla III ordered the Hungarian contingent to return from Niš to Hungary, because he did not want to confront with his son-in-law, Emperor Isaac II Angelos, who embroiled conflict with the Holy Roman Emperor during the early phase of the Third Crusade. While the majority of the army led by Ugrin Csák, including six ispáns returned to Hungary, Géza and his small escort, including three ispáns (barons) remained in the crusader army, and participated in the subsequent battles and sieges. Géza settled down in the Byzantine Empire after the death of Emperor Frederick. It is known that Géza took a Byzantine noblewoman (possibly from the ruling Angelos dynasty) as wife between 1190 and 1191. According to a Greek codex kept in the Saint Catherine's Monastery, translated by historian Szabolcs de Vajay, Géza adopted the name Ioannes (John) in the Byzantine Empire. Géza was the uncle of Empress Margaret, the consort of Emperor Isaac II Angelos. It is possible that Géza integrated into the Byzantine elite through her assistance and financial support.

His sons – one of them, Géza–Alexios is known by name – first appeared in contemporary sources in 1210, it is plausible that Géza had died by then. In that year, a group of discontented Hungarian lords during the conspiracy (1209–10) offered the crown to them against their cousin, the ruling monarch Andrew II of Hungary; they lived in "Greek land". However, their envoys were captured by Domald of Sidraga in Split in 1210. Years later, when Andrew II decided to return to Hungary from the Fifth Crusade in early 1218, the troops of Géza's sons attacked his army when he stayed in Nicaea (now İznik, Turkey).

== Sources ==
- Bácsatyai, Dániel (2017). "A 13. századi francia–magyar kapcsolatok néhány kérdése [France and Hungary in the 13th Century: Contacts, Questions and Observations]" (PDF). Századok (in Hungarian). 151 (2). Magyar Történelmi Társulat: 237–278. ISSN 0039-8098.
- Engel, Pál (2001). The Realm of St Stephen: A History of Medieval Hungary, 895–1526. I.B. Tauris Publishers. ISBN 1-86064-061-3.
- Kristó, Gyula; Makk, Ferenc (1996). Az Árpád-ház uralkodói [Rulers of the House of Árpád] (in Hungarian). I.P.C. Könyvek. ISBN 963-7930-97-3.
- Makk, Ferenc (1989). The Árpáds and the Comneni: Political Relations between Hungary and Byzantium in the 12th century (Translated by György Novák). Akadémiai Kiadó. ISBN 963-05-5268-X.
- Terplán, Zoltán (2012). A keresztes hadjáratok és az Árpád-kori Magyar Királyság [The Crusades and the Kingdom of Hungary during the Age of Árpáds] (in Hungarian). Hun-Idea Szellemi Hagyományőrző Műhely. ISBN 978-963-7014-61-1.
- Wertner, Mór (1892). Az Árpádok családi története [Family History of the Árpáds] (in Hungarian). Szabó Ferencz N.-eleméri plébános & Pleitz Fer. Pál Könyvnyomdája.
