= Mikó (archbishop of Kalocsa) =

Hungarian Archbishop

- Archbishop of Kalocsa
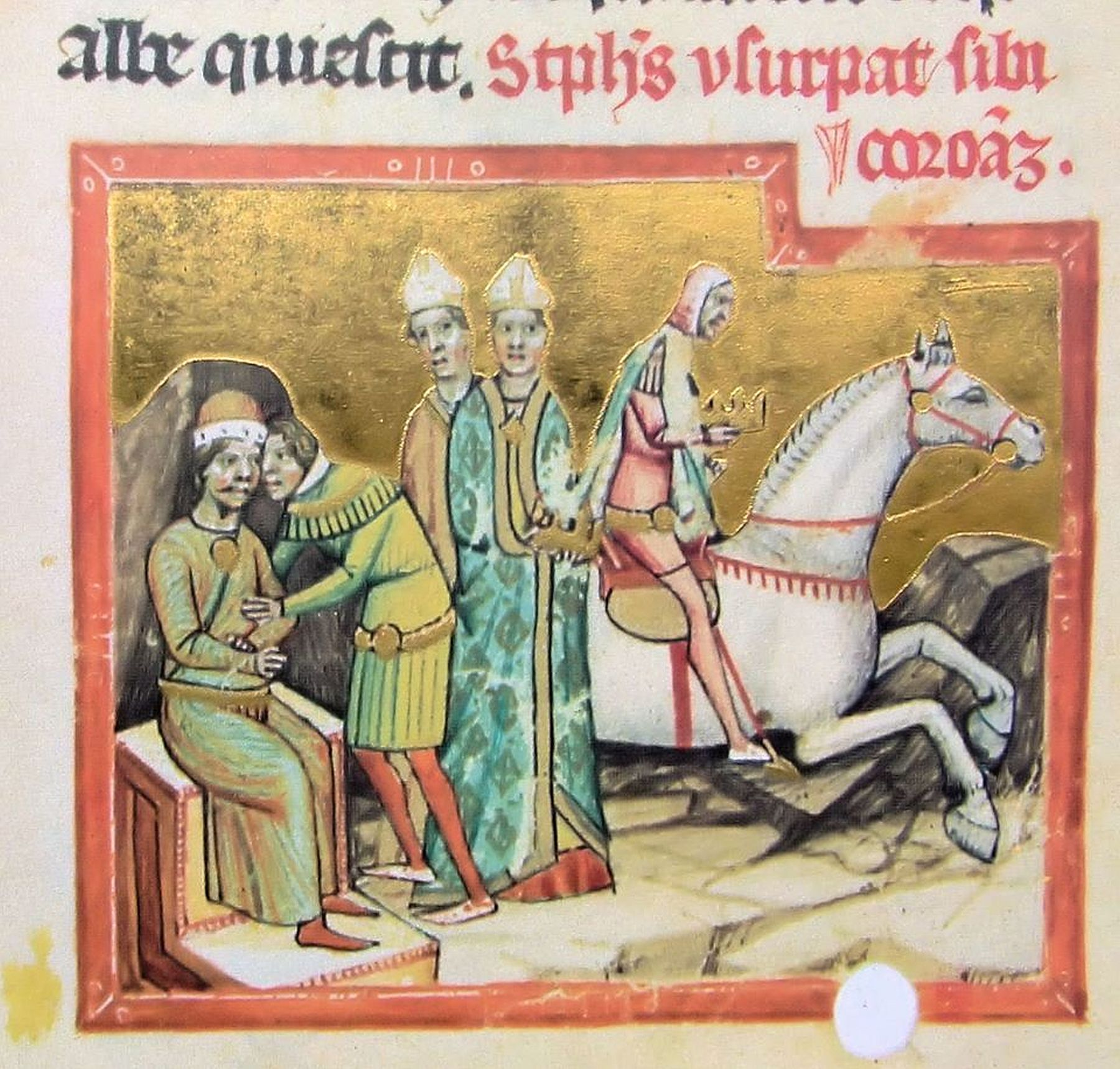
- Ladislaus II is crowned king by Mikó (from the Illuminated Chronicle)
- Installed: 1156
- Term ended: 1165
- Predecessor: Simon (?)
- Successor: Chama
- Other post: Provost of Buda

Personal details
- Died: 1165/69
- Denomination: Roman Catholic

Mikó (died between 1165 and 1169) was a Hungarian prelate in the twelfth century. He was Archbishop of Kalocsa between around 1156 and 1165. He crowned two Hungarian monarchs, Ladislaus II and Stephen IV king, because Lucas, Archbishop of Esztergom, who considered them as usurpers, had denied to perform the ceremony.

== Early career ==
Mikó is first mentioned by a contemporary record in 1148, when he already served as provost of the collegiate chapter of Buda. In that year, King Géza II expanded the sources of revenues for the chapter by granting significant and lucrative surrounding customs and port duties – for instance, Gézavására ("Géza's fair"), the ports of Pest and Kerepes, the fishing rights on the Danube from the port of Megyer to the royal land of Csepel Island – in the territory of present-day Budapest.

== Archbishop of Kalocsa ==
Mikó elevated into the archbishopric of Kalocsa by 1156, when he first appeared in this capacity. His last known predecessor, Simon held the dignity more than two decades earlier, according to the surviving documents and charters. In that year, he appeared as a witness, when Archbishop Martyrius of Esztergom provided the tithe of 70 villages in the surrounding counties to the cathedral chapter of Esztergom. Mikó was accompanied by Peter, provost of Titel (now in Serbia) during the act. He featured a similar function in the next year, March 1157, when Gervasius, Bishop of Győr interceded with Géza II to grant the collection right of salt duties to the archdiocese of Esztergom at Nána and Kakat (present-day Štúrovo, Slovakia). A non-authentic charter from 1158, which all the same may have preserved the memory of real events, refers to a court case proceeding between Antimius, Bishop of Pécs and the abbot of Pécsvárad, judged by the two archbishops, including Mikó, and their suffragan bishops. According to another non-authentic charter, Mikó hosted Géza II and several other prelates in his archiepiscopal see, Bács (present-day Bač, Serbia) on Easter 1158. The forgery claims that Géza, amidst the feast, transliterated Saint Stephen's privilege donations to the Pécsvárad Abbey (as the original document have been destroyed during a fire in 1105).

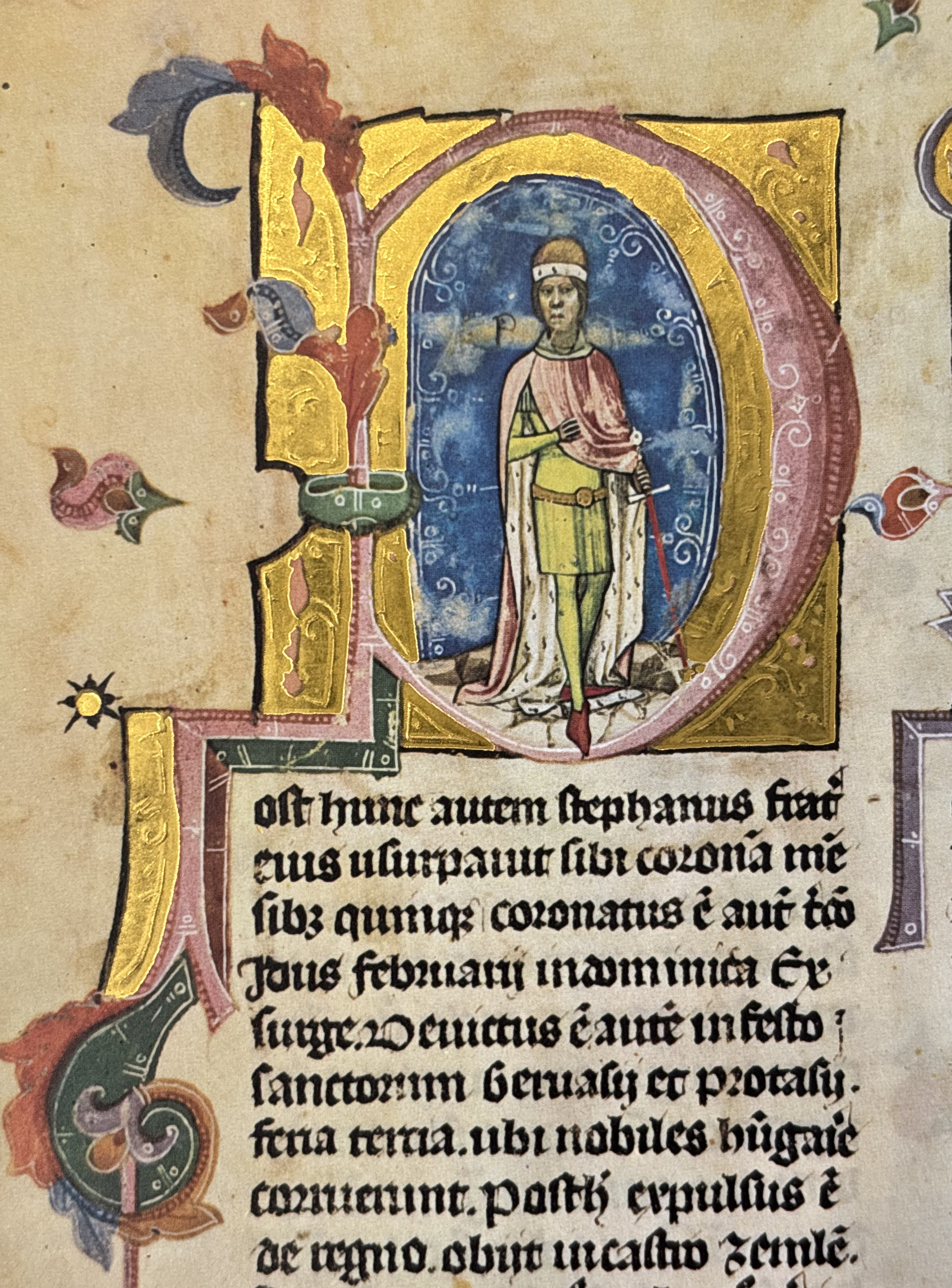
Stephen IV depicted in the Illuminated Chronicle

Géza II died on 31 May 1162. His 15-year-old son, Stephen III was crowned by Archbishop Lucas within days. Initially, Mikó belonged to the partisans of the new monarch and resided in his royal court. On hearing of Géza's death, Byzantine Emperor Manuel I Komnenos dispatched an army and hastened towards Hungary, because he attempted to extend his suzerainty over the kingdom. As a result, he supported the claim of the Hungarian king's namesake uncle, Duke Stephen, who had spent the previous years in exile at Constantinople. Fearful of an invasion by the Byzantines, the Hungarian magnates agreed to accept Géza's another brother, Duke Ladislaus as a "compromise candidate". After his defeat at Kapuvár, Stephen III fled from Hungary and sought refuge in Austria. Archbishop Lucas was one of the few who remained loyal to the young monarch, refusing to crown his uncle. Therefore, the coronation ceremony of Ladislaus II was performed by Mikó in July 1262, despite that the coronation of the Hungarian monarch was part of the privilege of the dignity Archbishop of Esztergom (as Walter Map's De nugis curialium noted, Mikó "had no authority for such a coronation"). Historian Ferenc Makk considered that the rivalry between the metropolitan sees of Esztergom and Kalocsa, beside the latter's territorial proximity to the Byzantine frontier, also contributed to Mikó's defection to the court of Ladislaus II. Shortly thereafter, Lucas was imprisoned, thus Mikó became de facto head of the Roman Catholic Church in Hungary. During the succession disputes, the two archbishops of Hungary, Lucas and Mikó never failed to take opposition sides in the factional fights.

Ladislaus II died within six months, on 14 January 1163. His younger brother, Stephen IV succeeded him. Archbishop Mikó once again performed his coronation ceremony on 27 January, because Lucas of Esztergom refused to crown him. Stephen's only preserved charter from the same year mentions Mikó as a faithful member of his royal court. His suffragans – for instance, Nicholas of Várad – also swore loyalty to the anti-king. Stephen IV remained unpopular among the Hungarian lords, enabling his nephew to muster an army. In the decisive battle, which was fought at Székesfehérvár on 19 June 1163, the younger Stephen routed his uncle, forcing him once again to flee Hungary. Shortly thereafter, Archbishop Mikó reconciled with Stephen III and swore fealty to the returning monarch, who applied no sanctions against Mikó. In response, Emperor Manuel invaded Hungary with his army, which also advanced into the prelate's see, Bács during one of the military operations. According to historian Gyula Pauler, Stephen III sent Archbishop Mikó, alongside others, to the Byzantine court to negotiate the peace with Emperor Manuel in 1165. Mikó is last mentioned as a living person in that year. It is plausible that he died before 1169, when his successor Chama was first referred to as Archbishop of Kalocsa.

== Sources ==
- Makk, Ferenc (1989). The Árpáds and the Comneni: Political Relations between Hungary and Byzantium in the 12th century (Translated by György Novák). Akadémiai Kiadó. ISBN 963-05-5268-X.
- Makk, Ferenc (1994). "Mikó". In Kristó, Gyula; Engel, Pál; Makk, Ferenc (eds.). Korai magyar történeti lexikon (9–14. század) [Encyclopedia of the Early Hungarian History (9th–14th centuries)] (in Hungarian). Akadémiai Kiadó. p. 457. ISBN 963-05-6722-9.
- Udvardy, József (1991). A kalocsai érsekek életrajza (1000–1526) [Biographies of Archbishops of Kalocsa, 1000–1526] (in Hungarian). Görres Gesellschaft.
- Zsoldos, Attila (2011). Magyarország világi archontológiája, 1000–1301 [Secular Archontology of Hungary, 1000–1301] (in Hungarian). História, MTA Történettudományi Intézete. ISBN 978-963-9627-38-3.

Catholic Church titles
Preceded by Simon (?)	Archbishop of Kalocsa; 1156–1165	Succeeded by Chama
