= Liubava Dmitrievna Zavidich =

Grand Princess of Kiev from c. 1122 to 1132

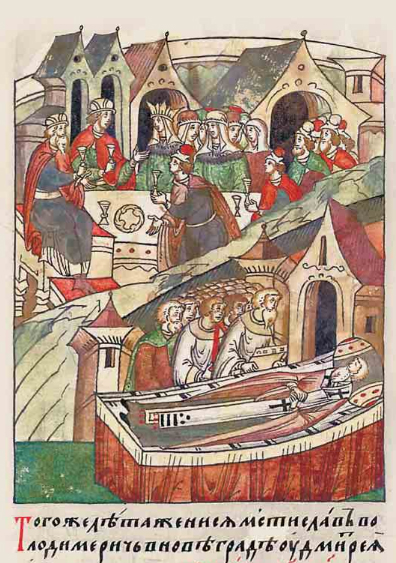
- Born: c. 1120
- Died: 1169
- Spouse: Mstislav I of Kiev
- Issue: Vladimir III Mstislavich; Euphrosyne of Kiev

Liubava Dmitrievna Zavidich (Ukrainian: Любава Дмитріївна) (1120 – 1169), was a Grand Princess of the Kiev by marriage to Mstislav I of Kiev, Grand Prince of Kiev (r. 1125–1132). She is mainly known for her political activities in favour of her son during her widowhood.

She was the daughter of Dmitry Zavidich, a nobleman of Novgorod.

She married Mstislav I of Kiev after the death of his first spouse in 1122. Their children were:

1. Vladimir III Mstislavich (1132 – 1171)
2. Euphrosyne of Kiev, (c. 1130 – c. 1193) married King Géza II of Hungary in 1146.
