= Andrew (archbishop of Kalocsa) =

Hungarian prelate

- Archbishop of Kalocsa
- Archdiocese: Kalocsa
- Installed: 1176
- Term ended: 1186
- Predecessor: Stephen
- Successor: Paul
- Other post: Bishop of Győr

Personal details
- Died: 1186 Rome, Papal States
- Denomination: Catholic

Andrew (Hungarian: András; died 1186) was a prelate in the Kingdom of Hungary in the second half of the 12th century. He was Archbishop of Kalocsa between 1176 and 1186, and Bishop of Győr from 1169 to 1176.

== Early career ==
Andrew was a highly educated clergyman and a skilled diplomat, who became a protégé of Pope Alexander III. In his letter issued in 1179, the pope described Andrew as "scientific, religious and virtuous".

He was elected as Bishop of Győr by the cathedral chapter in 1169, as a candidate of King Stephen III of Hungary. His last known predecessor was Gervasius, who was last mentioned in that capacity in 1158. However, despite the demand of both Pope Alexander and Stephen III, Lucas, Archbishop of Esztergom attempted to hinder the consecration of Andrew, because of his allegedly non-canonical election. Although Cardinal Manfred, who acted as papal legate to Hungary in that year, admonished Lucas to celebrate Andrew's consecration, he still refused to do so. This event laid the foundations for a long-standing rivalry between Lucas and Andrew.

== Archbishop of Kalocsa ==
=== Head of the Catholic Church in Hungary ===
"It is really depressing us [...] that Our reverend brother, the Archbishop of Kalocsa [Andrew], whom We consider to be extremely kind and welcome for his science, religiosity and virtue, seems to have fallen so out of your grace due to the promptings of his enemies that not only him, but his [subordinates] also suffer undeserved humiliations, and this Archbishop was deprived from [...] his office to the great grievance of the Roman Church and the diminution of the prestige of Your [Béla's] name. In fact, this Archbishop, appearing before Our presence, as far as he could, assuring, stated strongly and firmly that he did not violate Your Royal Majesty and Your dignity in nothing at all, and if he may have offended You verbally after all as You previously complained to Us, which he completely denies, he deserves forgiveness due to the triviality of his insult, as You know: as the tongue is in a wet place, [thus] it is impossible not to slip sometimes and blissful is that person who does not verbally offend [anyone]. [...]"

— Pope Alexander III's letter to Béla III of Hungary in March 1179

Following the death of Stephen III, his younger brother Béla returned to Hungary from Constantinople and was unanimously proclaimed King of Hungary. However, his coronation was delayed, because Archbishop Lucas refused to perform his ceremony; he feared that the influence of "schismatics" would increase under Béla's rule (his resistance, however, even refused by Pope Alexander). Archbishop Lucas fell out of favor with Béla, and was ignored by him in the first years of his reign. Andrew elevated into the dignity of Archbishop of Kalocsa in 1176, replacing Stephen, who also opposed Béla's rule. Because of Lucas' forced exile from state affairs, Andrew, also a skilled diplomat, became de facto head of the Catholic Church in Hungary, his status was also acknowledged by Pope Alexander III.

After Holy Roman Emperor Frederick Barbarossa deprived Adalbert from his dignity of Archbishop of Salzburg because of his pro-papal affiliation, Pope Alexander sent his papal legate Walter, Bishop of Albano to resolve the conflict. The pope sought assistance from Béla III to mediate the issue. During the summer of 1176, the newly elected Archbishop Andrew led a Hungarian ecclesiastical delegation to Győr, also including Mikod, Bishop-elect of Győr, Andrew's strong ally Gregory, the Provost of Székesfehérvár Chapter and Raynald, Abbot of Pannonhalma. They had met the papal legate there, who summoned both Adalbert and Frederick's candidate Henry, Provost of Berchtesgaden. Only Adalbert appeared before the court at Győr in early August 1176, which ruled in his favor and deprived Henry from his office of Archbishop of Salzburg. According to Walter, Andrew and his companions assisted his judicial activity with advices.

However, his relationship with Béla III had dramatically deteriorated at the turn of 1178 and 1179. According to the monarch, Andrew "insulted his royal authority", as a result Béla soon deprived the Archbishop and his supporter, Gregory, the Provost of Székesfehérvár Chapter, of their office and seized the revenues of the archbishopric. Around the same time, the king reconciled with Archbishop Lucas, who regained his influence at the royal court after a seven-year absence. Andrew fled Hungary and petitioned to the Roman Curia, requesting an investigation at the Third Council of the Lateran in March 1179. Pope Alexander III threatened Béla III with excommunication and punished him with ecclesiastic sanctions, but Lucas absolved him and excommunicated Andrew of Kalocsa and his clerical partisans. Lucas charged Andrew with unlawful domination of priests and clergymen of the royal churches, which were traditionally placed under the territorial authority of the Archdiocese of Esztergom. Beside personal conflicts, this case was also a chapter of the long-time rivalry between the sees Esztergom and Kalocsa for the leadership of the Hungarian church organization. In the previous years, Andrew intended to extend his own authority as bishop and metropolitan at Lucas' expense, usurping the privileges of the Archdiocese of Esztergom. In his letter of harsh tone sent to Hungary in March 1179, Pope Alexander, threatened to excommunicate Lucas if he maintains the punishment he has imposed on Andrew. In another letter, Pope Alexander also urged the Hungary clergy not to obey to Lucas' instructions. In the same time, the pope also sent letter to Béla III, in which he asked the king to take back Andrew into his graces. The conflict ended with a compromise mediated by the Holy See: Archbishop Andrew asked the monarch's pardon and the King restored him. Despite that, Andrew never regained his former influence at the royal court.

=== Later years ===
Andrew was styled as "Archbishop of Bács" by the documents of the Third Council of the Lateran, after the second archiepiscopal see of the Archdiocese of Kalocsa (present-day Bač, Serbia). Consequently, Andrew held his permanent seat there. After the fall of his influence in the royal court of Hungary, Andrew spent almost all time of his remaining tenure in Rome, and dealt with only ecclesiastical affairs. Despite the resolutions of the council, celibacy was not universal among the prelates in Hungary. Archbishop Andrew asked for guidance to the Holy See, what to do if a married man applies to be a priest. Pope Alexander answered in a letter in 1180 that a married man can be ordained a priest if he divorces with the consent of his wife and makes a vow of purity before ordination. Andrew also dealt with the insubordination polemics belonging the Benedictine friars of the Kő monastery, established by Ban Beloš decades earlier, in Syrmia (which laid under the ecclesiastical authority of Kalocsa). Andrew confiscated the abbey from the Benedictines and handed it over to the monks of Abraham of the Valley of Hebron.

According to account from 1185, Andrew had revenue of 2500 silver marks in that year. He died in the next year, in 1186, residing in Rome. He was succeeded by Paul as Archbishop of Kalocsa around 1188.

== Sources ==
- Bánk, József, ed. (1968). Győregyházmegyei almanach. Schematizmus Dioecesis Jaurinensis [Almanac of the Diocese of Győr] (in Hungarian). Authority of the Diocese of Győr.
- Diós, István (1993). Magyar katolikus lexikon [Hungarian Catholic Lexicon] Vol. I (in Hungarian). Szent István Kiadó.
- Kristó, Gyula; Makk, Ferenc (1996). Az Árpád-ház uralkodói [Rulers of the House of Árpád] (in Hungarian). I.P.C. Könyvek. ISBN 963-7930-97-3.
- Makk, Ferenc (1989). The Árpáds and the Comneni: Political Relations between Hungary and Byzantium in the 12th century (Translated by György Novák). Akadémiai Kiadó. ISBN 963-05-5268-X.
- Thoroczkay, Gábor, ed. (2018). Írott források az 1116–1205 közötti magyar történelemről [Written Sources of the Hungarian History between 1116 and 1205] (in Hungarian). Szegedi Középkorász Műhely. ISBN 978-615-80398-3-3.
- Udvardy, József (1991). A kalocsai érsekek életrajza (1000–1526) [Biographies of Archbishops of Kalocsa, 1000–1526] (in Hungarian). Görres Gesellschaft.
- Zsoldos, Attila (2011). Magyarország világi archontológiája, 1000–1301 [Secular Archontology of Hungary, 1000–1301] (in Hungarian). História, MTA Történettudományi Intézete. ISBN 978-963-9627-38-3.

Catholic Church titles
Preceded by Gervasius	Bishop of Győr; 1169–1176	Succeeded by Mikod
Preceded by Stephen	Archbishop of Kalocsa; 1176–1186	Succeeded by Paul
