= Archdiocese of Kalocsa–Kecskemét =

Roman Catholic archdiocese in Hungary

Coordinates: 46.5333°N 18.9856°E

Metropolitan Archdiocese of Kalocsa–Kecskemét Archidioecesis Metropolitae Colocensis–Kecskemetensis Kalocsa–Kecskeméti fővárosi főegyházmegye

Catholic
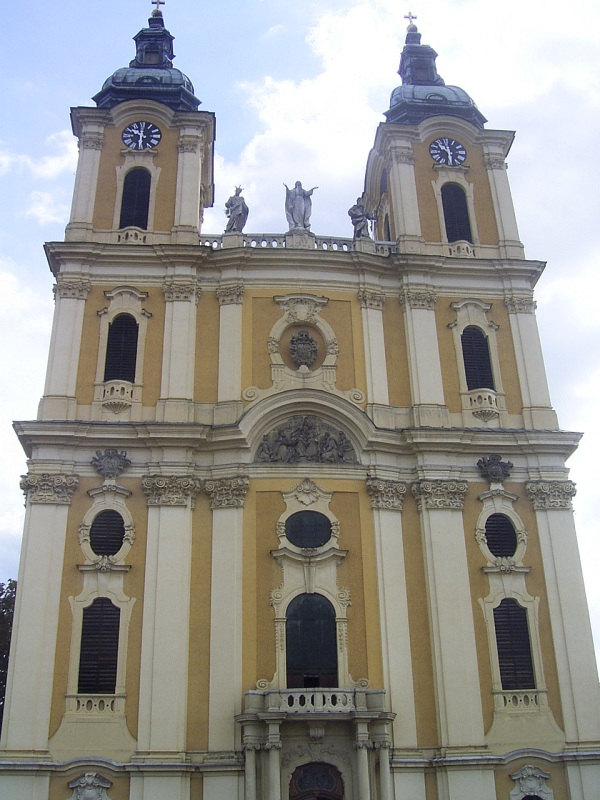
- Cathedral in Kalocsa

Location
- Country: Hungary
- Ecclesiastical province: Kalocsa-Kecskemét

Statistics
- Area: 8,372 km^{2} (3,232 sq mi)
- Population: Total; Catholics: (as of 2014); 536,409; 368,755 (68.7%)
- Parishes: 127

Information
- Denomination: Catholic
- Rite: Latin
- Cathedral: Cathedral of the Assumption in Kalocsa
- Co-cathedral: Co-Cathedral of the Ascension of Our Lord in Kecskemét
- Patron saint: St Paul

Current leadership
- Pope: Leo XIV
- Metropolitan Archbishop: Mons. Ferenc Palánki
- Suffragans: Diocese of Pécs; Diocese of Szeged–Csanád
- Vicar General: Finta József
- Episcopal Vicars: Polyák Imre
- Bishops emeritus: Balázs Bábel

Map

Website
- Website of the Diocese

The Metropolitan Archdiocese of Kalocsa–Kecskemét (Hungarian: Kalocsa–Kecskeméti Fővárosi Főegyházmegye, Latin: Archidioecesis Metropolitae Colocensis–Kecskemetensis) is a Latin Church archdiocese of the Catholic Church in Hungary. The diocese is the metropolitan of the Diocese of Pécs and the Diocese of Szeged–Csanád. Its patron saint is Saint Paul. The current metropolitan archbishop is Mons. Ferenc Palánki, who was appointed in 2026.

== History ==
=== Establishment ===
In his monography about the early history of the Archbishopric of Kalocsa, the Hungarian historian László Koszta concludes that the "establishment of the Diocese of Kalocsa is one of the most debated issues of our ecclesiastic history in the Age of the Árpáds". Indeed, several important details of the early history of the episcopal see are uncertain. The date of its establishment is unknown; its early status—a bishopric, a metropolitan archdiocese or an archbishopric without suffragan bishops—is obscure; its first (arch)bishop is uncertain; and its connection with the see of Bács (now Bač, Serbia) is debated.

According to Hartvik, an early-12th-century biographer of the first king of Hungary, Stephen I, the king "divided his territories into ten bishoprics", making the archbishopric of Esztergom "the metropolitan and master of the others", and bestowed "the dignity of the bishop of Kalocsa" on Abbot Astrik. Astrik, continued Hartvik, was appointed to the see of Esztergom to substitute Archbishop Sebastian who had gone blind, but Asterik "returned to Kalocsa with the pallium" (the archbishops' specific vestment) when Sebastian received back his sight three years later. Stephen's earlier hagiography, the longer version of the Life of Saint Stephen, King of Hungary, did not mention this episode and exclusively referred to Astrik as archbishop of Esztergom. The cathedral church at Kalocsa was dedicated to Paul the Apostle who was renowned especially for his missionary activities. The patron saint implies that the see was established as a missionary bishopric, possibly aimed at the conversion of the so-called Black Hungarians (as it is proposed by historian Gábor Thoroczkay).

Most historians developed their views about the establishment of the see on Hartvic's report. They accept that the see of Kalocsa was set up as a bishopric shortly after Stephen I's coronation in the first decade of the 11th century. According to a scholarly hypothesis, not only the lands between the rivers Danube and Tisza, but also the southern region of Transdanubia (the future Diocese of Pécs), and the Banat (which later developed into the Diocese of Csanád) were included in the new bishopric.

One George was the first archbishop mentioned in a contemporaneous source: in 1050 or 1051 he was one of the prelates who assisted Pope Leo IX to celebrate a mass in Lotharingia.

The Archdiocese of Kalocsa was probably originally set up as a Bishopric by King Stephen I of Hungary, but it became the second Archbishopric in 1009. Its original suffragans were the bishops of Bihar (Romanian: Biharea) and Transylvania. Around 1028 the bishop of the newly established Diocese of Csanád also became a suffragan to the Archdiocese of Kalocsa.

== Secular offices connected to the archbishopric ==
The archbishops of Kalocsa were, from the 15th century to 1776, the perpetual counts (Hungarian: Bács vármegye örökös főispánja, Latin: Bacsiensis perpetuus supremus comes).

== Ordinaries ==
- Astrik (c. 1009)
- George (c. 1050)
- Desiderius (b. 1064–1076/90)
- Paul I (c. 1111–1113)
- Fancica (1131 – c. 1134)
- Simon (c. 1135?)
- Mikó (c. 1156 – c. 1165)
- Chama (c. 1169 – c. 1171)
- Stephen I (?–1176)
- Andrew (1176–1186)
- Paul II (c. 1188–1190)
- Peter (1190–1192)
- Saul Győr (1192–1202)
- John (1202–1205)
- Berthold † (1206 Appointed – 1218 Patriarch of Aquileia)
- Ugrin Csák † (1219 Appointed – 11 April 1241 Died)
- Benedict (1241–1254)
- Thomas Hahót (1254–1256)
- Smaragd (1257–1265)
- Stephen Báncsa (1266–1278)
- John Hont-Pázmány (1278–1301)
- Vincent (1306–1311)
- Demetrius Vicsadoli (1311–1317, elected)
- Ladislaus Jánki (1317–1336/7)
- Nicholas Vásári (1349–1350, elected)
- Nicholas Apáti (1356–1358)
- Thomas Telegdi (1358–1367)
- Juraj Drašković † (1574 Appointed – 31 January 1587 Died)
- Márton Pethe (died 1607)
- István Szuhay † ( 1607 Appointed – 9 Jun 1608 Died)
- János Telegdy † ( 1624 Appointed – 1647 Died)
- János Gubasóczy † ( 1685 Appointed – 10 Apr 1686 Died)
- Leopold Karl, Graf von Kollonitsch † (6 Mar 1690 Appointed – 22 Aug 1695 Appointed, Archbishop of Esztergom)
- Imre Csáky (1710 Appointed – 1732)
- Herman Gabrijel Patačić
- József Batthyány † (15 Dec 1760 Appointed – 20 May 1776 Appointed, Archbishop of Esztergom)
- baron Adam Patačić
- László Kollonitz (László Kollonitz)
- Peter Klobusiczky † (19 Apr 1822 Appointed – 2 Jul 1843 Died)
- József Kunszt † (15 Mar 1852 Appointed – 15 Jan 1866 Died)
- Lajos Haynald † (17 May 1867 Appointed – 4 Jul 1891 Died)
- Juraj Császka † (27 Oct 1891 Appointed – 11 Aug 1904 Died)
- János Csernoch † (20 Apr 1911 Appointed – 13 Dec 1912 Appointed, Archbishop of Esztergom)
- Árpád Lipót Várady † (25 May 1914 Appointed – 1923 Died)
- Gyula Zichy † (31 Aug 1925 Appointed – 1942 Died)
- Gyula Glattfelder † ( 1942 Appointed – 1943 Died)
- József Grósz † (7 May 1943 Appointed – 3 Oct 1961 Died)
- Endre Hamvas † (15 Sep 1964 Appointed – 1969 Retired)
- József Ijjas † (10 Jan 1969 Appointed – 5 Jun 1987 Retired)
- László Dankó † (5 Jun 1987 Appointed – 25 Jun 1999 Died)
- Balázs Bábel (25 Jun 1999 – 3 Sept 2026)
- Ferenc Palánki (3 Sept 2026 - ...)

== Sources ==
- Baán, István (1997). "The Foundation of the Archbishopric of Kalocsa: The Byzantine Origin of the Second Archdiocese in Hungary". Early Christianity in Central and East Europe. Warszawa: Semper. pp. 67–74. ISBN 9788386951338.
- Baán, István (1999). "The Metropolitanate of Tourkia: The Organization of the Byzantine Church in Hungary in the Middle Ages". Byzanz und Ostmitteleuropa 950-1453. Wiesbaden: Harrassowitz Verlag. pp. 45–53. ISBN 9783447041461.
- Balogh, Margit - Gergely, Jenő: Egyházak az újkori Magyarországon (1790-1992) - Adattár (MTA Történettudományi Intézete, Budapest, 1996)
- Koszta, László (2013). A kalocsai érseki tartomány kialakulása [Formation of the Archdiocese of Kalocsa] (in Hungarian). Pécsi Történettudományért Kulturális Egyesület. ISBN 978-963-89482-2-9.
- Fallenbüchl, Zoltán: Magyarország főispánjai 1526-1848 (Argumentum, Budapest, 1994)
- Fallenbüchl, Zoltán: Magyarország főméltóságai (Maecenas, 1988)
- Karácsonyi, János: Magyarország egyháztörténete főbb vonásaiban 970-től 1900-ig (Könyvértékesítő Vállalat, Budapest, 1985)
- Korai Magyar Történeti Lexikon (9-14. század), főszerkesztő: Kristó, Gyula, szerkesztők: Engel, Pál és Makk, Ferenc (Akadémiai Kiadó, Budapest, 1994)
- Magyarország Történeti Kronológiája I-III. – A kezdetektől 1526-ig; 1526-1848, 1848-1944, főszerkesztő: Benda, Kálmán (Akadémiai Kiadó, Budapest, 1981, 1982, 1993)
- Magyar Történelmi Fogalomtár I-II. – A-K; L-ZS, főszerkesztő: Bán, Péter (Gondolat, Budapest, 1989)
- Thoroczkay, Gábor (2009). Írások az Árpád-korról: történeti és historiográfiai tanulmányok [About the Age of the Árpáds: Historical and Historiographical Studies] (in Hungarian). L'Harmattan. ISBN 978-963-236-165-9.
