= Rahewin =

German chronicler

Rahewin was an important German chronicler at the abbey of Freising in Bavaria. He was secretary and chaplain to Otto von Freising; he also continued the work of his master Otto von Freising, Gesta Friderici, books 3 and 4, between 1157 and 1160. Rahewin was also a poet. His style makes use of the cursus tardus in which the stress falls on the third and sixth syllables from the end. He died between 1170 and 1177.

== Sources ==
- Sidwell, Keith C. (1995). Reading medieval Latin. Cambridge: Cambridge University Press. ISBN 0-521-44239-7. OCLC 33819703..
