= Euphrosyne of Kiev =

Queen consort of Hungary from 1146 to 1152

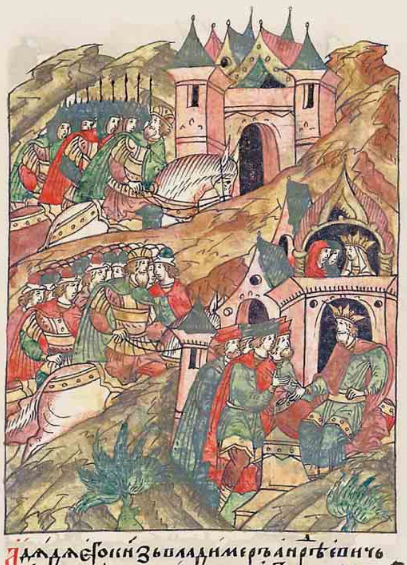
- Flight of Vladimir Mstislavich to Hungary; Vladimir with his brother-in-law, Géza II of Hungary, and his wife and sister of Vladimir, Euphrosyne of Kiev

Queen consort of Hungary
- Tenure: 1146–1162
- Born: c. 1130
- Died: c. 1193
- Spouse: Géza II of Hungary
- Issue: Stephen III of Hungary, Béla III of Hungary, Elisabeth, Duchess of Bohemia, Prince Géza, Árpád (died in infancy), Odola, Duchess of Bohemia, Helena, Duchess of Austria, Margaret
- Dynasty: Monomakhovichi
- Father: Mstislav I of Kiev
- Mother: Liubava Dmitrievna Zavidich

Euphrosyne of Kiev (also Euphrosine of Novgorod; Hungarian: Eufrozina; c. 1130 – c. 1193) was Queen consort of Hungary by marriage to King Géza II of Hungary.

== Life ==
Euphrosyne was the first daughter of Grand Prince Mstislav I of Kiev and his second wife, Liubava Dmitrievna Zavidich.

=== Hungary ===
In 1146, Euphrosyne married King Géza II of Hungary, who had come of age shortly before.

During her husband's reign, Euphrosyne did not intervene in the politics of the kingdom. However, after his death on 31 May 1162, her influence strengthened over their son, King Stephen III. The young king had to struggle against his uncles Ladislaus and Stephen to save his throne, and Euphrosyne took an active part in the struggles. She persuaded King Vladislaus II of Bohemia to give military assistance to her son against the invasion of the Emperor Manuel I Komnenos.

Euphrosyne's favourite son was the youngest, Duke Géza of Hungary. When King Stephen III died on 4 March 1172, she was planning to ensure his succession against her older son, Béla, who had been living in the court of the Emperor Manuel I Komnenos. However, Béla came back, and he was crowned on 13 January 1173, although the Archbishop Lucas of Esztergom denied his coronation. Shortly after, King Béla III arrested his brother, which increased the tension between Euphrosyne and her son. Duke Géza soon managed to escape, probably with Euphrosyne's help, but in 1177 he was again arrested.

=== Later life ===
In 1186, Euphrosyne tried to release her younger son again, but she failed. King Béla III ordered the arrest of Euphrosyne and kept her confined in the fortress of Barancs (Serbian: Braničevo). Shortly after, Euphrosyne was set free, but she was obliged to leave the kingdom for Constantinople. From Constantinople she moved to Jerusalem where she lived as a nun in the convent of the Hospitallers, and then in the Basilian monastery of Saint Sabbas.

== Issue ==
Euphrosyne and Geza had:

- King Stephen III of Hungary (1147 – 4 March 1172); married, Agnes of Austria (1154–1182), had issue.
- King Béla III of Hungary (1148 – 23 April 1196); married, firstly, Agnes of Antioch, had issue; married, secondly, Margaret of France, widow of Henry the Young King, no issue.
- Elisabeth (c. 1149 – after 1189); married Frederick of Bohemia
- Géza (c. 1151 – before 1210).
- Árpád, died in infancy.
- Odola (c. 1156 – 1199); married Sviatopluk of Bohemia.
- Helena (c. 1158 – 25 May 1199); married Leopold V, Duke of Austria and had issue.
- Margaret (1162 – bef. 1208), married, firstly, Isaac Dukas "Makrodukas" and, secondly, Andrew, Ispán of Somogy.

== Sources ==
- Soltész, István: Árpád-házi királynék (Gabo, 1999)
- Kristó, Gyula – Makk, Ferenc: Az Árpád-ház uralkodói (IPC Könyvek, 1996)
- Hunyadi, Zsolt (2008). "Hospitaller Commanderies in the Kingdom of Hungary (c.1150-c.1130)". In Barber, Malcolm; Mallia-Milanes, Victor; Nicholson, Helen J. (eds.). The Military Orders: History and heritage. Vol. 3. Ashgate.
- Louda, Jirí; MacLagan, Michael (1999). Lines of Succession: Heraldry of the Royal Families of Europe (2nd ed.). Little, Brown and Company.
- Mielke, Christopher (2021). The Archaeology and Material Culture of Queenship in Medieval Hungary, 1000–1395. Palgrave Macmillan.
- Encyclopædia Britannica (Subscription required)
- Geza II of Hungary (in Hungarian)

Euphrosyne of Kiev Monomakhovichi Born: c. 1130 Died: c. 1193
Royal titles
Preceded by Helena of Raška	Queen consort of Hungary; 1146–1162	Succeeded by Agnes of Austria
