= Stephen III of Hungary =

King of Hungary and Croatia from 1162 to 1172

Stephen III
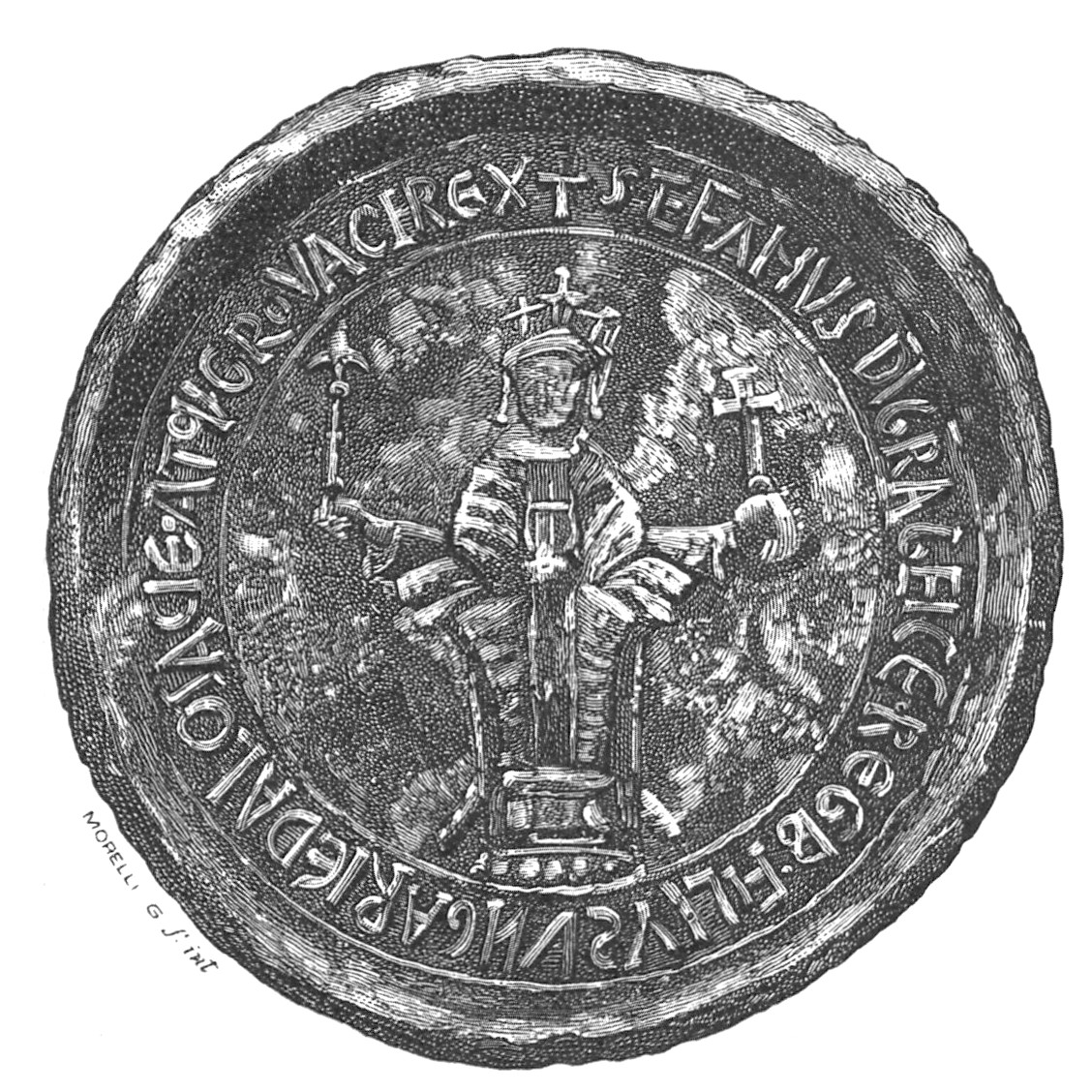
- Stephen III's seal

King of Hungary and Croatia Contested by Ladislaus II (1162–63), and by Stephen IV (1163–1165)
- Reign: 1162–1172
- Coronation: June 1162, Székesfehérvár
- Predecessor: Géza II
- Successor: Béla III
- Born: Summer of 1147
- Died: 4 March 1172 (aged 24–25)
- Burial: Esztergom
- Spouse: Agnes of Austria
- Issue Detail: Béla (died young); Unnamed son
- Dynasty: Árpád dynasty
- Father: Géza II of Hungary
- Mother: Euphrosyne of Kiev
- Religion: Roman Catholic

Stephen III (Hungarian: III. István, Croatian: Stjepan III.; Slovak: Štefan III.; summer of 1147 – 4 March 1172) was King of Hungary and Croatia between 1162 and 1172. He was crowned king in early June 1162, shortly after the death of his father, Géza II. However, his two uncles, Ladislaus and Stephen, who had joined the court of the Byzantine Empire, challenged his right to the crown. Only six weeks after his coronation, the Byzantine Emperor Manuel I Komnenos launched an expedition against Hungary, forcing the Hungarian lords to accept Ladislaus' rule. Stephen sought refuge in Austria, but returned and seized Pressburg (now Bratislava in Slovakia). Ladislaus, who died on 14 January 1163, was succeeded by Stephen's younger uncle and namesake, Stephen IV, without resistance, but his rule was unpopular. The young Stephen defeated his uncle on 19 June 1163 and expelled him from Hungary.

Stephen IV attempted to regain his throne with Emperor Manuel I's support, but the latter made peace with Stephen III. He agreed to send his younger brother, Béla, to Constantinople and to allow the Byzantines to seize Béla's duchy, which included Croatia, Dalmatia and Sirmium. In an attempt to recapture these territories, Stephen III waged wars against the Byzantine Empire between 1164 and 1167, but could not defeat the Byzantines.

Historians attribute the creation of the "Székesfehérvár laws", the first example of extensive privileges granted to a town in the Kingdom of Hungary, to him. He concluded a concordat with the Holy See in 1169, renouncing the control of the appointment of the prelates. He died childless.

== Childhood (1147–1162) ==
Stephen was the eldest child of Géza II of Hungary and his wife Euphrosyne of Kiev. He was born in the summer of 1147 when the French crusaders were marching through Hungary towards the Holy Land. King Louis VII of France sponsored his baptism. One Lady Margaret, who wrote her last will in 1152, mentioned that "King Géza reigned together with his son, Duke Stephen" in that year, indicating that the King had officially nominated the child Stephen as his heir. However, his position as his father's successor remained insecure, especially after his two uncles, Stephen and Ladislaus, left Hungary in the late 1150s. They would settle in the court of the Byzantine Emperor Manuel I Komnenos in Constantinople. Géza II granted Dalmatia, Croatia, and Sirmium to his younger son Béla as an appanage shortly before his death.

== Reign ==
=== Struggle for the throne (1162–1164) ===
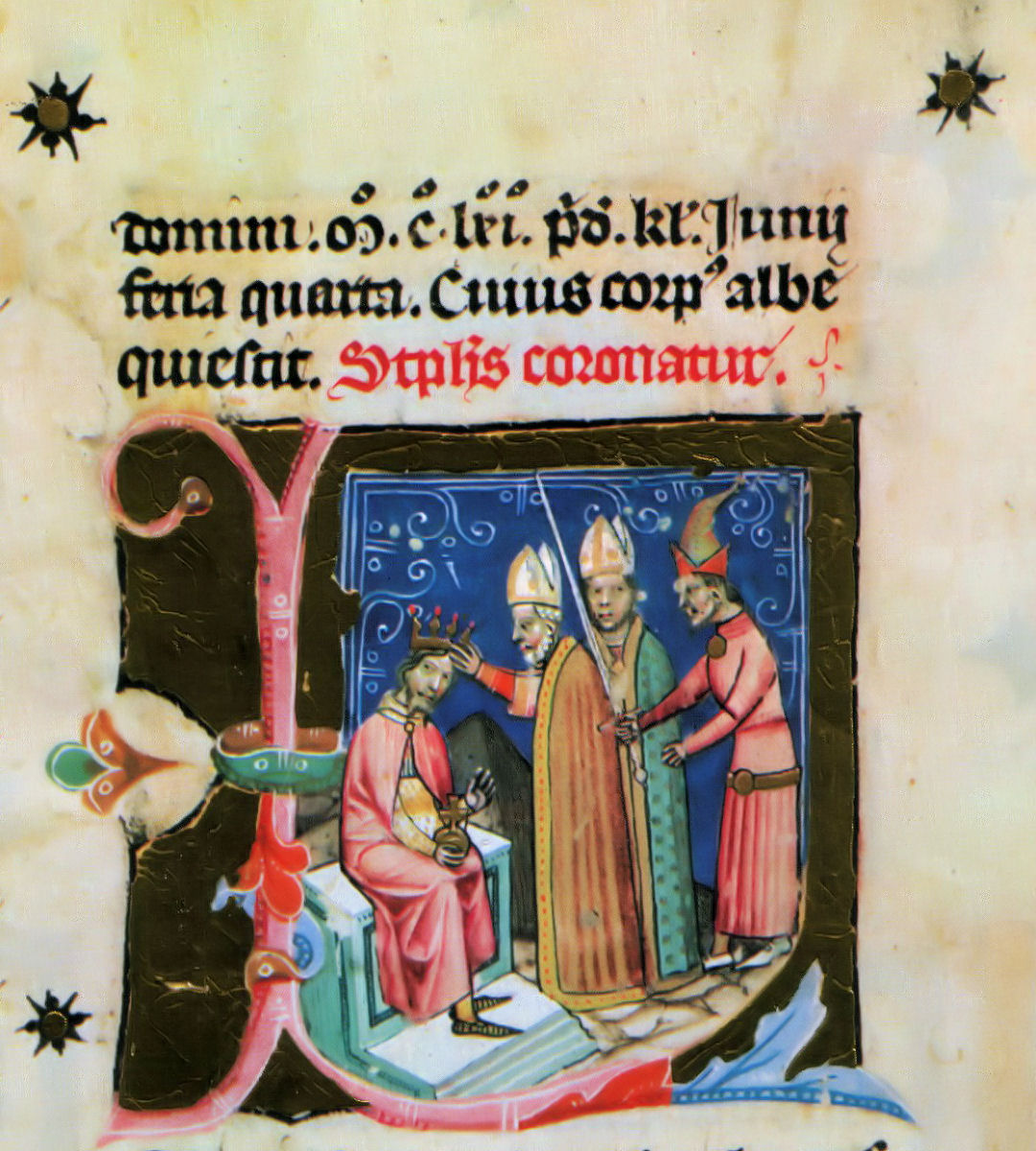
Stephen III is crowned king (from the Illuminated Chronicle)

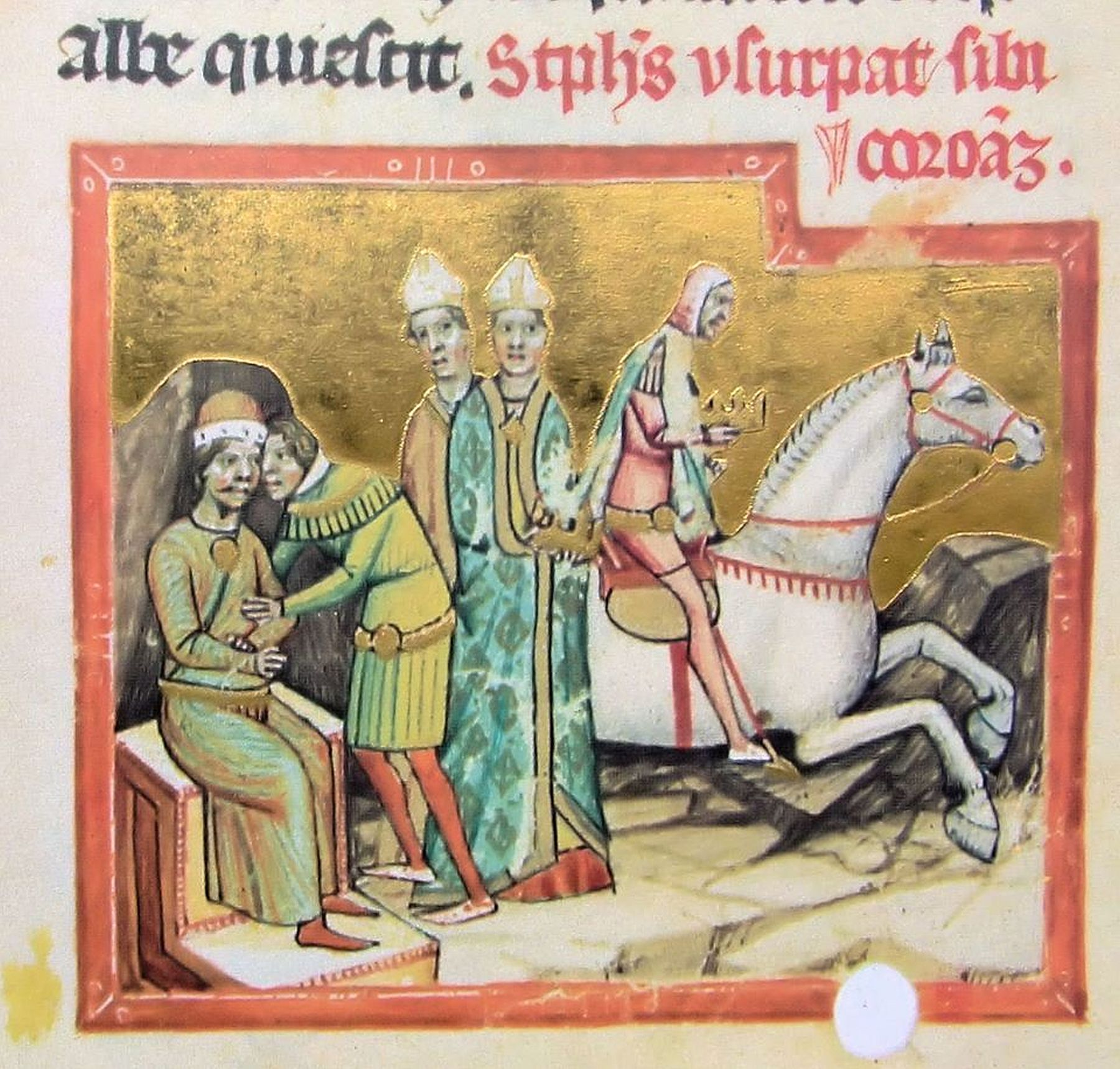
Stephen III's uncle, Ladislaus II usurps the throne (from the Illuminated Chronicle)

Géza II died on 31 May 1162. Lucas, Archbishop of Esztergom, crowned the 15-year-old Stephen king without delay. On hearing of Géza II's death, Emperor Manuel hastened towards Hungary, because he "put a high value on the overlordship" of the country, according to the Byzantine historian John Kinnamos. Another Byzantine historian, Niketas Choniates, wrote that the Emperor decided to support the young King's uncle and namesake, Stephen, to acquire the throne in the hope that "he might receive the undisputed and guaranteed possession" of Sirmium and Zimony (now Zemun in Serbia) from his protégé. When supporting the claim of the late King's brother to the crown, the Emperor referred to "the law of the Hungarians" which prescribed that the crown should pass "always to the survivors of brothers", according to Kinnamos.

Emperor Manuel dispatched an army to Hungary which advanced as far as Haram (now Ram, Serbia) where his envoys opened negotiations with the Hungarian barons. Bribed by the Byzantines and fearful of an invasion by the Emperor, the magnates agreed to accept Ladislaus, who was the older of the young King's two uncles, as a "compromise candidate". The young Stephen's army was routed at Kapuvár. He fled from Hungary and sought refuge in Austria six weeks after his coronation. Archbishop Lucas was one of the few who remained loyal to the young monarch, refusing to crown his uncle. After Mikó, Archbishop of Kalocsa, performed Ladislaus's coronation, Archbishop Lucas even excommunicated the usurper, stating that he had unlawfully seized the crown from his nephew.

Stephen III returned from Austria and captured Pressburg. He could not take advantage of his uncle's death on 14 January 1163, because Ladislaus II was succeeded by his younger brother, Stephen IV. However, Stephen IV's unveiled support for the interests of the Byzantine Empire caused discontent among the Hungarian barons. The young Stephen mustered an army of the barons who had deserted his uncle and supplemented it with German mercenaries. Stephen III defeated his uncle at Székesfehérvár on 19 June 1163. The elder Stephen was captured, but Stephen III released him upon the advice of Archbishop Lucas. The archbishop, along with the Dowager Queen Euphrosyne, remained the young monarch's principal advisors throughout his reign. The dethroned Stephen IV first fled to the Holy Roman Empire, but left shortly afterwards for the Byzantine Empire, where Emperor Manuel again promised him support.

=== Wars with the Byzantine Empire (1164–1167) ===
Emperor Manuel sent an army to Hungary to help Stephen IV to regain the throne from his nephew. The young Stephen sought assistance from Vladislaus, King of Bohemia, against his uncle and the Byzantines, but the Bohemian barons refused to fight. Thereafter Stephen III sent envoys to Emperor Manuel, but "they promised nothing genuine", according to Kinnamos. The Emperor continued his campaign, but in short "realized that it was then impossible for" his protégé "to rule the Hungarians' land", and opened negotiations with Stephen III. According to their peace treaty, Emperor Manuel recognized the rule of the young Stephen, and the latter agreed to send his brother, Béla, to Constantinople. Stephen III also promised that he would allow the Byzantines to take control of Béla's duchy.

Abandoned by Emperor Manuel, Stephen IV approached Frederick I, Holy Roman Emperor. Around the same time, a group of Hungarian barons and prelates sent a letter to Emperor Frederick, stating that they were willing to accept his suzerainty. Stephen III also dispatched his envoys to Frederick, who decided not to intervene, but ordered his vassals—the King of Bohemia, the Duke of Austria, and the Margrave of Styria—to keep an eye on the political situation in Hungary. King Vladislaus' son, Sviatopluk, even married Stephen III's sister, Odola. The betrothal of Stephen III to an unnamed daughter of Yaroslav Osmomysl, Prince of Halych, was also arranged around this time.

Next year Stephen broke his treaty with Emperor Manuel I and "usurped Béla's heritage", according to Kinnamos. A charter of 1164 of Peter, Archbishop of Spalato (now Split, Croatia) was dated in reference to the rule of Stephen III and his ban, Ampud, suggesting that at least a part of Béla's duchy—Central Dalmatia—was under Stephen III's rule in that year. On the other hand, Stephen III's dethroned uncle invaded Sirmium where masses of the residents celebrated his return. Accompanied by the forces of King Vladislaus of Bohemia, and auxiliary troops from Austria and Halych, Stephen III launched a campaign against him. Emperor Manuel I, who was about to march against Armenian Cilicia, returned to the Danube and stormed into Hungary, advancing as far as Bács (now Bač, Serbia). He contacted King Vladislaus and persuaded him to negotiate a peace treaty with Stephen III. Abandoned by his most important ally, Stephen III was obliged to renounce Sirmium in favor of the Byzantine Empire, but only after the Emperor promised that he would never support his uncle. Even so, Emperor Manuel allowed the dethroned king to stay in Sirmium.

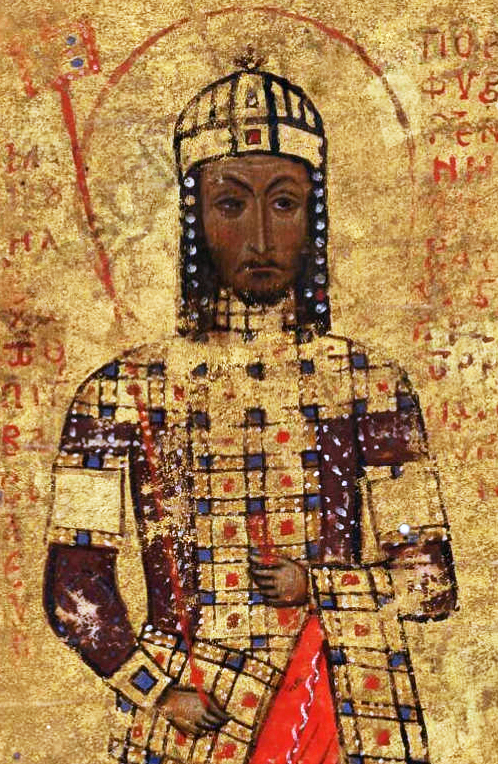
Byzantine Emperor Manuel I Komnenos who seized large parts of Stephen III's kingdom

We have come, my boy, not to wage war on the Hungarians but to recover his land for Béla, your brother, not something which we have torn away by our might, but which you and your father long before granted. Also to rescue from peril your uncle Stephen, who is related by marriage to our majesty. If it is according to your will that Béla should be our son-in-law, something which was previously agreed by you, why do you quickly abandon our friendship by failing to render him the land? If you oppose the marriage, and something else seems right to you in regard to it, know that we abstain from constraining you further.

— Emperor Manuel I's letter of 1164 to Stephen III

In short, Stephen III invaded Dalmatia, although he had pledged to Vitale II Michiel, Doge of Venice, that he would withdraw from the Dalmatian towns. Upon Stephen's arrival the citizens of Zadar expelled the Venetian governor and accepted his suzerainty. He again stormed into Sirmium and laid siege to his uncle in Zimony in spring 1165. Emperor Manuel decided to make a counterattack, but a rebellion by his cousin Andronikos Komnenos prevented him from marching to the Danube. Nevertheless, Manuel I sent envoys to the monarchs who had earlier supported Stephen III, persuading them to remain neutral in the conflict. Stephen III's uncle died of poisoning during the siege of Zimony, on 11 April. The fortress soon fell to Stephen III. The Byzantine counter-offensive started at the end of June. An army under the command of Emperor Manuel I laid siege to Zimony and recaptured it; another Byzantine force invaded and occupied Bosnia and Dalmatia. The Venetian fleet intervened on the Byzantines' side in Dalmatia, forcing Zadar to again accept the rule of the Doge. Stephen III could only conclude a new peace treaty with Emperor Manuel after he renounced Sirmium and Dalmatia.

[Stephen] sent envoys to the emperor, men of the aristocracy and one who enjoyed the office of bishop, and agreed to render [Sirmium] again to the Romans, and in addition the whole of Dalmatia. When they came in sight of the emperor, they uttered what had been commanded to them and petitioned the emperor to abandon his wrath. At first he refused, saying, "It would indeed be estimable, envoys, if someone thought it proper to restore those things which he had previously stolen. We hold [Sirmium], we have regained [Zimony], we are already masters of the Dalmatians, we are lords of all those together, of which you the givers have been deprived. So then is there among you another [Sirmium]? Is there another [Zimony] and Dalmatia which you now come giving us? ..." So he first answered them, then changing his mind, he said, "But then, so that you may know that we wish to make peace as a gift to you, who are Christians, come, take the oaths."

— John Kinnamos: Deeds of John and Manuel Comnenus

A Hungarian army under the command of Ispán Denis stormed into Sirmium once more in spring 1166. The Hungarians routed a Byzantine army, and occupied the whole province with the exception of Zimony. Emperor Manuel sent three armies against Hungary. The first army, which was under the command of protostrator Alexios Axuch and Stephen III's brother, Béla, was stationed by the Danube to distract attention from the movements of the two other units, which plundered Transylvania under the command of Leon Batatzes and John Doukas. The Byzantine campaign caused great devastation in the eastern territories of the Kingdom of Hungary, forcing Stephen III to seek reconciliation. Upon his request, Henry Jasomirgott, Duke of Austria, whose wife was Emperor Manuel's niece, mediated an armistice. At the end of the year, Stephen married the Duke's daughter Agnes. Around the same time, a Hungarian army invaded Dalmatia and captured Nikephoros Chalouphes, the Byzantine governor of the province. Stephen confirmed estates in Biograd na Moru and the privileges of Šibenik in 1166 and 1167, respectively, proving that the two towns accepted his suzerainty after the campaign.

Emperor Manuel dispatched an army to Sirmium and sent his fleet to Zimony after Easter 1167. The Hungarians assembled their troops, and recruited no small number of allied forces as mercenaries, especially Germans, according to Choniates. The contemporaneous Rahewin writes that Stephen III "made war on the emperor of the Greeks" because he had received and assisted his brother, Béla. According to Rahewin and Henry of Mügeln, Stephen received support from his father-in-law, Duke Henry Jasomirgott. However, the Byzantine army led by Andronikos Kontostephanos annihilated the Hungarians, who were under the command of Ispán Denis, in a decisive battle which was fought near Zimony on 8 July. Kinnamos wrote that "the war on the Hungarians" concluded on the battlefield. According to Henry of Mügeln, Stephen signed a peace treaty renouncing the duchy that their father had bequeathed upon his brother, Béla. He also came to terms with Doge Vitale Michiel, giving his niece, Mary, to the Doge's son, Nicholas, on 17 December 1167, according to the early 13th-century History of the Doges of Venice.

=== Later years (1167–1172) ===
There is evidence that suggests that Stephen seized Church revenues to finance his war with the Byzantine Empire. The correspondence of Thomas Becket and John of Salisbury reveals that the principles of the Gregorian Reform were not fully introduced in Hungary "on account of the unbridled acts of tyranny by the seculars against the apostolic institutions" in the late 1160s. Stephen transferred Prodanus, Bishop of Zagreb from his diocese without consulting the Holy See. Pope Alexander III sent his legate Cardinal Manfred to Hungary in 1169, who discussed the debated issues with the king, the queen mother, and the prelates. The negotiations ended with an agreement that prohibited the monarch from arbitrarily deposing or relocating the prelates or confiscating their property. The Pope supported Stephen against Archbishop Lucas of Esztergom when the Archbishop attempted to hinder the consecration of the King's protégé, Andrew, Bishop-elect of Győr, because of his allegedly non-canonical election.

The Knights Templar settled in Hungary during Stephen's reign. According to historians Ferenc Makk and Pál Engel, Stephen III granted special privileges to the Walloon settlers of Székesfehérvár, including their exemption of customs duties throughout the kingdom. In the 13th century, the same privileges, the so-called "Székesfehérvár laws", were granted to additional towns, contributing to their development.

Stephen died on 4 March 1172. Arnold of Lübeck, who was in Hungary at that time, wrote that a rumor spreading in the country attributed the 25-year-old monarch's unexpected death to poisoning. Stephen was buried in Esztergom.

== Family ==
Ancestors of Stephen III of Hungary

16. Géza I of Hungary
8. Álmos, Duke of Croatia
17. Sophia
4. Béla II of Hungary
18. Sviatopolk II of Kiev
9. Predslava of Kiev
2. Géza II of Hungary
20. Marko
10. Uroš I of Serbia
5. Helena of Rascia
22. Constantine Diogenes
11. Anna Diogene
23. Theodora, daughter of John Komnenos
1. Stephen III of Hungary
24. Vsevolod I
12. Vladimir II Monomakh of Kiev
25. Anastasia, daughter of Constantine IX Monomachos
6. Mstislav I of Kiev
26. Harold II of England
13. Gytha of Wessex
27. Edyth Swannesha
3. Euphrosyne of Kiev
14. Dmitry Saviditsch, of Novgorod
7. Ljubava Savidtsch

Stephen's betrothal to the daughter of Yaroslav Osmomysl of Halych was broken in 1166. He married Agnes of Austria at the end of the year. From this marriage a son, Béla, was born in 1167, but the child died in the same year. Agnes survived her husband and was pregnant at the time of his death. Her father, who was staying in Hungary when Stephen III died, took Agnes back to Austria. Agnes gave birth to a second son, but his fate is unknown. She later married Herman, Duke of Carinthia.

== Sources ==
=== Primary sources ===
- Deeds of John and Manuel Comnenus by John Kinnamos (Translated by Charles M. Brand) (1976). Columbia University Press. ISBN 0-231-04080-6.
- O City of Byzantium, Annals of Niketas Choniatēs (Translated by Harry J. Magoulias) (1984). Wayne State University Press. ISBN 978-0-8143-1764-8.
- The Deeds of Frederick Barbarossa by Otto of Freising and his Continuator, Rahewin (Translated and annotated with an introduction by Charles Christopher Mierow with the collaboration of Richard Emery) (2004). Columbia University Press. ISBN 0-231-13419-3.

=== Secondary sources ===
- Bartl, Július; Čičaj, Viliam; Kohútova, Mária; Letz, Róbert; Segeš, Vladimír; Škvarna, Dušan (2002). Slovak History: Chronology & Lexicon. Bolchazy-Carducci Publishers, Slovenské Pedegogické Nakladatel'stvo. ISBN 0-86516-444-4.
- Bodri, Ferenc (2003). Lukács érsek és kora [Archbishop Lucas and his Times] (in Hungarian). Kossuth Kiadó. ISBN 963-09-4474-X.
- Curta, Florin (2006). Southeastern Europe in the Middle Ages, 500–1250. Cambridge University Press. ISBN 978-0-521-89452-4.
- Engel, Pál (2001). The Realm of St Stephen: A History of Medieval Hungary, 895–1526. I.B. Tauris Publishers. ISBN 1-86064-061-3.
- Fine, John V. A. Jr. (1991) [1983]. The Early Medieval Balkans: A Critical Survey from the Sixth to the Late Twelfth Century. Ann Arbor: University of Michigan Press. ISBN 0-472-08149-7.
- Kristó, Gyula; Makk, Ferenc (1996). Az Árpád-ház uralkodói [Rulers of the House of Árpád] (in Hungarian). I.P.C. Könyvek. ISBN 963-7930-97-3.
- Kubinyi, András (1994). "székesfehérvári jog [Székesfehérvár laws]". In Kristó, Gyula; Engel, Pál; Makk, Ferenc (eds.). Korai magyar történeti lexikon (9–14. század) [Encyclopedia of the Early Hungarian History (9th–14th centuries)] (in Hungarian). Akadémiai Kiadó. pp. 628–629. ISBN 963-05-6722-9.
- Makk, Ferenc (1989). The Árpáds and the Comneni: Political Relations between Hungary and Byzantium in the 12th century (Translated by György Novák). Akadémiai Kiadó. ISBN 963-05-5268-X.
- Makk, Ferenc (1994). "III. István". In Kristó, Gyula; Engel, Pál; Makk, Ferenc (eds.). Korai magyar történeti lexikon (9–14. század) [Encyclopedia of the Early Hungarian History (9th–14th centuries)] (in Hungarian). Akadémiai Kiadó. p. 293. ISBN 963-05-6722-9.
- Stephenson, Paul (2000). Byzantium's Balkan Frontier: A Political Study of the Northern Balkans, 900–1204. Cambridge University Press. ISBN 978-0-521-02756-4.
- Treadgold, Warren (1997). A History of the Byzantine State and Society. Stanford, California: Stanford University Press. ISBN 0-8047-2630-2.

Stephen III of Hungary House of Árpád Born: 1147 Died: 4 March 1172
Regnal titles
Preceded by Géza II	King of Hungary and Croatia; 1162–1172 with Ladislaus II (1162–1163); Stephen IV (1163–1165) (as contenders)	Succeeded by Béla III
