= Coronation of the Hungarian monarch =

Legitimation ceremony in the Kingdom of Hungary

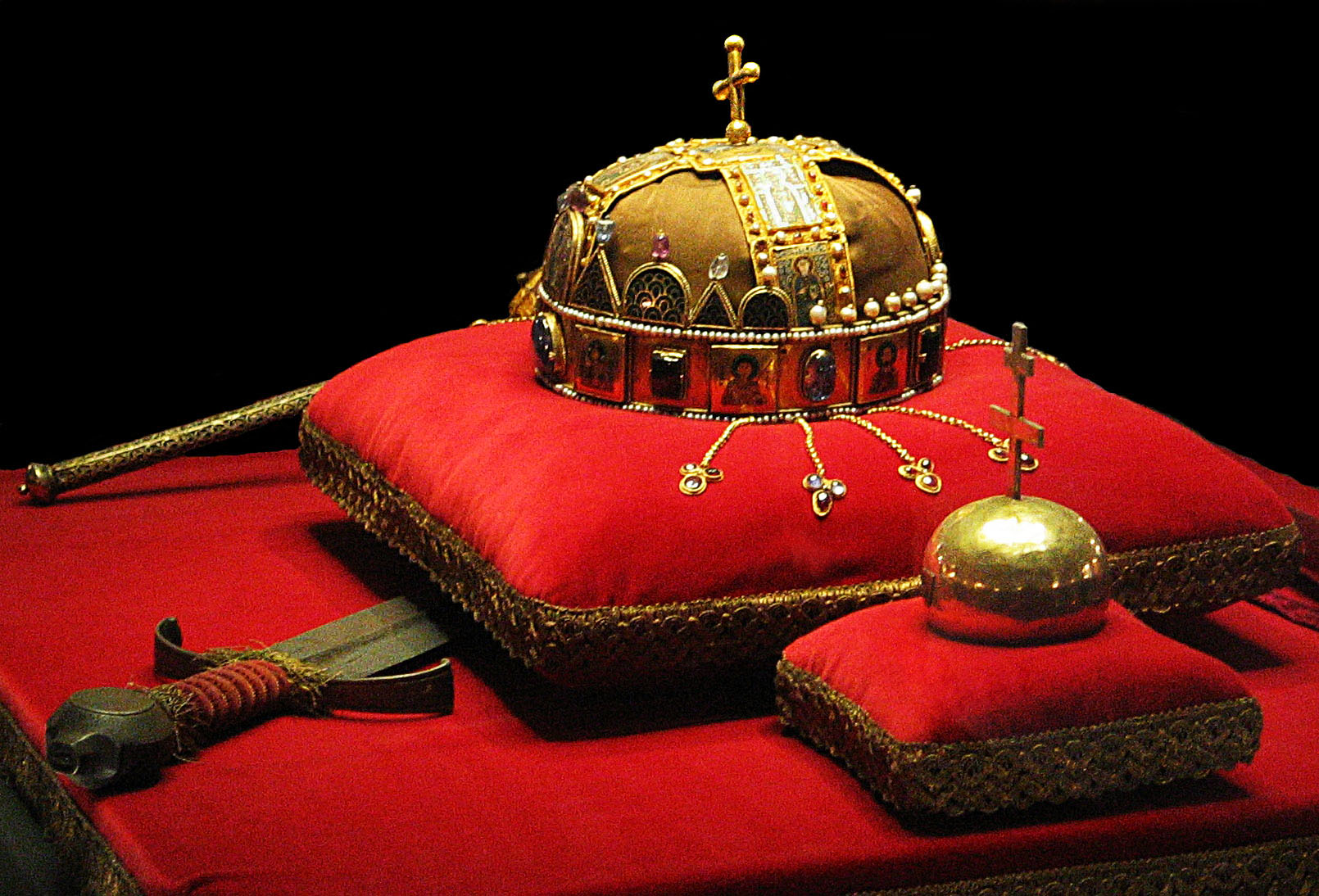
Holy Crown of Hungary (Saint Stephen's Crown), and other pieces of the Hungarian Regalia

The coronation of the Hungarian monarch was a ceremony in which the king or queen of the Kingdom of Hungary was formally crowned and invested with regalia. It corresponded to the coronation ceremonies in other European monarchies. While in countries like France and England the king's reign began immediately upon the death of his predecessor, in Hungary the coronation was absolutely indispensable: if it were not properly executed, the Kingdom stayed "orphaned". All monarchs had to be crowned as King of Hungary in order to promulgate laws and exercise his royal prerogatives in the Kingdom of Hungary. Starting from the Golden Bull of 1222, all new Hungarian monarchs had to take a coronation oath, by which they had to agree to uphold the constitutional arrangements of the country, and to preserve the liberties of their subjects and the territorial integrity of the realm.

== History ==
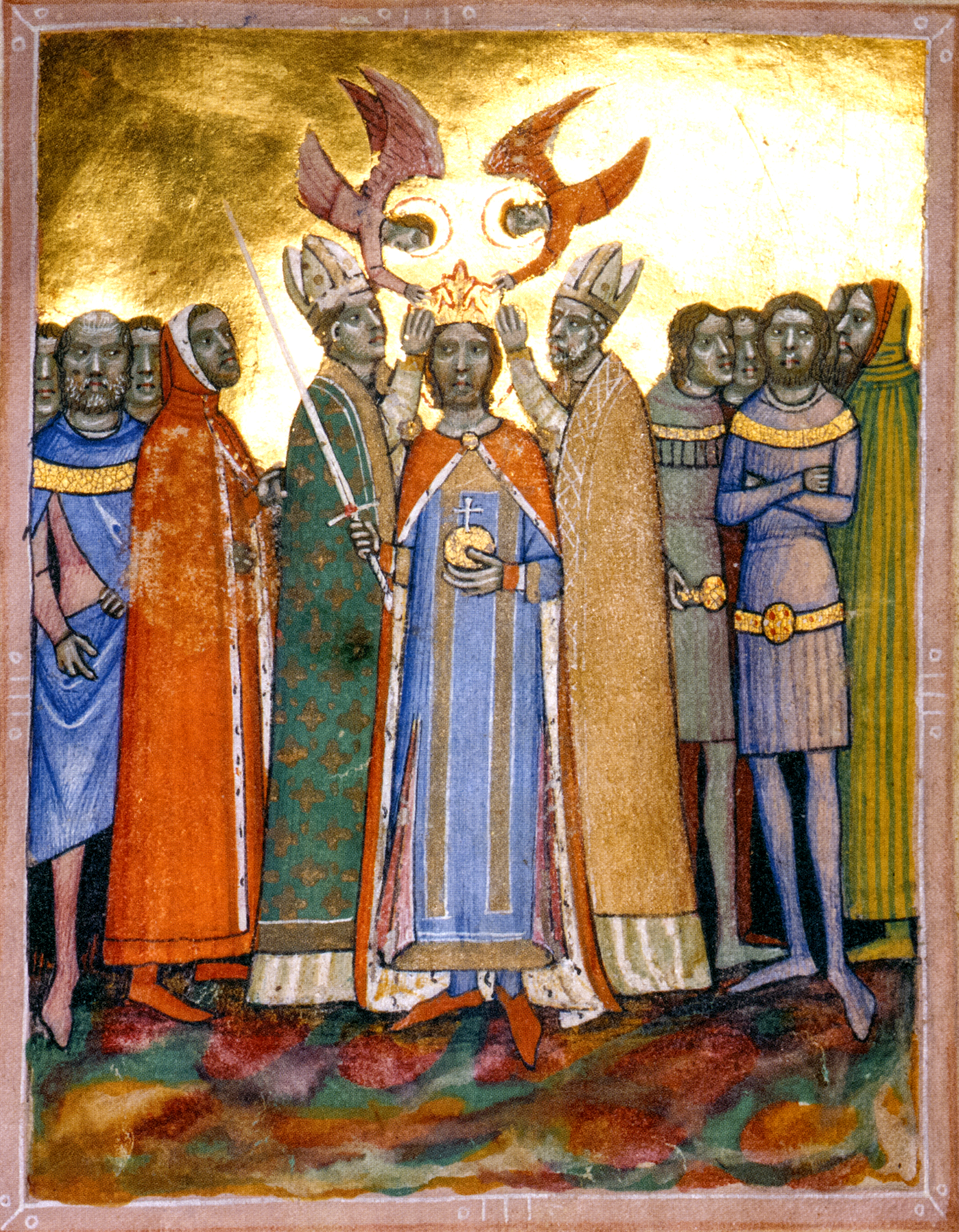
King Saint Ladislaus I of Hungary being crowned by angels. Image from the Chronicon Pictum of the 14th century.

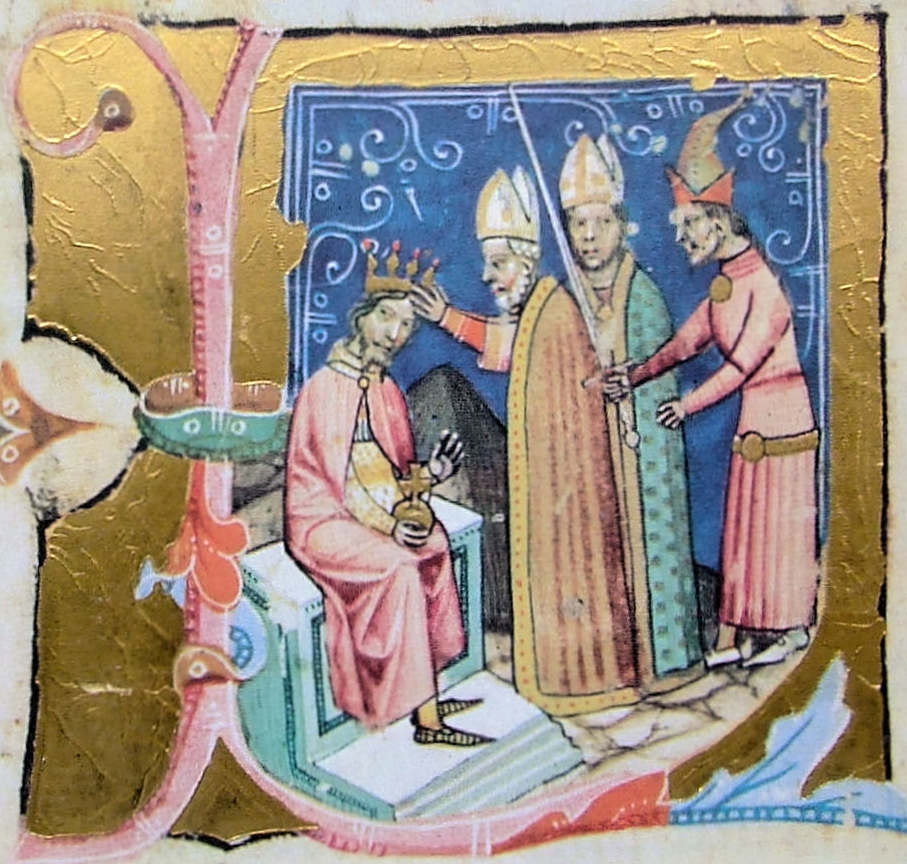
Coronation of King Stephen III in June 1162

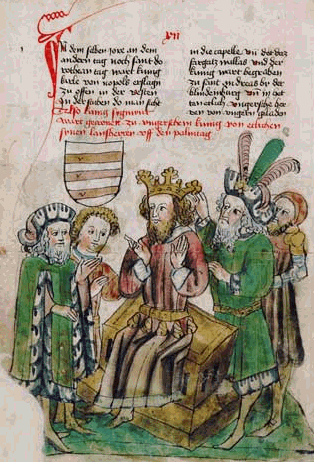
Coronation of King Sigismund on 31 March 1387

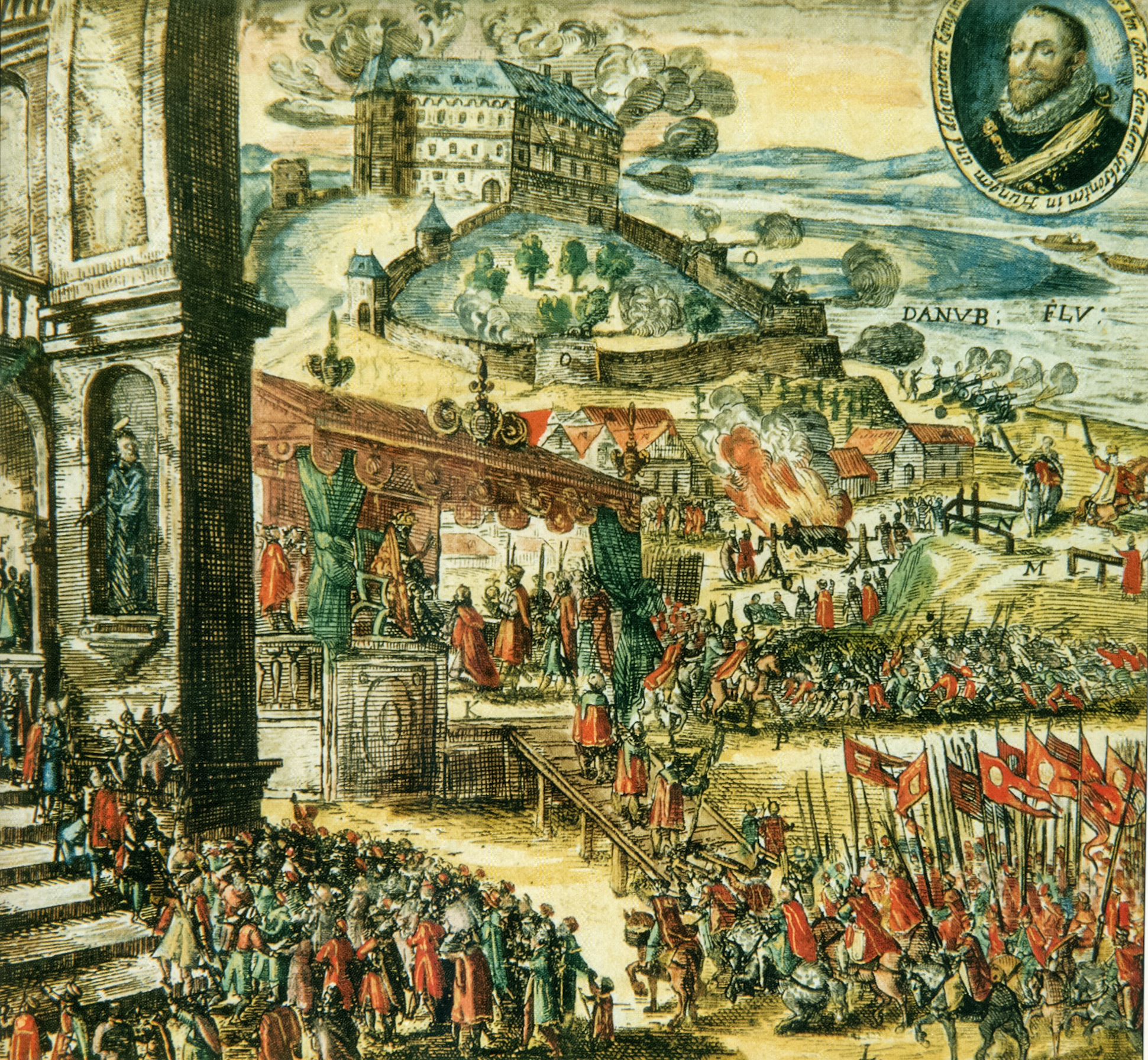
Coronation of Matthias II in Pressburg (today Bratislava) in 1608

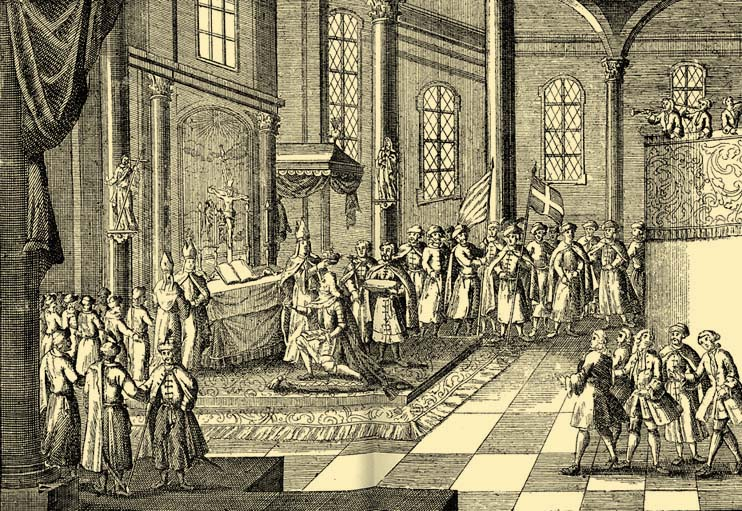
Coronation of King Charles III in Pressburg (today Bratislava).

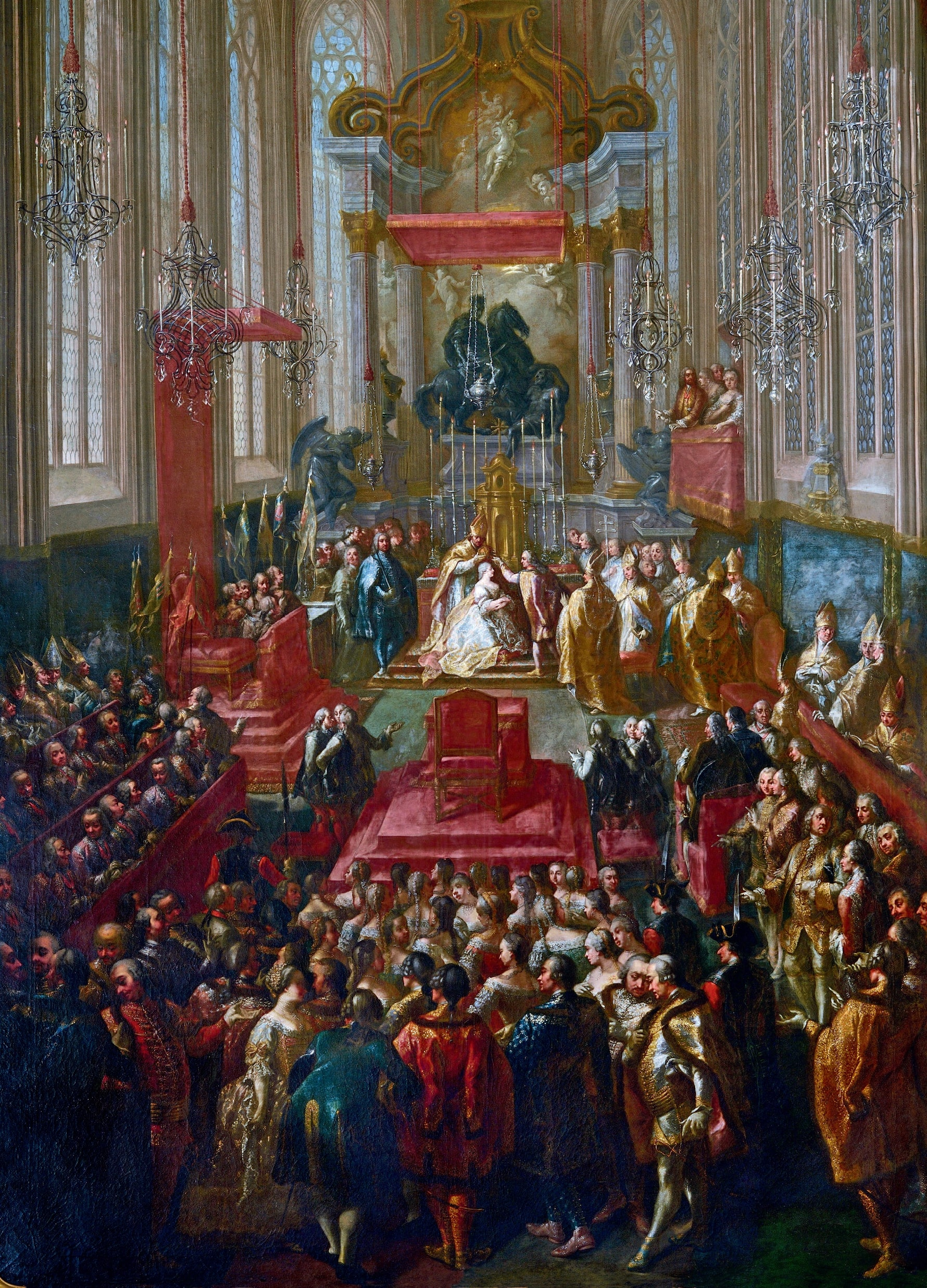
Coronation of Queen Maria II Theresa at St. Martin's Cathedral in 1741, in Pressburg (today Bratislava), site of Hungarian coronations between 1563 and 1830

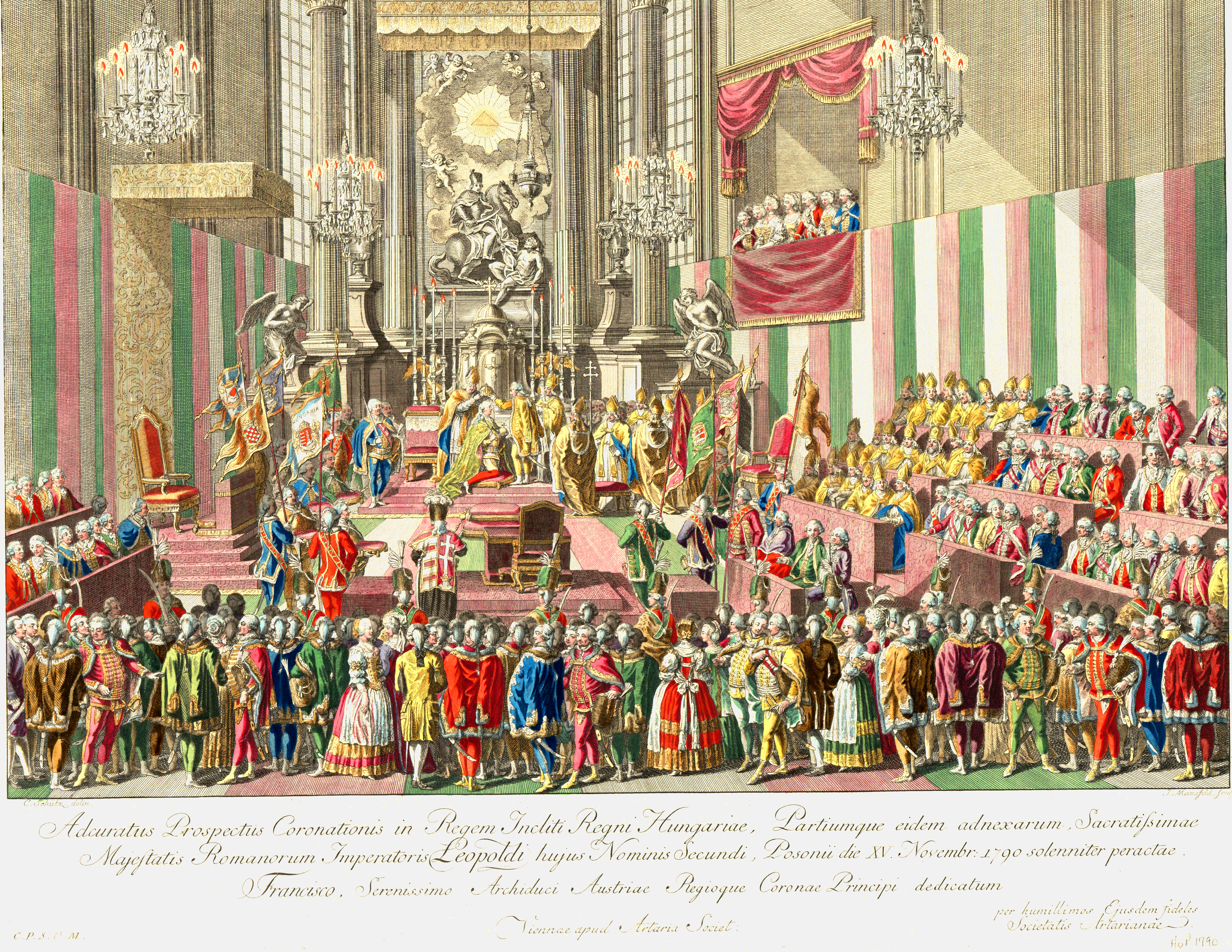
The coronation of Leopold II in Pressburg (today Bratislava), by Carl Schütz.

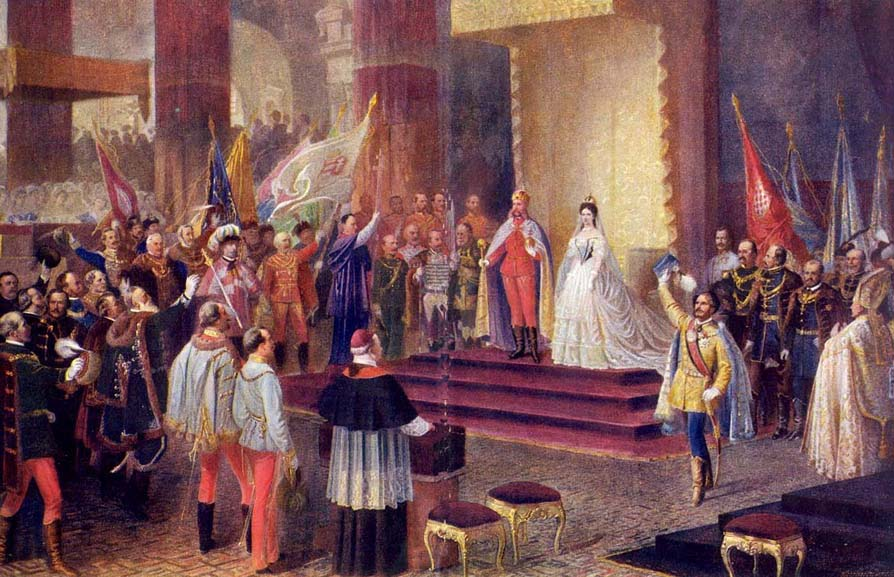
Coronation of King Francis Joseph and Queen Elisabeth on 8 June 1867 in Matthias Church in Budapest, site of the last two Hungarian coronations in 1867 and 1916

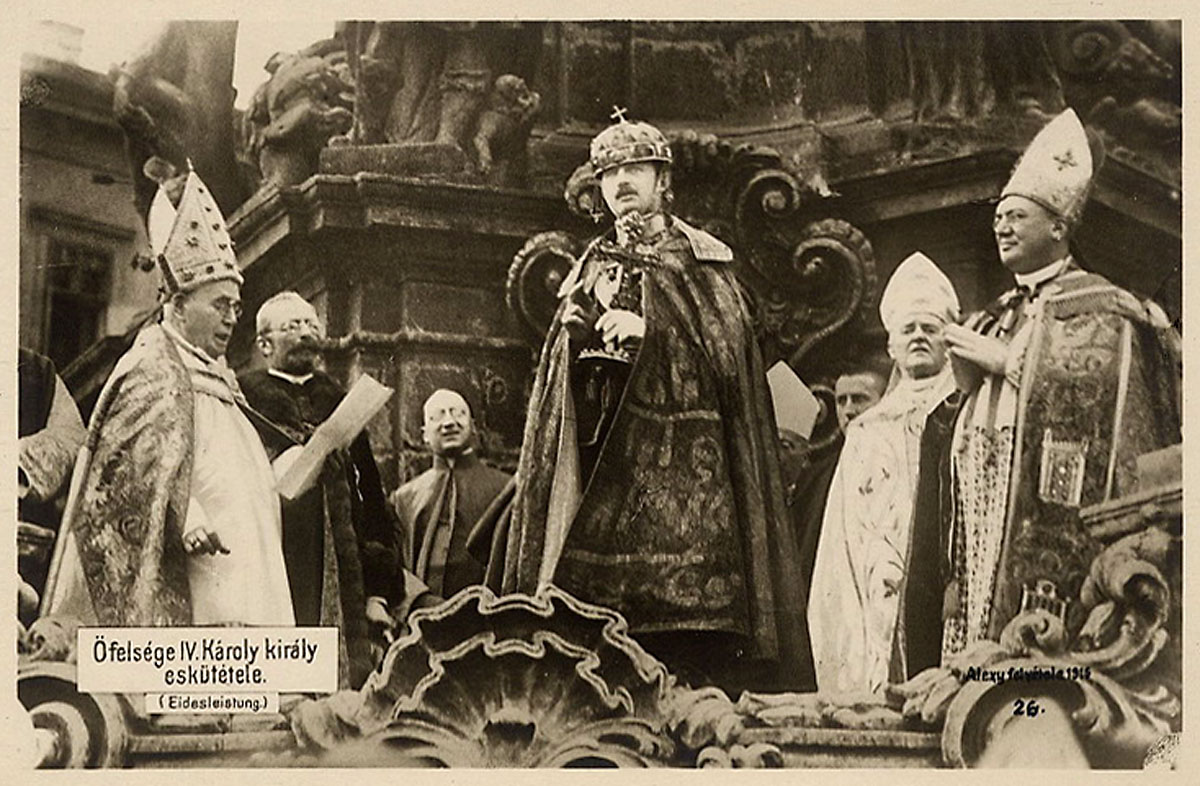
King Charles IV, taking his coronation oath on 30 December 1916 while standing on Holy Trinity Column outside Matthias Church

In the Middle Ages, all Hungarian coronations took place in Székesfehérvár Basilica, the burial place of the first crowned ruler of Hungary, Saint Stephen I. The Archbishop of Esztergom anointed the king or queen (however the Bishop of Veszprém claimed many times his right of crowning the queen consort, as an established tradition). The Archbishop then placed the Holy Crown of Hungary and the mantle of Saint Stephen on the head of the anointed person. The king was given a sceptre and a sword which denoted military power. Upon enthronement, the newly crowned king took the traditional coronation oath and promised to respect the people's rights. The Archbishop of Esztergom refused to preside over the coronation ceremony on three occasions; in such cases, the Archbishop of Kalocsa, the second-ranking prelate, performed the coronation. Other clergy and members of the nobility also had roles; most participants in the ceremony were required to wear ceremonial uniforms or robes. Many other government officials and guests attended, including representatives of foreign countries.

According to legend, the first Hungarian monarch, Saint Stephen I, was crowned in the St Adalbert Cathedral in Esztergom on 25 December 1000 or 1 January 1001. After his death he was buried in the Cathedral of Székesfehérvár which he started to build and where he had buried his son Saint Emeric. This cathedral became the traditional coronation church for the subsequent Hungarian monarchs starting with Peter Orseolo, Saint Stephen's nephew in 1038 up to John Zápolya coronation, before the Battle of Mohács in 1526. The huge Romanesque cathedral was one of the biggest of its kind in Europe, and later became the burying place of the medieval Hungarian monarchs.

After the death of King Andrew III, the last male member of the House of Árpád, in 1301, the successful claimant to the throne was a descendant of King Stephen V, and from the Capetian House of Anjou: King Charles I. However he had to be crowned three times, because of internal conflicts with the aristocrats, who were unwilling to accept his rule. He was crowned for the first time in May 1301 by the archbishop of Esztergom in the city of Esztergom, but with a simple crown. This meant that two of the conditions for his legitimacy were not fulfilled. After this, he was crowned for the second time in June 1309 by the archbishop of Esztergom, but in the city of Buda, and with a provisional crown, because the Crown of Saint Stephen was not yet in his possession. Finally, after obtaining the Holy Crown, Charles was crowned for his third time, but now in the Cathedral of Székesfehérvár, by the archbishop of Esztergom and with the Holy Crown.

After the death of King Albert in 1439, his widow, Elizabeth of Luxembourg, ordered one of her handmaidens to steal the Holy Crown that was kept in the castle of Visegrád, and with it she could crown her newborn son as King Ladislaus V. The relevance of the strict conditions from the coronation were fulfilled without questioning, and for example King Matthias Corvinus ascended to the throne in 1458, but he could be crowned with the Holy Crown only in 1464 after he recovered it from the hands of Frederick III, Holy Roman Emperor. Only after this did Matthias start his internal and institutional reforms in the Kingdom, having been considered as the legitimate ruler of Hungary.

When the Kingdom of Hungary was occupied by the Ottoman armies in the decades after the Battle of Mohács in 1526, the following Habsburg monarchs could not reach the city of Székesfehérvár (it lost in 1543) to be crowned. So in 1563 St. Martin's Cathedral in Pressburg (today Bratislava) became the cathedral of coronation and remained so until the coronation of 1830, after which coronations returned to Székesfehérvár, but not to the massive cathedral built by Saint Stephen, because that had been destroyed in 1601 when the Christian armies besieged the city. The Ottomans used the cathedral for gunpowder storage, and during the attack the building was destroyed.

== Legal requirements for coronation ==
Rulers of Hungary were not considered legitimate monarchs until they were crowned King of Hungary with the Holy Crown of Hungary. As women were not considered fit to rule Hungary, the two queens regnant, Mary and Maria Theresa, were crowned kings (Rex Hungariae) of Hungary.

Even during the long personal union of Austria and the Kingdom of Hungary, the Habsburg Emperor had to be crowned King of Hungary in order to promulgate laws there or exercise his royal prerogatives. The only Habsburg who reigned without being crowned in Hungary was Joseph II, who was called kalapos király in Hungarian ("the hatted king"). Before him, John Sigismund Zápolya and Gabriel Bethlen were elected kings, but they were never crowned nor generally accepted, and Imre Thököly was only declared King of Upper Hungary by Sultan Mehmed IV without being elected and crowned.

The final such rite was held in Budapest on 30 December 1916, when Emperor Charles I of Austria and Empress Zita were crowned as King Charles IV and Queen Zita of Hungary. The ceremony was rushed, due both to the war and the constitutional requirement for the Hungarian monarch to approve the state budget prior to the end of the calendar year. Charles IV's coronation was filmed however, and thus remains the only coronation of a Hungarian monarch ever documented in this way.

The Austro-Hungarian Empire dissolved with the end of World War I, although Hungary would later restore a titular monarchy from 1920-46—while forbidding Charles to resume the throne. A communist takeover in 1945 spelled the final end of this "kingdom without a king".

== Legal requirements in the Middle Ages ==
By the end of the 13th century, the customs of the Kingdom of Hungary prescribed that all the following (three requirements) shall be fulfilled when a new king ascended the throne:

- coronation by the Archbishop of Esztergom;
- coronation with the Holy Crown of Hungary;
- coronation in Székesfehérvár.

Afterwards, from 1387, the customs also required the election of the new king. Although, this requirement disappeared when the principle of the hereditary monarchy came in 1688. Afterwards, kings were required to issue a formal declaration (credentionales litterae) in which they swore to respecting the constitution of the kingdom.

The first requirement (coronation by the Archbishop of Esztergom) was confirmed by Béla III of Hungary, who had been crowned by the Archbishop of Kalocsa, based on the special authorisation of Pope Alexander III. However, after his coronation, he declared that his coronation would not harm the customary claim of the Archbishops of Esztergom to crown the kings. In 1211, Pope Innocent III refused to confirm the agreement of Archbishop John of Esztergom and Archbishop Berthold of Kalocsa, on the transfer of the claim. The Pope declared that the Archbishop of Esztergom alone, and no other prelate, was entitled to crown the King of Hungary.

== Ceremony ==
The Hungarian coronation ritual closely follows the Roman ritual for the consecration and coronation of kings (De Benedictione et Coronatione Regis) found in the Roman Pontifical (Pontificale Romanum). In fact, for the coronation of King Franz Joseph I and Queen Elisabeth, the Roman Pontifical of Clement VII, revised by Benedict XIV, was used rather than the traditional Hungarian ritual.

According to ancient custom just before the coronation proper, the Archbishop of Esztergom handed the Holy Crown to the Count Palatine (Nádor) who lifted it up and showed it to the people and asked if they accept the elect as their king (this is part of the Coronational Ordo of Mainz, which historians like György Györffy theorized that could be the one used). The people responded, "Agreed, so be it, long live the king!" A bishop then presented the king to the Archbishop requesting him in the name of the Church to proceed with his coronation. The Archbishop asked the king three questions—if the king agreed to protect the holy faith, if he agreed to protect the holy Church and if he agreed to protect the kingdom—to each of which the king responded, "I will."

The king then took the oath, "I, nodding to God, confess myself to be King (N) and I promise before God and his Angels henceforth the law, justice, and peace of the Church of God, and the people subject to me to be able and to know, to do and to keep, safe and worthy of the mercy of God, as in the counsel of the faithful I will be able to find better ones. To the pontiffs of the Churches of God, to present a congenial and canonical honor; and to observe inviolably those which have been conferred and returned to the Churches by Emperors and Kings. To render due honor to my abbots, counts, and vassals, according to the counsel of my faithful."

Then he touches with both hands the book of the Gospels, which the Metropolitan holds open before him, saying: So God help me, and these holy Gospels of God.

Afterwards the King-elect reverently kisses the hand of the Metropolitan.

The Archbishop then said the prayer:

Almighty and everlasting God, Creator of all things, Commander of angels, King of kings and Lord of lords, who caused your faithful servant Abraham to triumph over his enemies, gave many victories to Moses and Joshua, the leaders of your people, exalted your humble servant David to the eminence of kingship, enriched Solomon with the ineffable gifts of wisdom and peace. Hear our humble prayers and multiply your blessings upon your servant, whom in prayerful devotion we consecrate our king; that he, being strengthened with the faith of Abraham, endowed with the meekness of Moses, armed with the courage of Joshua, exalted with the humility of David and distinguished with the wisdom of Solomon, may please you in all things and always walk without offense in the way of justice. May he nourish and teach, defend and instruct your Church and people and as a powerful king administer a vigorous regimen against all visible and invisible powers and, with your aid, restore their souls to the concord of true faith and peace; that, supported by the ready obedience and glorified by the due love of these, his people, he may by your mercy ascend to the position of his forefathers and, defended by the helmet of your protection, covered with your invincible shield and completely clothed with heavenly armour, he may in total victoriously triumph and by his [power] intimidate the unfaithful and bring peace to those who fight for you, through our Lord, who by the vigor of his Cross has destroyed Hell, overcame the Devil, ascended into heaven, in whom subsists all power, kingship and victory, who is the glory of the humble and the life and salvation of his people, he who lives and reigns with you and the Holy Spirit forever and ever. Amen.

The king then prostrated himself before the altar as the Litany of the Saints was sung. After this the Archbishop anointed the king on his right forearm and between his shoulders as he said the prayer:

God, the Son of God, Our Lord Jesus Christ, who by the Father was anointed with the oil of gladness above his fellows may He himself by this present infusion of holy anointing pour upon your head the blessing of the Spirit Paraclete to penetrate into the innermost of your heart so that you receive by this visible and material oil invisible gifts and finally having performed the just government of this temporal kingdom, you may merit to reign eternally with Him who alone is the sinless King of Kings, who lives and is glorified with the God the Father in the unity of God the Holy Spirit, for ever and ever. Amen

Then the Mass for the day was begun with the Archbishop saying after the Collect for the day, the additional prayer, "God who reigns over all," etc. After the Gradual and Alleluia, the king was invested with the Hungarian regalia. The king was first invested and girded with the Sword of St. Stephen with the formula:

Accept this sword through the hands of bishops, who unworthy, yet consecrated by the authority of the holy apostles, impart it to you by divine ordinance for the defence of the faith of the holy Church and remember the words of the psalmist, who prophesied, saying, "Gird yourself with your sword upon your thigh, O most mighty one, that by it you may exercise equity, powerfully destroying the growth of iniquity and protect the holy Church of God and his faithful people. Pursue false Christians, no less than the unfaithful, help and defend widows and orphans, restore those things which have fallen into decay and maintain those things thus restored, avenge injustice and confirm good dispositions, that doing this, you may be glorious in the triumph of justice and may reign forever with the Savior of the world, whose image you bear, who with the Father and the Holy Spirit, lives and reigns, forever and ever. Amen.

The king then brandished the sword three times.

Then the Holy Crown is placed upon him, which all the Prelates who are present, being ready, hold in their hands, taken from the altar by the Metropolitan, the Metropolitan himself directing it, placing it on his head, and saying: “Receive the crown of the kingdom, which, though by the unworthy, is nevertheless placed on your head by the hands of the bishops. In the name of the +Father, and of the +Son, and of the +Holy Spirit, you understand to signify the glory of holiness, and honor, and the work of courage, and through this you are not ignorant of our ministry. So that, just as we inwardly are understood to be shepherds and rulers of souls, so you also outwardly worship God, and actively defend against all adversities the Church of Christ, and the kingdom given to you by God, and through the office of our blessing in the place of the Apostles and of all the Saints, in your government may you always appear as a useful executor of the commission, and a profitable ruler; that among the glorious athletes, adorned with the jewels of virtue, and crowned with the prize of eternal happiness, with our Redeemer and Savior Jesus Christ, whose name and virtue you believe to bear, you may be glorified without end. God lives and rules with the Father and the Holy Spirit forever and ever. R. Amen.” This is the same formula for the Crown as that found in the Roman Pontifical of Clement VII.

Next, the king was given the Scepter with the formula:

Accept the Rod of virtue and equity. Learn to respect the pious and to intimidate the proud; guide the straying; lend a hand to the fallen; repress the proud and raise the humble, that our Lord Jesus Christ may open to you the door, he who said of himself, "I am the Door, whoever enters by me, by me shall be saved," and let he who is the Key of David and the Scepter of the House of Israel, be your helper, he who opens and no one may shut, who shuts and no one may open; who brings the captive out of prison, where he sits in darkness and the shadow of death, that in all things you may imitate him, of whom the Prophet David said, "Your seat, O God, endures forever; a rod of righteousness is the rod of your kingdom. You justice and hate iniquity, therefore, God, your God, has anointed you with the oil of gladness above your fellows," Jesus Christ, our Lord.

Then, the Orb was placed into his left hand without any formula, and the king was enthroned with the formula:

Be steadfast and hold fast to that place of which you have become heir by succession from your forefathers, now delegated to you by the authority of Almighty God and transmitted to you by us and all the bishops and servants of God and when you see the clergy draw near to the holy altar, remember to give them appropriate honor that the Mediator between God and humanity may confirm you in this royal position as the mediator between clergy and laity and that you may be able to reign with Jesus Christ, our Lord, the King of kings and Lord of lords, who with the Father and the Holy Spirit lives and reigns forever and ever. Amen.

According to some accounts the Te Deum was then sung followed by the responsory:

Let your hand be strengthened and your right hand be exalted. Let justice and judgment be the foundations of your throne and mercy and truth go before your face. Alleluia. Ps. Have mercy on me,... Glory to the Father and to the Son and to the Holy Spirit. Let your hand be strengthened,...

The Archbishop then said either the prayer, "God who made Moses victorious" or the prayer "Inerrant God." The people then greeted the king with the words, "Life, health, happiness, victory!" after which the Mass was resumed to its conclusion.

The most impressive part was when the sovereign in full regalia rode on horseback up an artificial hill constructed out of soil from all parts of the kingdom. On top of the hill, the sovereign would point to all four corners with the royal sword and swear to protect the kingdom and all its subjects. After that, the nobles and the subjects would hail their new sovereigns with cries of 'hurray' three times and paying homage.

After the ceremony, the royal couple would proceed with great fanfare to the royal castle to receive the homage.

== Coronation dates 1000–1916 ==
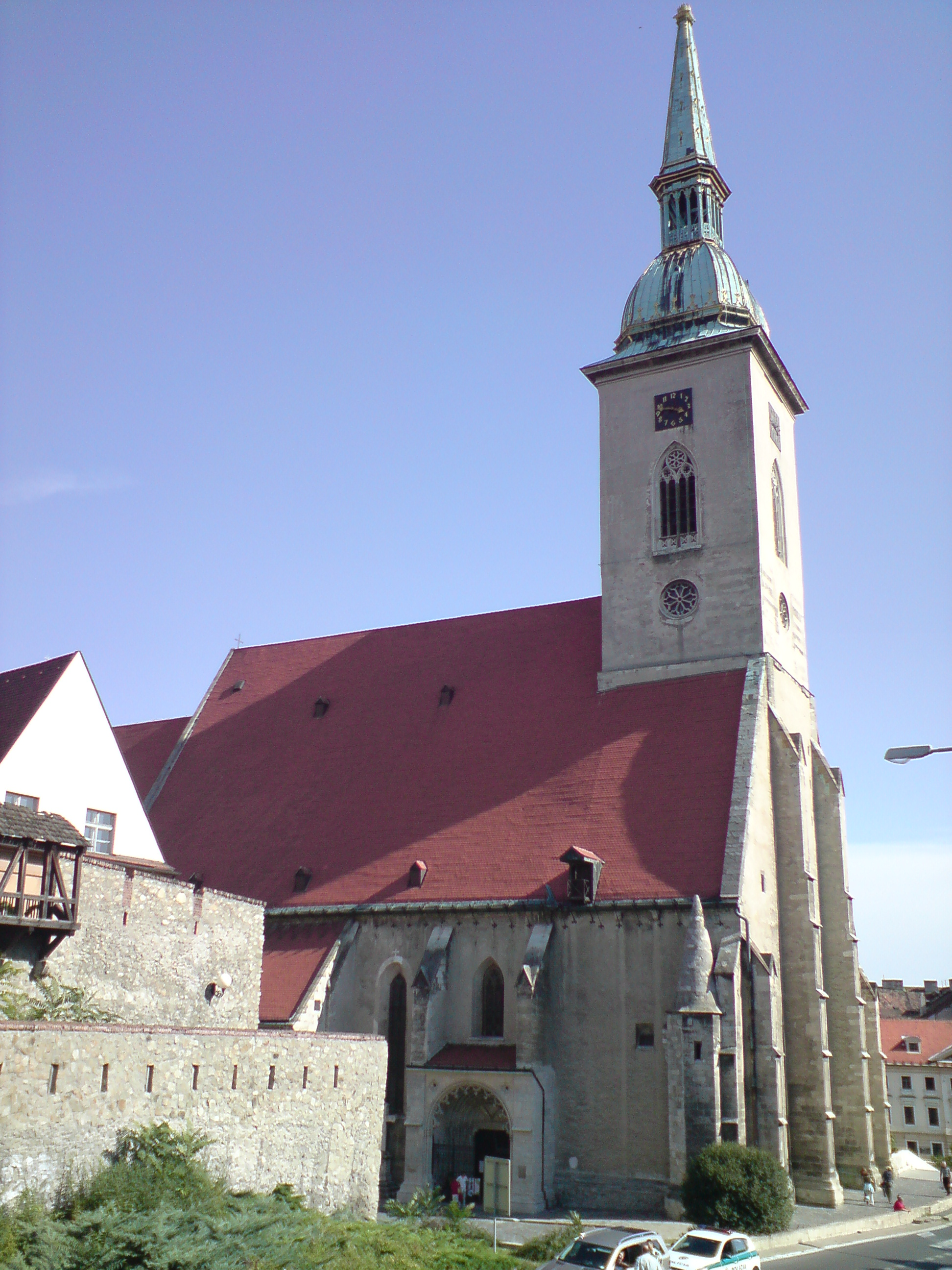
St. Martin's Cathedral in Bratislava, site of Hungarian coronations between 1563 and 1830

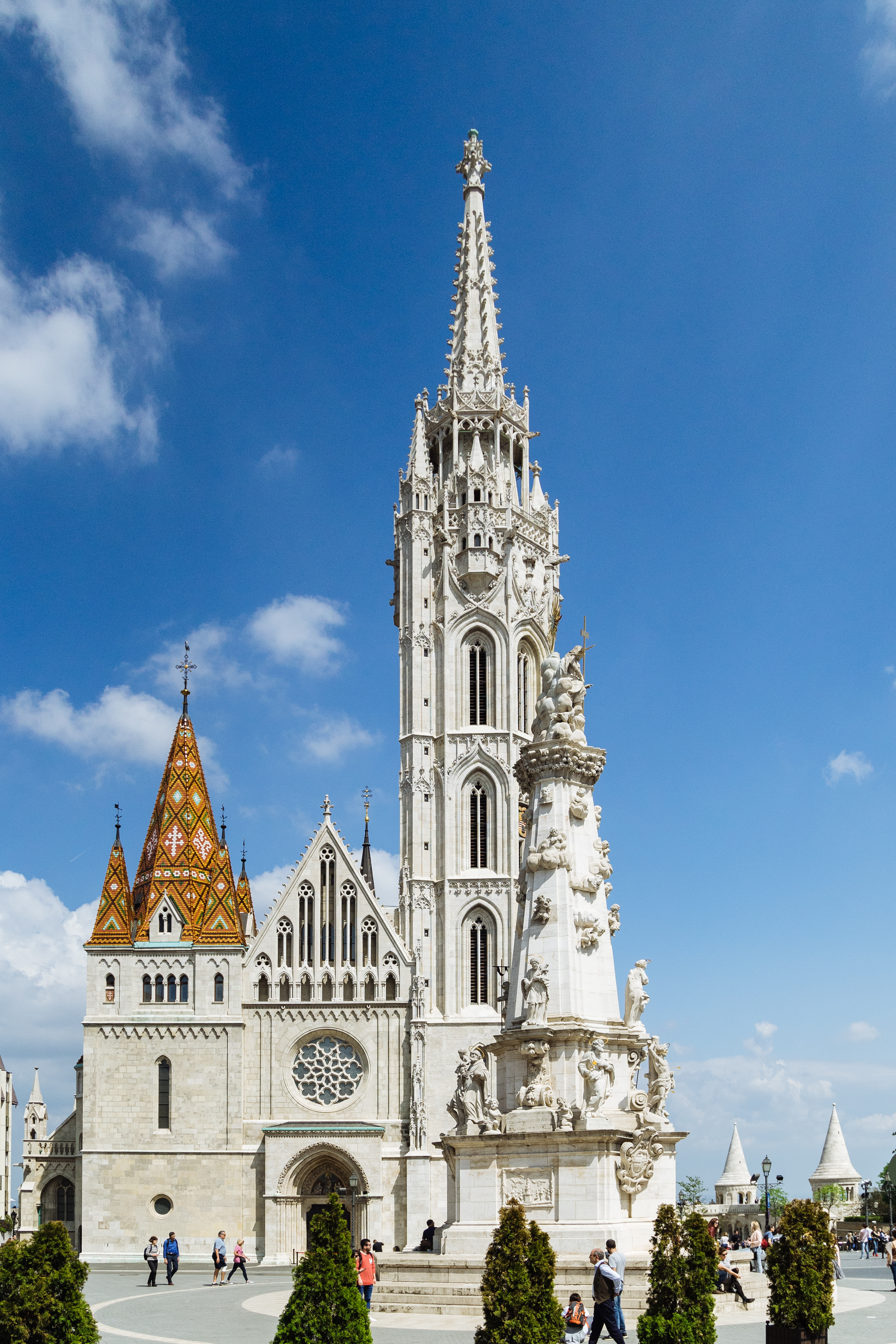
Matthias Church in Budapest, site of the last two Hungarian coronations in 1867 and 1916

=== Basilica in Székesfehérvár 1000-1543 ===
Status	Name	Date	Place	Consecrator
King	Stephen I	25 December 1000 or 1 January 1001	Székesfehérvár Basilica or Esztergom Basilica	Archbishop of Esztergom
King	Peter	1038	Székesfehérvár Basilica	Domonkos Archbishop of Esztergom
King	Samuel	22 April 1041	Csanád	Archbishop of Esztergom
King	Andrew I	September 1046	Székesfehérvár Basilica	Benedict; Archbishop of Esztergom
King	Béla I	6 December 1060	Székesfehérvár Basilica	Archbishop of Esztergom
King	Solomon	1057; 11 April 1064	Pécs; Székesfehérvár Basilica	Archbishop of Esztergom
King	Géza I	1075	Székesfehérvár Basilica	Nehemiah; Archbishop of Esztergom
King	Ladislaus I	1077	Székesfehérvár Basilica	Nehemiah (?); Archbishop of Esztergom
King	Coloman	1096	Székesfehérvár Basilica	Seraphin; Archbishop of Esztergom
King	Stephen II	1116	Székesfehérvár Basilica	Lawrence; Archbishop of Esztergom
King	Béla II	28 April 1131	Székesfehérvár Basilica	Felician; Archbishop of Esztergom
King	Géza II	16 February 1141	Székesfehérvár Basilica	Felician or Macarius (?); Archbishop of Esztergom
King	Stephen III	June 1162	Székesfehérvár Basilica	Lucas; Archbishop of Esztergom
Anti-king	Ladislaus II	July 1162	Székesfehérvár Basilica	Mikó; Archbishop of Kalocsa
Anti-king	Stephen IV	27 January 1163	Székesfehérvár Basilica	Mikó; Archbishop of Kalocsa
King	Béla III	13 January 1173	Székesfehérvár Basilica	Csáma (?); Archbishop of Kalocsa
King	Emeric	16 May 1182	Székesfehérvár Basilica	Nicholas; Archbishop of Esztergom
King	Ladislaus III	26 August 1204	Székesfehérvár Basilica	John; Archbishop of Kalocsa
King	Andrew II	29 May 1205	Székesfehérvár Basilica	John; Archbishop of Kalocsa
King	Béla IV	25 September 1235	Székesfehérvár Basilica	Robert; Archbishop of Esztergom
King	Stephen V	before 1246; 13 May 1270	Székesfehérvár Basilica	Philip Türje; Archbishop of Esztergom (1270)
King	Ladislaus IV	3 September 1272	Székesfehérvár Basilica	Philip Türje; Archbishop of Esztergom
King	Andrew III	23 July 1290	Székesfehérvár Basilica	Lodomer; Archbishop of Esztergom
King	Wenceslaus	27 August 1301	Székesfehérvár Basilica	John Hont-Pázmány; Archbishop of Kalocsa
King	Otto	6 December 1305	Székesfehérvár Basilica	Benedict Rád; Bishop of Veszprém; Anthony; Bishop of Csanád
King	Charles I	early 1301; 15/16 June 1309; 27 August 1310	Esztergom; Buda; Székesfehérvár Basilica	Gregory Bicskei; Archbishop-elect of Esztergom (1301); Thomas; Archbishop of Esztergom (1309 and 1310)
King	Louis I	21 July 1342	Székesfehérvár Basilica	Csanád Telegdi; Archbishop of Esztergom
Queen	Mary I	17 September 1382	Székesfehérvár Basilica	Demetrius; Archbishop of Esztergom
King	Charles II	31 December 1385	Székesfehérvár Basilica	Demetrius; Archbishop of Esztergom
King	Sigismund	31 March 1387	Székesfehérvár Basilica	Benedict Himfi; Bishop of Veszprém
Anti-king	Ladislaus of Naples	5 August 1403	Church of Saint Chrysogonus, Zadar	János Kanizsai; Archbishop of Esztergom
Queen	Barbara of Cilli	6 December 1405	Székesfehérvár Basilica	György; Bishop of Veszprém
King	Albert	1 January 1438	Székesfehérvár Basilica	George Pálóci; Archbishop of Esztergom
Queen	Elizabeth of Luxembourg	1 January 1438	Székesfehérvár Basilica	Simon Rozgonyi; Bishop of Veszprém
King	Ladislaus V	15 May 1440	Székesfehérvár Basilica	Dénes Szécsi; Archbishop of Esztergom
King	Vladislaus I	17 July 1440	Székesfehérvár Basilica	Dénes Szécsi; Archbishop of Esztergom
King	Matthias I	29 March 1464	Székesfehérvár Basilica	Dénes Szécsi; Archbishop of Esztergom
Queen	Beatrice of Naples	12 December 1476	Székesfehérvár Basilica	Albert Vetési; Bishop of Veszprém
King	Vladislaus II	18 September 1490	Székesfehérvár Basilica	Osvald Thuz; Bishop of Zagreb
Queen	Anne of Foix-Candale	29 September 1502	Székesfehérvár Basilica	Tamás Bakócz; Archbishop of Esztergom
King	Louis II	4 June 1508	Székesfehérvár Basilica	Tamás Bakócz; Archbishop of Esztergom
Queen	Mary of Austria	11 December 1521	Székesfehérvár Basilica	Simon Erdődi; Bishop of Zagreb
King	John I	11 November 1526	Székesfehérvár Basilica	István Podmaniczky; Bishop of Nitra
King	Ferdinand I	3 November 1527	Székesfehérvár Basilica	István Podmaniczky; Bishop of Nitra
Queen	Anna	4 November 1527	Székesfehérvár Basilica	István Podmaniczky; Bishop of Nitra
Queen	Isabella Jagiellon	2 March 1539	Székesfehérvár Basilica	Pál Várdai; Archbishop of Esztergom, primate of Hungary

=== In Posonium/Bratislava, Sopron and Buda(pest) 1543-1916 ===
Status	Name	Date	Place	Consecrator
King	Maximilian	8 September 1563	St Martin's Cathedral, Posonium	Nicolaus Olahus; Archbishop of Esztergom, primate of Hungary
Queen	Maria of Spain	9 September 1563	St Martin's Cathedral, Posonium	András Köves; Bishop of Veszprém
King	Rudolf	25 September 1572	St Martin's Cathedral, Posonium	Antun Vrančić; Archbishop of Esztergom, primate of Hungary
King	Matthias II	19 November 1608	St Martin's Cathedral, Posonium	Ferenc Forgách; Archbishop of Esztergom, primate of Hungary
Queen	Anna of Tyrol	25 March 1613	St Martin's Cathedral, Posonium	Ferenc Erghely; Bishop of Veszprém
King	Ferdinand II	1 July 1618	St Martin's Cathedral, Posonium	Péter Pázmány; Archbishop of Esztergom, primate of Hungary
Queen	Eleanor Gonzaga	26 July 1622	Church of the Assumption, Sopron	Ferenc Erghely; Bishop of Veszprém
King	Ferdinand III	8 December 1625	Church of the Assumption, Sopron	Péter Pázmány; Archbishop of Esztergom, primate of Hungary
Queen	Maria Anna of Spain	14 February 1638	St Martin's Cathedral, Posonium	George Orlovai-Jakusyth; Bishop of Veszprém
King	Ferdinand IV	16 June 1647	St Martin's Cathedral, Posonium	György Lippay; Archbishop of Esztergom, primate of Hungary
Queen	Eleanor Gonzaga	6 June 1655	St Martin's Cathedral, Posonium	George Széchenyi; Bishop of Veszprém
King	Leopold I	27 June 1655	St Martin's Cathedral, Posonium	George Lippay; Archbishop of Esztergom, primate of Hungary
Queen	Eleonore Magdalene	9 November 1681	Church of the Assumption, Sopron	Stephen Sennyey; Bishop of Veszprém
King	Joseph I	9 December 1687	St Martin's Cathedral, Posonium	George Széchenyi; Archbishop of Esztergom, primate of Hungary
King	Charles III	22 May 1712	St Martin's Cathedral, Posonium	Christian August of Saxe-Zeitz; Archbishop of Esztergom, primate of Hungary
Queen	Elisabeth Christine	18 October 1714	St Martin's Cathedral, Posonium	Otto Jochannes Volkra; Bishop of Veszprém
Queen	Maria II Theresa	25 June 1741	St Martin's Cathedral, Posonium	Imre Esterházy; Archbishop of Esztergom, primate of Hungary
King	Leopold II	15 November 1790	St Martin's Cathedral, Posonium	József Batthyány; Archbishop of Esztergom, primate of Hungary
King	Francis I	6 June 1792	St. Stephen's Church, Buda	József Batthyány; Archbishop of Esztergom, primate of Hungary
Queen	Maria Theresa	10 June 1792	St. Stephen's Church, Buda	John Bajzáth; Bishop of Veszprém
Queen	Maria Ludovika	7 September 1808	St Martin's Cathedral, Posonium	Paul Rosos; Bishop of Veszprém
Queen	Caroline Augusta	25 September 1825	St Martin's Cathedral, Posonium	John Kopácsy; Bishop of Veszprém
King	Ferdinand V	28 September 1830	St Martin's Cathedral, Posonium	Alexander Rudnay; Archbishop of Esztergom, primate of Hungary
King	Franz Joseph I	8 June 1867	Matthias Church, Buda	János Simor; Archbishop of Esztergom, primate of Hungary
Queen	Elisabeth in Bavaria	8 June 1867	Matthias Church, Buda	John Ranolder; Bishop of Veszprém
King	Charles IV	30 December 1916	Matthias Church, Budapest	János Csernoch; Archbishop of Esztergom, primate of Hungary
Queen	Zita of Bourbon-Parma	30 December 1916	Matthias Church, Budapest	Károly Hornig; Bishop of Veszprém
