= Fancica =

Hungarian prelate

- Archbishop of Kalocsa
- Appointed: 1131
- Term ended: 1134 or later
- Predecessor: Gregory
- Successor: Simon
- Other post: Bishop of Zagreb

Personal details
- Died: after 1134
- Denomination: Roman Catholicism

Fancica or Francica (Hungarian: Fancsika, Croatian: Francika; died after 1134) was a Hungarian prelate at the turn of the 11th and 12th centuries, who served as Bishop of Zagreb from around 1125 to 1131, then Archbishop of Kalocsa from 1131 until his death.

== Name ==
His name is preserved by contemporary records in various forms, for instance, Fancica, Fantica or Francika. 18th-century Hungarian Jesuit scholar István Katona identified these variants as equivalents to Francis, although it derived from the given name of St. Francis of Assisi, who lived a century later. Despite this, Croatian historiography accepted this argumentation, while Hungarian academics translated his name to "Fancsika" or "Fáncsika". In the 11th-century Hungary, there was a local man named Fancica, originating from Szamosújvár (present-day Gherla, Romania), who guided the Hungarian royal army against the invading Oghuzes in 1068, which led to the victorious Battle of Kerlés.

== Ecclesiastical career ==
Fancica started his ecclesiastical career as one of the influential royal chaplains of Ladislaus I of Hungary. In this capacity, he played an important role in the foundation of the Diocese of Zagreb, when he was sent to inaugurate and consecrate its first bishop, Duh around 1090 (there is a scholarly debate about the exact date of the diocese's establishment). In the same time, another royal chaplain Cupan (or Koppány) was commissioned to donate the village of Dubrava (Dombró) with its people, lands and forests to the newly erected diocese. Fancica was among those royal chaplains of Ladislaus, along with Seraphin, Lawrence and Cupan, who later emerged into bishopric positions during the reigns of Ladislaus' successors.

By the reign of Stephen II of Hungary, at least from around 1125–28, Fancica was made Bishop of Zagreb. According to Croatian historian Ivan Tkalčić, he already held dignity since 1114 or 1115 (his last known predecessor, Manasses was mentioned as bishop of "Zagorje" [i.e. plausibly Zagreb] by the two royal charters of King Coloman regarding the Zobor Abbey, issued in 1111 and 1113). During the episcopate of Fancica, a certain nobleman Sungenga (Szundenya) questioned the rightful ownership of the Diocese of Zagreb over the forest of Dubrava, as a result the bishop petitioned to the royal court of Stephen II. The king entrusted Felician, Archbishop of Esztergom to investigate the lawsuit. According to historian László Koszta, it proves that the Diocese of Zagreb was one of the suffragans of the Archdiocese of Esztergom during that time (while, later, it belonged to the Archdiocese of Kalocsa by mid-12th century).

Fancica was transferred to the Archbishopric of Kalocsa in 1131. He was referred to as "archbishop of Bács" (Hungarian: Baaciensis archiepiscopus) in the sole document, which mentioned him in this capacity. During the reign of Béla II of Hungary, the rightful ownership of Zagreb over the estate Dubrava was again contested. Therefore, Archbishop Felician, who summoned a provincial synod to the Cathedral Basilica of Várad (today Oradea, Romania) in 1134, again judged over the lawsuit in favor of the Diocese of Zagreb. Fancica also attended the event and appeared in the verdict as a testimony. Felician's judgement definitely says that Fancica was succeeded as Bishop of Zagreb by Macilinus – now a defendant at the trial – in the year 1131. Fancica died sometime after 1134. A falsified charter dated to 1135 lists one Archbishop Simon of Kalocsa. Taking into account that the document was based on a charter issued in the reign of King Béla II, it is plausible that Simon was elevated to the rank of archbishop in the second half of the 1130s.

== Sources ==
- Dobronić, Lelja (1995). "Francika [Francis]". In Franko, Mirošević (ed.). Zagrebački biskupi i nadbiskupi [Bishops and Archbishops of Zagreb] (in Croatian). Školska knjiga. pp. 9–10. ISBN 953-0-60597-8.
- Koszta, László (2013). A kalocsai érseki tartomány kialakulása [The Development of the Archdiocese of Kalocsa] (in Hungarian). Pécsi Történettudományért Kulturális Egyesület. ISBN 978-963-89482-2-9.
- Udvardy, József (1991). A kalocsai érsekek életrajza (1000–1526) [Biographies of Archbishops of Kalocsa, 1000–1526] (in Hungarian). Görres Gesellschaft.
- Zsoldos, Attila (2011). Magyarország világi archontológiája, 1000–1301 [Secular Archontology of Hungary, 1000–1301] (in Hungarian). História, MTA Történettudományi Intézete. ISBN 978-963-9627-38-3.

Catholic Church titles
| Preceded by Manasses | Bishop of Zagreb c. 1125/28–1131 | Succeeded by Macilinus |
| Preceded by Gregory | Archbishop of Kalocsa; 1131–1134 | Succeeded by Simon |
