= Marcellus (archbishop of Esztergom) =

Hungarian prelate

- Archbishop of Esztergom
- See: Esztergom
- Appointed: c. 1116
- Term ended: c. 1124
- Predecessor: Lawrence
- Successor: Felician
- Other post: Bishop of Vác

Personal details
- Died: after 1124

Marcellus (Hungarian: Marcell; died after 1124) was a Hungarian prelate at the turn of the 11th and 12th centuries, who served as Bishop of Vác from around 1111 to 1113, then Archbishop of Esztergom from around 1116 until his death.

== Career ==
In his youth, Marcellus belonged to the court clergy and was probably a member of the royal chapel during the reign of Ladislaus I of Hungary. He was also a provost of Székesfehérvár, Óbuda or Titel. According to the Illuminated Chronicle, Ladislaus, who laid on his deathbed, sent Palatine Peter and Marcellus to Poland to negotiate the duke's deputy Sieciech in the summer of 1095. The Hungarian delegation invited the king's exiled nephew Coloman back from Poland to become his heir. Another chapter of the chronicle styles Marcellus as "sanctus", which referred to his pious nature and exemplary saintly way of life despite his young age, as medievalist László Koszta argued.

After the coronation of Coloman in 1096, he became an important confidant of the new monarch. Sometimes at the turn of the 11th and 12th centuries, he was made Bishop of Vác. It is plausible he is identical with that prelate, who was mentioned without his see in 1103. The first known holder of the title, he was mentioned in that capacity by the two establishing charters of the Zobor Abbey, issued in 1111 and 1113. The cathedral of Vác was built by Coloman's father Géza I, where he was buried too, which fact confirms the strong alliance between the king and Marcellus. In the two Zobor Documents, Marcellus appeared in seventh and eighth places at the list of prelates (which reflects hierarchy among them), respectively. He participated in the first and second synods at Esztergom. Alongside six bishops and several secular barons, Marcellus escorted Coloman to Dalmatia in 1111, who confirmed the privileges of Split, Trogir, and Zadar. The event was narrated by a royal charter from 1118, which ranks Marcellus to the second place among the prelates. Koszta considered it reflects to the situation when the charter was written, thus Marcellus already functioned as Archbishop of Esztergom in 1118 (his predecessor Lawrence died approximately two years ago). Nevertheless, Marcellus first and only appeared in that dignity in July 1124.

Marcellus was present at the burial of Coloman in Székesfehérvár and the coronation of Stephen II in 1116. He was the first known Archbishop of Esztergom, who was transferred from another diocese. In July 1124, he belonged to the companion of Stephen II, who visited Dalmatia to confirm his father's former grants and privileges to the coastal cities. It confirms that Marcellus had also participated in the royal campaign against the province, taking advantage of the temporary absence of the Venetian fleet from the Adriatic Sea. In the same year, Marcellus was also mentioned by a non-authentic charter on the occasion of a lawsuit between Othmar, ispán of Bars County and Henry, abbot of Garamszentbenedek (today Hronský Beňadik, Slovakia), when Marcellus and other bishops appeared as investigators and judges. Still in 1124, Marcellus met papal legate Giles, who travelled to Germany through Hungary. As his successor Felician was referred to as archbishop by a charter dated between around the years 1125 and 1128, Marcellus possibly died not long after his last appearance in contemporary documents.

== Sources ==
- Galla, Ferenc (1970). "A váci egyházmegye püspökei [The Bishops of the Diocese of Vác]". In Bánk, József (ed.). Váci egyházmegyei almanach Szent István millénium évében (in Hungarian). Roman Catholic Diocese of Vác. pp. 103–201.
- Koszta, László (2003). "Marcell [Marcellus]". In Beke, Margit (ed.). Esztergomi érsekek 1001–2003 [Archbishops of Esztergom 1001–2003] (in Hungarian). Szent István Társulat. pp. 43–45. ISBN 963-361-472-4.
- Zsoldos, Attila (2011). Magyarország világi archontológiája, 1000–1301 [Secular Archontology of Hungary, 1000–1301] (in Hungarian). História, MTA Történettudományi Intézete. ISBN 978-963-9627-38-3.

Catholic Church titles
Preceded by first known	Bishop of Vác; 1111–1113	Succeeded by Marcellinus (?)
Preceded by Lawrence	Archbishop of Esztergom c. 1116–1124	Succeeded by Felician
