= Desiderius (archbishop of Kalocsa) =

Hungarian prelate

- Archbishop of Kalocsa
- Appointed: b. 1064
- Term ended: 1076/90
- Predecessor: George
- Successor: Fabian

Personal details
- Denomination: Roman Catholicism

Desiderius or Ders (Hungarian: Dezső) was a Hungarian prelate in the 11th century, who served as Archbishop of Kalocsa from around 1064 to 1076 (or 1090).

== Life ==
Some 19th-century historiographical works – including Nándor Knauz's Monumenta ecclesiae Strigoniensis – incorrectly referred to him as archbishop of Esztergom. Chronologically, Desiderius is first mentioned by the 14th-century Illuminated Chronicle. According to its narration, "bishop Desiderius" (without mentioning his specific see) mediated the peace negotiations, when Solomon, King of Hungary and his rebellious cousins, dukes Géza, Ladislaus and Lampert reached an agreement, which was signed in Győr on 20 January 1064. Despite his being styled as bishop by the chronicle, the majority of the historians consider he already served as archbishop of Kalocsa by then, as the transfer of bishops from one diocese to another was a forbidden procedure in the 11th century.

He is identical with that "archbishop Ders" whose name is mentioned by the founding charter of the Abbey of Százd (laid near present-day Tiszakeszi) around 1067 (in medieval Hungary, the given name Ders was the Hungarian name variation of Desiderius). When comes Peter Aba, founder of the monastery, requested exemption from the tax payments (tithe), both King Solomon and Desiderius approved it (despite the fact that the abbey laid in the territory of the Diocese of Eger, a subordinate to Esztergom).

Desiderius is next referred to as archbishop in the founding charter of the Benedictine Abbey of Garamszentbenedek (today Hronský Beňadik, Slovakia) in 1075, alongside Nehemiah, Archbishop of Esztergom. The Illuminated Chronicle refers to him simply as archbishop Desiderius, and narrates that King Géza celebrated Christmas at Szekszárd Abbey in 1076. Accordingly, the "King prostrated himself with tears before the Archbishop [Desiderius] and the other ecclesiastical personages and prelates. He said that he had sinned because he had possessed himself of the kingdom of a lawfully crowned king". Based on this chapter, Nándor Knauz considered that Desiderius was a different prelate and he could be only archbishop of Esztergom, as there were no known "archbishops" of Kalocsa when he wrote his monograph about the history of the Archdiocese of Esztergom. However it is known that Nehemiah held that dignity from around 1075 to at least 1077.

Historian László Koszta argued the above-mentioned chapters of the Illuminated Chronicle were written during the reign of Coloman, King of Hungary. Around that time Lawrence functioned as archbishop of Esztergom. Since his episcopate, tensions appear to have emerged between the sees Esztergom and Kalocsa, which affected the contemporary chronicles too. For instance, that rivalry also appeared in the coeval Life of King Stephen of Hungary, compiled by Hartvik, Bishop of Győr (thus a subordinate to Lawrence), when it derived the title of the superior of Kalocsa from Esztergom, emphasizing its subsidiarity. Lawrence refused to recognize the Archdiocese of Kalocsa as an equal see in the ecclesiastical hierarchy.

According to a non-authentic charter of 1093, Desiderius, "bishop" of Kalocsa, was involved in a border dispute with Stephen, Bishop of Pécs. In this year, according to the charter, King Ladislaus I, along with prelates of the kingdom, determined the borders between the Archdiocese of Kalocsa and the Diocese of Pécs. The charter also relates that the monarch took into account both the testimony of Desiderius and the deed of foundation of the bishopric of Pécs (dated 1009). The forgery was compiled, among others, by the usage of an authentic document from 1090. It is presumable that Desiderius still held the dignity during that time.

== Sources ==
- Koszta, László (2013). A kalocsai érseki tartomány kialakulása [The Development of the Archdiocese of Kalocsa] (in Hungarian). Pécsi Történettudományért Kulturális Egyesület. ISBN 978-963-89482-2-9.
- Udvardy, József (1991). A kalocsai érsekek életrajza (1000–1526) [Biographies of Archbishops of Kalocsa, 1000–1526] (in Hungarian). Görres Gesellschaft.
- Zsoldos, Attila (2011). Magyarország világi archontológiája, 1000–1301 [Secular Archontology of Hungary, 1000–1301] (in Hungarian). História, MTA Történettudományi Intézete. ISBN 978-963-9627-38-3.

Religious titles
Preceded by George	Archbishop of Kalocsa b. 1064–1076/90	Succeeded by Fabian
