= Paul I (archbishop of Kalocsa) =

Hungarian bishop

Paul
- Archbishop of Kalocsa
- Installed: before 1111
- Term ended: after 1113
- Predecessor: Ugolin
- Successor: Fulbert

Personal details
- Died: after 1113
- Denomination: Roman Catholic

Paul (Hungarian: Pál; died after 1113) was a Hungarian prelate in the twelfth century, who served as Archbishop of Kalocsa between around 1111 and 1113.

== Archbishop ==
Paul was styled as "Bishop of Kalocsa" (Latin: episcopus [...] Colocensis) by two royal charters of Coloman, King of Hungary issued regarding the Zobor Abbey in 1111 and 1113. His title reflects the claim of Archdiocese of Esztergom for exclusive supremacy within the Hungarian ecclesiastical hierarchy, which emerged during the governance of Lawrence of Esztergom, who refused to recognize the Archdiocese of Kalocsa as an equal see with Esztergom. A non-authentic charter, allegedly issued in 1111, also claims that the see of Kalocsa was one of the suffragan bishoprics of the Archdiocese of Esztergom.

Paul attended the Second Synod of Esztergom, which most probably took place in March 1112. Paul was succeeded by Fulbert, who first appeared in this capacity in 1118.

== Sources ==
- Koszta, László (2013). A kalocsai érseki tartomány kialakulása [The Development of the Archdiocese of Kalocsa] (in Hungarian). Pécsi Történettudományért Kulturális Egyesület. ISBN 978-963-89482-2-9.
- Udvardy, József (1991). A kalocsai érsekek életrajza (1000–1526) [Biographies of Archbishops of Kalocsa, 1000–1526] (in Hungarian). Görres Gesellschaft.
- Zsoldos, Attila (2011). Magyarország világi archontológiája, 1000–1301 [Secular Archontology of Hungary, 1000–1301] (in Hungarian). História, MTA Történettudományi Intézete. ISBN 978-963-9627-38-3.

Catholic Church titles
Preceded by Ugolin	Archbishop of Kalocsa c. 1111–1113	Succeeded by Fulbert
