= Benedict I =

Benedict I may refer to:

- Benedict I of Jerusalem (1892–1980), Patriarch of Jerusalem of the Greek Orthodox Church
- Benedict I (archbishop of Esztergom) (died 1055)
- Pope Benedict I (died 579), Pope of the Catholic Church
