= Stephen I of Pécs =

Stephen
- Bishop of Pécs (c. 1093)
- Province: Esztergom
- Diocese: Pécs

Personal details
- Denomination: Roman Catholic

Stephen I was the third known bishop of Pécs (Hungarian: I. István pécsi püspök) in the Kingdom of Hungary around 1093. His name was only maintained by a 15th-century copy of an obviously falsified charter dated to 1093. In this year, according to the charter, King Ladislaus I of Hungary, along with the archbishop of Esztergom and other prelates of the kingdom, determined the borders between the Archdiocese of Kalocsa and the Diocese of Pécs. The charter also relates that the monarch took into account both the testimony of Archbishop Desiderius of Kalocsa, and the deed of foundation of the bishopric of Pécs. Although the charter itself is not authentic, it may well have preserved the memory of a bishop of Pécs named Stephen from the end of the 11th century.

Stephen I of Pécs Born: unknown Died: unknown
Catholic Church titles
Preceded by (?) Maurus	Bishop of Pécs c. 1093	Succeeded by (?) Simon
