= Acha (archbishop of Esztergom) =

Hungarian prelate

- Archbishop of Esztergom
- See: Esztergom
- Appointed: c. 1087
- Term ended: c. 1090
- Predecessor: Nehemiah (?)
- Successor: Seraphin

Acha was a Hungarian prelate in the second half of the 11th century, who served as Archbishop of Esztergom from around 1087 to 1090.

== Etymology ==
His name may come from Turkic "aça", meaning "open, clear, clean".

== Career ==
Born into the native nobility, he was of Hungarian origin. As he did not adopt a Christian name, he was not a member of the Benedictine Order, in contrast to most contemporary prelates. It is possible that, as his successors, he was one of the court clergymen during the reign of Ladislaus I of Hungary. A document from 1134, which contains a verdict of Archbishop Felician, narrates the circumstances of the foundation of the Diocese of Zagreb, where Acha was mentioned as Archbishop of Esztergom, thus he held the dignity around then, when Ladislaus set up the episcopate. According to historian László Koszta, it is presumable that Acha already served as archbishop during the canonization of Stephen I in 1083. 17th-century Jesuit scholar Melchior Inchofer argued Ladislaus sent his envoy, Archbishop Acha to Pope Urban II in 1088 in order to prepare his invasion of Croatia and ask the pope's consent. Based on historian Bálint Hóman's research, the Diocese of Zagreb (in Slavonia, which was "no-man's land" between Hungary and Croatia) was founded in the late 1080s, just before Ladislaus' invasion. If the establishment took place after the war, Acha functioned as Archbishop of Esztergom after 1091 (at the latest in 1093 and 1094).

According to a scholarly theory, the sees of the dioceses of Kalocsa and Bihar were moved to Bács (now Bač, Serbia) and Nagyvárad (present-day Oradea, Romania), respectively, during Acha's primacy. It is possible that the erection of the second Gyulafehérvár Cathedral also occurred then, in addition to the foundations of the Kolozsmonostor and Báta abbeys. As he was not present at the establishment of the Somogyvár Abbey in 1091, presumably he was dead by then.

== Sources ==
- Koszta, László (2003). "Acha". In Beke, Margit (ed.). Esztergomi érsekek 1001–2003 [Archbishops of Esztergom 1001–2003] (in Hungarian). Szent István Társulat. pp. 29–31. ISBN 963-361-472-4.
- Zsoldos, Attila (2011). Magyarország világi archontológiája, 1000–1301 [Secular Archontology of Hungary, 1000–1301] (in Hungarian). História, MTA Történettudományi Intézete. ISBN 978-963-9627-38-3.

Catholic Church titles
Preceded by Nehemiah (?)	Archbishop of Esztergom c. 1087–1090	Succeeded by Seraphin
