= Zobor Documents =

Two oldest preserved documents of Slovakia

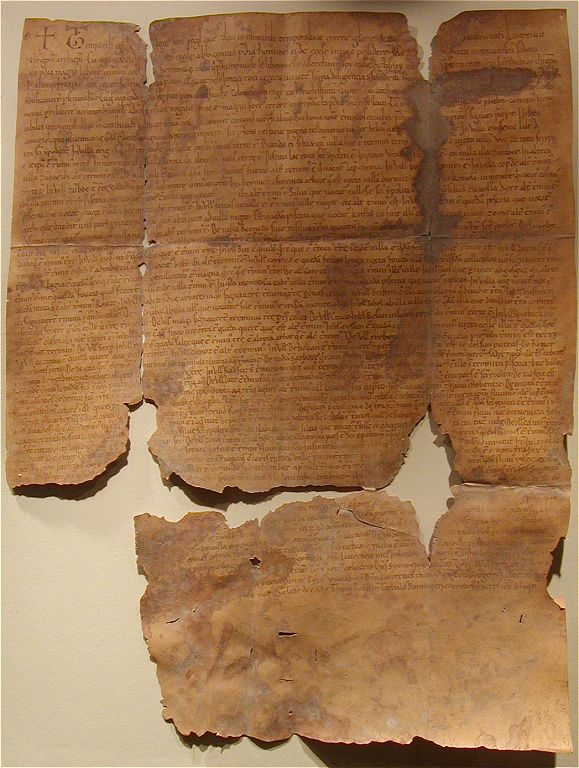
The Zobor documents.

The Zobor Documents (Slovak: Zoborská listina, Hungarian: zobori oklevelek; also known as the Zobor Deeds) are the two oldest preserved original documents from the territory of Slovakia. They were created in 1111 and 1113 by order of Coloman, King of Hungary in the Benedictine Abbey of St. Hyppolite in Zobor near Nitra.

They concerned property matters of the Zobor convent and for many of the villages mentioned in the documents they represent the first written mention. The documents contains the names of over 150 rivers, districts and villages located mainly in the territory of the Nitra region.

It is a part of the Cultural Heritage Monuments of Slovakia.

== Documents ==
=== Zobor charter from 1111 ===
The first charter (issued on September 1, 1111) concerned a dispute over the collection of tolls and tithes between the Zobor Monastery of St. Hippolytus and the royal toll collectors. In this document, King Coloman confirms the right of the Zobor Abbey to the properties of subjects in western and central Slovakia. These properties were received by the Zobor Benedictines from King Stephen I. The charter was probably written by a member of the chapter, the grammarian Willermus, who also taught writing here, which proves that there was already a school in Zobor at that time. It probably followed on from the Great Moravian academy, which was run by Bishop Viching after Methodius' departure.

=== Zobor charter from 1113 ===
The second charter, dated 1113, contains an inventory of the property of the Zobor Abbey. Given that the charter lists over 150 villages and various landmarks in their territories, it is an exceptionally valuable topography of the entire western Slovakia at the beginning of the 12th century. It also testifies to the organization of church life by Benedictine monks. The Benedictine monastery of St. Hippolytus at the foot of Zobor was the oldest in Slovakia and disappeared during the reign of King Matthias Corvinus. Among the names of persons and names of villages listed in the charters, the most are Slovak, then German and Latinized. This proves that even in the 12th century, long after the collapse of Svatopluk's empire, the Nitra lordship was an important center of Slovak ethnogenesis and also testifies to the gradual integration of non-Slavic ethnic groups into the Slavic environment and the administrative and religious-cultural structures created by it. The documents do not mention Hungarian names, which proves that Nitra, as a former central government center, retained its Slovak character in the 12th and probably also in the middle of the 13th century. According to historians, both Zobor documents were written by scribes of the Benedictine abbey in Zobor or in the Nitra chapter. Paleographic analysis indicates that the documents were written by monks from the French-German border. The influence of French and German orthography causes frequent distortion of Slovak names of villages, rivers, mountains and other geographical locations.

The Zobor documents have been preserved in their original form, the first is damaged and the second is relatively preserved on parchment, and are stored in the archives of the Nitra Diocese.

== Legacy ==
In 2011, the National Bank of Slovakia issued a silver collector coin with a nominal value of 10 euros on the occasion of the 900th anniversary of the first Zobor charter. The author of the design is Peter Valach and the coin was minted at the Kremnica mint.

== See also ==
- History of Slovakia
