= Simon of Kalocsa =

Bishop of Pécs and archbishop of Kalocsa

Simon
- Archbishop of Kalocsa and Bács
- Province: Kalocsa-Bács
- Diocese: Kalocsa-Bács
- Appointed: 1133-1135
- Term ended: 1142 or before
- Other post: Bishop of Pécs

Personal details
- Died: 1142 or before
- Denomination: Roman Catholic

Simon was a prelate of foreign origin in the Kingdom of Hungary in the first half of the 12th century. He was bishop of Pécs from around 1108 until 1135 at the latest, and archbishop of Kalocsa and Bács between around 1135 and 1142. His command of Greek is well attested in the sources.

== Life ==
The first record on Simon is connected to the transcription of the deed of foundation of the convent of Greek nuns at Veszprém in 1109. In this year King Coloman of Hungary entrusted Simon to open and read the charter issued in Greek for the nuns most probably in the reign of King Stephen I of Hungary in order to compare the text with the properties the nuns actually possessed in the first decade of the 12th century. Having completed this work, Simon was also appointed to prepare, in collaboration with the bishop of Veszprém, both a copy of the original deed of foundation and its Latin variant reflecting the actual situation. When preparing the Latin version of the charter, Bishop Simon took care of the interests of his own diocese by emphasizing that the village of Magyarsarlós was jointly possessed by the nuns and the bishop of Pécs. Bishop Simon's mastery of Greek and the use of Southern Italian patterns in the Latin variant of the charter point at his Sicilian or South Italian origin. Accordingly, he may well have arrived in the kingdom in the retinue of King Coloman's first wife, Felicia of Sicily in 1097.

It is plausible that he is identical with that certain Bishop Simon, who was one of the two signatories of the Treaty of Devol on the behalf of Coloman in September 1108, alongside ispán Peres. In this case, he already held the dignity of Bishop of Pécs in that year. Simon was one of the bishops to confirm the oath taken in 1111 by King Coloman on the preservation of the liberties of the towns of Dalmatia. Similarly, he was one of the four bishops to sign a charter issued for Trogir and Split in 1124 by King Coloman's successor, King Stephen II. The latter is the last existing authentic charter mentioning one "Bishop Simon of Pécs", but referring to ancient manuscripts József Koller would state in the 18th century that Simon was still at the head of the diocese in 1133. Moreover, a falsified charter dated to 1135 lists one Archbishop Simon of Kalocsa. Taking into account that the latter was based on a charter issued in the reign of King Béla II of Hungary, it is plausible that Simon was elevated to the rank of archbishop following decades of his bishopric in Pécs.

The exact circumstances surrounding the submission of Bosnia are unknown but the region seems to have accepted Béla's suzerainty without resistance by 1137, which coincided with the episcopal activity of Simon. His archdiocese, with the task of Catholic spiritual care over the province, was commissioned to integrate the newly acquired territories to the Hungarian church hierarchy. The remaining part of Simon's potential archiepiscopate is unknown; the next known office-holder Mikó was first referred to in this capacity two decades later, in 1156.

== Sources ==
- Koszta, László (2009). "Simon (1108–1124/1134)". In Tamás Fedeles; Gábor Sarbak; József Sümegi (eds.). A Pécsi Egyházmegye története I: A középkor évszázadai (1009–1543) [A History of the Diocese of Pécs, Volume I: Medieval Centuries, 1009–1543] (in Hungarian). Pécs: Fény Kft. pp. 63–65. ISBN 978-963-88572-0-0.
- Udvardy, József (1991). A kalocsai érsekek életrajza (1000–1526) [Biographies of Archbishops of Kalocsa, 1000–1526] (in Hungarian). Görres Gesellschaft.
- Zsoldos, Attila (2011). Magyarország világi archontológiája, 1000–1301 [Secular Archontology of Hungary, 1000–1301] (in Hungarian). História, MTA Történettudományi Intézete. ISBN 978-963-9627-38-3.

Catholic Church titles
Preceded by (?) Stephen I	Bishop of Pécs c. 1108–b. 1136	Succeeded by (?) Nána
Preceded by Fancica	Archbishop of Kalocsa-Bács b. 1136–b. 1143	Succeeded by (?) Mikó
