= Nehemiah (archbishop of Esztergom) =

Hungarian prelate and politician

- Archbishop of Esztergom
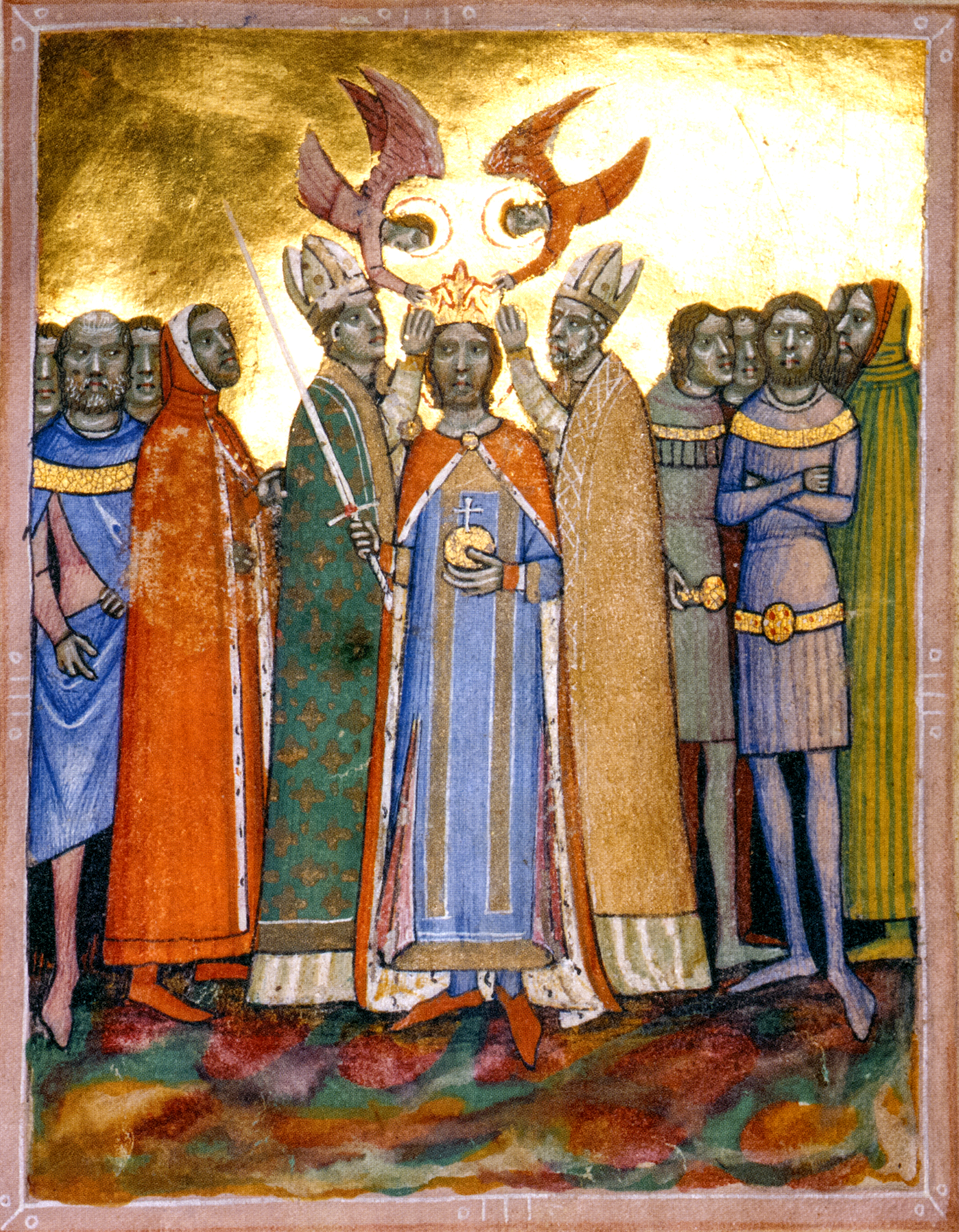
- A possible depiction (Illuminated Chronicle) of Nehemiah during the coronation of St. Ladislaus I
- Archdiocese: Archdiocese of Esztergom
- Appointed: c. 1075
- Term ended: 1077/79
- Predecessor: Benedict I (?)
- Successor: Acha (?)

Personal details
- Died: after 9 June 1077
- Denomination: Roman Catholicism

Nehemiah (Hungarian: Nehémiás; died after 9 June 1077) was a Hungarian prelate and politician, who served as Archbishop of Esztergom in the 1070s, during the reigns of Géza I and Ladislaus I of Hungary.

== Career ==
Nehemiah possibly was born into a highborn family in the 1030s. He is first appeared as archbishop in the founding charter of the Benedictine Abbey of Garamszentbenedek (today Hronský Beňadik, Slovakia) in 1075. Historian László Koszta considered Nehemiah already held the dignity during the last regnal years of the young Solomon. In 1073, peace talks were held in Esztergom between Solomon and Géza, where they concluded a truce with the possible mediation of Nehemiah. After the decisive battle of Mogyoród on 14 March 1074, the archbishop supported Géza's claim to the Hungarian throne. It is possible that the new monarch had approached Pope Gregory VII to obtain international recognition of his rule through Archbishop Nehemiah. In March 1075, Pope Gregory referred to that he has heard many good things about the king and his actions. In April, Gregory recognized Géza's legitimation. Nehemiah crowned Géza with a gold and enamel diadem, sent by Byzantine Emperor Michael VII Doukas in the spring of 1075. That diadem later became the lower part of the Holy Crown of Hungary.

During the Investiture Controversy, Nehemiah sent his envoy to Rome at the end of 1076. This unidentified envoy was present during the turbulent events in the next year, including the so-called Road to Canossa. Nehemiah was a strong supporter of the Gregorian Reforms. Nehemiah is next mentioned by a letter of Pope Gregory VII on 9 June 1077, when requested the archbishop to intercede with Ladislaus in the interest of a diplomatic mission to the papal court. This letter suggests that Nehemiah functioned as a liaison between the Roman Curia and the Hungarian royal court (which confirms his former proactive role in the international recognition of Géza). It is possible that Ladislaus I, who controversially ascended the throne after his brother's death, was crowned king around 1078 by Nehemiah. Under the influence of Nehemiah, the new king supported the pope and Emperor Henry IV's opponents during the Investiture Controversy.

In 1079, Pope Gregory again sent a letter to Ladislaus regarding the subject of the king's diplomatic mission to Rome. As he did not mention Nehemiah despite his previous participation in the compilation of the composition of the legation, it is presumable that he died by then.

== Sources ==
- Koszta, László (2003). "Nehémiás [Nehemiah]". In Beke, Margit (ed.). Esztergomi érsekek 1001–2003 [Archbishops of Esztergom 1001–2003] (in Hungarian). Szent István Társulat. pp. 29–31. ISBN 963-361-472-4.
- Zsoldos, Attila (2011). Magyarország világi archontológiája, 1000–1301 [Secular Archontology of Hungary, 1000–1301] (in Hungarian). História, MTA Történettudományi Intézete. ISBN 978-963-9627-38-3.

Religious titles
Preceded by Benedict I (?)	Archbishop of Esztergom c. 1075–1077/79	Succeeded by Acha (?)
