= Benedict I (archbishop of Esztergom) =

Hungarian prelate and politician

Benedict
- Archbishop of Esztergom
- Archdiocese: Archdiocese of Esztergom
- Appointed: 1046
- Term ended: 1055
- Predecessor: Domonkos II
- Successor: Desiderius

Personal details
- Died: 1055
- Denomination: Roman Catholicism

Benedict (Hungarian: Benedek; died 1055) was a Hungarian prelate and politician, who served as Archbishop of Kalocsa from 1035 to 1046 and as Archbishop of Esztergom between 1046 and 1055.

Benedek was present at the martyrdom of Bishop Gerard of Csanád and his fellows, but he survived the incident. His name is appeared in the founding charter of the Tihany Abbey.

== Bibliography ==
- Beke, Margit (2003). Esztergomi érsekek 1001-2003. Szent István Társulat. ISBN 9789633614723.

Religious titles
Preceded by Astrik	Archbishop of Kalocsa; 1035–1046	Succeeded by George
Preceded by Domonkos II	Archbishop of Esztergom; 1046–1055	Succeeded by Desiderius
