= Seraphin (archbishop of Esztergom) =

Hungarian prelate

- Archbishop of Esztergom
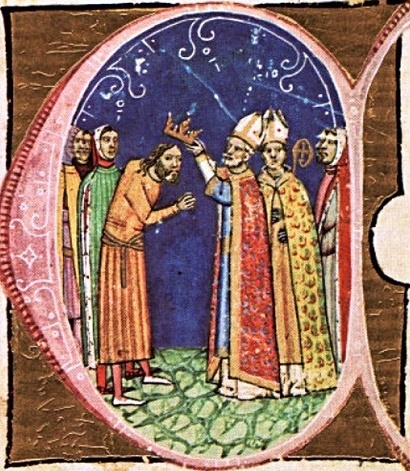
- Seraphin crowns Coloman in early 1096, as depicted in the Illuminated Chronicle
- See: Esztergom
- Appointed: c. 1095
- Term ended: 1104
- Predecessor: Acha
- Successor: Lawrence

Personal details
- Born: 1050s
- Died: 1104

Seraphin (Hungarian: Szerafin; died 1104) was a Hungarian prelate at the turn of the 11th and 12th centuries, who served as Archbishop of Esztergom from around 1095 until his death.

== Career ==
Similarly to other contemporary prelates, the high-born Seraphin was a member of the royal chapel, during the reign of Ladislaus I of Hungary. He first appeared in historical documents in an inventory of the Bakonybél Abbey in 1086, written by Seraphin himself, who then functioned as royal chaplain (thus he was responsible for issuing royal diplomas, as there was no permanent chancellery before the late-12th century). Taking into account his position, it is possible, he was born in the late 1050s or early 1060s. Alongside his two co-chaplains, he was present as a witness at the foundation of the Somogyvár Abbey in 1091.

Seraphin was elected Archbishop of Esztergom in the last months of Ladislaus' reign, in 1094 or most likely early 1095. A 12th-century complement of the Bakonybél inventory referred to him as archbishop, who gained the dignity during the rule of Ladislaus. Just before his death, the king had invited his exiled nephew, Coloman back from Poland, as the Illuminated Chronicle states. Coloman was crowned king by Seraphin in early 1096, the delay implying that he had been fighting for the crown with his brother Álmos before they reached an agreement. Seraphin and Coloman knew each other well, as the new monarch was initially prepared for a church career, and was also consecrated a bishop during Ladislaus' reign. Historian Márta Font argues Coloman could only be crowned after Pope Urban II had released him from his clerical vows at the request of Seraphin.

As a strong confidant of the royal power, Seraphin assisted Coloman, who abandoned his predecessor's foreign policy and supported the pope. Perhaps Seraphin had a crucial role in this process. Still, Coloman rejected the Gregorian Reforms and exercised the royal authority to invest his bishops and abbots. In May 1099, Seraphin escorted his king to Uherské Hradiště at the Bohemian border to meet Duke Bretislaus II, where "they renewed their age-old bonds of friendship and peace and confirmed them with oaths", according to the contemporaneous chronicler Cosmas of Prague. Following that, Herman, Bishop-elect of Prague and Cosmas of Prague were ordained priests by Seraphin in Esztergom in June. Beforehand, Herman was appointed bishop by Henry IV, Holy Roman Emperor in April, thus Seraphin acknowledged the Emperor's right of investiture with the consecration, in accordance with Coloman's standpoint.

Around 1100, Coloman and Seraphin convened a synod in Tarcal, which marked the first steps into the large-scale church organizational and canon law reforms, which characterized the term of Seraphin's successor Lawrence. The prologue of Coloman's first decree dedicated to Seraphin. The eighty-four theses of the council extended the judicial and governmental powers of the bishops, in addition to the regular two-yearly convocation of synods in every bishoprics. The synod also strengthened the bishops' authority over the Benedictine monasteries. These measures defined Hungary's liturgical characteristics for the upcoming century until the Golden Bull of 1222. Subsequently, Seraphin compiled and collected these decrees into a single text, which later was known as Coloman's First Book of Laws. Based on the misinterpretation of 18th-century scholar and prelate Ignác Batthyány, formerly several historians, including Gyula Pauler and Levente Závodszky, considered the first synod of Esztergom occurred still during the archiepiscopal tenure of Seraphin. However, Johannes de Thurocz's Chronica Hungarorum definitely says, both ecclesiastical councils at Esztergom was convened by Seraphin's successor, Lawrence and his suffragans.

Seraphin was last mentioned in 1103, when successfully mediated between Matthew, Bishop of Veszprém and Peter, the abbot of Pannonhalma during a lawsuit. Seraphin is the first Archbishop of Esztergom, whose staff is known in historiography: the episcopal chapel was first mentioned during his tenure. Alberticus, his chaplain of French origin recorded and systematized the canons of the Synod of Tarcal. He wrote its testimonial in a Western-style rhythmic prose. Seraphin's another staff member was the young hospes Fulco, who initially belonged to the allegiance of Duke Álmos, then joined Seraphin's court. After the death of the archbishop, Fulco served five bishops of Veszprém – Matthew, Nana, Martyrius, Peter and Paul – as a cleric, despite his secular status. He made his last will and testament in 1146. Seraphin died in 1104.

== Sources ==
- Jánosi, Monika (1986). "Az első ún. esztergomi zsinati határozatok keletkezésének problémái [The Problems of the Birth of Decrees of the So-Called First Council of Esztergom]". Acta Universitatis Szegediensis: Acta Historica (in Hungarian). 83: 23–30. ISSN 0324-6965.
- Koszta, László (2003). "Szerafin [Seraphin]". In Beke, Margit (ed.). Esztergomi érsekek 1001–2003 [Archbishops of Esztergom 1001–2003] (in Hungarian). Szent István Társulat. pp. 31–36. ISBN 963-361-472-4.
- Thoroczkay, Gábor (2009). "Megjegyzések a Hartvik-féle Szent István-legenda datálásának kérdéséhez [Comments to the Question of the Date of Hartvic's Life of King Stephen of Hungary]". In Thoroczkay, Gábor (ed.). Írások az Árpád-korról. Történeti és historiográfiai tanulmányok [Papers on Árpád Age. Historical and Historiographical Studies] (in Hungarian). L'Harmattan Kiadó. pp. 67–87. ISBN 978-963-236-165-9.
- Zsoldos, Attila (2011). Magyarország világi archontológiája, 1000–1301 [Secular Archontology of Hungary, 1000–1301] (in Hungarian). História, MTA Történettudományi Intézete. ISBN 978-963-9627-38-3.

Catholic Church titles
| Preceded by Acha | Archbishop of Esztergom c. 1095–1104 | Succeeded by Lawrence |
