= Felician (archbishop of Esztergom) =

Hungarian prelate

- Archbishop of Esztergom
- See: Esztergom
- Appointed: c. 1125
- Term ended: c. 1139
- Predecessor: Marcellus
- Successor: Macarius
- Other post: Provost of Székesfehérvár

Personal details
- Died: 1139 or later

Felician (Hungarian: Felicián; died 1139 or later) was a Hungarian prelate in the first half of the 12th century, who served as Archbishop of Esztergom from around 1125 until his presumably death in 1139 or later.

== Career ==
There is no information about his origin and family relationships. Some historians argue that Felician perhaps served as either Bishop of Transylvania (e.g. János Viczián) or Eger (e.g. Gyula Pauler) before his election as Archbishop of Esztergom. He was already active clergyman during the reign of Coloman, King of Hungary. His name appears in the two donation charters of the Zobor Abbey in 1111 and 1113, where he was styled as provost of Fehérvár. Felician was first mentioned as Archbishop of Esztergom by a royal document of grant to a certain Füle (or Fila). Majority of the historians, including Attila Zsoldos and Margit Beke argue Stephen II issued the charter around 1125–28, while Imre Szentpétery dated the narration to the years between 1127 and 1131. Librarian László Fejérpataky marked the year 1131 as the date of the document's issuance.

Felician presided over the coronation of Béla II in Székesfehérvár on 28 April 1131. After Hungarian troops plundered and looted the estates of the Archbishopric of Salzburg in the summer of 1131, Felician mediated between Béla II and Archbishop Conrad to facilitate the conclusion of peace, which was made in Esztergom and it was followed by a long period of stability in the border region. In 1134, he judged over a conflict in a case of the Dubrava forest. His verdict also contains the summarized history of the Diocese of Zagreb, which is the first ever mention of the bishopric, founded by Saint Ladislaus I in the early 1090s. After Split accepted Béla II's suzerainty, Felician consecrated its bishop Gaudius in 1136, which act was objected by Pope Innocent II, as he claimed of papal suzerainty over the territory of Dalmatia. Felician was present at an assembly of the prelates and barons in 1137 in Esztergom, when the child prince Ladislaus was proclaimed Duke of Bosnia by his father Béla. In the same year Felician dedicated the rebuilt Mount of Saint Martin monastery at Pannonhalma (The first buildings of the community had burned down). After the reburial of Béla's father Duke Álmos, Felician listed the complete property of the Dömös Chapter in 1138. Béla and Felician welcomed the missionaries of Otto of Bamberg on 20 April 1139. Felician last appears in contemporary sources on 27 July 1139.

His name is recorded by a 15th-century annotation in a 13th-century famous manuscript Psalterium Davidicum cum calendario, part of the collection of the Batthyaneum Library in Alba Iulia.

== Sources ==
- Beke, Margit (2003). "Felicián [Felician]". In Beke, Margit (ed.). Esztergomi érsekek 1001–2003 [Archbishops of Esztergom 1001–2003] (in Hungarian). Szent István Társulat. pp. 45–49. ISBN 963-361-472-4.
- Zsoldos, Attila (2011). Magyarország világi archontológiája, 1000–1301 [Secular Archontology of Hungary, 1000–1301] (in Hungarian). História, MTA Történettudományi Intézete. ISBN 978-963-9627-38-3.

Catholic Church titles
| Preceded by Marcellus | Archbishop of Esztergom c. 1125–1139 | Succeeded by Macarius |
