= Lawrence (archbishop of Esztergom) =

Hungarian prelate

- Archbishop of Esztergom
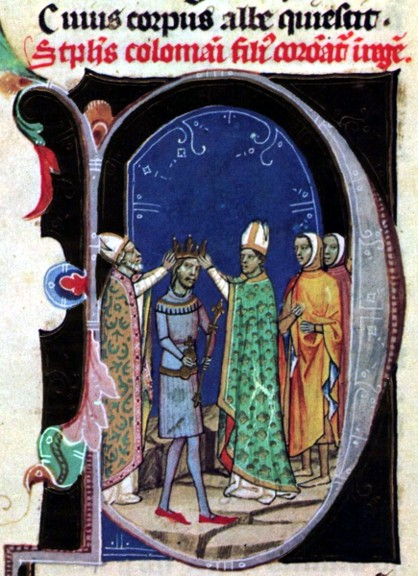
- Lawrence (left) crowns Stephen II, as depicted in the Illuminated Chronicle
- See: Esztergom
- Appointed: 1105 or 1106
- Term ended: 1116 or 1117
- Predecessor: Seraphin
- Successor: Marcellus

Personal details
- Died: 1116 or 1117

Lawrence (Hungarian: Lőrinc; died in 1116 or 1117) was a Hungarian prelate at the turn of the 11th and 12th centuries, who served as Archbishop of Esztergom from around 1105 until his death. He was a faithful confidant of Coloman, King of Hungary and the initiator of large-scale church organizational and canon law reforms in the Kingdom of Hungary.

== Career ==
Lawrence was born into an unidentified illustrious noble family. He was a member of the royal chapel as one of the court clergymen during the reign of Ladislaus I of Hungary. According to historian Nándor Knauz, he was mentioned in this capacity on 17 April 1093. Literary historian László Mezey argued Lawrence studied at Laon, France during his youth, identifying him with that "Laurentius Pannonus", who enrolled in the university in 1100. If this is true, he would be the first known Hungarian cleric who studied abroad. A royal charter from 1111 refers to Lawrence's influence and widespread literacy, who "gladly dealt with sciences". During Coloman's rule (who was initially prepared for a church career), Lawrence served as royal chaplain. 17th-century Jesuit scholar Sándor Szörényi claimed Lawrence served as Bishop of Eger from 1104 to 1105 prior to his election as metropolitan of Esztergom, but there is no contemporary record of that. Nevertheless, numerous authors, including Márton Szentiványi, György Pray and Miklós Schmitth accepted the data in the upcoming decades.

After the death of Seraphin in 1104, Lawrence became Archbishop of Esztergom. He first appeared in that capacity around 1105 or 1106. Under his tenure, he was a strong confidant of Coloman and advocated his foreign policy in the assistance of Pope Paschal II in the long struggle with the Holy Roman Emperors over investiture. Nevertheless, Coloman sought to keep the country's independence also against the Church, with which the archbishop agreed. As a result, Lawrence supported the military campaign against Dalmatia, which violated the Pope's interests. Provost Theobald represented Lawrence and his monarch in the Synod of Dalmatia in 1106. Lawrence consecrated the monastery at Dömös around 1108, erected by King Coloman's rebellious brother, Duke Álmos. On the occasion of its consecration, where Coloman was also present, Álmos was—falsely, according to the Illuminated Chronicle—accused of an assassination attempt on the monarch. Coloman decided to have his brother arrested, but "the most reverend bishops and other well-disposed dignitaries" with the leadership of Lawrence, intervened on Álmos's behalf and "thus reconciliation was solemnly sworn" between Coloman and his brother. Lawrence's name appeared in a royal document in May 1108, when Coloman confirmed the privileges of Trogir. Lawrence escorted Coloman along with six bishops and several secular barons to Dalmatia, when the king reaffirmed the privileges of Split, Trogir, and Zadar in 1111. A non-authentic royal charter from that year confirms the assumption that Archbishop Lawrence simultaneously functioned as royal chaplain and was responsible for issuing royal diplomas. He was mentioned as the first within Coloman's companion by the two establishing charters of the Zobor Abbey, issued in 1111 and 1113.

According to the Annales Posonienses, Lawrence died in 1114, however the years of annals often proved wrong, a few years difference detected in the majority of cases. In fact, Lawrence survived Coloman, who died on 3 February 1116, and his funeral at the Székesfehérvár Cathedral was celebrated by Lawrence. In the same place, Stephen II was crowned king by Archbishop Lawrence within thirty days of his father's death. The contemporaneous Cosmas of Prague referred to Lawrence as a living person at the beginning of the Stephen's reign, when the young king provocated a war against Vladislaus I of Bohemia, as the Czech chronicler narrated in his work Chronica Boemorum. Accordingly, Lawrence and his troops rescued Stephen from the battlefield near the river Olšava, where the Bohemian army inflicted a serious defeat on Stephen's army on 13 May. Lawrence died soon, possibly in either 1116 or 1117.

== Church reforms ==
Large-scale church organizational reforms took place during the episcopate of Archbishop Lawrence. It is presumable that the so-called First and Second Synods of Esztergom, decrees of which was preserved at the earliest by the Pray Codex, were convened at the beginning of Lawrence's service as Archbishop of Esztergom. Gábor Thoroczkay argues the first synod occurred around 1106 or 1107, which Lawrence and his ten suffragan bishops attended, according to the 15th-century Johannes de Thurocz's Chronica Hungarorum (despite that, formerly, historian Gyula Pauler rejected this and put the date of the first synod to the reign of Ladislaus I). According to Monika Jánosi, the first synod summoned by 1112 at the latest, just before the establishment of the Diocese at Nyitra (Nitra), when the numbers of Hungarian bishops raised to twelve. As Thoroczkay notes, the description of the Chronica Hungarorum (ten bishops) is exaggerated, which reflects the Archdiocese of Esztergom's aspirations to become the only Metropolitan province. The first Zobor charter, issued by Lawrence's chancellery at the royal court, also styled Paul, the Archbishop of Kalocsa as simply "bishop". Lawrence had an important role in the convocation of the synod to provide and outline his efforts as newly elected archbishop. Excluding secular participants, the synod and its organizing method reflected the spirit of the Gregorian Reforms. Its seventy-two theses, for instance, contained the regulations of ecclesiastical jurisdiction, the way of life of the clergy and the definition of church property. The theses also proved that canonical literature has spread during the primacy of Lawrence. The First Synod of Esztergom was influenced by the resolutions of the Councils of Piacenza (1095) and Poitiers (1100), while Lawrence and his prelates also utilized the texts of the Pseudo-Isidorian Decretals and the Collectio Dionysio-Hadriana. The liturgy rulebook Benedictionale Strigoniense (Hungarian: Esztergomi benedikcionále) was written under the reign of Lawrence, sometime after 1108, according to historian Dorottya Uhrin, who also argues there was no a single "first council" at Esztergom, and its 68 or 72 decrees were adopted continuously in the occasions of several synods, throughout the years of the archiepiscopal tenure of Lawrence. Thereafter, the decrees were compiled into a single document.

The Second Synod of Esztergom most probably took place in March 1112, when papal legate Cuno of Praeneste resided in Hungary on his way from Constantinople to Rome. Medievalists László Koszta and Gábor Thoroczkay identified the synod with that meeting in Esztergom, where Cuno excommunicated Henry V, Holy Roman Emperor for the brief imprisonment of Pope Paschal. The sixteen theses of the second synod marked the strong influence of the Gregorian directives. The first three points strengthened the royal power in order to support Coloman against his claimant brother Álmos, who took assistance from the Holy Roman Empire. Other historians, such as Kornél Szovák and Dorottya Uhrin, deny the connection between the second synod and papal legate Cuno's activity in Hungary. Uhrin says, the so-called second synod was held during the last regnal years of King Coloman.

Under Archbishop Lawrence, the formation of the church organization extended to Upper Hungary. The two documents of the Zobor Abbey show that Coloman set up the bishopric at Nyitra between 1111 and 1113, or a few years earlier. Its first bishop Gervasius' acts in lawsuits prove that he was considered Lawrence's suffragan bishop, as he functioned as a court of appeal in the cases involved by the Diocese of Nyitra. Since Lawrence's episcopate, tensions appear to have emerged between the sees Esztergom and Kalocsa. When Pope Paschal sent pallium to Ugolin around 1105–06 and demanded oath of fealty from him, Lawrence tried to prevent it. This rivalry also appeared in the coeval Life of King Stephen of Hungary, compiled by Hartvik, Bishop of Győr (thus a subordinate to Lawrence), when it derived the title of the superior of Kalocsa from Esztergom, emphasizing its subsidiarity. Lawrence refused to recognize the Archdiocese of Kalocsa as an equal see in the ecclesiastical hierarchy.

== Sources ==
- Haraszti Szabó, Péter; Kelényi, Borbála (2019). Magyarországi diákok francia, angol, itáliai és német egyetemeken a középkorban, 1100–1526 [Students from Hungary at the Universities of France, England, Italy and Germany in the Middle Ages 1100–1526] (in Hungarian). ELTE Egyetemi Könyvtár és Levéltár; MTA ELTE Egyetemtörténeti Kutatócsoport. ISBN 978-963-489-098-0.
- Jánosi, Monika (1986). "Az első ún. esztergomi zsinati határozatok keletkezésének problémái [The Problems of the Birth of Decrees of the So-Called First Council of Esztergom]". Acta Universitatis Szegediensis: Acta Historica (in Hungarian). 83: 23–30. ISSN 0324-6965.
- Koszta, László (2003). "Lőrinc [Lawrence]". In Beke, Margit (ed.). Esztergomi érsekek 1001–2003 [Archbishops of Esztergom 1001–2003] (in Hungarian). Szent István Társulat. pp. 36–42. ISBN 963-361-472-4.
- Sugár, István (1984). Az egri püspökök története [The History of the Bishops of Eger] (in Hungarian). Szent István Társulat. ISBN 963-360-392-7.
- Thoroczkay, Gábor (2009). "Megjegyzések a Hartvik-féle Szent István-legenda datálásának kérdéséhez [Comments to the Question of the Date of Hartvic's Life of King Stephen of Hungary]". In Thoroczkay, Gábor (ed.). Írások az Árpád-korról. Történeti és historiográfiai tanulmányok [Papers on Árpád Age. Historical and Historiographical Studies] (in Hungarian). L'Harmattan Kiadó. pp. 67–87. ISBN 978-963-236-165-9.
- Uhrin, Dorottya (2019). "Az ún. I. és II. esztergomi zsinat és a Pray-kódex [The So-Called First and Second Councils of Esztergom and the Pray Codex]". In Bartók, Zsófia Ágnes; Horváth, Balázs (eds.). Írások a Pray-kódexről [Papers on Pray Codex] (in Hungarian). Argumentum Kiadó – ELTE BTK Vallástudományi Központ Liturgiatörténeti Kutatócsoport. pp. 19–28. ISBN 978-963-446-811-0.
- Zsoldos, Attila (2011). Magyarország világi archontológiája, 1000–1301 [Secular Archontology of Hungary, 1000–1301] (in Hungarian). História, MTA Történettudományi Intézete. ISBN 978-963-9627-38-3.

Catholic Church titles
Preceded by Seraphin	Archbishop of Esztergom c. 1105–1116	Succeeded by Marcellus
