= Archdiocese of Esztergom–Budapest =

Latin Catholic archdiocese in Hungary

Coordinates: 47.7989°N 18.7364°E

Archdiocese of Esztergom-Budapest Archidioecesis Strigoniensis-Budapestinensis Esztergom–Budapesti Főegyházmegye

Catholic
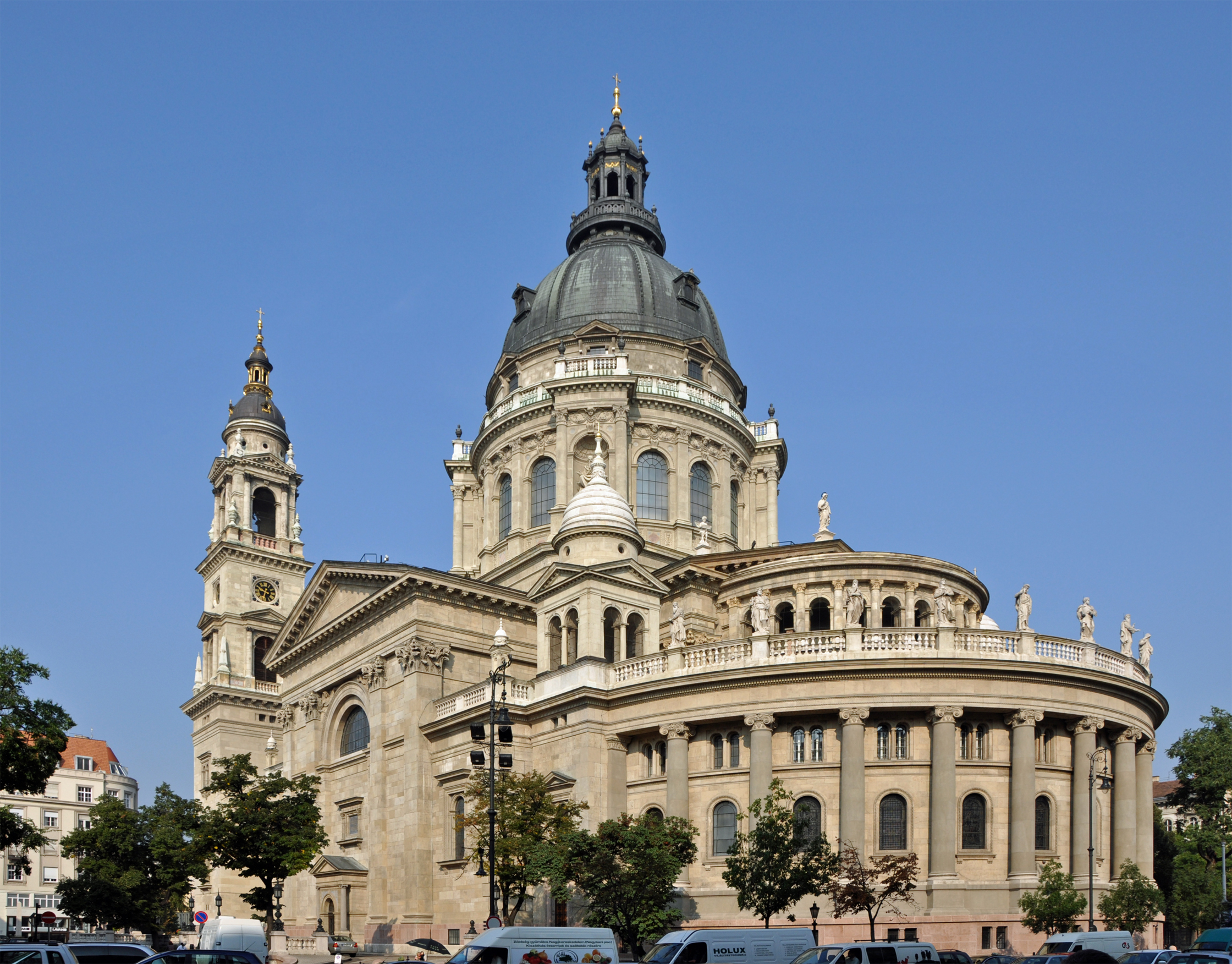
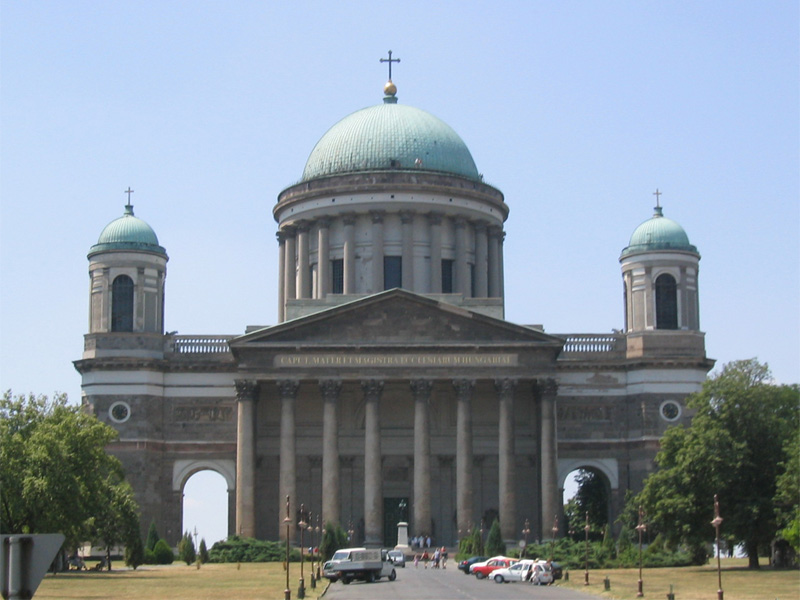
- St Stephen's Basilica Esztergom Basilica

Location
- Country: Hungary
- Territory: Esztergom-Budapest
- Ecclesiastical province: Esztergom-Budapest

Statistics
- Area: 1,543 km^{2} (596 sq mi)
- Population: Total; Catholics: (as of 2016); ▼2,078,000; ▼1,249,000 (60.1%)
- Parishes: 188

Information
- Denomination: Catholic Church
- Sui iuris church: Latin Church
- Rite: Roman Rite
- Established: 10th century (Archdiocese of Esztergom); 31 May 1993 (As Archdiocese of Esztergom–Budapest)
- Cathedral: The Primatial Basilica of the Assumption of the Blessed Virgin Mary and St Adalbert
- Co-cathedral: St. Stephen's Basilica
- Patron saint: Adalbert of Prague

Current leadership
- Pope: Leo XIV
- Metropolitan Archbishop: Cardinal Péter Erdő
- Suffragans: Diocese of Győr, Diocese of Székesfehérvár
- Auxiliary Bishops: Martos Levente Balázs; Gábor Mohos, Kornél Fábry
- Bishops emeritus: Gáspár Ladocsi

Map
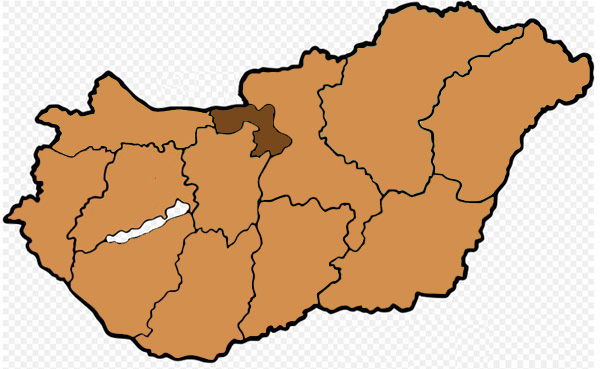
- Map of the Archdiocese

Website
- esztergomi-ersekseg.hu

The Archdiocese of Esztergom–Budapest (Latin: Archidioecesis Strigoniensis–Budapestinensis; Hungarian: Esztergom-Budapesti főegyházmegye) is a Latin Church archdiocese and primatial seat of the Roman Catholic Church in Hungary and the metropolitan see of one of Hungary's four Latin Church ecclesiastical provinces.

The archdiocese's archbishop retains the title of "Primate", which gives this see precedence over all other Latin Hungarian dioceses, including the fellow Metropolitan Archbishops of Eger, Kalocsa–Kecskemét and Veszprém, but the incumbent may be individually (and temporarily) outranked if one of them holds a (higher) cardinalate. Its current Archbishop is Péter Erdő.

== Duality and special churches ==
Its double name reflects that it has (co-)cathedral sees in two major Hungarian cities, the old primatial archiepiscopal seat Esztergom and the present national capital Budapest. These two prominent cities fall under the tutelage of one archdiocese due to Hungary's early history wherein Esztergom was one of the former capitals of the Kingdom of Hungary (much larger than the present republic – roughly the eastern half of the Habsburg monarchy).

The archiepiscopal Cathedral and primatial see is Nagyboldogasszony és Szent Adalbert főszékesegyház, in Esztergom-Vár.

The co-cathedral, a minor basilica and World Heritage Site, is St. Stephen's Basilica in Budapest-Szentistvánváros.

The archdiocese has a second minor basilica, Kisboldogasszony-templom, Máriaremete, in Budapest.

== Statistics ==
As of 2016, it pastorally served 1,249,000 Catholics (60.1% of 2,078,000 population) covering 1,543 km^{2} in 188 parishes and 28 missions with (in 2014) 435 priests (254 diocesan, 181 religious), 23 deacons, 725 lay religious (266 brothers, 459 sisters) and 38 seminarians.

== Ecclesiastical province ==
The Metropolitan's suffragan sees are the Latin bishops of:

- Roman Catholic Diocese of Győr
- Roman Catholic Diocese of Székesfehérvár

The former Roman Catholic Diocese of Hajdúdorog, until then also its suffragan, was elevated in 2015 to Hungarian Greek Catholic Archeparchy of Hajdúdorog (Eastern Catholic archdiocese), now the Metropolitan (with two suffragans in his own province) in chief of the Hungarian Greek Catholic Church, of Byzantine Rite.

== History ==
It was founded in 1001 by Stephen I of Hungary, as the Metropolitan Archdiocese of Esztergom, on Hungarian territories split off from the dioceses of Nitra, Passau and Regensburg (the latter two with sees in Bavaria, southern Germany). It had a uniquely prominent status, giving the archbishop the title of prince primate, and the privilege of crowning the kings of Hungary.

The Cathedral of Saint Adalbert was consecrated in 1010. The archdiocese lost territory in 1227 to establish the Diocese of Milcovia, but in 1542 gained territory back from the suppressed Diocese of Milcovia.

The archbishop and chaplaincy relocated to Nagyszombat in 1543 before Esztergom fell to the Ottoman Empire. Saint Nicolas Church served as the cathedral. Ottoman occupation of the archdiocese made pastoral care difficult and Protestant teachings spread. Archbishop Miklós Oláh re-established the Esztergom cathedral school at Nagyszombat, and in 1561 invited the Jesuits to administer it. The Archbishops of Esztergom resided also in Pressburg (the old name of Bratislava), they built the Primate's Palace (the current city hall of Bratislava) and the Episcopal Summer Palace (now the seat of the government of Slovakia), when Pressburg was the capital of the Kingdom of Hungary and St Martin's Church (now the Cathedral of Bratislava) was the coronation church of the King of Hungary.

In 1619, Primate Péter Pázmány founded the Pázmáneum in Vienna as a seminary to train Hungarian candidates for the priesthood. in 1776, the archdiocese was split to establish the suffragan sees of Banská Bystrica, Rožňava and Spiš. In 1820, the episcopal see returned to Esztergom. Work began to restore the cathedral in 1822. The upper church was consecrated in 1856 and saw the premier of Franz Liszt's Missa solennis.

In June 1912, the archdiocese lost territory with the establishment of the Eparchy of Hajdúdorog (as its suffragan; now a Byzantine rite Metropolitan Archeparchy) and in May 1922 to establish the Apostolic Administration of Trnava. In 1938 the 34th International Eucharistic Congress was held in Budapest. In 1948 Cardinal József Mindszenty was arrested and imprisoned by the government. Freed during the short-lived Hungarian Revolution of 1956, Mindszenty was granted political asylum at the United States embassy in Budapest when the Russians invaded.

In August 1991, the archdiocese received a papal visit from Pope John Paul II. Diocesan boundaries were redrawn in 1993 and the Archdiocese renamed the Metropolitan Archdiocese of Esztergom–Budapest, having gained territory from Diocese of Székesfehérvár (which became its suffragan) and Diocese of Vác. St. Stephen's Basilica was named co-cathedral.

== List of archbishops ==
- Dominic (archbishop 1000)
- Sebastian (archbishop 1001)
- Radla (archbishop 1002)
- Anastaz-Astrik (archbishop ca. 1007)
- Sebestyén (again) (archbishop after 1012)
- Benedict (archbishop 1046–1055)
- Nehemiah (archbishop 1075 – 1077/79)
- Acha (archbishop 1087 – ca. 1090)
- Seraphin (archbishop 1094)
- Lawrence (archbishop 1105)
- Marcellus (archbishop 1116)
- Felician (archbishop 1127)
- Macarius (b. 1143–b. 1150)
- Kökényes (archbishop 1150)
- Martyrius (archbishop 1151)
- Lucas (archbishop 1158)
- Nicholas (1181–1183)
- Job (archbishop 1185)
- Ugrin de genere Csák (archbishop April 1204 – August 1204)
- Kalán de genere Bár-Kalán (archbishop 1204)
- John (archbishop 1205)
- Thomas (archbishop February–November 1224)
- Robert (1226–1239)
- Matthias de genere Rátót (primate, archbishop 1239)
- Stephen de genere Báncsa (archbishop, cardinal 1242)
- Benedict (archbishop 1254)
- Philip Türje (archbishop 1262)
- Miklós (Nicholas) de genere Kán (archbishop 1273)
- Benedict (archbishop 1274)
- Miklós (Nicholas) de genere Kán (again) (archbishop 1276)
- Peter Kőszegi de genere Héder (archbishop 1277)
- Lodomer (1279–1298)
- Gregory Bicskei (archbishop-elect, 1298–1303)
- Mihály (Michael) de genere Bő (archbishop 1303)
- Thomas (archbishop 1305)
- Boleslav Piast (archbishop 1321)
- Miklós (Nicholas) Dörögdi (archbishop 1329)
- Csanád Telegdi (archbishop 1330)
- Nicholas Vásári (archbishop 1350)
- Miklós (Nicholas) Apáti (archbishop 1358)
- Tamás (Thomas) Telegdi (archbishop 1367)
- János (John) De Surdis (archbishop 1376)
- Demeter (archbishop 1378)
- János (John) Kanizsai (primate, archbishop from 1387 to 1395)
- Péter (Peter) (apostolic coadjutor – 1418)
- László (Ladislaus) Csetneki (apostolic coadjutor – 1418)
- György (George) Hohenlohe (apostolic coadjutor – 1418)
- János (John) Borsnitz (apostolic coadjutor – 1418)
- György Pálóczy (primate, archbishop – 1423)
- Dénes Szécsi (primate, archbishop – 1440)
- János Vitéz (primate, archbishop – 1465–1472)
- Johann Beckenschlager (primate, archbishop 15 Mar 1474 – 21 Mar 1487)
- John of Aragon (primate, archbishop – 1480)
- Hippolytus Cardinal Este (primate, archbishop – 1486)
- Tamás Bakócz (primate, archbishop, cardinal – 1497–1521)
- György Szatmári (primate, archbishop – 1522)
- László Szalkai (primate, archbishop – 1524)
- Pál Várdai (primate, archbishop 1526 – 12 Oct 1549)
- Giorgio Martinuzzi (primate, archbishop, cardinal – 1551)
- Miklós Oláh (primate, archbishop – 1553)
- Antal Verancsics (Antun Vrančić) (primate, archbishop 17 Oct 1569 – 15 Jun 1573)
- Miklós Telegdy (primate, archbishop 1580 – 22 Apr 1586)
- István Fehérkövi (primate, archbishop – 1596)
- János Kutasi (primate, archbishop – 1597)
- Ferenc Forgách (primate, archbishop – 1607)
- Péter Pázmány, S.J. (primate, archbishop, cardinal 28 Oct 1616 – 19 Mar 1637)
- Imre Lósi (primate, archbishop – 1637)
- György Lippay (primate, archbishop – 1642)
- György Szelepcsényi (primate, archbishop – 1666)
- György Széchényi (primate, archbishop – 1685)
- Leopold Karl, Graf von Kollonitsch (primate, archbishop, cardinal 22 Aug 1695 – 20 Jan 1707)
  - Coadjutor Archbishop: Cardinal Christian August of Saxe-Zeitz (24 Jan 1701 – 20 Jan 1707)
- Christian August of Saxe-Zeitz (prince primate, archbishop, cardinal 20 Jan 1707 – 23 Aug 1725)
- Imre Esterházy (prince primate, archbishop – 1725)
- Miklós Csáky (prince primate, archbishop – 1751)
- Ferenc Barkóczy (prince primate, archbishop – 1761)
- Vacant (1765 – 1776)
- József Batthyány (prince primate, archbishop 20 May 1776 – 23 Oct 1799)
- Vacant (1799 – 1809)
- Karl Ambrosius of Austria (prince primate, archbishop 16 Mar 1808 – 2 Sep 1809)
- Vacant (1809 – 1819)
- Alexander Rudnay (prince primate, archbishop 17 Dec 1819 – 13 Sep 1831)
- Vacant (1831 – 1838)
- József Kopácsy (prince primate, archbishop 15 Dec 1838 – 17 Sept 1847)
- János Hám (prince primate, archbishop June 1848 – July 1849)
- János Scitovszky (prince primate, archbishop 28 Sep 1849 – 19 Oct 1866)
- János Simor (prince primate, archbishop 22 Feb 1867 – 23 Jan 1891 )
- Kolos Ferenc Vaszary, O.S.B. (prince primate, archbishop, cardinal 13 Dec 1891 – 1 Jan 1913)
- János Csernoch (prince primate, archbishop, cardinal 13 Dec 1912 – 25 Jul 1927)
- Jusztinián György Serédi, O.S.B. (prince primate, archbishop, cardinal 30 Nov 1927 – 29 Mar 1945)
- The Venerable József Mindszenty (prince primate, archbishop, cardinal 2 Oct 1945 – 18 Dec 1973)
  - Endre Hamvas (apostolic coadjutor 18. July 1950)
  - Mihály Endrey (apostolic coadjutor 9. February 1957)
  - Artur Schwarz-Eggenhoffer (apostolic coadjutor 6. June 1957)
  - Imre Szabó (apostolic coadjutor 10. January 1957)
  - Imre Kisberk (apostolic coadjutor 28. September 1971)
  - László Lékai (as apostolic coadjutor 2. February 1974)
- László Lékai (as primate, archbishop, cardinal 12 Feb 1976 – 30 Jun 1986)
- László Paskai (primate, archbishop, cardinal 3 March 1987 – 7 Dec. 2002 see below).

Metropolitan Archbishops of Esztergom–Budapest

- László Paskai (see above 3 March 1987 – 7 December 2002) (As Archbishop of Esztergom until 1993)
  - Auxiliary Bishop: Imre Asztrik Várszegi, O.S.B. (1988.12.23 – 1991.03.18)
  - Auxiliary Bishop: Vilmos Dékány, Sch. P. (1988.12.23 – 2000.05.19)
  - Auxiliary Bishop: Archbishop Csaba Ternyák (later Archbishop) (1992.12.24 – 1997.12.11)
  - Auxiliary Bishop: Antal Spányi (1998.02.13 – 2003.04.04)
  - Auxiliary Bishop: Miklós Beer (2000.04.08 – 2003.05.27)
  - Auxiliary Bishop: Gáspár Ladocsi (2001.11.28 – 2010.11.26)
- Péter Erdő (7 December 2002 – ...), created Cardinal-Priest of S. Maria Nuova (2003.10.21 [2004.03.09] – ...), also President of Hungarian Episcopal Conference (2005.09 – 2015.09.02), President of Council of European Bishops' Conferences (2006.10.08 – 2016.10.08); previously Titular Bishop of Puppi (1999.11.05 – 2002.12.07) as Auxiliary Bishop of Székesfehérvár (Hungary) (1999.11.05 – 2002.12.07)
  - Auxiliary Bishop: László Kiss-Rigó (2004.01.24 – 2006.06.20)
  - Auxiliary Bishop: György Udvardy (2004.01.24 – 2011.04.09)
  - Auxiliary Bishop: János Székely (2007.11.14 – 2017.06.18)
  - Auxiliary bishop Ferenc Cserháti (2007.06.15 – ...), Titular Bishop of Centuria (2007.06.15 – ...)
  - Auxiliary bishop György Snell (2014.10.20 – 2021.02.26), Titular Bishop of Pudentiana (2014.10.20 – 2021.02.26)

=== Auxiliary episcopate ===
  - Auxiliary Bishop: István Bagi (1979.03.31 – 1986.01.31)
  - Auxiliary Bishop: Iván Pálos (1975.01.07 – 1987.03.28)
  - Auxiliary Bishop: György Zemplén (1969.01.10 – 1973.03.29)
  - Auxiliary Bishop: Mihály Endrey-Eipel (1957–1972)
  - Auxiliary Bishop: Imre Szabó (1951.03.11 – 1976.05.21)
  - Auxiliary Bishop: Blessed Zoltán Lajos Meszlényi (1937.09.22 – 1953.01.11)
  - Auxiliary Bishop: Stefano Breyer (1929.04.05 – 1933.12.13)
  - Auxiliary Bishop: Lajos Rajner (1906.06.14 – 1920.03.27)
  - Auxiliary Bishop: Josef Medard Kohl, O.S.B. (1900.12.17 – 1928.01.15)
  - Auxiliary Bishop: Paulus Palásthy (1886.05.04 – 1899.09.24)
  - Auxiliary Bishop: József Boltizár (1875.08.24 – 1905.05.17)
  - Auxiliary Bishop: Joseph Szabó (1868.06.22 – 1884.04.27)
  - Auxiliary Bishop: Giuseppe Durguth (1865.09.25 – ?)
  - Auxiliary Bishop: Emerico Tóth (1857.09.25 – 1865.01.06)
  - Auxiliary Bishop: Jozef Viber (1856.06.19 – 1866.01.15)
  - Auxiliary Bishop: Joseph Krautmann (1852.03.15 – 1855)
  - Auxiliary Bishop: Peter de Ürményi (1820.08.28 – 1839.11.15)
  - Auxiliary Bishop: Giovanni Benyovszky (1820.08.28 – 1827?)
  - Auxiliary Bishop: Istvan Gosztonyi (1815.12.18 – 1817)
  - Auxiliary Bishop: Karol Perényl (1808.07.11 – 1819.03.15)
  - Auxiliary Bishop: Nikolaus Rauscher (1808.03.16 – 1815)
  - Auxiliary Bishop: József Király (1807.09.18 – 1808.01.11)
  - Auxiliary Bishop: Márton Görgey (1804.09.24 – 1807.08.01)
  - Auxiliary Bishop: Ladislaus Luzenszky (1779.12.13 – 1792)
  - Auxiliary Bishop: Stephanus Nagy (1776.12.16 – 1804)
  - Auxiliary Bishop: Georgius Richvaldszky (1776.12.16 – 1779.08.07)
  - Auxiliary Bishop: Anton Révay (1754.05.20 – 1776.09.16)
  - Auxiliary Bishop: Paulus de Révay (1753.03.12 – 1776)
  - Auxiliary Bishop: Ferenc Zichy (1742.09.24 – 1744.03.16)
  - Auxiliary Bishop: Giorgio Trivulzio, B. (1678.11.07 – 1689)

== See also ==
- List of Catholic dioceses in Hungary
- Esztergom Basilica
- Catholic Church in Hungary
- Primate's Palace (the former residence of the Archbishops of Esztergom in Pressburg)
- Episcopal Summer Palace (other former residence of the Archbishops of Esztergom in Pressburg)

== Sources and external links ==
- GCatholic.org with Google map – data for all sections
- Archdiocese of Esztergom–Budapest website (only in Hungarian)
- Catholic Hierarchy
- History of the Archdiocese (only in Hungarian)
- Herbermann, Charles, ed. (1913). "Archdiocese of Gran" . Catholic Encyclopedia. New York: Robert Appleton Company.
