= Zobor Abbey =

Abbey on Zobor hill in Nitra, Slovakia

Coordinates: 48.3453°N 18.0917°E

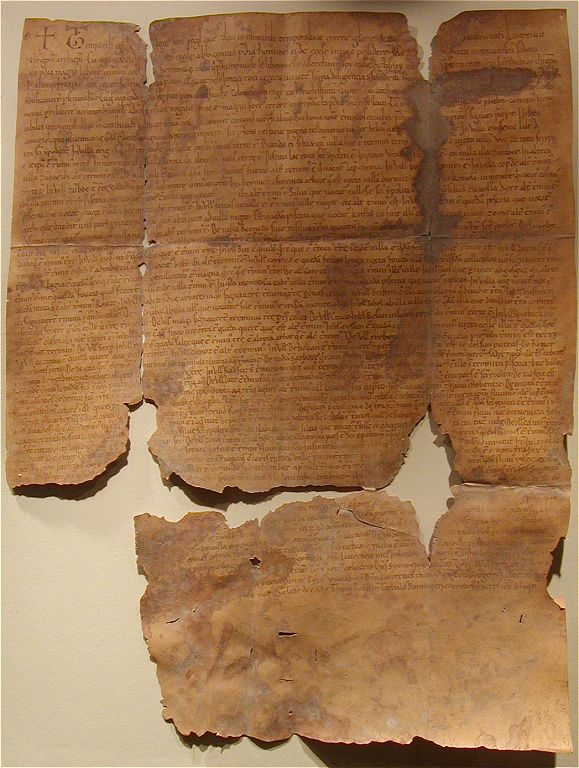
The copy of the founding decree of Zobor Abbey (from 1113)

Zobor Abbey was a Benedictine monastery established at Zobor (today part of Nitra, Slovakia) in the Kingdom of Hungary. The abbey was first mentioned by royal charters issued in 1111 and 1113, during the rule of Coloman, King of Hungary.

== Sources ==
- Font, Márta (2001). Koloman the Learned, King of Hungary (Supervised by Gyula Kristó, Translated by Monika Miklán). Márta Font (supported by the Publication Commission of the Faculty of Humanities of the University of Pécs). ISBN 963-482-521-4.
