= Boleslaus (bishop of Vác) =

Hungarian prelate

- Bishop of Vác
- Installed: 1193
- Term ended: 1212
- Predecessor: Job
- Successor: James

Personal details
- Born: 1130s
- Died: 1212 or 1213
- Denomination: Catholic

Boleslaus (Hungarian: Boleszló, Slovak: Boleslav; died 1212 or 1213) was a prelate in the Kingdom of Hungary at the turn of the 12th and 13th centuries. He was Bishop of Vác between 1193 and 1212. He supported Duke Andrew during the Duke's conflict with his brother, King Emeric of Hungary.

== Early life ==
Boleslaus was born in the 1130s into a prominent noble family, but his parentage and origin is unknown. He had a brother (or at least, relative; frater) Elvin, also a prelate, who served as Bishop of Várad (present-day Oradea, Romania) from 1189 to 1200. Based on the geographical location of their landholdings, historian Vince Bunyitay considered that both of them belonged to the gens (clan) Becsegergely. Other historians – including Samu Borovszky and Ferenc Chobot – accepted his interpretation. Boleslaus' godfather was the reigning monarch, Béla II of Hungary (r. 1131–1141) at his birth, according to later documents. Boleslaus was granted the royal estate of Lelesz (present-day Leles, Slovakia) as a christening gift by Béla II (before that Lelesz belonged to the surrounding estates of Zemplén Castle).

By the reign of Stephen III of Hungary (r. 1162–1172), Boleslaus was elevated into the position of provost of the collegiate chapter of Buda in the 1160s. Possibly he is identical with that provost "Boleslav" (with unspecified see), who appeared in a contemporary document in 1162. Stephen III sent him to draft and determine the borders of the Szentjobb Abbey (present-day Sâniob in Romania) around 1169. Boleslaus himself recorded the description in a charter, which implies that he was also a member of the royal chapel during that time. It is possible that Boleslaus is identical with that unnamed provost of Buda, who was mentioned in a royal charter of 1178 with dubious authenticity, which only preserved the first letter of his name ("B"), but this may also apply to his successor Barnabas.

Boleslaus participated in the Hungarian military campaign to the Principality of Galicia in 1188, when Béla III of Hungary (r. 1172–1196) invaded the principality and installed his son Andrew as Prince of Galicia. For his participation, Béla III granted the king's share (one third part) of the port duty of Szolnok along the river Tisza to Boleslaus, who also acquired the village of Kabala with the approval of the monarch. Later, Boleslaus handed over this land to his nephew, Marhard in exchange for his portion at Lelesz. Boleslaus also owned a settlement, Árpád in Bihar County (present-day Arpășel, Romania), which he exchanged for the village of Kanyár in Szabolcs County with Lawrence, abbot of Gyulamonostor (today Mănăstirea, Romania) with the approval of Vata (or Wasca), the Bishop of Várad.

== Bishop of Vác ==
=== Foundation of the Lelesz Provostry ===
Boleslaus was first styled as Bishop of Vác in 1188, when Béla III donated the third quarter portion of the local fair duty to the cathedral chapter of Esztergom. However this royal charter proved to be a forgery, although its list of dignitaries – where Boleslaus' name appeared – is reliable. Boleslaus was first referred to as bishop by an authentic document only in 1193. His last known predecessor was Job, who held the position a decade earlier and was later elevated into the Archdiocese of Esztergom. Immediately after his election, Boleslaus requested the permission of Pope Celestine III to hold annual diocesan synods on 8 September (Nativity of Mary), who approved in 1193. In order to financially support his bishopric, Boleslaus waived his share (a quarter, called quarta episcopi) of the tithe in favor of the lower clergy and vicars.

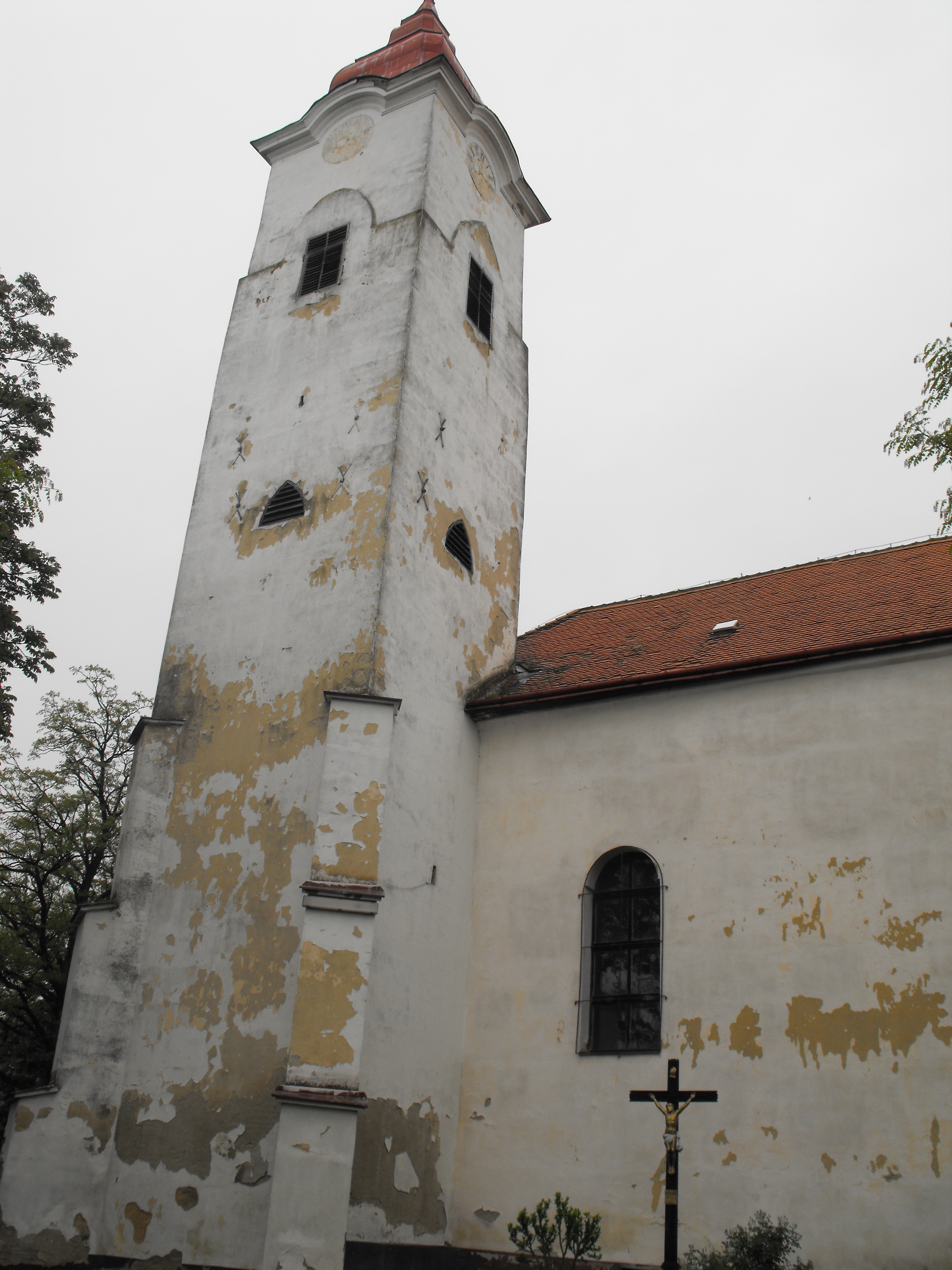
The church of Leles (Lelesz), present-day Slovakia

According to a royal charter of Béla IV of Hungary (r. 1235–1270) issued in 1252, Boleslaus founded the monastery of Lelesz on his own possession sometime in the early 1190s, the last regnal years of Béla III. The bishop invited Premonstratensian monks to Hungary, and the new monastery directly connected to the religious order's mother house, the Prémontré Abbey as its filial church. The circumstances of the foundation was preserved by a royal charter of Andrew II, issued in 1214. In this document, the king recorded the second last will and testament of Boleslaus, who died prior to that, and listed his donated lands and properties in favor of the Lelesz provostry. According to the document's narration, the bishop's first last will – which was confirmed by Béla III – "was lost during the reign of Emeric" (see below for details), therefore, it was necessary to re-record the donations. Andrew's charter is considered to be the founding decree of the Lelesz Abbey. Beside the fulfillment of Boleslaus' last will, the king provided judicial, ecclesiastical privileges and exemptions of certain taxes to the monastery and its people. Since the 20th century, several Hungarian and Slovak historians – including László Erdélyi, Bálint Hóman, Imre Szentpétery and Richard Marsina – classified the document as a forgery, because of the misinterpretations and insertions in later transcribed versions of the original document, which has now been lost. In contrast, historian Géza Érszegi accepted the document as authentic, arguing it was written when Boleslaus was still alive, but was sealed by the monarch only a year later, in 1214, because the assassination of Queen Gertrude delayed and prevented the consecration of the monastery still in that year. Érszegi refuted some of Erdélyi's argument, who claimed the charter contains numerous anachronistic elements, for instance Andrew's heir Béla was referred to as king. However, as Érszegi emphasized, the eight-year-old Béla was crowned as junior king (rex iunior) by some lords, who opposed Andrew's policy, in the same year, and Andrew was forced to acknowledge it.

Andrew's charter does not refer to Boleslaus as founder of the provostry. Its establishment was a lengthy process with series of land donations. This culminated into the 1214 establishing charter. According to the document, Boleslaus donated and bequeathed large-scale landholdings in Zemplén – Királyhelmec (Kráľovský Chlmec), Kisdobra (Dobrá), Pólyán (Poľany), Csernyő (Čierna), Kisgéres (Malý Horeš), Agárd, Vajdácska –, Szabolcs (Kanyár) and Ung – Nagykapos (Veľké Kapušany), Kiskapos, Sislóc, Lakárd (Lekárovce), Trask, Szalóka and Viszoka (Vysoká nad Kysucou) – counties to the newly established convent continuously since the early 1190s, which acts were confirmed by Andrew II in a single document, in accordance with contemporary tradition to avoid later possible disagreements. The monastery of Lelesz, dedicated to the Holy Cross, was consecrated by Katapán, the Bishop of Eger in 1214. The provostry became one of the most important places of authentication in Northeast Hungary, which operated in this function until the 16th century.

=== Confrontation with King Emeric ===
"[...] It really got to Our ears, that in the first week of the past Lent, on the Wednesday of Ember days [10 March 1199], in the evening gloom, when Our Reverend Brother, [Boleslaus], the Bishop of Vác sang Compline with his fellow canons, you [Emeric], arriving to the Vác Cathedral, ordered them to hand over the keys of the sanctuary to you and the bishop [Boleslaus] leave the church [cathedral]; and when he was afraid of the trap set against him, as it gave rise to very strong suspicion for the [late] hour, he was reluctant to obey the royal command, you ordered: the gate of the sanctuary shall be broken by force; and when this bishop and the canons, for this reason, turned to the Lord and began to sing amid tears: »O Lord, look down from thine holy house, and consider us: bow down thine ear, O Lord, to hear us.« [Bar. 2,16], you took amiss that they were begging for divine help, and rushed at the bishop, dragging him down from the top staircase, which is in front of the altar, all the way to the floor paving by force, and the bishop, throwing down to the floor, was handed over to your no less violent [soldiers] in order to drag out from the church [cathedral]. So after you forcibly threw him out of the church [cathedral], and you left him half-dead and thereafter, you ordered to crack the lock of the treasury, seize the treasures of the church [cathedral] and confiscate of your own free will the patrimony of this bishop, who graciously donated it to a certain monastic house he newly founded [Lelesz Provostry]. Thereafter, when this bishop forbade the performance of worship services in the cathedral humiliated in this way, you refused to pay tithe [to his diocese], and under threat of penalty of blinding, you forbade his envoys to attempt to leave the kingdom, preventing their complaint from reaching the Apostolic See. [...]"

— Pope Innocent III's letter to Emeric, King of Hungary on 21 June 1199

"[...] Because Your Holiness have supreme power and authority after God [...], We will reveal to Your Highness the injustices committed against Our Majesty by some disingenuous [...] prelates, who stirred up Our brother [Andrew] [...] against Us. Among them, [Bishops] Boleslaus, Elvin and John of Veszprém stand out from the rest in terms of their perfidy, [they] raged more fiercely and more openly against Us. One of them, Bishop [Boleslaus] of Vác, ahead of Our grounded complaint on violation of Our person, lied that [..., see above], in a false way, of course. Since, the said bishop was caught many times in the sin of betrayal, and we were informed [the following] on the part of his owns [prelates]: letters written for the purpose of causing confusion against Us, which were sent by Our brother and other unfaithful ones, or their reply letters from the bishop himself; in addition he [Boleslaus] keeps the money collected for Our brother. Investigating the truth of these things, We go to the church of Vác along with Our courtiers. [...] We peacefully asked to open the chamber [treasury] which was said to have hidden the treasure of the unfaithful. After [Boleslaus] did not comply with Our request, greater suspicion arose within Us. That is why We strongly warned him to open the chamber to overcome the suspicion of infidelity. [...] Not only did he refuse to open the chamber, but he even offended Our Royal Majesty with a number of insults and blasphemous words, insomuch he even called Us an evildoer. After that, We instructed the treasurer to open the chamber; leaving the treasures of the church completely intact in the presence of the canons, We found the letters written for Our peril and took them to Ourselves, and sent to you by the couriers of the present letter. [...]"

— King Emeric's reply letter to Pope Innocent III

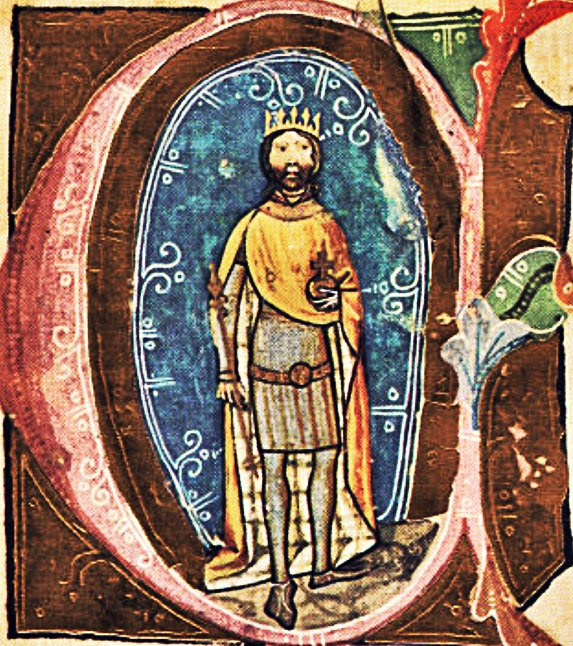
Emeric, King of Hungary, depicted in the Illuminated Chronicle

Following the death of Béla III on 23 April 1196, his elder son Emeric succeeded him on the Hungarian throne. Emeric's whole reign was characterized by his struggles for the supreme power against his rebellious younger brother, Duke Andrew, who used the funds that he inherited from his father to recruit supporters among the Hungarian lords (for instance, Palatine Mog and Ban Nicholas), instead of leading a crusade to the Holy Land in accordance with his vow on Béla's deathbed. As Emeric suspected, Boleslaus and his brother, Elvin were leading partisans of Andrew, who supported his efforts, alongside other prelates, for instance John, the Bishop of Veszprém and Kalán Bár-Kalán, while other bishops (for instance, Saul Győr, Ugrin Csák and Dominic, Bishop of Zagreb) were considered royalists. According to Emeric's accusation, Boleslaus played an important role in organizing the plot against his rule. The king narrated in his letter to Pope Innocent III that the bishop maintained relationship and corresponded with Duke Andrew and the other conspirators, and guarded their group's funds at the cathedral of Vác in order to finance their rebellion against Emeric.

The confrontation between Emeric and Boleslaus reached its peak on 10 March 1199. According to Boleslaus' complaint to the Roman Curia, while the bishop and his canons celebrated a mass at the cathedral of Vác, Emeric and his soldiers violently broke into the building. The king himself physically assaulted Boleslaus, while his troops broke the lock, looted the treasury and confiscated numerous documents, which allegedly contained the preparations for a planned conspiracy against the monarch. According to historian Géza Érszegi, the first version of Boleslaus' will and testament was lost during this act. As Boleslaus' envoys were forbidden to leave the Kingdom of Hungary, his brother Elvin departed to the Holy See to file a formal complaint against the king (alongside his own conflict with his cathedral chapter). In order to finance his journey, Elvin sold his palace and the surrounding lands at Micske in Bihar County (present-day Mișca in Romania). Pope Innocent sent a letter to Emeric on 21 June 1199, in which he called on the king to reimburse the material damage to the cathedral and to compensate Boleslaus, unless he will impose an ecclesiastical penalty on Emeric (excommunication) and the kingdom (interdict). On the same day, Pope Innocent instructed Saul Győr, the Archbishop of Kalocsa to investigate the events and oversee that the king is carrying out the compensation. Initially, Emeric prevented the visitation of Saul to the royal court, hindering his mission. Emeric denied any physical abuse in his reply letter, according to him, the canons of the cathedral chapter voluntarily opened the gate, and Boleslaus' involvement in the conspiracy was revealed. Since after the incident and the subsequent civil war, several barons defected to the court of Duke Andrew, it is plausible the king had good reason to open the cathedral treasury, according to historian György Szabados.

In accordance with the contemporary records, Boleslaus no longer played an active role in the rebellion of Duke Andrew during the remaining regnal years of King Emeric. Boleslaus was granted tax exemption from the king as a compensation; the king usually collected extraordinary taxes at Christmas, Easter, and St. Stephen's Day (20 August) each year, which he refrained from collecting in the Diocese of Vác. The bishop also acquired Szalonta and its fair in the same period from Ruthenian merchants. Boleslaus was a strong confidant of Pope Innocent, who entrusted him with participation in several ecclesiastical lawsuits. He mediated in the dispute between Kalán Bár-Kalán and the Benedictine Abbey of Földvár over the right of jurisdiction in 1199. He was also a member of that ecclesiastical court, which investigated the dispute between the archiepiscopal sees of Esztergom and Kalocsa for the supremacy in the Hungarian church hierarchy in 1203. Alongside other suffragans, Boleslaus strongly opposed the election of John as Archbishop of Esztergom in the summer of 1204.

=== Last years ===
Boleslaus regained his influence at the royal court, when Andrew II ascended the Hungarian throne in May 1205. Boleslaus received the privilege to baptize Andrew's firstborn son Béla, future King of Hungary, in 1206, which indicates the close alliance between him and the monarch. As a christening gift, the infant Béla was granted the right of patronage over the Lelesz monastery by Boleslaus. In addition, the bishop also donated some of his lands to the provostry, including Hagymás – which he previously bought from Mercurius, a former Ban of Slavonia –, Kisgéres, Fancsal and Királyhelmec. Andrew II handed over two salt-carrying ferries along the river Maros (Mureș) and two portions of salt income at Dés (present-day Dej, Romania) to Boleslaus, who also granted tax exemption at delivery in every Pentecost.

Boleslaus last appeared as a living person in a contemporary document in 1212. He was succeeded by James in the upcoming year. Andrew II, on his journey for a new campaign against Galicia in summer 1213, resided in Lelesz, when he was informed of the murder of his wife, Queen Gertrude. Andrew buried a part of his wife's body there and donated the other half portion of Micske to the monastery, previously owned by Boleslaus' nephew, comes Othmar, who lost the estate because of his disloyalty.

== Sources ==
- Érszegi, Géza (2003). "A leleszi monostor alapítóleveléről (1214) [The Establishing Charter of the Monastery of Lelesz (1214)]". In Henzsel, Ágota (ed.). Szabolcs-Szatmár-Beregi Levéltári Évkönyv XVI (in Hungarian). Szabolcs-Szatmár-Bereg Megyei Levéltár. pp. 13–28. ISSN 0866-0530.
- Galla, Ferenc (1970). "A váci egyházmegye püspökei [The Bishops of the Diocese of Vác]". In Bánk, József (ed.). Váci egyházmegyei almanach Szent István millénium évében (in Hungarian). Roman Catholic Diocese of Vác. pp. 103–201.
- Kovács, Viktória (2017). "Lelesz patrónusai [The Patrons of Lelesz]". Történelmi Szemle (in Hungarian). 59 (1). Hungarian Academy of Sciences: 103–127. ISSN 0040-9634.
- Kubinyi, András (1975). "Királyi kancellária és udvari kápolna Magyarországon a XII. század közepén [Royal Chancery and Court Chapel in Hungary in the Middle of the 12th Century]". Levéltári Közlemények (in Hungarian). 46 (1). National Archives of Hungary: 59–121. ISSN 0024-1512.
- Szabados, György (1999). "Imre és András [Emeric and Andrew]". Századok (in Hungarian). 133 (1). Magyar Történelmi Társulat: 85–111. ISSN 0039-8098.
- Thoroczkay, Gábor, ed. (2018). Írott források az 1116–1205 közötti magyar történelemről [Written Sources of the Hungarian History between 1116 and 1205] (in Hungarian). Szegedi Középkorász Műhely. ISBN 978-615-80398-3-3.
- Zsoldos, Attila (2011). Magyarország világi archontológiája, 1000–1301 [Secular Archontology of Hungary, 1000–1301] (in Hungarian). História, MTA Történettudományi Intézete. ISBN 978-963-9627-38-3.

Catholic Church titles
| Preceded by Job | Bishop of Vác; 1193–1212 | Succeeded by James |
