= Ugrin Csák (archbishop of Esztergom) =

Hungarian prelate

- Archbishop-elect of Esztergom
- See: Esztergom
- Appointed: 1204
- Term ended: 1204
- Predecessor: Job
- Successor: Kalán Bár-Kalán elected
- Other posts: Bishop of Zagreb (?); Bishop of Győr

Personal details
- Died: 1204 Esztergom
- Buried: Esztergom
- Parents: comes Ugrin (?)

Ugrin from the kindred Csák (Hungarian: Csák nembeli Ugrin; died 1204) was a Hungarian prelate at the turn of the 12th and 13th centuries, who served as Bishop of Győr from 1188 to 1204, then briefly Archbishop-elect of Esztergom in 1204.

== Family ==
Ugrin was born into the gens (clan) Csák. According to the Gesta Hunnorum et Hungarorum ("Deeds of the Huns and Hungarians"), the ancestor of the kindred was Szabolcs, son of chieftain Előd, the leader of one of the seven Magyar tribes, who participated in the Hungarian conquest of the Carpathian Basin in the late 9th century. Accordingly, Szabolcs' grandson was Csák, founder of the namesake clan and contemporary of Grand Prince Géza, then King Stephen I. Historian Gyula Kristó proposed that Ugrin was presumably the son of that comes Ugrin, who owned the Vértesszentkereszt Abbey in the Vértes Hills in 1146. Historian Pál Engel considered, Ugrin belonged to the Kisfalud branch of the gens Csák. In his last will and testament in 1231, Nicholas Csák, who served as ispán of various counties in the first half of the 13th century, referred to Ugrin as his frater, literally "brother", but it most likely means "uncle" in this context.

== Prelate ==
A non-authentic charter styled him Bishop-elect of Zagreb in 1175, when Prodanus held the dignity in that period. Historian Attila Zsoldos analyzed the document in detail and revealed the contradictions between archontological data, which still exist despite that historiographical efforts which tried to correct the charter's date to 1183 or 1185. The forgery, which was written in the name of King Béla III, incorrectly refers to Prodanus as a deceased person, while other dates are incompatible with each other. Thus Ugrin's role as Bishop of Zagreb can not be proven.

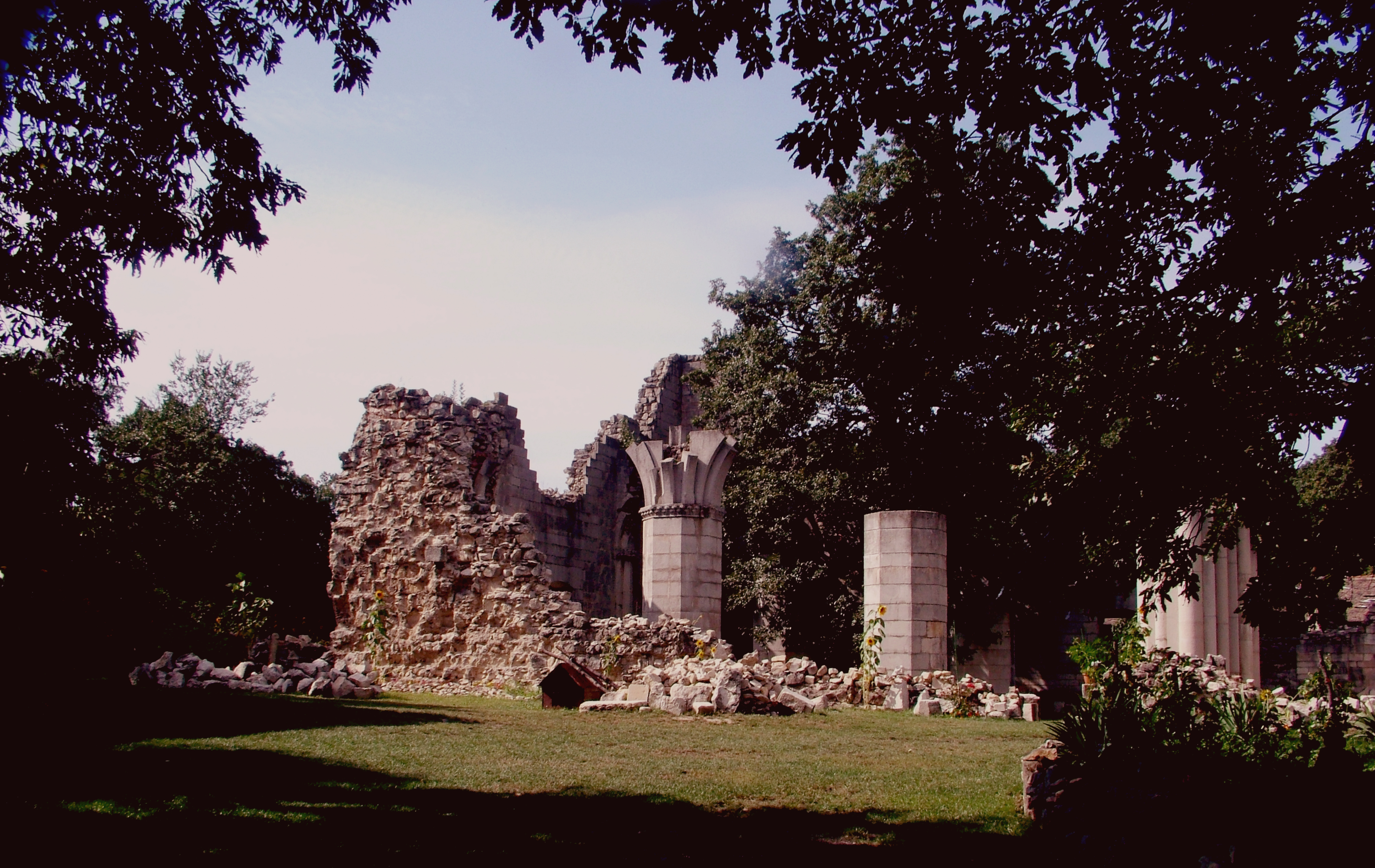
The ruins of Vértesszentkereszt Abbey

From 1188 (according to authentic charters only from 1192), Ugrin served as Bishop of Győr. In the summer of 1189, German crusaders marched through Hungary under the command of Frederick I, Holy Roman Emperor. Béla III welcomed Frederick in Esztergom, and dispatched a troop of 2,000 soldiers led by Ugrin Csák to escort the crusaders across the Balkan Peninsula. At Frederick's request, Béla released his imprisoned brother, Géza, who joined the crusaders and left Hungary. In November, Béla countermanded Ugrin and his Hungarian crusaders from Niš, because he did not want to confront with his son-in-law, Emperor Isaac II Angelos, while Géza and his small escort remained in the crusader army. Consequently, Ugrin and six ispáns returned to Hungary. As bishop, Ugrin significantly expanded and rebuilt the monastery of Vértesszentkereszt. He hired church architects from Esztergom and Kalocsa to renovate and expand its walls and plinth, combining the Romanesque and Gothic art elements.

After the death of Béla III, Ugrin was the staunchest supporter of his successor Emeric, whose whole reign was characterized by his struggles against his rebellious younger brother, Duke Andrew. Ugrin was the leader of the "royalist party" during the conflicts of the two brothers, according to historian James Ross Sweeney. Pope Celestine III urged Ugrin to stay in the king's faithfulness, when Andrew forced Emeric to make him ruler of Croatia and Dalmatia as appanage. On 30 December 1198, Pope Innocent III ordered Archbishop Saul Győr of Kalocsa, bishops Ugrin Csák of Győr and Dominic of Zagreb to investigate the inauguration of the pro-Andrew archbishops of the Dalmatian dioceses of Split (Spalato) and Zadar (Zára), who were formerly excommunicated by Pope Celestine, but Andrew arbitrarily appointed them to their dignities. At the end of 1199, Emeric called Ugrin as one of his "most loyal prelates" in his letter to Pope Innocent, who sponsored Emeric's efforts and forbade the Hungarian prelates and clergymen to excommunicate the king's supporters, including Ugrin (as some bishops, including Kalán Bár-Kalán and Boleslaus, were partisans of Duke Andrew). Ugrin was granted Mihályi by Emeric in 1198. The village later became seat of the Kisfalud branch and its descendants, the Nagymihályi and Csáki (or Csáky) de Mihály families. In 1201, the king donated the village of Szántó near Bodajk to Ugrin. His all assets were inherited by his nephew (or brother) Nicholas Csák. When Emeric accused, in 1203, Kalán Bár-Kalán not of murdering his father (Béla III) but of maintaining an illicit relationship with his own niece, the skeptic Pope Innocent secretly entrusted Ugrin to investigate the truth of the allegations. Ugrin and five other bishops conducted a process, which cleared Kalán from the charges in early 1204.

Archbishop Job of Esztergom died on 1 February 1204. Emeric, who intended to go on a pilgrimage to the Holy Land, did not want to leave his country in uncertainty. Having fallen seriously ill, Emeric wanted to ensure the succession of his four-year-old son, Ladislaus. The archbishops of Esztergom customary claimed the coronations for themselves. On 24 April 1204, Ugrin was styled as Archbishop-elect of Esztergom by Pope Innocent. He is the first holder of the dignity, whose family relationships and kindred is known. The pope authorized him to crown Ladislaus and to invalidate the ill Emeric's pilgrimage oath. However, Ladislaus III was crowned on 26 August 1204 by John, Archbishop of Kalocsa, which fact suggests that Ugrin died suddenly not long before that date. His red marble tomb was excavated by archaeologists in the 19th century.

== Sources ==
- Bánk, József, ed. (1968). Győregyházmegyei almanach. Schematizmus Dioecesis Jaurinensis [Almanac of the Diocese of Győr] (in Hungarian). Authority of the Diocese of Győr.
- Beke, Margit (2003). "Csák nembeli Ugrin [Ugrin from the kindred Csák]". In Beke, Margit (ed.). Esztergomi érsekek 1001–2003 [Archbishops of Esztergom 1001–2003] (in Hungarian). Szent István Társulat. pp. 81–83. ISBN 963-361-472-4.
- Győri, Éva (2008). "Győri püspökök a XIII. században [The Bishops of Győr in the 13th Century]". Belvedere Meridionale (in Hungarian). 20 (1–2): 24–43. ISSN 1419-0222.
- Kristó, Gyula (1986). Csák Máté [Matthew Csák] (in Hungarian). Gondolat. ISBN 963-281-736-2.
- Sweeney, James Ross (1993). "III. lnce és az esztergomi érsekválasztási vita. (A Bone Memorie II. dekretális történeti háttere) [Pope Innocent III and the Dispute Over the Election of Archbishop of Esztergom. Background to the Papal Decretal of Bone Memorie II]". Aetas (in Hungarian). 8 (1). Translated by Sebők, Ferenc. AETAS Könyv- és Lapkiadó Egyesület: 147–169. ISSN 0237-7934.
- Szabados, György (1999). "Imre és András [Emeric and Andrew]". Századok. 133 (1). Magyar Történelmi Társulat: 85–111. ISSN 0039-8098.
- Zsoldos, Attila (2011). Magyarország világi archontológiája, 1000–1301 [Secular Archontology of Hungary, 1000–1301] (in Hungarian). História, MTA Történettudományi Intézete. ISBN 978-963-9627-38-3.

Ugrin Genus Csák Born: ? Died: 1204
Catholic Church titles
Preceded by Mikod	Bishop of Győr; 1188–1204	Succeeded by Peter
Preceded by Job	Archbishop of Esztergom elected 1204	Succeeded by Kalán Bár-Kalán elected
