= Elvin (bishop of Várad) =

Hungarian prelate

- Bishop of Várad
- Installed: 1189
- Term ended: 1200
- Predecessor: Vata
- Successor: Simon

Personal details
- Died: after 1200
- Denomination: Roman Catholic
- Education: University of Paris

Elvin (also Elvinus; died after 1200) was a Hungarian prelate in the late 12th century, who served as Bishop of Várad (present-day Oradea, Romania) from 1189 to 1200.

== Background ==
Elvin was born into a wealthy and prominent family, but his parentage and origin is unknown. He had a brother (or at least, relative; frater) Boleslaus, also a prelate, who served as Bishop of Vác from 1193 to 1212. They also had another unidentified brother, the father of certain Othmar and Marhard. Based on the geographical location of their landholdings, historian Vince Bunyitay considered that both of them belonged to the gens (clan) Becsegergely. Early 19th-century historian János Bárdosy claimed both Boleslaus and Elvin were the sons of Both (also Bot or Bat), the ispán of Bihar County. Elvin possessed estates around the episcopal see Várad. He had a palace in Micske in Bihar County (today part of Chișlaz, Romania). He also possessed five vineyards in Bihar (present-day Biharia, Romania) and several villages along the river White Körös (Fehér-Körös or Crișul Alb).

King Béla III of Hungary sent Elvin to the University of Paris to study church music (melody or sequence) in 1192. László Solymosi questioned the identification between the prelate and the student, since in 12th century Hungary it was unusual for reigning bishops to be sent abroad to study; the clerics studying in Paris became suffragans after their return, as there are several examples from this time, for instance Lucas, Job and Adrian. Archivist György Pray recorded the diploma (which has since disappeared) from memory in a letter in 1779, so it is possible that the year is wrong and that Elvin studied in Paris sometime before 1189. This data was utilized by French music historian and composer Jean-Benjamin de La Borde in his work Essai sur la musique ancienne et moderne (vol. 1) in 1780.

== Bishop ==
"[...] Because Your Holiness have supreme power and authority after God [...], We will reveal to Your Highness the injustices committed against Our Majesty by some disingenuous [...] prelates, who stirred up Our brother [Andrew] [...] against Us. Among them, [Bishops] Boleslaus, Elvin and John of Veszprém stand out from the rest in terms of their perfidy, [they] raged more fiercely and more openly against Us. [...] Elvin of Várad, the brother of this bishop [Boleslaus], whose life it is not necessary to give an abominable account, seeing that Count Palatine [Mog], by whom these [the conspirators] weapons had excited the fury of our destruction, was stripped of his dignities by Us because of his apparent disloyalty, and because of his outstanding loyalty, we wanted to replace him with Count Michael [Mika Ják], to prevent our intention, he [Elvin] declared the same Count Michael to be excommunicated, accusing him of this because, as he claimed, he imprisoned a certain ecclesiastic, who was not even in his county [Bihar], but was captured by the [royal] doorkeepers along with the [aforementioned] bishops' letters. And the same Count was neither summoned nor reprimanded, he did not have the opportunity to testify."

— King Emeric's letter to Pope Innocent III (1199)

According to the list of bishops by the cathedral chapter of Várad, Elvin was elected Bishop of Várad in 1189, succeeding Vata. During his episcopate, King Ladislaus I of Hungary – whose corpse laid in the cathedral of Várad – was canonized by Pope Celestine III in 1192, at the initiative of Béla III with the support of Job, Archbishop of Esztergom and Elvin. Prior to that, Cardinal Gregorius de Crescentio and other legal scholars visited the diocese in order to investigate the miracles of Ladislaus' tomb in 1191. Several months of solemn ceremony took place in the diocese during 1192. Literary historian László Dobszay considered the subsequent official hymn of St. Ladislaus with French influence reflects the studies of Elvin in Paris. After the exhumation, Elvin donated pieces of the relic to several churches, for instance to the newly founded collegiate chapter of Szeben (present-day Sibiu, Romania).

Following the death of Béla III, his eldest son Emeric ascended the Hungarian throne in 1196. Upon Elvin's request, Emeric confirmed the diocese's right of possession over the castle of Bihar and the river duty at Körös in 1198. The monarch also donated additional estates to the diocese. Elvin was involved in a conflict with his cathedral chapter. According to the complaint, Elvin deprived several canons from their offices in mid-1197, including the provost and the cantor. Accusing Elvin with oath-breaking and simony, the plaintiffs appeared in person before the metropolitan archbishop Saul Győr of Kalocsa, who ruled in favor of them since Elvin omitted to present before his court. Saul instructed Elvin to compensate the canons and reinstate them to their positions. Elvin appealed against the archbishop's verdict. The case became a marginal chapter in the conflict between Emeric and Duke Andrew. Saul Győr excommunicated Elvin in 1198, because he did not carry out the sentence and unlawfully he did not reinstate the canons to their positions. Elvin appeared before the archbishop, admitted his offense and asked for absolution. Saul Győr set conditions to suspend Elvin's excommunication: Elvin had to admit that he had committed the offense in a letter with his own seal and the archbishop required his compulsory pilgrimage to the Roman Curia to exercise penance by the deadline 8 September 1198 too. After Elvin met the request, Saul lifted the excommunication. Pope Innocent III warned Elvin in his letter with the date 18 July 1198, not to forget to come to Rome. King Emeric strongly opposed Saul's decision, but the archbishop wished to keep the secular sphere out of church affairs. As Elvin continued to delay the execution of the judgment, the canons also appeared before the Curia. Pope Innocent decided that the case should be reheard in Hungary. In February 1199, the pope ordered Job, Archbishop of Esztergom, Gerardo Offreducci da Marostica, Bishop of Padua and John, Bishop of Csanád to investigate charges of simony against Elvin.

Despite Emeric's aforementioned donations, Boleslaus and Elvin, by the year 1199, were considered staunch supporters of Duke Andrew, who struggled for the Hungarian throne against his elder brother Emeric. The two bishops, along with other lords and prelates, were involved in a conspiracy against the king, which, however, was uncovered in March 1199, when Emeric and his soldiers arrived to the Vác Cathedral and forced Boleslaus to give him documents that proved the conspiracy against him. As Boleslaus' envoys were forbidden to leave Hungary, his brother Elvin departed to the Holy See to file a formal complaint against the king (alongside his own conflict with his cathedral chapter). In order to finance his journey, Elvin sold his palace and the surrounding lands at Micske, in addition to his five vineyards, in Bihar County to his brother for 400 marks. Pope Innocent III sent a letter to Emeric on 21 June 1199, which reflects Elvin's report. Accordingly, Emeric and his soldiers violently broke into the cathedral. The king himself physically assaulted Boleslaus, while his troops broke the lock, looted the treasury and confiscated the privilege letters of the diocese. Pope Innocent entrusted Saul Győr, the Archbishop of Kalocsa to investigate the conflict, but Emeric hindered his activity by preventing his visitation to the royal court.

Emeric sent a reply letter to the pope shortly after. He denied any physical abuse and narrated that Boleslaus and Elvin, in addition to John, Bishop of Veszprém were leading prelates of Andrew's conspiracy against him. Emeric narrated that, when he dismissed Mog – who betrayed him and defected to the court of Duke Andrew – from the position of Palatine of Hungary and attempted to install his partisan Mika Ják in his place, Elvin, using the ecclesiastical censure as political weapon, excommunicated the lord, because he had formerly captured one of the bishopric's clergymen, who functioned as a messenger of the king's enemies who supported Duke Andrew. In addition, Emeric also claimed that the neglect of Saul Győr was due to the safety of the archbishop, whose lives would have been endangered by the adherents of Elvin. Elvin's bishopric lasted until 1200, according to the cathedral chapter's list of bishops. He was succeeded by Simon, who is first mentioned in this capacity in 1202. Historian Géza Érszegi considered Elvin's disappearance after 1200 was a result of the attempt of Pope Innocent's mediation between Emeric and Andrew.

== Sources ==
- Bunyitay, Vince (1883). A váradi püspökség története alapításától a jelenkorig [A History of the Diocese of Várad from the Foundation until Present] (in Hungarian).
- Érszegi, Géza (2003). "A leleszi monostor alapítóleveléről (1214) [The Establishing Charter of the Monastery of Lelesz (1214)]". In Henzsel, Ágota (ed.). Szabolcs-Szatmár-Beregi Levéltári Évkönyv XVI (in Hungarian). Szabolcs-Szatmár-Bereg Megyei Levéltár. pp. 13–28. ISSN 0866-0530.
- Haraszti Szabó, Péter; Kelényi, Borbála (2019). Magyarországi diákok francia, angol, itáliai és német egyetemeken a középkorban, 1100–1526 [Students from Hungary at the Universities of France, England, Italy and Germany in the Middle Ages 1100–1526] (in Hungarian). ELTE Egyetemi Könyvtár és Levéltár; MTA ELTE Egyetemtörténeti Kutatócsoport. ISBN 978-963-489-098-0.
- Solymosi, László (2021). Szent László király sírja, kultusza és szentté avatása [The Tomb, Cult and Canonization of King Saint Ladislaus] (in Hungarian). Hungarian Academy of Sciences. ISBN 978-963-508-982-6.
- Thoroczkay, Gábor, ed. (2018). Írott források az 1116–1205 közötti magyar történelemről [Written Sources of the Hungarian History between 1116 and 1205] (in Hungarian). Szegedi Középkorász Műhely. ISBN 978-615-80398-3-3.
- Udvardy, József (1991). A kalocsai érsekek életrajza (1000–1526) [Biographies of Archbishops of Kalocsa, 1000–1526] (in Hungarian). Görres Gesellschaft.
- Zsoldos, Attila (2011). Magyarország világi archontológiája, 1000–1301 [Secular Archontology of Hungary, 1000–1301] (in Hungarian). História, MTA Történettudományi Intézete. ISBN 978-963-9627-38-3.

Catholic Church titles
Preceded by Vata	Bishop of Várad; 1189–1200	Succeeded by Simon
