= James (bishop of Vác) =

Hungarian prelate

- Bishop of Vác
- Installed: 1213
- Term ended: 1221
- Predecessor: Boleslaus
- Successor: Briccius

Personal details
- Died: 1221
- Denomination: Catholic

James (Hungarian: Jakab; died 1221) was a Hungarian prelate in the early 13th century, who served as Bishop of Vác from 1213 to 1221, during the reign of Andrew II of Hungary.

== Career ==
Earlier historiography incorrectly considered that James studied at the Abbey of St Genevieve in Paris, misspelling Job's name to Jacobus (James).

James entered the service of Duke Andrew, who – opposing his brother Emeric's reign – established a sovereign rule in Croatia and Dalmatia at the turn of the 12th and 13th centuries. Beside his position of provost of Zagreb, James functioned as chancellor of the ducal court from 1200 to 1202, when Emeric was forced to acknowledge his brother's territorial claims. Because of his titles "magister ducius et cancellarius" and "prepositi magistri nostri et cancellarii", there are assumptions that James was one of the tutors of the young Andrew prior to that. James was made provost of Kalocsa by 1211. In this capacity, he assisted the work of Archbishop Berthold (King Andrew's brother-in-law) who had "incomplete knowledge". Thereafter, he served as vicar of the elderly Boleslaus, Bishop of Vác.

James was elected bishop of Vác in 1213, succeeding Boleslaus. In May 1218, Pope Honorius III launched an investigation against James, who, according to the accusations, lived a luxurious life, neglected the duties of his office, irresponsibly managed the bishopric's assets and allowed the buildings of the diocese to fall into disrepair. James allegedly did not shy away from violence when he harmed the priests and abused the censure of excommunication against his critics. Pope Honorius ordered Bishop Robert of Veszprém and the abbots of Zirc and Pilis to investigate the accusations. Although the outcome of the investigation is unknown, James held the bishopric until his death in 1221.

== Sources ==
- Barabás, Gábor (2023). Delegated Papal Jurisdiction in Arpadian Hungary. Bishops – provosts – papal chaplains. Arpadiana XVI., Research Centre for the Humanities. ISBN 978-963-416-405-0.
- C. Tóth, Norbert (2019). A kalocsa-bácsi főegyházmegye káptalanjainak középkori archontológiája [Medieval Archontology of the Chapters of the Archdiocese of Kalocsa–Bács] (in Hungarian). Kalocsai Főegyházmegyei Levéltár. ISBN 978-615-5940-01-9.
- Galla, Ferenc (1970). "A váci egyházmegye püspökei [The Bishops of the Diocese of Vác]". In Bánk, József (ed.). Váci egyházmegyei almanach Szent István millénium évében (in Hungarian). Roman Catholic Diocese of Vác. pp. 103–201.
- Juhász, Csaba (2019). "Zágrábi arengák és narratiók a 13. század első feléből [Harangue and Narrations from the Diocese of Zagreb in the first half of the 13th century]". Magyar Könyvszemle (in Hungarian). 135 (3): 279–306. doi:10.17167/mksz.2019.3.279-306. hdl:10831/47054. ISSN 0025-0171. S2CID 239539789.
- Zsoldos, Attila (2011). Magyarország világi archontológiája, 1000–1301 [Secular Archontology of Hungary, 1000–1301] (in Hungarian). História, MTA Történettudományi Intézete. ISBN 978-963-9627-38-3.

Catholic Church titles
Preceded by Boleslaus	Bishop of Vác; 1213–1221	Succeeded by Briccius
