= Dominic (bishop of Zagreb) =

Prelate and bishop of Zagreb

- Bishop of Zagreb
- Appointed: 1193
- Term ended: 1201
- Predecessor: Crispin
- Successor: Gotthard

Personal details
- Died: 1201/05
- Buried: Zagreb Cathedral

Dominic (Croatian: Dominik, Hungarian: Domokos or Domonkos; died between 1201 and 1205) was a prelate at the turn of the 12th and 13th centuries, who served as Bishop of Zagreb from around 1193 to 1201.

== Bishop of Zagreb ==
=== First years ===
Dominic was first referred to as Bishop of Zagreb in 1193. As a certain Crispin appeared in this dignity in the previous year, Dominic was elected to the office either 1192 or 1193. Dominic is the first Bishop of Zagreb, whose name was frequently mentioned by contemporary records. During his first episcopal years, his authority was weakened by fellow prelate Kalán Bár-Kalán, who also acted as Governor of Dalmatia and Croatia, but Dominic and his bishopric forged an advantage from the situation. Kalán took measures in favor of the Diocese of Zagreb in two lawsuits in 1193; he returned the land Kemenic to the bishopric against some castle warriors, while the tithes of the settlements Krapina, Okić and Pogoria were assigned to the diocese, instead of the ducal chamber.

=== Balance policy ===
According to Hungarian historian György Szabados and Croatian historian Ivan Tkalčić, Dominic was a staunch supporter of Emeric, King of Hungary, whose whole reign was characterized by his struggles for the supreme power against his rebellious younger brother, Duke Andrew. After a brief war, Emeric was forced to make Andrew Duke of Croatia and Dalmatia as an appanage. The pretender also extended his influence over some parts of Slavonia, where the Diocese of Zagreb roughly laid. On 11 May 1198, Andrew acknowledged Dominic's exclusive judicial authority over the local church people of the diocese, regarding altogether "Hungarians, Latins and Slavs". Based on this, the Croatian historiography – including Vjekoslav Klaić – considered Dominic had a strong relationship with Duke Andrew, belonging to his ducal court during that time. Nada Klaić (Vjekoslav's granddaughter) argued Dominic, initially a confidant of Andrew, was forced to swore loyalty to Emeric under the pressure of the Roman Curia.

On 30 December 1198, Pope Innocent III ordered three prelates, Saul Győr, Ugrin Csák and Dominic to investigate the inauguration of the pro-Andrew archbishops of the Dalmatian dioceses of Split (Spalato) and Zadar (Zára), who were formerly excommunicated by Pope Celestine III, but Andrew arbitrarily appointed them to their dignities. Both Archbishop Saul of Kalocsa and (especially) Bishop Ugrin of Győr were considered strong pillars of Emeric's reign, thus Dominic also committed himself to the king by that time, as Szabados emphasized. King Emeric reduced the judicial function of the Ban of Slavonia over the people of the Diocese of Zagreb in favor of their bishop and the cathedral chapter in 1199. Dominic was also granted the right of collection of taxes marturina, prebend and descensus (lodging) in his diocese. During the act of donation, Emeric referred to the bishopric's loyalty to the monarch during the fights with the duke, when it suffered heavy damage under unspecified circumstances. In 1200, Emeric also assigned the tax collection of the estate of Čazma (Csázma) to the Diocese of Zagreb, confirming the privilege letter of Ladislaus I.

Dominic frequently appeared as a testimony in the dignity lists of the royal charters of Emeric in the period between 1199 and 1201. However, the bishop was also mentioned by that charters, which issued in the ducal chancellery of Andrew. In 1200, the duke ruled in favor of Dominic in a lawsuit over the land Graboniza. The bishop's name also occurred in the dignity lists of Duke Andrew's documents, alongside such secular barons, Mog or Nicholas, who were clearly considered as traitors and unfaithful in Emeric's court. Historian Gábor Szeberényi argued, Dominic mostly remained neutral in the conflict between the brothers, and sought to establish a cooperative relationship with both parties for the benefit of the diocese. Upon the request of Dominic in 1201, Emeric recorded and confirmed all acquisitions of the Diocese of Zagreb in a hundred years, since its foundation to their time. The king also donated the river island of Cahianyc at the river Sava. In the same year, Duke Andrew also donated the island to the bishopric, which indicated that Dominic sought to secure the donation from both sides. Szeberényi argued, the pragmatist Dominic saw an opportunity in a precarious political situation in order to increase and secure the privileges and possessions of his diocese, and was not considered a dedicated supporter of either party during his episcopal activity. Dominic was last mentioned in 1201. He died prior to 1205, when his successor Gotthard was first styled as Bishop of Zagreb. He was buried under a red marble slab under the altar of St. Michael in the Zagreb Cathedral.

== Sources ==
- Dobronić, Lelja (1995). "Dominik [Dominic]". In Franko, Mirošević (ed.). Zagrebački biskupi i nadbiskupi [Bishops and Archbishops of Zagreb] (in Croatian). Školska knjiga. pp. 29–31. ISBN 953-0-60597-8.
- Szabados, György (1999). "Imre és András [Emeric and Andrew]". Századok (in Hungarian). 133 (1). Magyar Történelmi Társulat: 85–111. ISSN 0039-8098.
- Szeberényi, Gábor (2003). "Domonkos zágrábi püspök politikai szerepe a 12–13. század fordulóján [The Political Role of Dominic, Bishop of Zagreb at the Turn of the 12th and 13th Centuries]". In Weisz, Boglárka (ed.). Középkortörténti tanulmányok. A III. Medievisztikai PhD-konferencia (Szeged, 2003. május 8–9.) előadásai (in Hungarian). University of Szeged. pp. 159–168. ISBN 978-963-482-664-4.
- Zsoldos, Attila (2011). Magyarország világi archontológiája, 1000–1301 [Secular Archontology of Hungary, 1000–1301] (in Hungarian). História, MTA Történettudományi Intézete. ISBN 978-963-9627-38-3.

Catholic Church titles
Preceded by Crispin	Bishop of Zagreb; 1193–1201	Succeeded by Gotthard
