= Constance, Holy Roman Empress =

Constance, Holy Roman Empress may refer to:

- Constance I of Sicily, empress from 1191 to 1197
- Constance of Aragon, Holy Roman Empress from 1220 to 1222
