= Vata (bishop of Várad) =

Hungarian prelate

- Bishop of Várad
- Installed: 1186
- Term ended: 1189
- Predecessor: John
- Successor: Elvin

Personal details
- Died: 1189
- Denomination: Roman Catholic

Vata (died 1189) was a Hungarian prelate in the second half of the 12th century, who served as Bishop of Várad (present-day Oradea, Romania) from 1186 until his death in 1189.

== Career ==
Vata or Wasca (Hungarian: Vászka) possibly originated from the gens (clan) Miskolc, according to a record by early 19th-century archivist Márton Lendvay.

According to the diocese's list of bishops (Chartularium), Vata was elected Bishop of Várad by the cathedral chapter in 1186. Boleslaus, Bishop of Vác exchanged Árpád in Bihar County (present-day Arpășel, Romania) for the village of Kanyár in Szabolcs County with Lawrence, abbot of Gyulamonostor (today Mănăstirea, Romania) with the approval of Vata, the reigning bishop. The Chartularium mentions that Vata died in 1189, after three years of episcopate. He was succeeded by Elvin in that year.

== Sources ==
- Bunyitay, Vince (1881). "Két feledésbe ment váradi püspök [Two Forgotten Bishops of Várad]". Századok (in Hungarian). 15 (4). Magyar Történelmi Társulat: 332–335. ISSN 0039-8098.
- Érszegi, Géza (2003). "A leleszi monostor alapítóleveléről (1214) [The Establishing Charter of the Monastery of Lelesz (1214)]". In Henzsel, Ágota (ed.). Szabolcs-Szatmár-Beregi Levéltári Évkönyv XVI (in Hungarian). Szabolcs-Szatmár-Bereg Megyei Levéltár. p. 13–28. ISSN 0866-0530.
- Zsoldos, Attila (2011). Magyarország világi archontológiája, 1000–1301 [Secular Archontology of Hungary, 1000–1301] (in Hungarian). História, MTA Történettudományi Intézete. ISBN 978-963-9627-38-3.

Catholic Church titles
Preceded by John	Bishop of Várad; 1186–1189	Succeeded by Elvin
