= Briccius (bishop of Vác) =

Hungarian prelate

- Bishop of Vác
- Installed: 1221
- Term ended: 1236
- Predecessor: James
- Successor: Matthias Rátót

Personal details
- Died: after 1236
- Denomination: Catholic

Briccius (Hungarian: Bereck; died after 1236) was a Hungarian prelate in the 13th century, who served as Bishop of Vác from 1221 to 1236.

== Origin ==
His parentage is unknown. 19th-century church historian Antal Karcsú claimed he was of Italian origin, while Ferenc Chobot argued that he came from the Harkályi (or Salamonvári) family.

== Career ==
Briccius was elected Bishop of Vác in 1221, succeeding James. His name appears among the testimonies in the Golden Bull of 1222. During his episcopal reign of one and a half decades, Briccius received numerous papal commissions on various issues from the Roman Curia, where he was highly regarded and recognized as a "zealous" and "active" bishop. In May 1222, Pope Honorius III entrusted Briccius – together with Thomas of Eger and Alexander of Várad – to mediate between King Andrew II of Hungary and his son Duke Béla whom his father persuaded to separate from his wife, Maria Laskarina. In June 1222, the pope ordered Briccius, alongside the abbot of Egres and the provost of Vác, to investigate the jurisdictional conflict between Raynald of Belleville, Bishop of Transylvania and the Kolozsmonostor Abbey.

In December 1224, together with Bishop Alexander of Várad and Conrad, the provost of Székesfehérvár, Briccius was mandated to investigate of high treason charges against the provost of Esztergom. Together with Cletus Bél, Briccius was entrusted by Pope Honorius in March 1225 to visit the archiepiscopal see of Esztergom and persuade the canons to elect their new archbishop in accordance with the canonical rules of procedure. In addition, Briccius was mandated to judge over various jurisdictional conflicts between ecclesiastical institutions; the lawsuit between the Diocese Veszprém and the parish priest of Pest (January 1225), the royal confiscation of Küszén Abbey (February 1225), the conflict over tithe between Pannonhalma Abbey and the cathedral chapter of Veszprém (July 1226) and the same dispute of the aforementioned Benedictine abbey with the collegiate chapter of Székesfehérvár (August 1227). In August 1235, Pope Gregory IX appointed Briccius alongside four other prelates to monitor the implementation of the Oath of Bereg, i.e. the separation of non-Christians (Jews and Muslims) from Christian settlements. On the same day, Briccius was also given a special task together with the abbot of Mogyoród; an investigation of a royal chaplain. In November 1235, he was again mandated to judge over the tithe lawsuit between Pannonhalma and Székesfehérvár. In January 1236, Pope Gregory assigned Briccius of Vác, James of Nyitra and John of Wildeshausen, Bishop of Bosnia to investigate the Hungarian church's complaints against the late Andrew II.

The name of Bishop Briccius occurs ("+ BRITIVS – EPIS...OP") on a single 13th century imitation of Friesacher pfennigs minted in Hungary. Austrian numismatist Bernhard Koch connected the coin to Briccius of Vác, while Márton Gyöngyössy considered that the coin – can be dated to 1259 or 1260 – was minted by Briccius of Csanád presumably at Szeged. The church of Kosd, dedicated to the newly canonized Elizabeth of Hungary, King Andrew's daughter, was consecrated by Briccius around 1235. Briccius died sometime between 1236 and 1238, when Matthias Rátót succeeded him as bishop.

== Sources ==
- Barabás, Gábor (2023). Delegated Papal Jurisdiction in Arpadian Hungary. Bishops – provosts – papal chaplains. Arpadiana XVI., Research Centre for the Humanities. ISBN 978-963-416-405-0.
- Galla, Ferenc (1970). "A váci egyházmegye püspökei [The Bishops of the Diocese of Vác]". In Bánk, József (ed.). Váci egyházmegyei almanach Szent István millénium évében (in Hungarian). Roman Catholic Diocese of Vác. pp. 103–201.
- Gyöngyössy, Márton (2013). "Bereck püspök dénárja. A váci vagy a szegedi középkori pénzverés emléke? [The Denarius of Bishop Briccius. A Clue to the Medieval Episcopal Coinage at Vác or at Szeged?]". Az Érem (in Hungarian). 69 (2). Magyar Éremgyűjtők Egyesülete: 1–5. ISSN 0133-8005.
- Zsoldos, Attila (2011). Magyarország világi archontológiája, 1000–1301 [Secular Archontology of Hungary, 1000–1301] (in Hungarian). História, MTA Történettudományi Intézete. ISBN 978-963-9627-38-3.

Catholic Church titles
Preceded by James	Bishop of Vác; 1221–1236	Succeeded by Matthias Rátót
