= Nicholas (archbishop of Esztergom) =

Hungarian prelate

- Archbishop of Esztergom
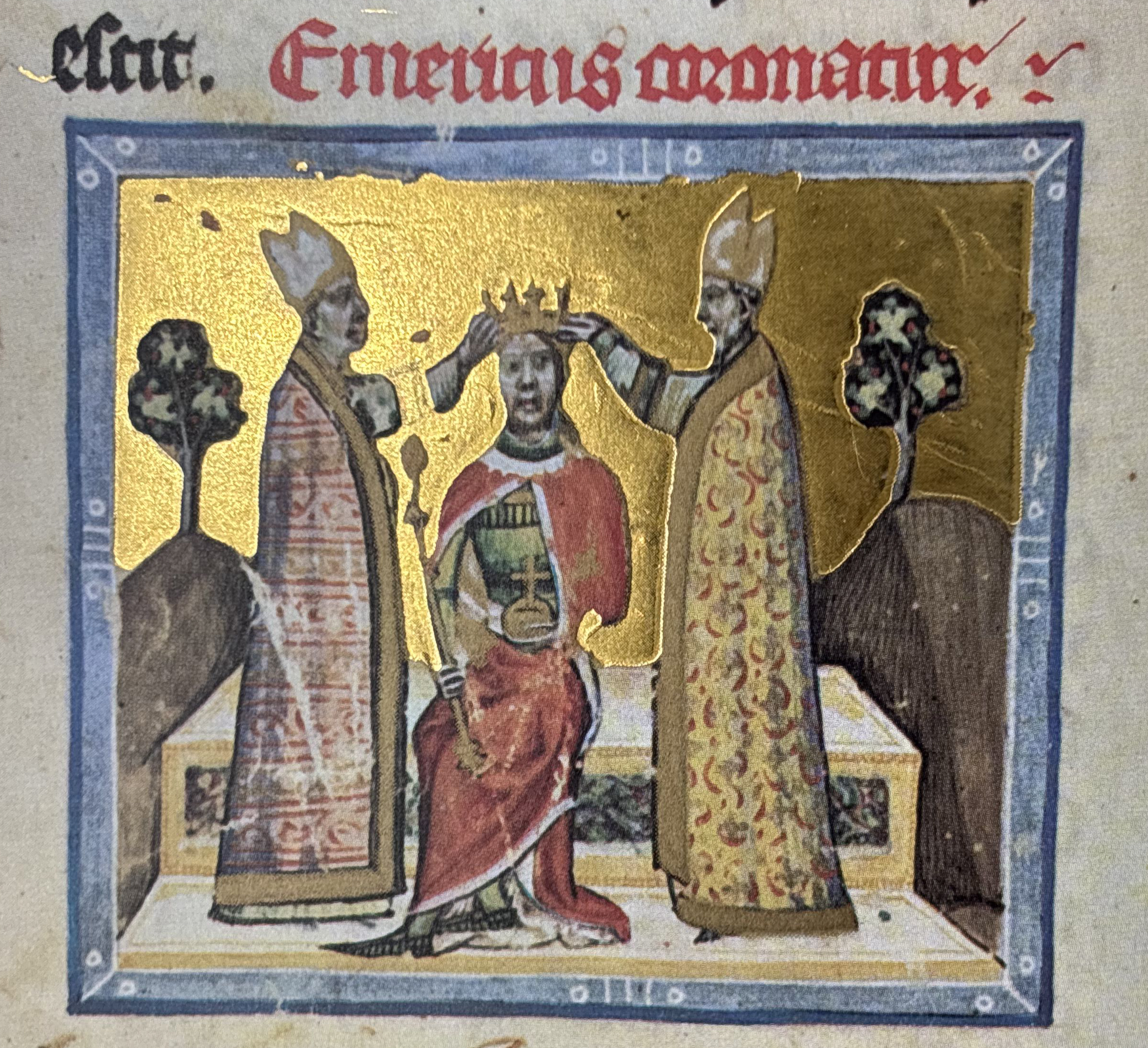
- Nicholas crowns Emeric, depicted in the Illuminated Chronicle
- Installed: 1181
- Term ended: 1183
- Predecessor: Lucas
- Successor: Job
- Other post: Bishop of Várad

Personal details
- Died: 1183 or 1184
- Denomination: Roman Catholic

Nicholas (Hungarian: Miklós) was a 12th-century prelate in the Kingdom of Hungary. He was Archbishop of Esztergom between 1181 and 1183, and Bishop of Várad (now Oradea in Romania) from 1163 to 1181.

== Head of the royal chapel ==
The earliest record of Nicholas – a charter of grant of Géza II of Hungary to the Óbuda Chapter – refers to him as the head of the royal chapel in 1148. He is the first leader of the royal chapel whose name was recorded. The royal chapel was an important office of the royal administration. Being the head of the royal chaplains, Nicholas signed at least four royal charters between 1148 and about 1157. For instance, he appears as the attestor (sigillator) of the last will and testament of lady Margaret in Pannonhalma (an important source of 12th-century Hungarian economic history) in 1152.

He was styled as count (ispán) of the royal chapel (Hungarian: kápolnaispán, Latin: comes capelle) between around 1156 and 1158, when Géza confirmed a land donation to the Garamszentbenedek Abbey (today Hronský Beňadik, Slovakia). In this capacity, Nicholas supervised the convent of the royal chaplains, guarded the royal relic treasures and exercised jurisdiction over those servant laymen, who secured the liturgical activity of the court clergy. Nicholas also served as keeper of the royal seal. In the chancellery, his closest associate was notary Barnabas, canon of Székesfehérvár.

== Prelate ==
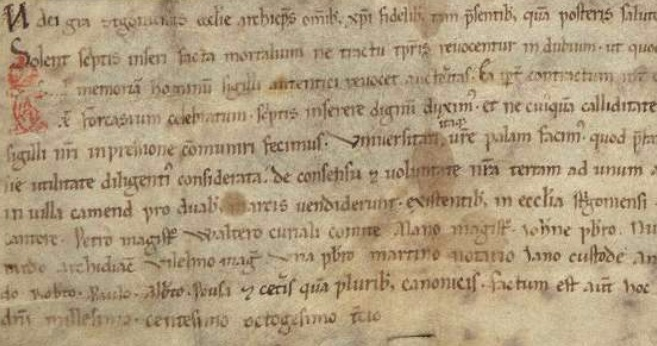
Detail of the 1183 charter of Nicholas, the first self-published such episcopal document in Hungary

Nicholas is mentioned as Bishop of Várad in the only extant royal charter of Géza II's brother, Stephen IV, in 1163. Stephen IV had seized the throne with Byzantine support from Géza II's minor son, Stephen III. The presence of Nicholas among the signatories on Stephen IV's charter evidences that he supported the usurper, along with his superior, Mikó, Archbishop of Kalocsa. A 14th-century (1370s) regulation (statutum) of the cathedral chapter of the Diocese of Várad refers to Nicholas as bishop, "who was head of the Várad Church around the beginning of the reign of Béla III of Hungary" (thus around 1172). This suggests that Nicholas, similarly to other prelates, managed to retain his influence and position after the fall of Stephen IV. Nicholas functioned as Bishop of Várad until no later than 1181. His successor John is mentioned in the bishop list of the Várad Chapter with the year 1180, which was corrected to 1181 by historians Vince Bunyitay and Gábor Thoroczkay.

Nicholas was elected Archbishop of Esztergom following the death of Lucas, the most influential prelate in the 12th-century Hungary. Nicholas first appears as archbishop in a royal document of 1181, when Béla returned fleeing serfs to the Cégény Abbey in accordance with the verdict of Farkas Gatal, Palatine of Hungary. Nicholas crowned the eight-year-old prince Emeric king on 16 May 1182, which confirmed Emeric's right to succeed his father, according to the narration of French chronicler Geoffroy du Breuil. Nicholas is the first archbishop, whose own charter was preserved. Accordingly, the Esztergom Chapter sold a portion of land in Kéménd (present-day Kamenín, Slovakia) to Farkas Gatal for two marks in 1183. The document contains the phrase "sigillum authenticum" (official authentic seal), which guaranteed systematically the contractants' transactions recorded in writing. Pope Alexander III distinguished that type of document from private seals in 1166, beginning with his papal decretals. The permanent royal chancellery also emerged during the brief bishopric of Nicholas. Whether he was a promoter of court reforms, it is not known. Nevertheless, Béla separated the issuance of royal charters from the court clergy with that step after the experience of his long lasting jurisdictional conflicts with the strong-willed Lucas. Nicholas died either in 1183 or 1184, as his successor Job appears as archbishop since 1185.

== Sources ==
- Érszegi, Géza; Solymosi, László (1981). "Az Árpádok királysága, 1000–1301 [The Monarchy of the Árpáds, 1000–1301]". In Solymosi, László (ed.). Magyarország történeti kronológiája, I: a kezdetektől 1526-ig [Historical Chronology of Hungary, Volume I: From the Beginning to 1526] (in Hungarian). Akadémiai Kiadó. pp. 79–187. ISBN 963-05-2661-1.
- Thoroczkay, Gábor (2016). Ismeretlen Árpád-kor: Püspökök, legendák, króniák [The Unknown Age of the Árpáds: Bishops, Legends and Chronicles] (in Hungarian). L'Harmattan. ISBN 978-963-414-212-6.
- Zsoldos, Attila (2011). Magyarország világi archontológiája, 1000–1301 [Secular Archontology of Hungary, 1000–1301] (in Hungarian). História, MTA Történettudományi Intézete. ISBN 978-963-9627-38-3.

Political offices
Preceded by first known	Head of the royal chapel 1148–c. 1158	Succeeded by Suda (?)
Catholic Church titles
Preceded by Michael	Bishop of Várad; 1163–1181	Succeeded by John
Preceded by Lucas	Archbishop of Esztergom; 1181–1183	Succeeded by Job
