= Kalán Bár-Kalán =

Hungarian prelate

- Bishop of Pécs; Archbishop-elect of Esztergom
- See: Pécs
- Appointed: 1186
- Term ended: 1218
- Predecessor: Makar II
- Successor: Bartholomew
- Other post: Ban of Slavonia

Personal details
- Born: 1150s
- Died: 1218

Kalán from the kindred Bár-Kalán (Hungarian: Bár-Kalán nembeli Kalán, Latin: Calanus Coelius or Juvencius Coelius; died late 1218) was a prelate and royal official in the Kingdom of Hungary at the turn of the 12th and 13th centuries. He was bishop of Pécs from 1186 until his death in 1218, and ban of Croatia and Dalmatia between 1193 and 1194, thus he was the first prelate in the kingdom to parallelly held a secular office. Kalán's relationship with the monarch was tense in the reign of King Emeric who accused the bishop of incest but could never prove it. Although a part of the canons of Esztergom elected Kalán as archbishop in 1204, his election was not confirmed by the Holy See. Kalán died when planning to go on a crusade to the Holy Land.

== Life ==
Kalán was born into a prominent family of the Kingdom of Hungary between around 1150 and 1155. The ancestral possessions of his family, the Bár-Kalán kindred were located around Bár in Baranya County, and around Esztergom. Although no information on his early years was recorded, the "refined style of the charters he issued" (László Koszta) point at his studies in foreign schools. Kalán worked for the royal court from the 1180s and promoted the separation of the royal chancellery from the royal chapel, being the latter supervised by the archbishops of Esztergom. A charter of 1181 alludes to him as "chancellor of the royal court" (aule regie cancellarius).

Although he is mentioned as bishop of Pécs in a charter of 1183, its reliability is highly suspectful. Therefore he seems to have become bishop in 1186. The pope also granted him the personal right to wear a pallium similarly to the archbishops. King Béla III of Hungary appointed Kalán to administer Croatia and Dalmatia with the title of governor (gubernator) in 1193. In this office, Kalán was replaced by the king's eldest son, Emeric, which may suggest a strained relationship between the bishop and the monarch. The Cistercian chronicler, Alberic of Trois-Fontaines would even write that Kalán murdered Béla III using a poisoned communion wafer in 1196. All the same, Béla III's successor, Emeric accused, in 1203, the bishop not of murdering his father but of maintaining an illicit relationship with his own niece, but this accusation remained unproven.

Kalán, along with all the other suffragan bishops of the archbishops of Esztergom, protested against the election of Archbishop John of Kalocsa to the see of Esztergom by its canons in 1204. They emphasized that Archbishop John had up to that time disputed the preeminent status of the see of Esztergom within the kingdom. The suffragan bishops convinced some canon in the cathedral chapter of Esztergom to change their mind and to elect Kalán archbishop. Now his opponent accused bishop Kalán of an incestuous relationship with his niece, but the investigation conducted by his five fellow bishops cleared him. All the same, Pope Innocent III decided the conflict over the archbishopric of Esztergom in favor of Kalán's opponent and confirmed John's election on October 5, 1205.

Kalán passionately protected the interests of his diocese. He disputed that the Benedictine abbey of Dunaföldvár was exempt from his jurisdiction and sued its abbot before the pope, but the abbey remained directly submitted to the archbishops of Esztergom. He also submitted a formal complaint against the Cistercian abbey at Cikádor in the 1210s because the buying of vineyards in his diocese by the Cistercians who were exempt from tithe jeopardized his income. Upon his request Pope Innocent III formerly warned the Cistercians to moderate their acquisition of new properties. He seems to have set up the collegiate chapters at Požega (now in Croatia), and a monastery for the Canons Regular at Irig (now in Serbia).

The building of the cathedral at Pécs was finished in his period, around 1200. In short time Kalán established a collegiate chapter dedicated to John the Baptist in front of the western facade of the new church. The cathedral chapter also began functioning as a "place of authentication" (locus credibilis) in Bishop Kalán's time. He was planning to visit the Holy Land, but his age prevented him from joining the crusade King Andrew II of Hungary organized in 1217.

Kalán Bár-Kalán Born: 1150–1155 Died: 1218
Catholic Church titles
Preceded by (?) Makar II	Bishop of Pécs; 1186–1218	Succeeded by Bartholomew
Preceded by Ugrin Csák (elected)	Archbishop of Esztergom; 1204–1205 (elected)	Succeeded by John
Political offices
Preceded by first known	Chancellor; 1181–1183	Succeeded by Adrian
Preceded by Denis as Ban of Slavonia	Governor of Dalmatia and Croatia; 1193–1194	Succeeded by Dominic Miskolc as Ban of Slavonia
