= Ladislaus III of Hungary =

King of Hungary and Croatia from 1204 to 1205

Ladislaus III
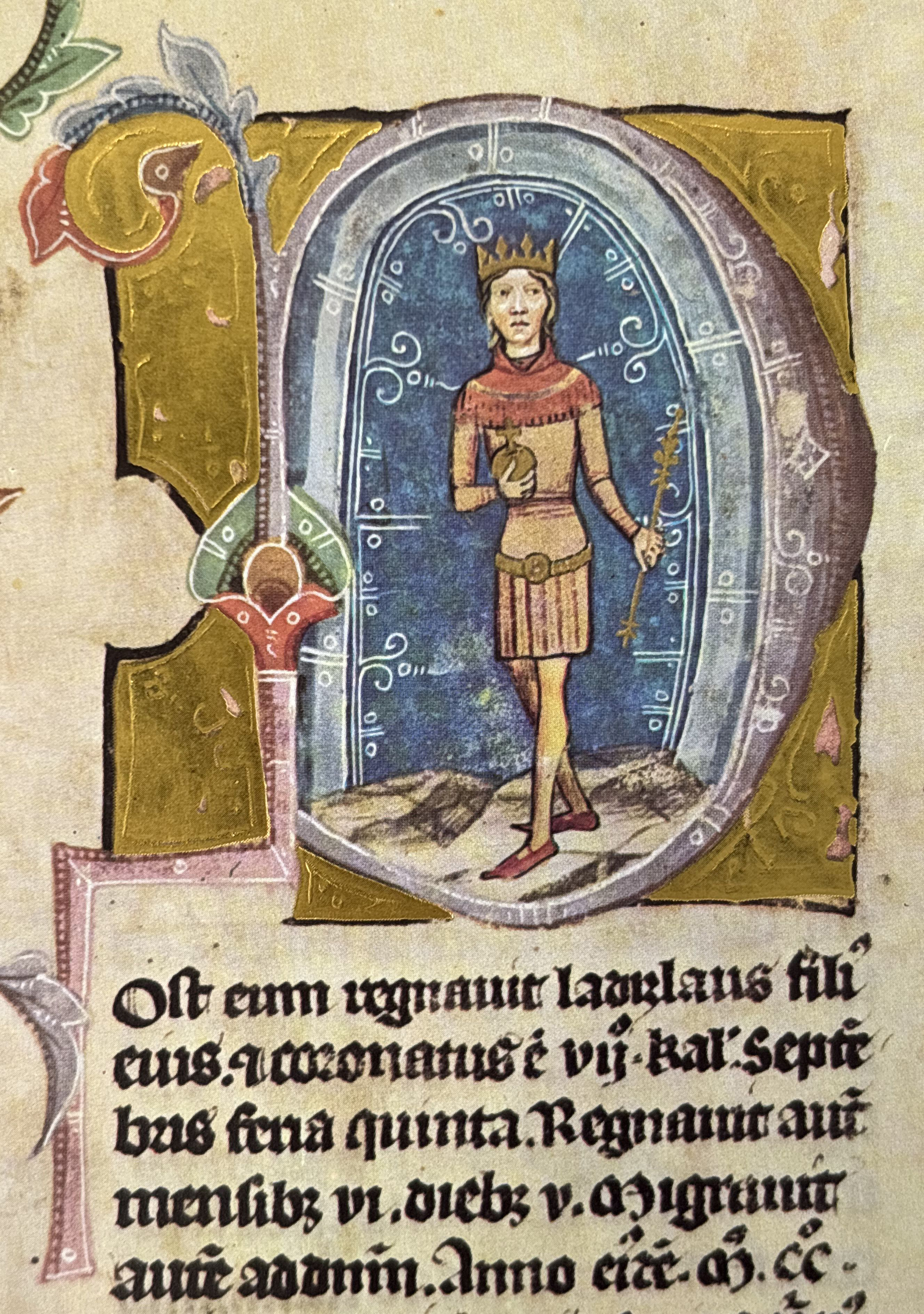
- Ladislaus depicted in the Illuminated Chronicle

King of Hungary and Croatia
- Reign: 30 November 1204 – 7 May 1205
- Coronation: 26 August 1204, Székesfehérvár
- Predecessor: Emeric
- Successor: Andrew II
- Regent: Duke Andrew
- Born: c. 1200
- Died: 7 May 1205 (aged 4–5); Vienna, Duchy of Austria
- Burial: Székesfehérvár Basilica
- Dynasty: Árpád dynasty
- Father: Emeric of Hungary
- Mother: Constance of Aragon
- Religion: Roman Catholic

Ladislaus III (Hungarian: III. László, Croatian: Ladislav III., Slovak: Ladislav III.; c. 1200 – 7 May 1205) was King of Hungary and Croatia between 1204 and 1205. He was the only child of King Emeric. Ladislaus was crowned king upon the orders of his ill father, who wanted to secure his infant son's succession. The dying king made his brother, Andrew, regent for the period of Ladislaus's minority. However, Duke Andrew ignored the child's interests. As a result, Ladislaus's mother, Constance of Aragon, fled to Austria, taking Ladislaus with her. Ladislaus died unexpectedly in Vienna.

== Infancy (c. 1200–1204) ==
Ladislaus was the only known child of King Emeric and his wife, Constance of Aragon. The exact date of Ladislaus's birth is unknown, but it is likely that he was born around 1200, according to historians Gyula Kristó and Ferenc Makk. After falling seriously ill, King Emeric ordered Ladislaus's coronation in an attempt to secure a smooth succession for his infant son. John, Archbishop of Kalocsa, crowned Ladislaus on 26 August 1204. Emeric reconciled with his defiant younger brother, Andrew, whom he had imprisoned. He set Andrew free, and made him regent for the duration of Ladislaus's minority.

King Emeric fell ill with a type of incurable illness. Therefore, when he knew his final hour was approaching, he sent with all haste and had his brother released from custody and brought to him. When Andrew appeared before the king, the king made his will in his presence, entrusting to him the guardianship of his son and the administration of the entire kingdom until the ward should reach the age of majority.

— Thomas the Archdeacon: History of the Bishops of Salona and Split

== Reign (1204–1205) ==
On 30 November 1204, King Emeric died, and Ladislaus succeeded him. Pope Innocent III sent a letter to Duke Andrew, warning him to respect the child king's interests. However, refusing to heed Innocent's warning, Andrew seized the money that Emeric had deposited in the Pilis Abbey for Ladislaus. Considering her son's position to be insecure, Constance fled to Austria, taking Ladislaus with her.

Although Duke Andrew made every effort to capture Queen Constance and King Ladislaus before they could escape, they were able to reach Vienna, Austria. Duke Leopold VI, who was King Emeric's and Duke Andrew's cousin, was willing to give shelter to King Ladislaus, although Duke Andrew threatened him with an invasion. Ladislaus abruptly died on 7 May 1205. His body was carried to Székesfehérvár, and buried in the Székesfehérvár Basilica.

After [King Emeric] reigned his son Ladislaus, who was crowned on August 26, a Thursday. He reigned six months and five days. He departed to the Lord ... on May 7. His body rests at Alba.

— The Hungarian Illuminated Chronicle

== Ancestry ==
Ancestors of Ladislaus III of Hungary

8. Géza II of Hungary
4. Béla III of Hungary
9. Euphrosyne of Kiev
2. Emeric of Hungary
10. Raynald of Châtillon
5. Agnes of Antioch
11. Constance of Antioch
1. Ladislaus III of Hungary
12. Ramon Berenguer IV of Barcelona
6. Alfonso II of Aragon
13. Petronila of Aragon
3. Constance of Aragon
14. Alfonso VII of Castile
7. Sancha of Castile
15. Richeza of Poland

== Sources ==
=== Primary sources ===
- Archdeacon Thomas of Split: History of the Bishops of Salona and Split (Latin text by Olga Perić, edited, translated and annotated by Damir Karbić, Mirjana Matijević Sokol and James Ross Sweeney) (2006). CEU Press. ISBN 963-7326-59-6.
- The Hungarian Illuminated Chronicle: Chronica de Gestis Hungarorum (Edited by Dezső Dercsényi) (1970). Corvina, Taplinger Publishing. ISBN 0-8008-4015-1.

=== Secondary sources ===
- Bartl, Július; Čičaj, Viliam; Kohútova, Mária; Letz, Róbert; Segeš, Vladimír; Škvarna, Dušan (2002). Slovak History: Chronology & Lexicon. Bolchazy-Carducci Publishers, Slovenské Pedegogické Nakladatel'stvo. ISBN 0-86516-444-4.
- Engel, Pál (2001). The Realm of St Stephen: A History of Medieval Hungary, 895–1526. I.B. Tauris Publishers. ISBN 1-86064-061-3.
- Érszegi, Géza; Solymosi, László (1981). "Az Árpádok királysága, 1000–1301 [The Monarchy of the Árpáds, 1000–1301]". In Solymosi, László (ed.). Magyarország történeti kronológiája, I: a kezdetektől 1526-ig [Historical Chronology of Hungary, Volume I: From the Beginning to 1526] (in Hungarian). Akadémiai Kiadó. pp. 79–187. ISBN 963-05-2661-1.
- Kristó, Gyula; Makk, Ferenc (1996). Az Árpád-ház uralkodói [Rulers of the House of Árpád] (in Hungarian). I.P.C. Könyvek. ISBN 963-7930-97-3.
- Runciman, Steven (1989) [1952]. A History of the Crusades, Volume II: The Kingdom of Jerusalem and the Frankish East. Vol. 2. Cambridge: Cambridge University Press. ISBN 0-521-06162-8.

Ladislaus III of Hungary House of Árpád Born: c. 1200 Died: 7 May 1205
Regnal titles
Preceded by Emeric	King of Hungary and Croatia; 1204–1205	Succeeded by Andrew II
