= Job (archbishop of Esztergom) =

Hungarian prelate (c. 1150–1204)

- Archbishop of Esztergom
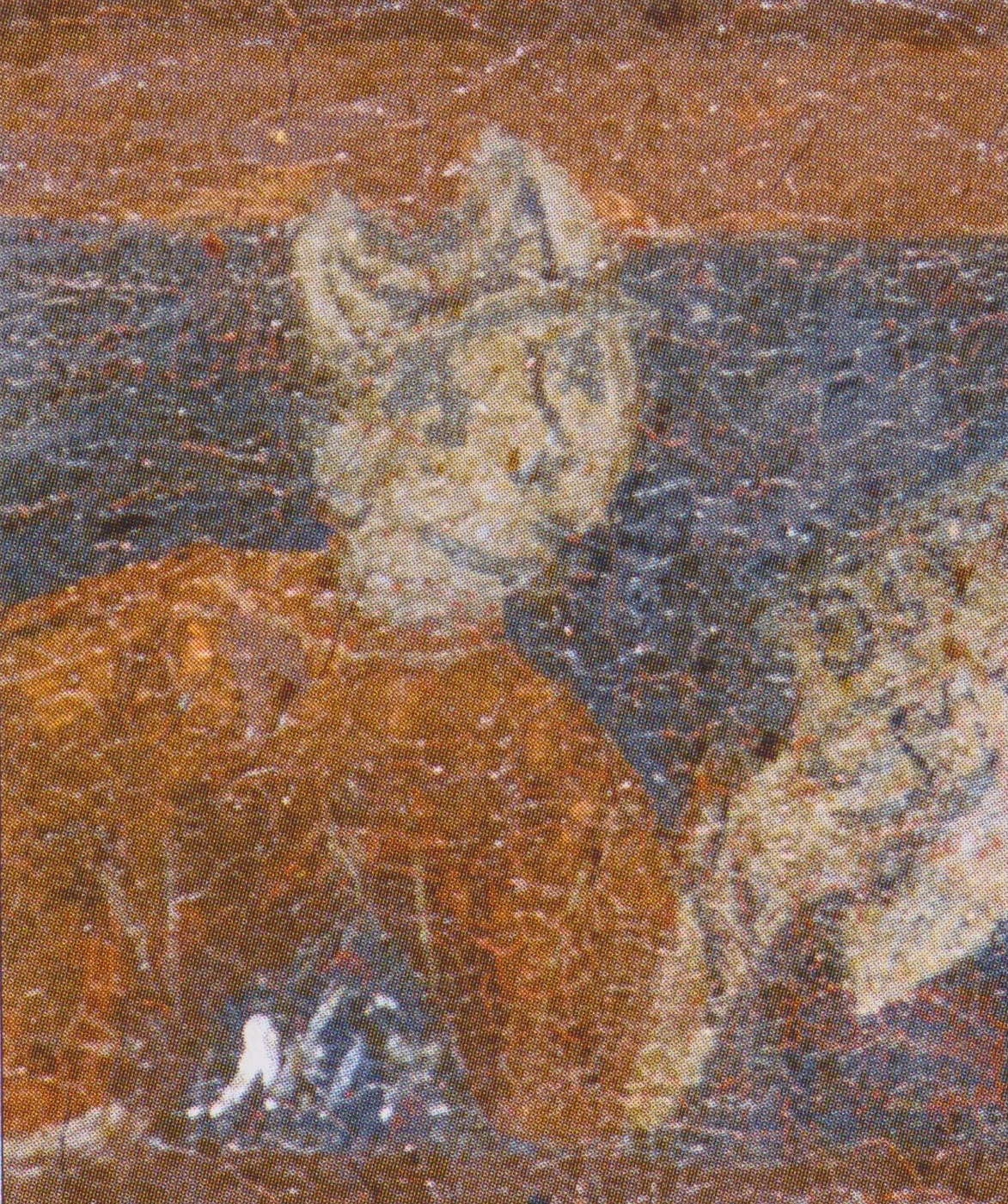
- Contemporary depiction of Job on the porta speciosa of the Esztergom Cathedral
- See: Esztergom
- Appointed: 1185
- Term ended: 1204
- Predecessor: Nicholas
- Successor: Ugrin Csák elected
- Other post: Bishop of Vác

Personal details
- Died: 1 February 1204 Esztergom, Hungary
- Education: Abbey of Saint Genevieve

Job (Hungarian: Jób; died 1 February 1204) was a Hungarian prelate at the turn of the 12th and 13th centuries, who served as Bishop of Vác from 1181 to 1183, and as Archbishop of Esztergom from 1185 until his death.

== Early life ==
Job was born in the early 1150s. His origin is uncertain. Around 1180, he studied at the Abbey of St Genevieve in Paris, alongside several other Hungarian clergymen. Its abbot, Stephen wrote a letter to Béla III of Hungary to inform him that one of those clerics, Bethlehem, died of illness, while his companions, Job, Adrian and Michael were present on his deathbed. Bethlehem's parents, former judge royal Lawrence, who has been in exile in Austria for years, and his wife Christina also received a letter from the abbot, who assured them that their son died without leaving a debt, and Stephen thanked the donation sent earlier for the abbey (golds, chasubles, horses and banners). When Stephen's letters were first published in 1661, which collection later became part of the Patrologia Latina, historiographer Masson misspelled Job's name to Jacobus (James), but Hungarian archivist György Györffy corrected the mistake, after examining the original codes. As Bethlehem was of noble origin, Györffy supposed that Job was also a highborn cleric, who were sent by Béla III to France to benefit from higher education. Béla's first spouse was Agnes of Antioch, who played a decisive role in the spread of French cultural patterns in the Kingdom of Hungary.

Returning home, Job was elected Bishop of Vác in 1181, while Adrian became chancellor in the royal court (Béla was responsible for the establishment of the Royal Chancery) and later served as Bishop of Transylvania. Their other mate Michael also died in Paris, not long after Bethlehem, according to the St Genevieve Abbey's funerary texts. Job served as Bishop of Vác at least until 1183, but it is possible, he held the dignity until 1185, when he became Archbishop of Esztergom. His successor, Boleslaus of Vác appeared in contemporary sources only since 1193. Taking advantage of the emerging anarchy in the Byzantine Empire, Béla advanced as far as Niš and Sofia in the first half of 1183. In Sofia, he seized the casket containing the relics of St. John of Rila, and ordered it "to be transported with great honors to his land and to be laid down with honor in the church" of Esztergom, according to the saint's Life from the Sofia Prologue. However both archbishops Nicholas and Job objected against the king's intention to introduce the veneration of an Eastern Orthodox saint. John's relics remained in Esztergom for four years before being returned to Sofia in 1187. Historians Gyula Moravcsik and Tamás Bogyay argued the remains were sent back as a sign of friendly gesture to the Byzantine Empire.

== Archbishop ==
A non-authentic charter styled him archbishop already in 1175. Historian Attila Zsoldos analyzed the document in detail and revealed the contradictions between archontological data, which still exist despite that historiographical efforts which tried to correct the charter's date to 1183 or 1185. The forgery, which was written in the name of King Béla III, contains several factual errors, while other dates are incompatible with each other. Job first appeared as Archbishop of Esztergom in 1185 (without the mention of his see). Soon, Job and Adrian were jointly sent to the Kingdom of France as representants of Béla III, in order to find a bride for the king (whose wife Agnes had died in the year 1184). They negotiated with King Philip II concerning the issue. Finally, Béla married Henry II's widowed daughter-in-law, Margaret of France, in the summer of 1186. She was the daughter of Louis VII of France and sister of Philip II.

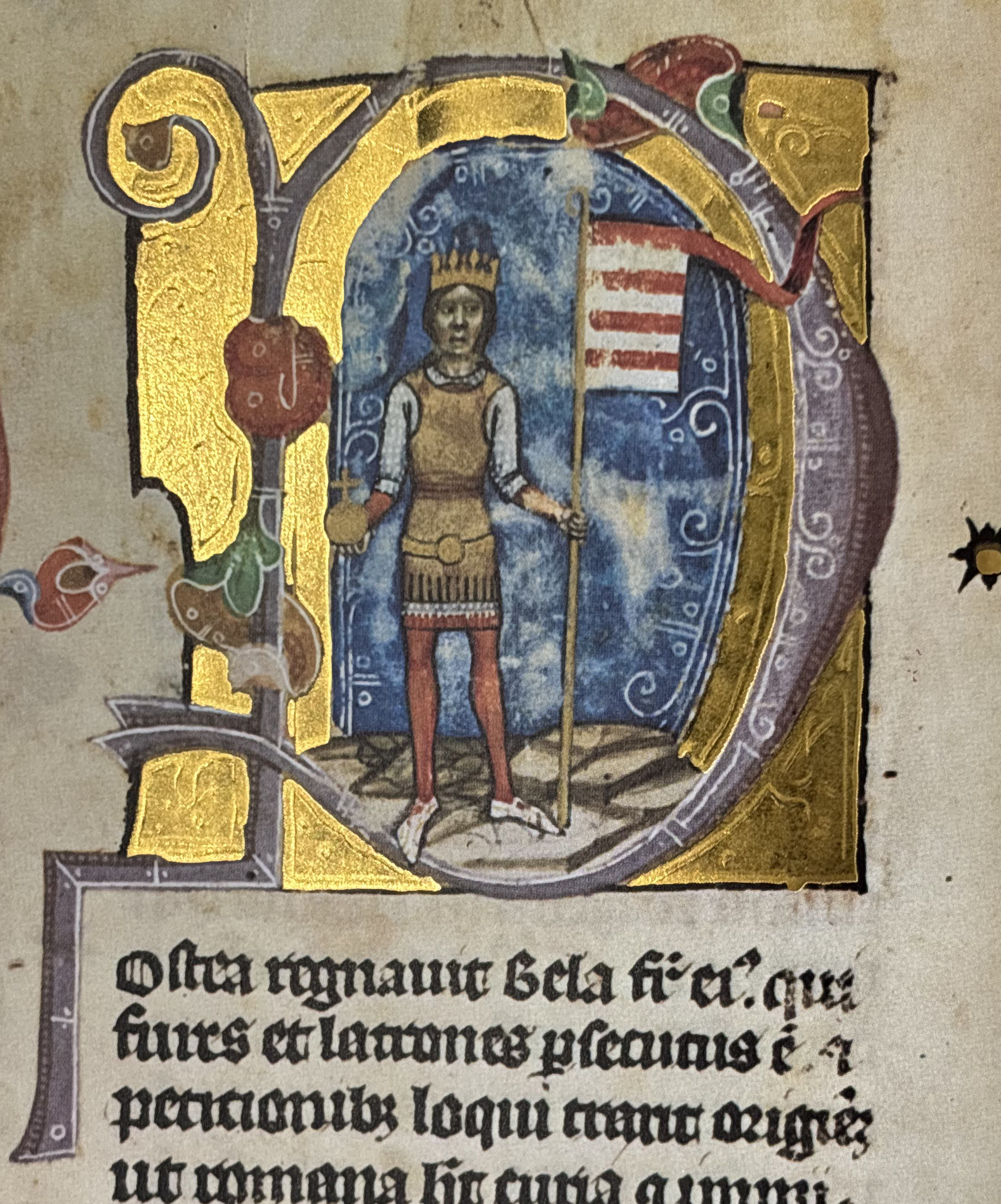
Job's ally and monarch, King Béla III from the Illuminated Chronicle

Immediately after his election, Job strived to strengthen his paramount position within the domestic church hierarchy. Upon his request, Pope Lucius III confirmed all of the privileges and freedoms of the Archdiocese of Esztergom in April 1185. This privileges were confirmed by Pope Celestine III in 1188 and 1191, as well as Pope Innocent III in 1198 too. Pope Celestine stressed the role of the Archbishop of Esztergom as one of the three requirements at the coronation of the Hungarian monarch in his December 1191 charter (the last three coronations were performed by the Archbishop of Kalocsa for various reasons). Around 1188, the St. Adalbert Cathedral burned down. Job decided to rebuild the basilica "even with greater splendor" to represent its indispensable role in the Church of Hungary. The new Gothic style cathedral was consecrated in 1196.

Job was a staunch supporter of the royal authority during Béla's rule. He was sent to numerous diplomatic missions during his two decades of episcopate. Béla III and Job welcomed Frederick I, Holy Roman Emperor in the summer of 1189 in Esztergom, when German crusaders marched through Hungary into the Third Crusade. Later in that year, Job mediated a peace treaty between his monarch and Casimir II of Poland after their war for the sphere of influence over the Principality of Galicia. Job's relationship with the Byzantine Empire and the Eastern Orthodox Church was ambiguous; he escorted Béla's daughter Margaret to marry to Byzantine Emperor Isaac II Angelos. There Job had a doctrinal dispute with the Emperor, regarding the use of drowned animals and the relationship of the Son and the Holy Spirit, representing the Latin rite viewpoint. The dispute was narrated by a letter of Demetrios Tornikes. Tamás Bogyay highlighted there is no sign of hostile tone in the text, reflecting the mutual esteem between Job and Isaac. The historian considers the Emperor acknowledged his theological education and prestige with his participation in the dispute, and Job presumably spoke Greek fluently. Supporting King Béla, Job had an important role in the canonization of Saint Ladislaus I of Hungary and the spread of his cult since 1192. Alongside his monarch and Mog, Palatine of Hungary, Job took the cross as a token of his desire to organize a crusade to the Holy Land in 1195. However, he could not fulfill his oath due to Béla's death on 23 April 1196.

Emeric succeeded his father, whose whole reign was characterized by his struggles against his rebellious younger brother, Duke Andrew. Initially, Job was considered the king's supporter. For instance, his archdiocese was granted the two-thirds portion of the customs in Esztergom by Emeric in 1198, which was confirmed by Pope Innocent in the next year. Emeric also donated the royal castle of Esztergom to the archdiocese in the same charter, in addition to the customs of Pressburg (today Bratislava, Slovakia) and Szeben (today Sibiu, Romania).

During the last years of Job's episcopate, the tension between the sees Esztergom and Kalocsa over the diverging views in the question of primacy jurisdiction reached its peak, especially when John, a loyal partisan of Emeric was elected Archbishop of Kalocsa in 1202. In the same time, Job's relationship with Emeric has deteriorated drastically, most likely because he remained neutral in the power struggle between the king and his younger brother, and stayed away from the secular affairs. Some scholars argue Job pronouncedly turned against the monarch and joined Duke Andrew's court, as Emeric referred to Job as his "enemy" in his letter to Pope Innocent around 1202, when offered the royal provostries and abbeys under the supervision of Esztergom to Rome directly. Under these conditions, the rivalry between Esztergom and Kalocsa became part of a wider secular power struggle in Hungary. An episode of this conflict was recorded, when Job's episcopal blessing in a royal church, which laid in the territory of the Archdiocese of Esztergom, was interrupted by John, who marched into the cathedral with his entourage and blessed the people himself. On another occasion, John entrusted his two suffragan bishops to consecrate churches which belonged to Esztergom. John unduly wore pallium and used archiepiscopal cross during Masses. Under the pretext of Bogomilism along the southern boundary, Job requested Pope Innocent to receive a mandate of apostolic legate regarding the territory of the whole kingdom (i.e. also the Archdiocese of Kalocsa), when personally visited the Roman Curia in Palestrina (or Praeneste). Upon receiving Emeric's letter, Innocent refused this, but issued three bulls on 5 May 1203, which confirmed the privileges of the Archdiocese of Esztergom, including the right of coronation, delivering sacraments to the monarch and the royal family, the superintendence over the royal provostries and churches, ecclesiastical jurisdiction over the royal officials and the collection and reallocation of the tithe from the royal treasury. Job died on 1 February 1204 in Esztergom. After nearly two-year period of sede vacante, his rival John succeeded him as Archbishop of Esztergom in late 1205.

== Porta speciosa ==
The porta speciosa was the main entrance of the Esztergom Cathedral, built by Béla III and Job. The iconography of the gate's tympanum depicts that Saint Stephen offers Hungary to the Virgin Mary in the company of Adalbert of Prague and – anachronistically – King Béla and Archbishop Job, in accordance with the narration of Stephen's Greater Legend. It is the first known contemporary depiction of an archbishop of Esztergom. The porta speciosa of Esztergom testified Byzantine influence, which spread during the reign of Béla III. According to historian Tamás Bogyay, that gate could be the first such monumental sacred building in Cis-Alps, which dedicated to Mary. The epigraph of "iura sacrorum" reflected the primacy of Esztergom in the Hungarian church organization, in accordance with Job's endeavors.

== Sources ==
- Beke, Margit (2003). "Jób [Job]". In Beke, Margit (ed.). Esztergomi érsekek 1001–2003 [Archbishops of Esztergom 1001–2003] (in Hungarian). Szent István Társulat. pp. 75–81. ISBN 963-361-472-4.
- Bogyay, Tamás (1993). "Jób érsek és Bizánc [Archbishop Job and the Byzantine Empire]". In Beke, Margit (ed.). Strigonium Antiquum II. Kezdés és újrakezdés (in Hungarian). Esztergom Primate Archives. pp. 47–52. ISSN 1216-6669.
- Galla, Ferenc (1970). "A váci egyházmegye püspökei [The Bishops of the Diocese of Vác]". In Bánk, József (ed.). Váci egyházmegyei almanach Szent István millénium évében (in Hungarian). Roman Catholic Diocese of Vác. pp. 103–201.
- Györffy, György (1994). "Jób esztergomi érsek kapcsolata III. Béla királlyal és szerepe a magyar egyházi művelődésben [The Franco-Hungarian Connections of Job, Archbishop of Esztergom (1185–1201)]". Aetas. 9 (1). AETAS Könyv- és Lapkiadó Egyesület: 58–63.
- Koszta, László (1991). "Adalékok az esztergomi és a kalocsai érsekség viszonyához a 13. század elején [The Relation of the Archdiocese of Esztergom to that of Kalocsa up to the Beginning of the 13th Century]". Magyar Egyháztörténeti Vázlatok. 3 (1): 73–88. ISSN 0865-5227.
- Zsoldos, Attila (2011). Magyarország világi archontológiája, 1000–1301 [Secular Archontology of Hungary, 1000–1301] (in Hungarian). História, MTA Történettudományi Intézete. ISBN 978-963-9627-38-3.

Catholic Church titles
Preceded by Ded (?)	Bishop of Vác; 1181–1183	Succeeded by Boleslaus (?)
Preceded by Nicholas	Archbishop of Esztergom; 1185–1204	Succeeded by Ugrin Csák elected
