= Constance of Aragon, Holy Roman Empress =

Holy Roman Empress from 1220 to 1222

Constance
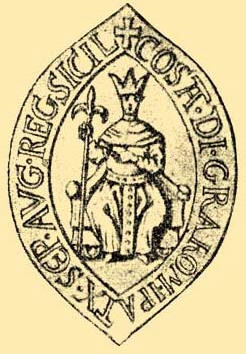

Queen consort of Hungary
- Tenure: 1198–1204

Queen consort of Sicily
- Tenure: 15 August 1209 – 23 June 1222
- Coronation: 15 August 1209

Queen consort of Germany
- Tenure: 9 December 1212/5 July 1215 – 23 April 1220
- Coronation: 5 July 1215

Holy Roman Empress
- Tenure: 22 November 1220 – 23 June 1222
- Coronation: 22 November 1220 (Rome)
- Born: 1179
- Died: 23 June 1222 (aged 42–43); Catania, Kingdom of Sicily
- Burial: Cathedral of Palermo
- Spouses: Emeric, King of Hungary; Frederick II, Holy Roman Emperor
- Issue: Ladislaus III of Hungary; Henry (VII) of Germany
- House: Barcelona
- Father: Alfonso II of Aragon
- Mother: Sancha of Castile

Constance of Aragon (Catalan: Constança d'Aragó, 1179 – 23 June 1222) was an Aragonese infanta who was by marriage firstly queen of Hungary and Croatia, and secondly queen of Germany and Sicily and Holy Roman empress. She was regent of Sicily from 1212 to 1220.

She was the second child and eldest daughter of the nine children of Alfonso II of Aragon and Sancha of Castile.

== Queen of Hungary ==
Constance's marriage to King Emeric of Hungary was credited to Emeric's stepmother, Margaret of France. The wedding took place in 1196. Four years later, in 1200, the queen gave birth to a son, called Ladislaus.

When King Emeric was dying, he crowned his son Ladislaus co-ruler on 26 August 1204. The king wanted to secure his succession and had his brother Andrew promise to protect the child and help him govern the Kingdom of Hungary until reaching adulthood. Emeric died three months later, on 30 November.

Ladislaus succeeded him as king while Andrew became his regent. Andrew soon took over all regal authority while Ladislaus and Constance were little more than his prisoners. Constance managed to escape to Vienna with Ladislaus.

The two found refuge in the court of Leopold VI, Duke of Austria, but Ladislaus died 7 May 1205. The former regent and now King Andrew II of Hungary took the body of his nephew and buried him in the Royal Crypt of Székesfehérvár. Duke Leopold sent Constance back to Aragon.

== Queen of Sicily and Holy Roman Empress ==
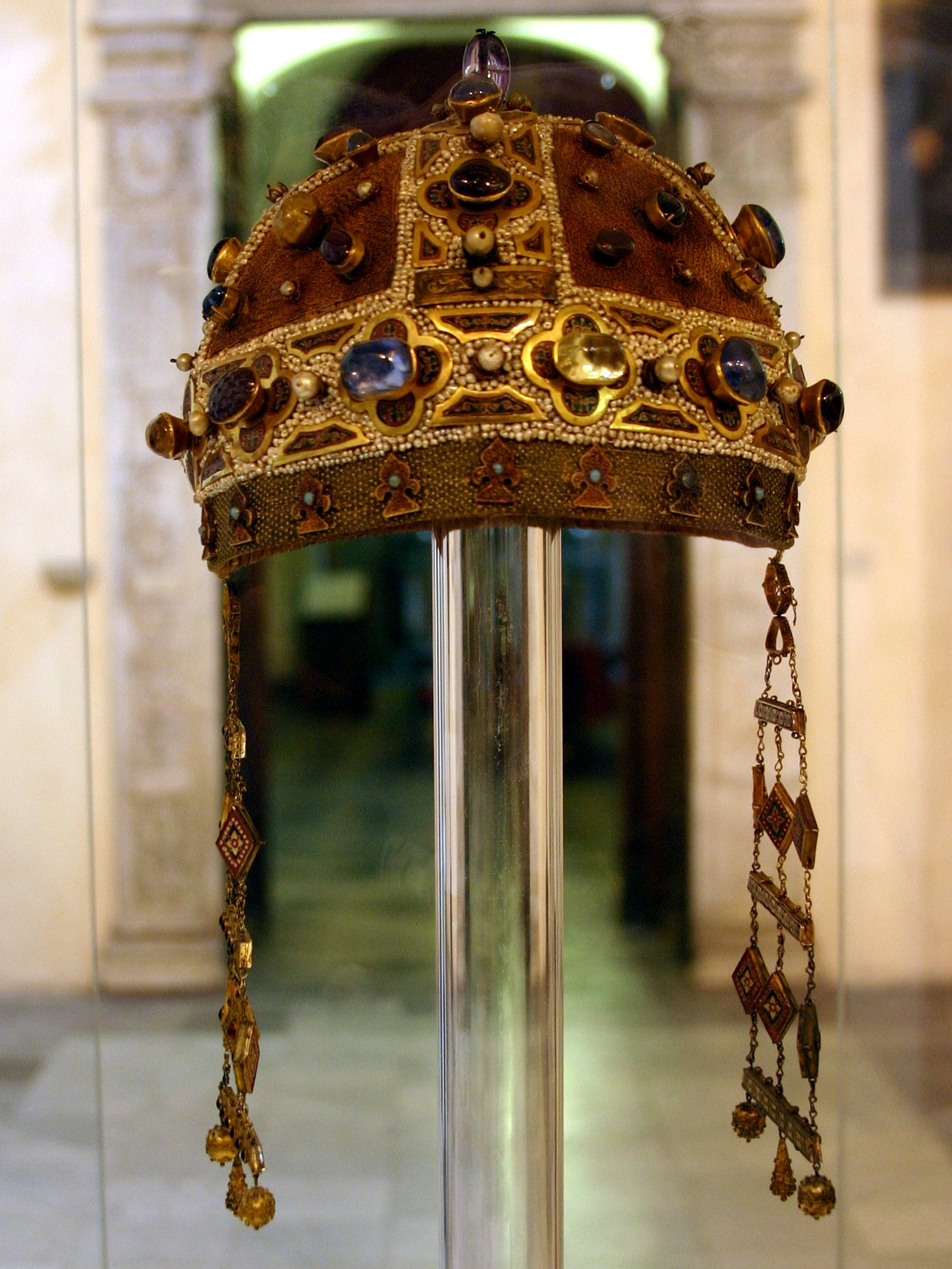
Constance of Aragon's crown, Treasury of the Palermo Cathedral

When Constance returned to Aragon, she took up residence with her mother, Queen Sancha, in the Abbey of Our Lady at Sijena; Sancha had founded the abbey after her husband's death, and now lived there in retirement. Constance spent the next three years in the abbey with her mother.

Peter II wanted to be on good terms with Pope Innocent III since he wanted an annulment of his marriage with Maria of Montpellier. The pope solicited Constance's hand for his pupil, the young King Frederick of Sicily. Peter accepted the proposal; Constance left her mother and began her trip to Sicily in 1208. Sancha died shortly after.

Constance and Frederick were married in the Sicilian city of Messina on 15 August 1209. In the ceremony, she was crowned queen of Sicily. Constance was 30 and her new husband 14. In 1211, Constance gave birth to a son, called Henry.

On 9 December 1212, Frederick was crowned king of Germany in opposition to Emperor Otto IV. Constance stayed in Sicily as regent until 1220.

At first Frederick controlled Southern Germany and Otto IV was effectively deposed on 5 July 1215. This time Constance was crowned German queen with her husband.

Pope Honorius III crowned Frederick Holy Roman emperor on 22 November 1220. Constance was crowned empress while their son Henry became the new king of Germany. She died of malaria less than two years later in Catania and was buried in the Cathedral of Palermo, in a Roman sarcophagus with a crown, the Crown of Constance.

== Sources ==
- Mielke, Christopher (2021). The Archaeology and Material Culture of Queenship in Medieval Hungary, 1000–1395. Palgrave Macmillan. ISBN 978-3-030-66510-4.111
- Kamp, Norbert (1984). "Costanza d'Aragona, imperatrice, regina d'Ungheria e di Sicilia". Dizionario Biografico degli Italiani (in Italian). Vol. 30: Cosattini–Crispolto. Rome: Istituto dell'Enciclopedia Italiana. ISBN 978-88-12-00032-6.
- Jacqueline Alio: Queens of Sicily 1061-1266, Trinacria, New York 2018.
- Uwe A. Oster: Die Frauen Kaiser Friedrichs II, Piper Verlag, Munich 2008.
- Ingo Runde: Konstanze von Aragón, in: Die Kaiserinnen des Mittelalters, hrsg. von Amalie Fößel, Pustet, Regensburg 2011, pp. 232–248.
- Austin Lane Poole: Filippo di Svevia e Ottone IV, in: Storia del mondo medievale, vol. V, 1999, pp. 54–93.
- E.F. Jacob: Innocenzo III, in: Storia del mondo medievale, vol. V, 1999, pp. 5–53.
- Michelangelo Schipa: L'Italia e la Sicilia sotto Federico II, in: Storia del mondo medievale, vol. V, 1999, pp. 153–197.
- Maria Amalia Mastelloni: Il sarcofago antico di Costanza d'Aragona, in Federico e la Sicilia, dalla terra alla corona. Arti figurative e arti suntuarie, a cura di M. Andaloro, Palermo 1995, pp. 46–52.

Constance of Aragon, Holy Roman Empress House of Barcelona Born: 1179 Died: 1222
Royal titles
Vacant Title last held by Margaret of France	Queen consort of Hungary; 1198–1204	Succeeded by Gertrude of Merania
Preceded by Maria of Brabant	Queen consort of Germany; 9 December 1212/5 July 1215 – 23 April 1220	Succeeded by Margaret of Austria
Preceded by Maria of Brabant	Empress consort of the Holy Roman Empire; 22 November 1220 – 23 June 1222	Vacant Title next held by Isabella II of Jerusalem
Vacant Title last held by Sibylla of Acerra	Queen consort of Sicily; 1209 – 23 June 1222	Vacant Title next held by Isabella II of Jerusalem
