= Čierna =

Village and municipality in Slovakia

Čierna Ágcsernyő
- Municipality
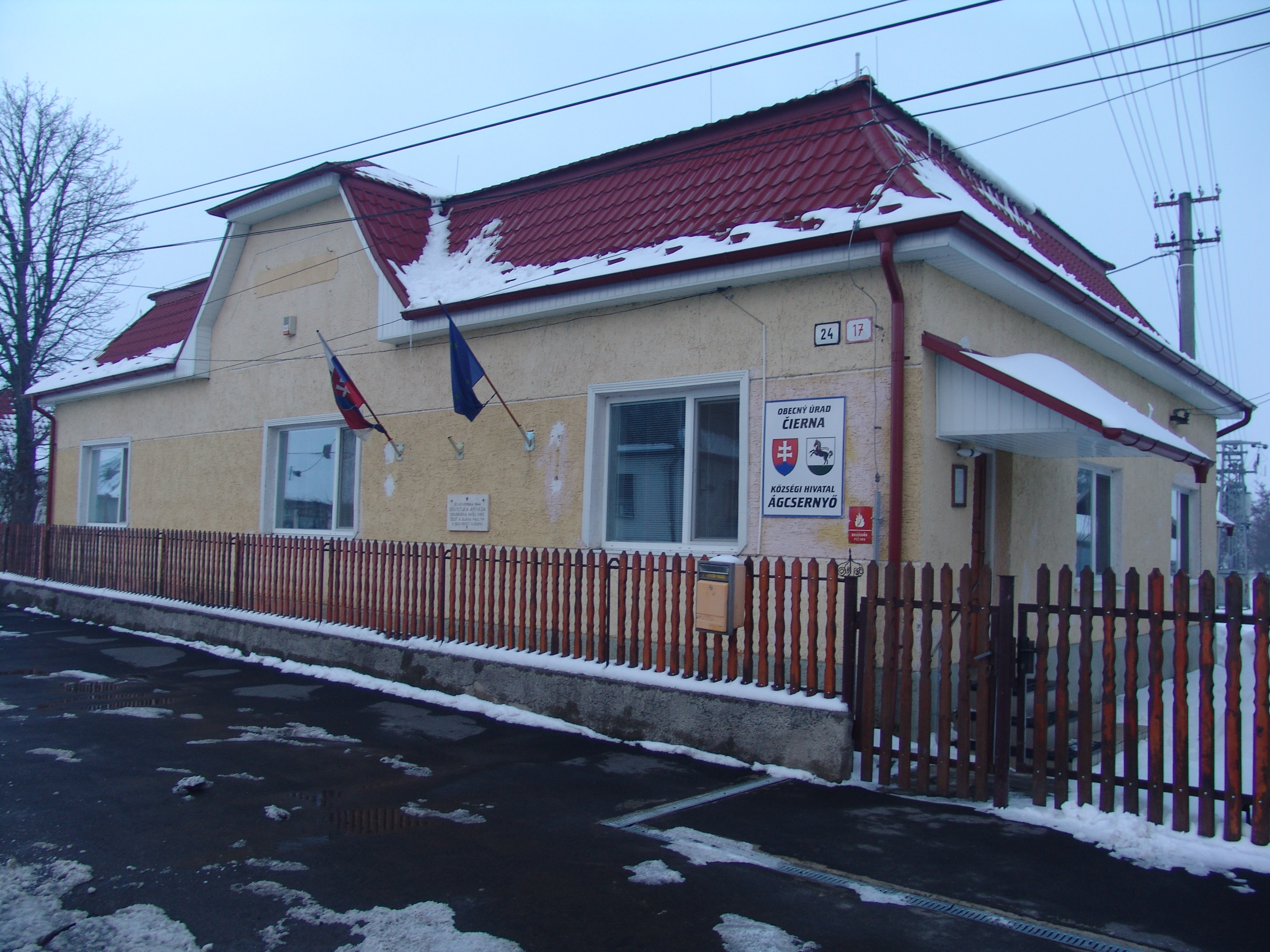

- Flag

- Location of Čierna in the Košice Region Location of Čierna in Slovakia
- Coordinates: 48.43°N 22.10°E
- Country: Slovakia
- Region: Košice Region
- District: Trebišov District
- First mentioned: 1214

Area
  - Total: 4.23 km^{2} (1.63 sq mi)
- Elevation: 100 m (330 ft)

Population (2025)
  - Total: 427
- Time zone: UTC+1 (CET)
  - Summer (DST): UTC+2 (CEST)
- Postal code: 764 3
- Area code: +421 56
- Vehicle registration plate (until 2022): TV
- Website: cierna.eu

Čierna (Slovak pronunciation: [ˈtʂɪerna]; Hungarian: Ágcsernyő) is a village and municipality in the Trebišov District in the Košice Region of south-eastern Slovakia.

== Name ==
The village's name comes from the Hungarian personal name Csernő, or archaically, Cserna. The Ág- prefix is in memory of Agh, a local landowner mentioned in a 1270 record, where the village is called Chernafewld. The Slovak version of the name was created in 1948.

== History ==
In historical records the village was first mentioned in 1214.

== Geography ==
The municipality lies at an altitude of 100 metres (330 ft) and covers an area of 4.23 km^{2} (1.63 sq mi) (2025).

== Population ==
Population statistic (10 years)
Year	1995	2005	2015	2025
Count	429	416	468	427
Difference		−3.03%	+12.5%	−8.76%

Population statistic
Year	2024	2025
Count	420	427
Difference		+1.66%

It has a population of 427 people (31 December 2025).

=== Ethnicity ===
Census 2021 (1+ %)
Ethnicity	Number	Fraction
Hungarian	333	75%
Slovak	92	20.72%
Not found out	42	9.45%
Romani	10	2.25%
Total	444	

In year 2021 was 444 people by ethnicity 333 as Hungarian, 92 as Slovak, 42 as Not found out and 10 as Romani.

Note on population: The difference values of population numbers in the table "Population statistic" and in the sections "Ethnicity" & "Religion" is caused by the use of various statistical methods.

=== Religion ===
Census 2021 (1+ %)
Religion	Number	Fraction
Calvinist Church	186	41.89%
Roman Catholic Church	151	34.01%
Not found out	38	8.56%
Greek Catholic Church	33	7.43%
None	22	4.95%
Evangelical Church	8	1.8%
Total	444	

In year 2021 was 444 people by religion 186 from Calvinist Church, 151 from Roman Catholic Church, 38 from Not found out, 33 from Greek Catholic Church, 22 from None, 8 from Evangelical Church, 3 from Jehovah's Witnesses, 2 from Baptists Church and 1 from Buddhism.

== Facilities ==
The village has a public library and a football pitch.
