= Emeric, King of Hungary =

King of Hungary and Croatia from 1196 to 1204

Emeric
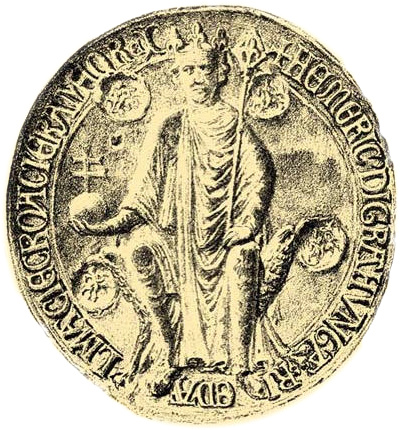
- Emeric's royal seal

King of Hungary and Croatia
- Reign: 23 April 1196 – 30 November 1204
- Coronation: 16 May 1182, Esztergom
- Predecessor: Béla III
- Successor: Ladislaus III
- Born: 1174
- Died: 30 November 1204 (aged 29–30)
- Burial: Eger
- Spouse: Constance of Aragon
- Issue: Ladislaus III
- Dynasty: Árpád dynasty
- Father: Béla III of Hungary
- Mother: Agnes of Antioch
- Religion: Roman Catholic

Emeric, also known as Henry or Imre (Hungarian: Imre, Croatian: Emerik, Slovak: Imrich; 1174 – 30 November 1204), was King of Hungary and Croatia between 1196 and 1204. In 1184, his father, Béla III of Hungary, ordered that he be crowned king, and appointed him as ruler of Croatia and Dalmatia around 1195. Emeric ascended the throne after the death of his father. During the first four years of his reign, he fought his rebellious brother, Andrew, who forced Emeric to make him ruler of Croatia and Dalmatia as appanage.

Emeric cooperated with the Holy See against the Bosnian Church, which the Catholic Church considered to be heretical. Taking advantage of a civil war, Emeric expanded his suzerainty over Serbia. He failed to prevent the Republic of Venice, which was assisted by crusaders of the Fourth Crusade, from seizing Zadar in 1202. He also could not impede the rise of Bulgaria along the southern frontiers of his kingdom. Emeric was the first Hungarian monarch to use the "Árpád stripes" as his personal coat of arms and to adopt the title of King of Serbia. Before his death, Emeric had his four-year-old son, Ladislaus III, crowned king.

== Early life (1174–1196) ==
Emeric was the eldest child of Béla III of Hungary and Béla's first wife, Agnes of Antioch. His tutor was an Italian priest, Bernard. Nicholas, Archbishop of Esztergom, crowned the eight-year-old Emeric king on 16 May 1182, which confirmed Emeric's right to succeed his father. Emeric was betrothed to Agnes, a daughter of Holy Roman Emperor Frederick I, but she died in 1184. Béla III appointed Emeric to administer Croatia and Dalmatia around 1195.

== Reign ==
=== Struggles with his brother (1196–1200) ===
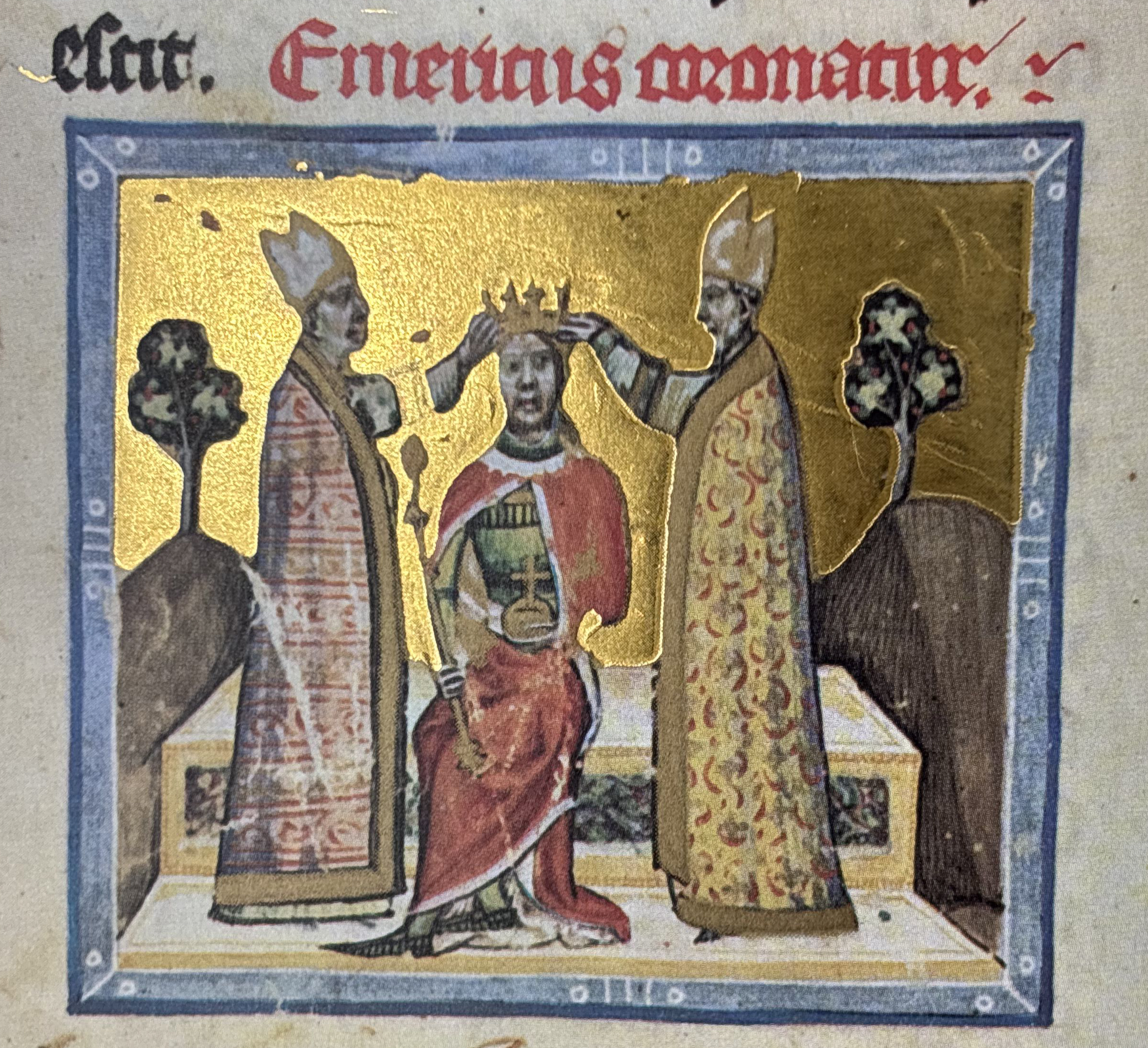
The coronation of Emeric from the Illuminated Chronicle

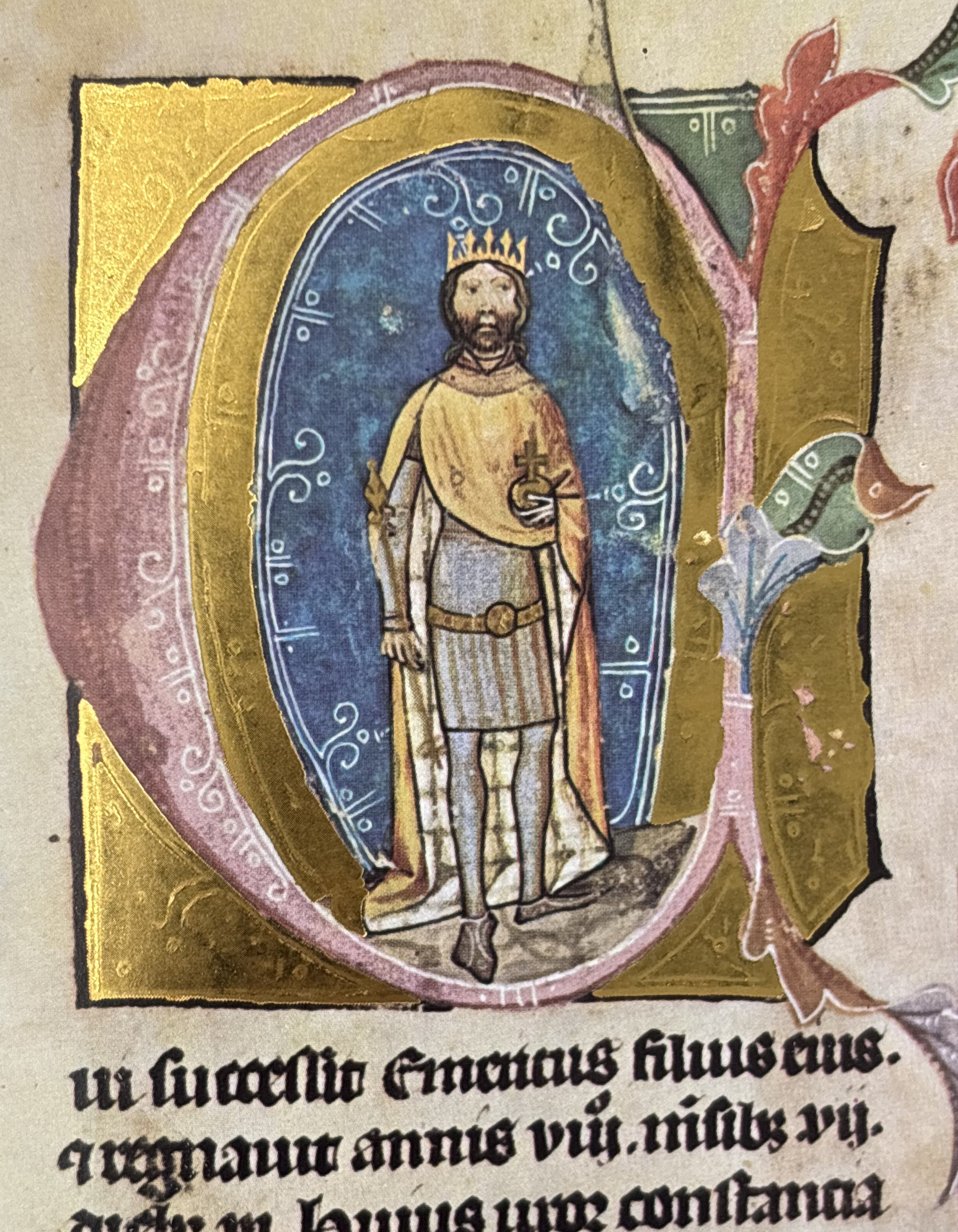
King Emeric in a royal regalia as depicted in the Chronicon Pictum

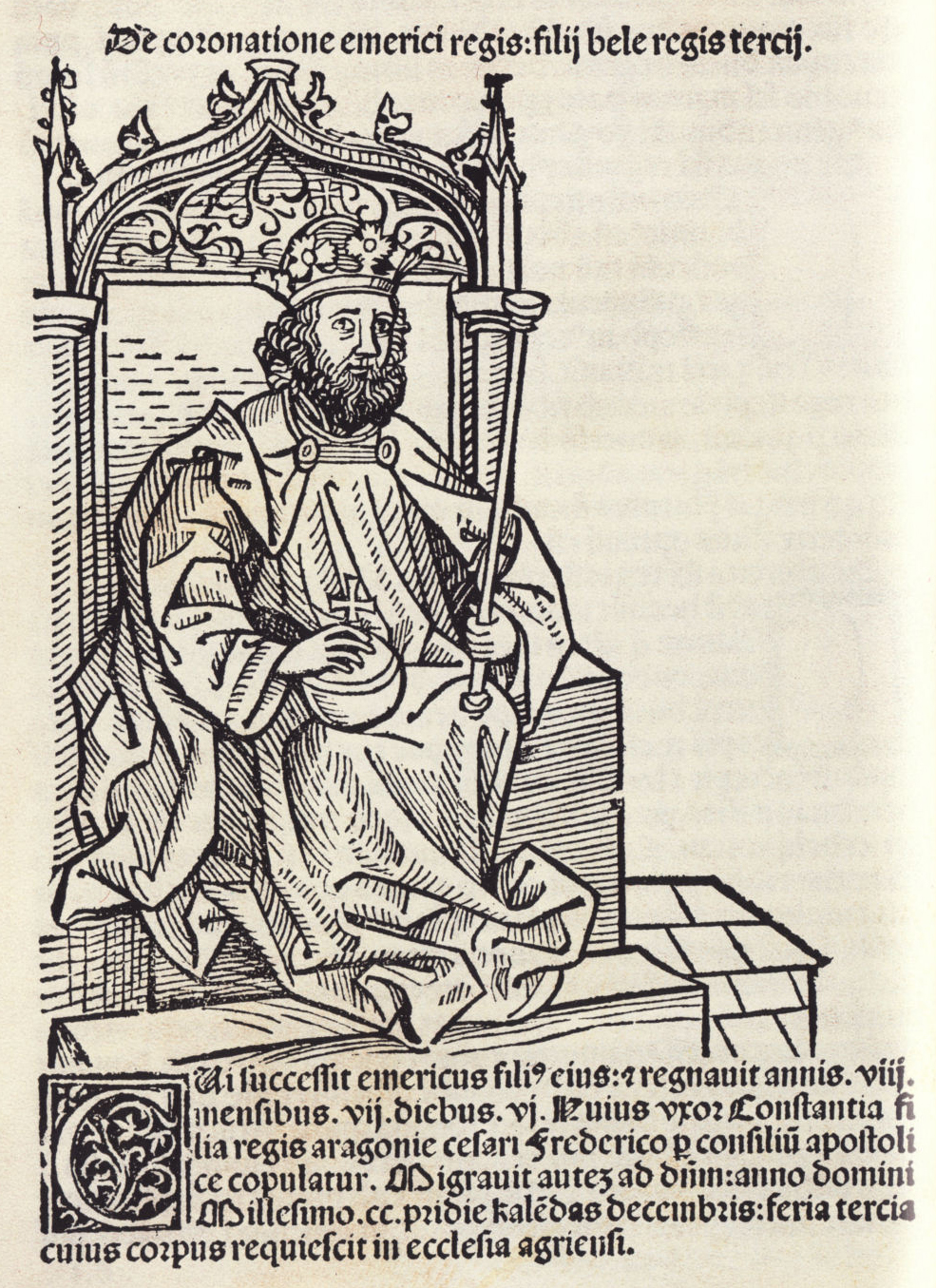
King Emeric as depicted in the Chronica Hungarorum

Emeric succeeded his father, who died on 23 April 1196. Béla III had bequeathed estates and money to Emeric's younger brother, Andrew, under the condition that Andrew should lead a crusade to the Holy Land. Instead, Andrew turned against Emeric, demanding a separate duchy for himself in 1197. Leopold VI, Duke of Austria, intervened on behalf of Andrew, and at the end of the year, their combined forces routed Emeric's troops at Mački, Slavonia. In early 1198, Emeric was forced to make Andrew Duke of Croatia and Dalmatia as an appanage.

Andrew continued to conspire against Emeric, although Pope Innocent III continued urging Andrew to launch a crusade. On 10 March 1199, Emeric forced Boleslaus, Bishop of Vác, who was a supporter of Andrew, to give him documents that proved the conspiracy against him. In the summer of that year, Emeric defeated Andrew's army near Lake Balaton, which made Andrew flee to Austria. A papal legate named Gregory arrived in Hungary to mediate a reconciliation between the two brothers. According to the brothers' treaty, Emeric once again granted Croatia and Dalmatia to Andrew in the summer of 1200.

=== Wars in the Balkans (1200–1203) ===
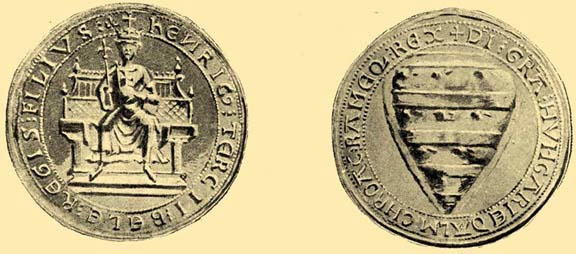
The earliest depiction of the "Árpád stripes" on Emeric's seal

The "Árpád stripes" (four Argent (silver) and four Gules (red) stripes) on Emeric's personal coat-of-arms

From around 1200, Emeric was deeply involved in the affairs of the Balkan Peninsula. On 11 October 1200, Pope Innocent urged him to take measures to liquidate the "heretics" in Bosnia. Upon Emeric's request, the Pope refused to send a royal crown to Grand Prince Stephen of Serbia. Emeric invaded Serbia in 1201 or 1202, and helped Stephen's brother Vukan seize the throne. As a token of his suzerainty over Serbia, Emeric became the first Hungarian monarch to adopt the title of King of Serbia in 1202. He was also the first king to use a royal seal depicting the so-called "Árpád stripes", which eventually became part of the coat of arms of Hungary.

In the summer of 1202, the Venetian doge Enrico Dandolo signed a treaty with the leaders of the Fourth Crusade, who agreed to help the Venetians recapture Zadar, a town in Dalmatia, which had accepted the Hungarian monarchs' suzerainty since 1186. Even though Pope Innocent III forbade the crusaders to besiege Zadar, they seized the town on 24 November and gave it to the Venetians. Although the Pope excommunicated the Venetians and the crusaders upon Emeric's demand, Zadar remained under Venetian rule.

In fear of a crusade by Emeric, Ban Kulin of Bosnia held a synod of the Church of Bosnia at Bilino Polje on 6 April 1203. The synod acknowledged papal primacy and ordered the reform of the rites. Kulin also acknowledged Emeric's suzerainty. In a letter written in 1203, the Bulgarian tsar Kaloyan informed Pope Innocent that Emeric had occupied five districts in Bulgaria, and Kaloyan demanded the Pope's intervention.

=== Last years (1203–1204) ===
Duke Andrew once again rose up in open rebellion against Emeric in the autumn of 1203. Their armies met at Varaždin on the river Drava in October. Emeric walked into his brother's camp unarmed, stating, "Now I shall see who will dare to raise a hand to shed the blood of the royal lineage!", according to the nearly contemporaneous Thomas the Archdeacon. Nobody ventured to stop the king; thus, he approached Andrew and seized him without resistance. Duke Andrew was held in captivity for months, but his supporters released him in early 1204.

Taking advantage of the civil war in Hungary, Kaloyan invaded and captured Belgrade, Barancs (now Braničevo in Serbia), and other fortresses. Emeric made preparations for a campaign against Bulgaria, but he disbanded his army upon Pope Innocent's demand. The Pope, who had been negotiating a church union with Kaloyan, sent a royal crown to him, but Emeric imprisoned the papal legate who was delivering the crown to Bulgaria when the legate was passing through Hungary.

Having fallen seriously ill, Emeric had his four-year-old son, Ladislaus, crowned king on 26 August 1204. He also released the papal legate. He reconciled with his brother, "entrusting to him the guardianship of his son and the administration of the entire kingdom until the ward should reach the age of majority", according to Thomas the Archdeacon. Emeric died on 30 November, according to the Illuminated Chronicle. Emeric was buried in the cathedral of Eger.

== Family ==
Ancestors of Emeric of Hungary

16. Álmos, Duke of Croatia
8. Béla II of Hungary
17. Predslava of Kiev
4. Géza II of Hungary
18. Uroš I of Serbia
9. Helena of Rascia
2. Béla III of Hungary
10. Mstislav I of Kiev
5. Euphrosyne of Kiev
1. Emeric of Hungary
6. Raynald of Châtillon
3. Agnes of Antioch
28. Bohemond I of Antioch
14. Bohemund II of Antioch
29. Constance of France
7. Constance of Antioch
30. Baldwin II of Jerusalem
15. Alice of Jerusalem
31. Morphia of Melitene

Emeric's wife, Constance, was the daughter of King Alfonso II of Aragon. Their marriage took place between 1196 and 1200. Their only known child, Ladislaus, was born around 1200 and died on 7 May 1205. Queen Constance, who outlived both her husband and their son, was later married to Frederick II, Holy Roman Emperor.

== Sources ==
=== Primary sources ===
- Archdeacon Thomas of Split: History of the Bishops of Salona and Split (Latin text by Olga Perić, edited, translated and annotated by Damir Karbić, Mirjana Matijević Sokol and James Ross Sweeney) (2006). CEU Press. ISBN 963-7326-59-6.
- The Hungarian Illuminated Chronicle: Chronica de Gestis Hungarorum (Edited by Dezső Dercsényi) (1970). Corvina, Taplinger Publishing. ISBN 0-8008-4015-1.

=== Secondary sources ===
- Bartl, Július; Čičaj, Viliam; Kohútova, Mária; Letz, Róbert; Segeš, Vladimír; Škvarna, Dušan (2002). Slovak History: Chronology & Lexicon. Bolchazy-Carducci Publishers, Slovenské Pedegogické Nakladatel'stvo. ISBN 0-86516-444-4.
- Berend, Nora; Urbańczyk, Przemysław; Wiszewski, Przemysław (2013). Central Europe in the High Middle Ages: Bohemia, Hungary and Poland, c. 900-c. 1300. Cambridge University Press. ISBN 978-0-521-78156-5.
- Curta, Florin (2006). Southeastern Europe in the Middle Ages, 500–1250. Cambridge University Press. ISBN 978-0-521-89452-4.
- Engel, Pál (2001). The Realm of St Stephen: A History of Medieval Hungary, 895–1526. I.B. Tauris Publishers. ISBN 1-86064-061-3.
- Érszegi, Géza; Solymosi, László (1981). "Az Árpádok királysága, 1000–1301 [The Monarchy of the Árpáds, 1000–1301]". In Solymosi, László (ed.). Magyarország történeti kronológiája, I: a kezdetektől 1526-ig [Historical Chronology of Hungary, Volume I: From the Beginning to 1526] (in Hungarian). Akadémiai Kiadó. pp. 79–187. ISBN 963-05-2661-1.
- Fine, John V. A., Jr. (1994) [1987]. The Late Medieval Balkans: A Critical Survey from the Late Twelfth Century to the Ottoman Conquest. Ann Arbor, Michigan: University of Michigan Press. ISBN 978-0-472-10079-8.
- Kristó, Gyula; Makk, Ferenc (1996). Az Árpád-ház uralkodói [Rulers of the House of Árpád] (in Hungarian). I.P.C. Könyvek. ISBN 963-7930-97-3.
- Magaš, Branka (2007). Croatia Through History. SAQI. ISBN 978-0-86356-775-9.
- Makk, Ferenc (1989). The Árpáds and the Comneni: Political Relations between Hungary and Byzantium in the 12th century (Translated by György Novák). Akadémiai Kiadó. ISBN 963-05-5268-X.
- Makk, Ferenc (1994). "Imre". In Kristó, Gyula; Engel, Pál; Makk, Ferenc (eds.). Korai magyar történeti lexikon (9–14. század) [Encyclopedia of the Early Hungarian History (9th–14th centuries)] (in Hungarian). Akadémiai Kiadó. pp. 282–283. ISBN 963-05-6722-9.
- McNeal, Edgar H.; Wolff, Robert Lee (1969) [1962]. "The Fourth Crusade". In Setton, Kenneth M.; Wolff, Robert Lee; Hazard, Harry W. (eds.). A History of the Crusades, Volume II: The Later Crusades, 1189–1311. Vol. 2 (Second ed.). Madison, Milwaukee, and London: University of Wisconsin Press. pp. 153–185. ISBN 0-299-04844-6.
- Runciman, Steven (1989) [1952]. A History of the Crusades, Volume II: The Kingdom of Jerusalem and the Frankish East. Vol. 2. Cambridge: Cambridge University Press. ISBN 0-521-06162-8.
- Sebők, Ferenc (1994). "macski csata [Battle of Mački]; rádi csata [Battle of Rád]". In Kristó, Gyula; Engel, Pál; Makk, Ferenc (eds.). Korai magyar történeti lexikon (9–14. század) [Encyclopedia of the Early Hungarian History (9th–14th centuries)] (in Hungarian). Akadémiai Kiadó. pp. 421, 565. ISBN 963-05-6722-9.

Emeric, King of Hungary House of Árpád Born: 1174 Died: 30 November 1204
Regnal titles
Vacant Title last held by Béla	Duke of Croatia and Dalmatia c. 1195–1196	Vacant Title next held by Andrew
Preceded by Béla III	King of Hungary and Croatia; 1196–1204	Succeeded by Ladislaus III
