= John Albeni =

John Albeni (Hungarian: Albeni János; Croatian: Ivan Alben) may refer to:

- John Albeni (bishop) (died 1433), Bishop of Pécs (1410–1420) and Bishop of Zagreb (1421–1433)
- John Albeni (ban) (died c. 1420), Ban of Croatia and Dalmatia (1414–1419); younger brother of the above
