= Póka family =

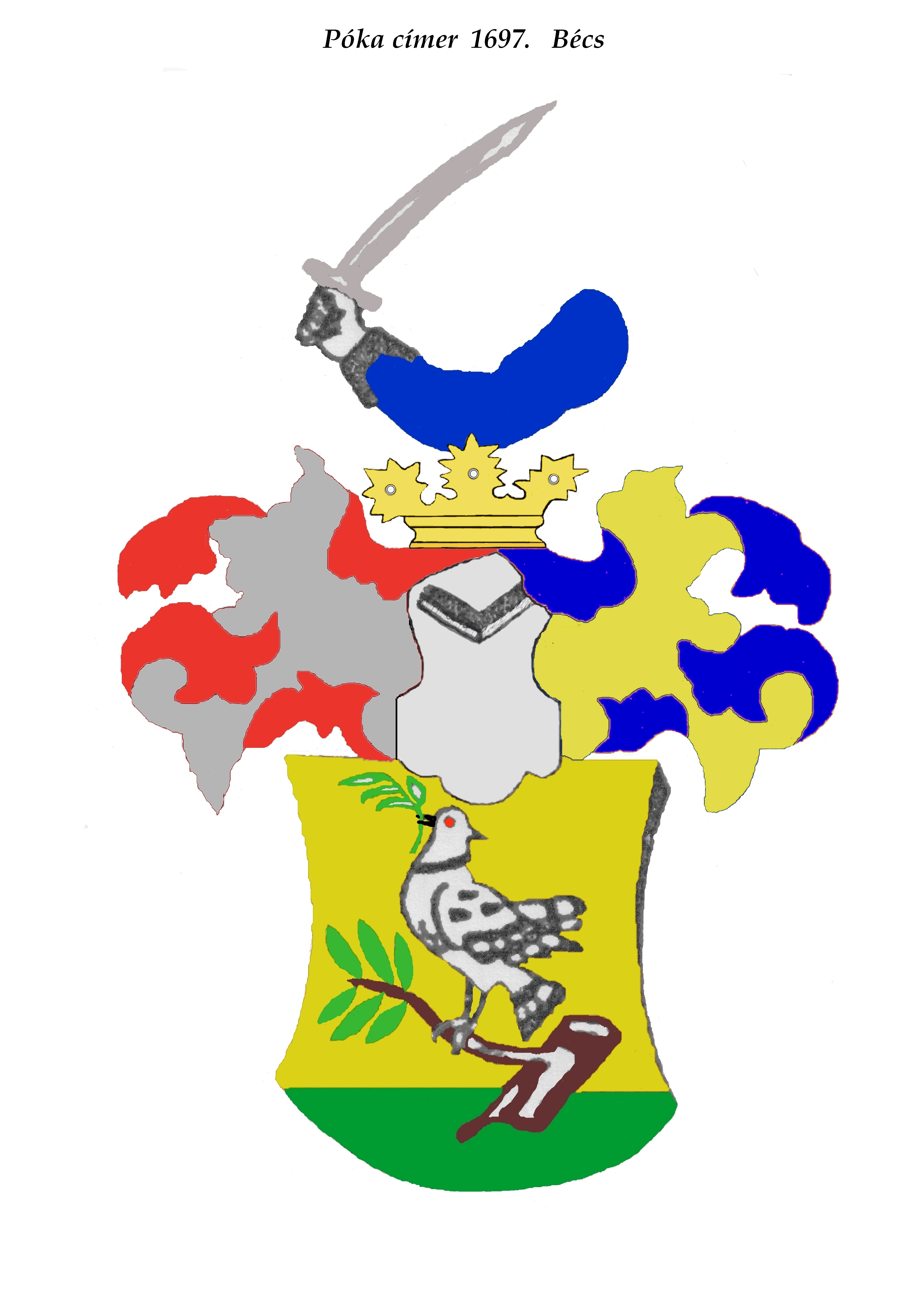
File:The Póka coat of arms

I.' The Póka of Nagysalamon family is an ancient Hungarian noble family originated from the Solomon genus.

II. The Póka of Egerfarmos family probably originated from the Vezekény or Osl or rather the Záh genera.hu:Záh nemzetség

== History ==
I.

Son of Miklós Solomon (lived around 1242) was named Póka.

II.

In 1697 King Leopold I of Hungary ennobled the Póka family. The coat of arms can be found in the Hungarian National Archives.

Ancestors of the Cziráky and Noszlopy families are thought to be bearing the Póka name, too.

Mihály Póka family tree:

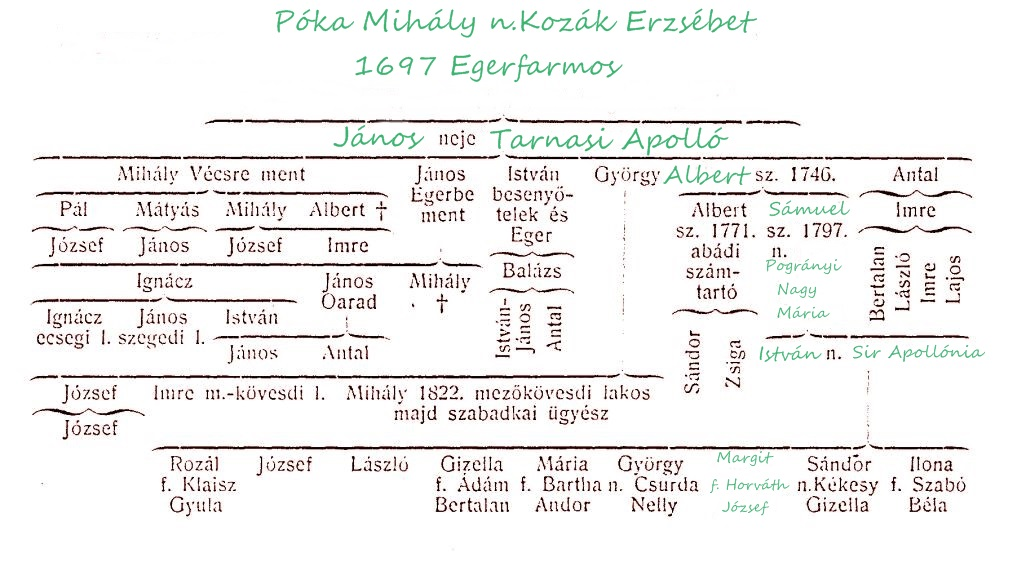
