= Makar of Pécs =

Makar was a prelate in the Kingdom of Hungary in the second half of the 13th century. He was provost of Dömös Chapter around 1156, and bishop of Pécs between around 1162 and 1186. The medieval sculptures of the cathedral at Pécs are dated to his period.

== Life ==
The first record on Makar's life (a charter of 1156 by Archbishop Martyrius of Esztergom) refers to him as provost of the collegiate chapter at Dömös. He was appointed bishop of Pécs in the reign of King Géza II of Hungary. However, Makar became one of the four prelates who assisted Géza II's brother, Stephen IV against the late king's son, Stephen III. Stephen IV's claim to the throne was promoted by the Byzantine Empire, which may account for Makar's choice, his diocese being situated on the southern borders of Hungary.

Nevertheless, Makar left Stephen IV's party, shortly after, since a charter Stephen III issued in the middle of 1163 listed him among the prelates witnessing the document. The first reference to "guest settlers" in Pécs is connected to his period, because King Béla III of Hungary confirmed a sale of a piece of land by the widow of the leader of the "guest settlers" in Pécs. The architecture of the altar dedicated to the Holy Cross in the cathedral has clear analogies in the contemporary architecture in Milan, Parma and Padua, while suggests the presence of stonemasons from Lombardy.

A non-authentic royal charter dated to 1186 contains the last reference to Makar.

Makar of Pécs Born: 1130–1135 Died: 1186
Catholic Church titles
Preceded by	Provost of Dömös c. 1156	Succeeded by
Preceded by (?) Antimius	Bishop of Pécs b. 1162–1186	Succeeded by Kalán
