= Macarius (archbishop of Esztergom) =

12th-century Roman Catholic archbishop

- Archbishop of Esztergom
- Province: Esztergom
- Diocese: Esztergom
- Appointed: 1142 or before
- Term ended: 1150 or before
- Predecessor: Felician
- Successor: Kökényes
- Other posts: Bishop of Pécs; Provost of Titel

Personal details
- Died: 25 January 1150 or before
- Denomination: Roman Catholic

Macarius (Hungarian: Makár; died 25 January 1147/1150) was a prelate in the Kingdom of Hungary in the first half of the 12th century. He was successively provost of Titel around 1127, bishop of Pécs between around 1136 and around 1139, and finally archbishop of Esztergom, until around 1147.

== Life ==
Macarius is first mentioned in a fragmentary charter he issued as royal notary in the reign of King Stephen II of Hungary. The charter is dated to the period between 1125 and 1128, and refers to him as the head or provost of the collegiate chapter at Titel (now in Serbia).

Macarius is first mentioned as bishop (but without any reference to his see) at the beginning of 1137. This year he participated at the assembly where Ladislaus, a younger son of King Béla II of Hungary was proclaimed Duke of Bosnia. In the list of the participants, Macarius is only preceded by the archbishop of Esztergom. His see at Pécs is revealed in a charter issued for the Dömös Chapter by King Béla II on September 3, 1138. Another charter, which donated villages to the monastery of Csatár, erected by Martin Gutkeled, ispán of Zala County, also refers to Macarius as bishop, but without mentioning his see. The charter is dated to the period between 1138 and 1141, the last years of Béla II.

Macarius seems to have been transferred to the see of Esztergom in some years, because three charters issued between 1142 and 1146 refer to one "Archbishop Macarius". As Jesuit scholar István Katona considered at the turn of the 18th and 19th centuries, it is presumable that Macarius is identical with that certain Archbishop "Muchia", who appears without giving the specific archdiocese in a document in May 1142, when the privileges of Split were confirmed by the royal court in the name of the minor King Géza II of Hungary. However historian Tamás Körmendi emphasizes the paleographic difficulties between the two name forms, while the authenticity of the charter itself is also doubtful. Nándor Knauz, Imre Szentpétery, László Koszta, Attila Zsoldos and – after philological and canon law considerations – Tamás Körmendi accepted Katona's claim, while József Udvardy identified "Muchia" as a previously unknown Archbishop of Kalocsa.

He is still referred to as archbishop by two charters in 1146. Macarius appeared as a witness both times on the occasion of the last testaments of lady Színes or Scines (the first preserved such document made by a woman in Hungary) and hospes Fulco, who served different prelates for decades as a secular clergyman. Macarius' name also appears in an undated royal charter, when Géza II returned the privilege of the imposition of duty near Győr to the Pannonhalma Abbey. According to the obituary of the Göttweig Abbey, Macarius died on 25 January, without mentioning the proper year. As Fulco's last testament (where the archbishop was involved) took place after 16 February 1146, Macarius died sometime between 25 January 1147 at the earliest to the same day in 1150 at the latest, as Kökényes already functioned as archbishop in that year.

== Sources ==
- Koszta, László (2009). "I. Makár (1137 e.–1139 u.)". In Fedeles, Tamás; Sarbak, Gábor; Sümegi, József (eds.). A Pécsi Egyházmegye története [A History of the Diocese of Pécs, Volume I: Medieval Centuries, 1009–1543] (in Hungarian). Vol. I: A középkor évszázadai (1009–1543). Pécs: Fény Kft. pp. 65–66. ISBN 978-963-88572-0-0.
- Körmendi, Tamás (2003). "Makár [Macarius]". In Beke, Margit (ed.). Esztergomi érsekek 1001–2003 [Archbishops of Esztergom 1001–2003] (in Hungarian). Szent István Társulat. pp. 49–52. ISBN 963-361-472-4.
- Udvardy, József (1991). A kalocsai érsekek életrajza (1000–1526) [Biographies of Archbishops of Kalocsa, 1000–1526] (in Hungarian). Görres Gesellschaft.
- Zsoldos, Attila (2011). Magyarország világi archontológiája, 1000–1301 [Secular Archontology of Hungary, 1000–1301] (in Hungarian). História, MTA Történettudományi Intézete. ISBN 978-963-9627-38-3.

Macarius (archbishop of Esztergom) Born: unknown Died: b. 1150
Catholic Church titles
Preceded by	Provost of Titel c. 1125–b. 1138	Succeeded by
Preceded by (?) Nána	Bishop of Pécs b. 1138–b. 1142	Succeeded by (?) John I
Preceded by Felician	Archbishop of Esztergom b. 1142–b. 1150	Succeeded by Kökényes
