= Bálint Alsáni =

Hungarian cardinal

- Roman Catholic Cardinal; Bishop of Pécs
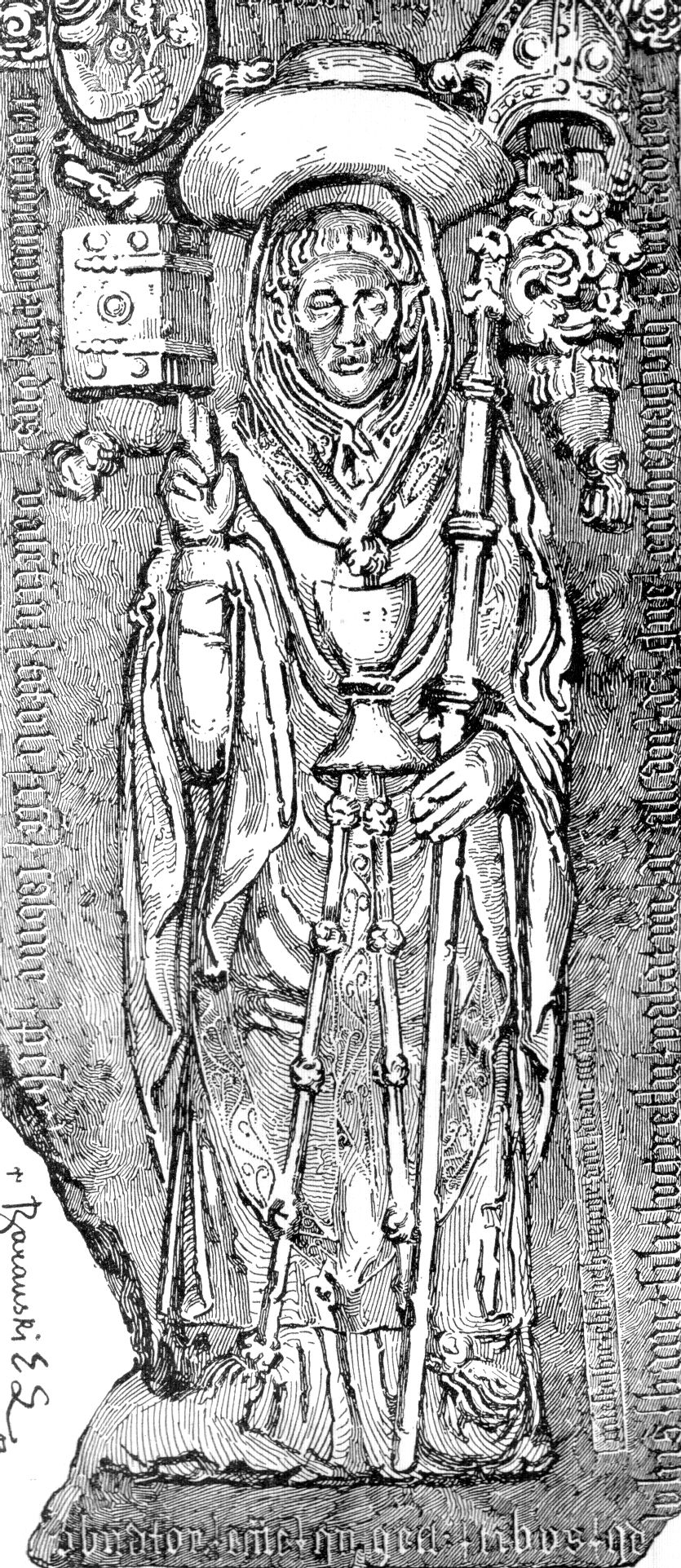
- Province: Esztergom
- Diocese: Pécs
- Appointed: 12 November 1374
- Installed: 22 November 1374
- Term ended: 19 November 1408
- Predecessor: William of Koppenbach
- Successor: sede vacante (1408–1410)

Orders
- Created cardinal: 17 December 1384 by Pope Urban VI

Personal details
- Born: c. 1330 Alsán, Kingdom of Hungary
- Died: 19 November 1408 Pécs, Kingdom of Hungary
- Buried: Pécs
- Denomination: Roman Catholic

Bálint Alsáni (French: Valentin d'Alsan; c. 1330 – 19 November 1408) was a Hungarian Cardinal, who served as the Bishop of Pécs in the Kingdom of Hungary from 1374 to his death in 1408.

== Life ==
He was a member of the kindred (gens) of Szente-Mágocs as the son of John Alsáni, who served as Ban of Macsó. He finished his studies at the University of Bologna between 1348 and 1350, where he became a doctor of canon law. he became lector at the Diocese of Veszprém in 1352 and Archdiocese of Esztergom in 1353. He served as Vice Chancellor between 6 May 1373 and 8 June 1376. As a bishop, he built a church in honor of Francis of Assisi in his birthplace, Alsán in 1376.

Louis I of Hungary appointed on 12 November 1374 and Pope Gregory XI confirmed ten days later him as Bishop of Pécs. He also served as envoy of Louis I: he moved Avignon in 1376 and participated in the peace negotiations between Padua and the Venetian Republic. He had a role in the signing of the Peace of Turin on 8 August 1381, which ended the Venetian-Genoese Wars. On his way home, He brought the relics of Paul of Thebes to Hungary, along with Paul Horvat, the Bishop of Zagreb.

After the death of Louis I (1382), he became a supporter of Mary, Queen of Hungary and his mother Elizabeth of Bosnia whom he accompanied to Dalmatia to the safeguard of Paul Horvat and his brother John Horvat, a former Ban of Macsó. However, Alsáni later joined the league of Sigismund of Luxembourg, as a result the Horvats raided Syrmia and burnt up Pécs.

During the Western Schism, he was a supporter of Pope Urban VI who created him as Cardinal on 17 December 1384. His titular church was the Basilica of Santa Sabina in Rome since 9 February 1385. He unsuccessfully tendered for the Santi Quattro Coronati in 1386. As a Cardinal, he did not participate in the papal conclaves during the period when he served as Cardinal until his death. He became a member of the Royal Council in 1400. He visited the newly elected Pope Gregory XII as envoy of Sigismund on 22 August 1407 in Viterbo to express the support of his King and also ask for help against the Ottoman Empire. He became ill during his journey in Siena as a result he returned to home across Venice. He died in November 1408. He was buried in Pécs, his tombstone remained. The position of Bishop of Pécs became sede vacante until 1410 when John Albeni was appointed to that office.

Bálint Alsáni Born: c. 1330 Died: 19 November 1408
Catholic Church titles
Preceded by William of Koppenbach	Bishop of Pécs; 1374–1408	Succeeded by sede vacante
