= Kökényes =

Hungarian prelate

- Archbishop of Esztergom
- See: Esztergom
- Appointed: 1150 or before
- Term ended: 1150 or 1151
- Predecessor: Macarius
- Successor: Martyrius

Personal details
- Died: after 1150

Kökényes (also Kuknis, Latin: Quuchinus or Quinquenus; died after 1150) was a Hungarian prelate in the 12th century, who served as Archbishop of Esztergom around 1150.

== Life ==
Based on his name, Kökényes was presumably born into the gens (clan) Kökényesradnót of Hispanic or French origin. It is possible his nephew was Mikod, Bishop of Győr. Historian Gyula Pauler identified his person with that provost Quuchinus, who appears in an undated royal charter, when King Géza II confirmed his father's donations to the Csatár Abbey.

Only one reliable source, the Kievan Chronicle mentioned his primacy. According to its narrative, when Géza II led his army against Vladimirko (Volodimirko) of Galicia in the autumn of 1150, he captured Sanok, but Vladimirko bribed the group of Hungarian noblemen, including Archbishop "Kuknis" (Hungarian: Kuknyis), who persuaded Géza to leave Galicia before November. The narration reflects Kökényes' secular influence in the Hungarian royal court.

"Volodimir[ko] [...] scared and sent [his envoys] to Archbishop Kuknis [Kökényes] and to two other bishops and the king's [Géza II] men. He persuaded them in this manner: he gave them a great deal of gold and won them over with gifts, so that the king would turn back. And so they were telling [that]. The king listened them and began to say: «This is not the time [for war], the rivers are icing. Let's go home, before the rivers freeze over completely. [...]» It was around the feast day of Demetrius [26 October]. The king said this and had gone, causing a lot of troubles to Volodimir and his land."

— Kievan Chronicle

According to a non-authentic charter, which is allegedly dated to 1145, Kökényes (now "Quinquenus") was already serving as Archbishop of Esztergom in that year. However the document (a royal donation letter), which proved to be a 15th-century forgery, contains several anachronistic elements and its witness list reflects the 1148–50 political and archontological snapshot. Kökényes possibly died either in 1150 or 1151 after a brief episcopal activity, as Martyrius succeeded him in 1151.

== Sources ==
- Font, Márta (1996). Magyarok a Kijevi Évkönyvben [Hungarians in the Kievan Chronicle] (in Hungarian). Szegedi Középkorász Műhely. ISBN 9789634821519.
- Körmendi, Tamás (2003). "Kökényes". In Beke, Margit (ed.). Esztergomi érsekek 1001–2003 [Archbishops of Esztergom 1001–2003] (in Hungarian). Szent István Társulat. pp. 52–54. ISBN 963-361-472-4.
- Zsoldos, Attila (2011). Magyarország világi archontológiája, 1000–1301 [Secular Archontology of Hungary, 1000–1301] (in Hungarian). História, MTA Történettudományi Intézete. ISBN 978-963-9627-38-3.

Catholic Church titles
Preceded by Macarius	Archbishop of Esztergom c. 1150	Succeeded by Martyrius
