= Job Záh =

Roman Catholic prelate

Job from the kindred Záh (Hungarian: Záh nembeli Jób) was a Roman Catholic prelate in the Kingdom of Hungary in the 13th century. He was provost of the collegiate chapter of Székesfehérvár and vice-chancellor between 1251 and 1252, and bishop of Pécs from 1252 until his death in 1280 or 1281. He was involved in lasting conflict with the canons of his see, with the archbishops of Esztergom and with other prelates. Bishop Job was a partisan of the "junior king" Stephen V in the latter's conflict with the "senior king" Béla IV. Accordingly, Job reached the zenith of his influence in the period starting with the death of Béla IV, when he also held temporal offices in addition to his bishopric.

== Life ==
=== Early life ===
Job was born in a distinguished family whose estates were located in the counties Nógrád and Gömör. His parents are unknown, but royal charters refer to his two brothers named Záh and Ladislaus. His nephew was the infamous assassin Felician Záh. Job was a popular name in the 13th-century Hungary, thus his early career cannot be reconstructed. When the first certain reference was made to him in 1247, he was already provost of the cathedral chapter in Bač, canon at the cathedral chapter of Zagreb and the head of the royal chapel. Job was styled "magister" which suggests that he had studied in an institution of higher education.

Prebendary to three ecclesiastical posts, quite unusual at that time, Job must have enjoyed a favored position in the royal court. King Béla IV of Hungary promoted Job to the provostship of the royal Székesfehérvár Chapter when the incumbent, Achilles from the kindred Hont-Pázmány was appointed bishop of Pécs in 1251. Vice-chancellorship was linked to his new position, thus Job became the head of the royal administration in the Kingdom of Hungary at the same time.

=== First years in the bishopric ===
When Bishop Achilles died in the first months of 1252, the canons of the cathedral chapter of Pécs elected Job their bishop upon King Béla IV's recommendation. Job soon denied the payment of the allowance of 200 marks of silver which was due to Bartholomew le Gros, a former bishop of Pécs who in his turn submitted an official complaint against Job at the Holy See. Now Job sent two canons of his cathedral to Pope Innocent IV. He applied to the pope for the permission to get a mortgage, referring to the difficult financial position of his diocese. Although the pope permitted a mortgage of 15 Venetian marks of gold, Bishop Job sent back his canons to achieve an increase. Finally he was authorized to get a mortgage of 19 marks of gold in 1253, and at the same time the allowance payable to his predecessor was decreased to 100 marks of silver. Bishop Job needed the significant amount of money for the building of a fortress in Pécs, which began around 1255.

=== Years of conflicts ===
Some members of his cathedral chapter criticized him for mortgaging the properties of the bishopric and turned first to the archbishop of Esztergom, next to the Holy See in 1259. However, Job deprived his opponents from their prebends in the cathedral chapter. According to a royal charter of 1331, Job was also involved into a conflict with the collegiate chapter of Požega where he attempted to fill the vacancies in order to strengthen his influence over the influential ecclesiastic institution of his diocese. Job maintained a close relationship with Cardinal Stephen Báncsa whose relatives and followers one after another received prebends in the chapters of the diocese of Pécs.

His envoys at the council of 1263 of the clerics of the ecclesiastical province of Esztergom declared that the bishops of Pécs were not only entitled to wear the archbispocal vestment of pallium, but were also independent of the see of Esztergom. Thereafter, the archbishops of Esztergom regarded him as being excommunicated for ignoring their authority. Bishop Job was soon involved in a conflict with the Benedictine Somogyvár Abbey as well. Upon his order, the abbot of Somogyvár was arrested and imprisoned.

Bishop Job joined the party of the "junior king" Stephen V against his father, Béla IV when a civil war broke out in the 1260s. The "junior king" entrusted the defense of the fortress of Ágasvár in Nógrád County to Bishop Job, but he could not keep the fort which fell to the partisans of the "senior king" in 1264. A charter of 1346 reveals that the castle of Pécs was also occupied under Bishop Job, probably by followers of Béla IV.

=== Last years ===
Under Kings Stephen V and Ladislaus IV Bishop Job "became one of the most influential prelates in the realm" (László Koszta). He was appointed ispán of Moson County in 1272. Therefore he was responsible for the defense of a section of the western borders against the Austrians. When Austrian troops invaded Hungary in the next year, he expelled his fellow bishop Denis from the castle of Győr and made himself the captain of the fortress. The Austrians, however, besieged and took the fortress. Bishop Job tried to offer resistance in a tower but his enemies set fire on it, thus he was obliged to surrender. Bishop Job was taken in chains into Austria.

The date of Job's release is unknown, but he was appointed chancellor of the realm in 1277, and ispán of Baranya County in 1278. The monarch also awarded Job with significant land grants, thus he became the owner of the villages Perlász, Rozsozsna, Somkút (in modern Pelsőc), Süvéte and the nearby Liponok by the end of his life. The last record of him is from the summer of 1280, and a charter of 1282 refers to his former death. His death gave rise to a 13-year-long sede vacante in the diocese of Pécs.

== See also ==
- Béla IV of Hungary
- Stephen V of Hungary

Job Záh Genus Záh Born: c. 1220 Died: b. 1282
Political offices
Preceded by Achilles Hont-Pázmány	Vice-chancellor; 1251–1252	Succeeded by Thomas Hahót
Catholic Church titles
Preceded by Achilles Hont-Pázmány	Provost of Székesfehérvár; 1251–1252	Succeeded by Thomas Hahót (elected)
Preceded by Achilles Hont-Pázmány	Bishop of Pécs; 1252–b. 1282	Succeeded by Sede vacante, then Paul Balog
