= John I of Pécs =

John I was bishop of Pécs in the Kingdom of Hungary between around 1142 and 1148. He is first mentioned in the list of witnesses of the charter issued for Split in Dalmatia in May 1142 by King Géza II of Hungary. John again witnessed a royal charter in 1146. One Bishop John is also mentioned in a charter of 1148, but his identification as the prelate in Pécs is uncertain, because the document also refers to Bishop Antimius whose name is identical with another bishop of Pécs.

John I of Pécs Born: unknown Died: unknown
Catholic Church titles
Preceded by (?) Macarius I	Bishop of Pécs b. 1143–c. 1148	Succeeded by (?) Antimius
