= Antimius =

Antimius was the bishop of Pécs in the Kingdom of Hungary between around 1148 and 1158. A royal charter of 1148 refers to one Bishop Antimius without mentioning his see. However, it also lists one Bishop John who has consensually been identified with a bishop of Pécs, thus Antimius cannot be regarded as the head of the same see. Antimius witnessed an authentic charter of 1156 as bishop of Pécs. A non-authentic charter, which all the same may have preserved the memory of real events, refers to a court case proceeding between Antimius and the abbot of Pécsvárad over the tithes paid by twelve villages and two chapels.

Antimius Born: unknown Died: unknown
Catholic Church titles
Preceded by (?) John I	Bishop of Pécs c. 1148–c. 1158	Succeeded by Makar II
