= Achilles Hont-Pázmány =

Hungarian prelate

- Bishop of Pécs
- Province: Esztergom
- Diocese: Pécs
- Appointed: 1251
- Term ended: 1252
- Predecessor: Bartholomew le Gros
- Successor: Job Záh
- Previous post: Provost of Székesfehérvár

Personal details
- Born: 1200s
- Died: 1252
- Denomination: Roman Catholic

Achilles from the kindred Hont-Pázmány (Hungarian: Hont-Pázmány nembeli Achilles) was a prelate in the Kingdom of Hungary in the middle of the 13th century. He was provost of the collegiate chapter of Székesfehérvár and vice-chancellor between 1243 and 1251, and bishop of Pécs from 1251 until his death in 1252.

== Life ==
Achilles (Hungarian: Ehellős) was one of the five children of Pázmány from the kindred Hont-Pázmány. Although the genus Hont-Pázmány was one of the most illustrious clans in the Kingdom of Hungary, its Újhely branch from which Achilles descended was less prosperous. The small family lands were located in the region of the rivers Berettyó and Körös.

All the same, Achilles was admitted to the royal court sometime after 1225, where he was employed as royal chaplain. His early career is uncertain, because there were four namesake clergymen in the Kingdom of Hungary in the 1230s and 1240s. He can most probably be identified with one Achilles, provost of the cathedral chapter of Esztergom from around 1236. When the Mongols invaded the Kingdom of Hungary in 1241, this Achilles fled to Dalmatia similarly to King Béla IV of Hungary. Since Archbishop Matthias Rátót of Esztergom was killed by the Mongols in the Battle of Mohi, Achilles administered the archdiocese for more than two years.

Following the withdrawal of the Mongols, Provost Achilles was at least twice appointed by the pope to investigate the circumstances of appointments to higher Church offices, including the election of Benedict as Archbishop of Kalocsa in 1243. In the same year, he also acted as co-judge regarding filling the post of archdeacon of Sopron. Achilles himself was transferred to the collegiate chapter of Székesfehérvár in September 1243. Head of the prestigious chapter, Achilles also became the vice-chancellor, the leader of the royal administration. The royal chancery started to function more uniformly under his auspices, and the registration of the charters issued by the chancery was also begun in this period. King Béla IV of Hungary granted him a landed property in Ugocsa County which suggests that the monarch also respected Achilles's work.

King Béla IV sent Achilles to the court of Daniel, Prince of Halych in 1246, in order to betroth his daughter Constance to Leo, Daniel's son, according to the Galician–Volhynian Chronicle. This occurred following Daniel repulsed the attack of the Hungarians led by Béla's son-in-law and claimant Rostislav Mikhailovich in the previous year.

When Bishop Bartholomew le Gros of Pécs retired in 1251, King Béla IV recommended Achilles to his place. Respecting the monarch's wish, the canons of the cathedral chapter of Pécs elected Achilles bishop in the spring of 1251. He is first styled as bishop-elect on 23 July 1251. The pope confirmed his election by 23 November 1251. The new bishop visited the monastery his predecessor had established for hermits on the Saint James (Ürög) Hill at Pécs and personally marked out the borders of its nearby properties. He also promised to make further donations to the community, but he unexpectedly died in the first months of 1252. He left his lands in Ugocsa to his relatives.

== Sources ==
- Barabás, Gábor (2023). Delegated Papal Jurisdiction in Arpadian Hungary. Bishops – provosts – papal chaplains. Arpadiana XVI., Research Centre for the Humanities. ISBN 978-963-416-405-0.
- Koszta, László (2009). "Hont-Pázmány nembeli Achilles (1251–1252)". In Tamás Fedeles; Gábor Sarbak; József Sümegi (eds.). A Pécsi Egyházmegye története I: A középkor évszázadai (1009–1543) [A History of the Diocese of Pécs, Volume I: Medieval Centuries (1009–1543)] (in Hungarian). Pécs: Fény Kft. pp. 77–80. ISBN 978-963-88572-0-0.
- Senga, Toru (2018). "Achilles alkancellár Halicsban 1246-ban. Adalék a magyar vice szó történetéhez [Vice Chancellor Achilles in Halych in 1246: Data on the history of Hungarian vice "deputy"]". Magyar Nyelv (in Hungarian). 114 (1). Magyar Nyelvtudományi Társaság: 44–58. ISSN 0025-0228.
- Zsoldos, Attila (2011). Magyarország világi archontológiája, 1000–1301 [Secular Archontology of Hungary, 1000–1301] (in Hungarian). História, MTA Történettudományi Intézete. ISBN 978-963-9627-38-3.

Achilles Hont-Pázmány Genus Hont-Pázmány Born: b. 1210 Died: 1252
Political offices
Preceded by Nicholas	Vice-chancellor; 1243–1251	Succeeded by Job Záh
Catholic Church titles
Preceded by Benedict	Provost of Székesfehérvár; 1244–1251	Succeeded by Job Záh
Preceded by Bartholomew	Bishop of Pécs; 1251–1252	Succeeded by Job Záh
