= Mikod (bishop of Győr) =

Hungarian bishop

- Bishop of Győr
- Appointed: 1176
- Term ended: 1186 or later
- Predecessor: Andrew
- Successor: Ugrin Csák
- Other post: Provost of Székesfehérvár

Personal details
- Died: after 1186

Mikod (died after 1186) was a Hungarian prelate in the 12th century, who served as Bishop of Győr from 1176 until his death.

== Career ==
Mikod (also Mikud, Micudinus or Mendinus) was plausibly born into the gens (clan) Kökényesradnót, which possessed landholdings in the southeastern part of Nógrád County. It is presumable that his uncle was Kökényes (Kuknis), the Archbishop of Esztergom around 1150. Under his patronage, Mikod attended the University of Paris. In France, he became acquainted with the Premonstratensians of Lotharingia.

Returning Hungary, Mikod became the Provost of Székesfehérvár sometime in the 1160s. In this capacity, he founded the Premonstratensian Abbey of Garáb in Nógrád County prior to 1171. It was dedicated to St. Hubertus. This was the earliest non-royal Premonstratensian monastery in the Kingdom of Hungary. Mikod invited friars from Riéval Abbey in Upper Lotharingia. Charters of Pope Alexander III in 1171 and 1179 refer to Garáb as a dependent territory of Riéval Abbey.

Mikod was elected Bishop of Győr in 1176, succeeding Andrew. During the summer of 1176, the newly elected Archbishop Andrew led a Hungarian ecclesiastical delegation to Győr, also including bishop-elect Mikod, the newly elected provost Gregory of Székesfehérvár and Raynald, Abbot of Pannonhalma. They had assisted papal legate Walter, Bishop of Albano there, who was sent to the region to resolve the conflict between Holy Roman Emperor Frederick Barbarossa and Adalbert, Archbishop of Salzburg. Mikod was involved in a conflict with Similis, Abbot of Pannonhalma around 1184 and 1185. According to the latter's complaint, Mikod unlawfully seized the church of Fény (Keresztúr) in the Diocese of Veszprém from the abbey. Pope Lucius III sent his legate, Bishop Theobald of Ostia to Hungary in order to investigate the case and judge over the lawsuit.

== Sources ==
- Bánk, József, ed. (1968). Győregyházmegyei almanach. Schematizmus Dioecesis Jaurinensis [Almanac of the Diocese of Győr] (in Hungarian). Authority of the Diocese of Győr.
- F. Romhányi, Beatrix (2000). Kolostorok és társaskáptalanok a középkori Magyarországon: Katalógus [Monasteries and Collegiate Chapters in Medieval Hungary: A Catalogue] (in Hungarian). Pytheas. ISBN 963-7483-07-1.
- Zsoldos, Attila (2011). Magyarország világi archontológiája, 1000–1301 [Secular Archontology of Hungary, 1000–1301] (in Hungarian). História, MTA Történettudományi Intézete. ISBN 978-963-9627-38-3.

Catholic Church titles
| Preceded by Andrew | Bishop of Győr; 1176–c. 1186 | Succeeded by Ugrin Csák |
