= Nikola Stepanić Selnički =

Nikola Selnički
- Born: Nikola Stepanić; 1553; Selnica, Konjščina
- Died: 1602 (aged 48–49)
- Other names: Nicolaus Zelniczey
- Occupation: Catholic priest

Nikola Stepanić Selnički (Latin: Nicolaus Zelniczey, Hungarian: Zelniczey IV. Miklós) was a Catholic bishop of the Roman Catholic Diocese of Pécs (1596-1598) and Roman Catholic Archdiocese of Zagreb (1598-1602). With his 1598 and 1599 activities aimed to impose his feudal authority over Serbs who populated a year earlier vast territories in Slavonia, abandoned for more than 40 years, he initiated the "Vlach question".

== Early life ==
According to Sakcinski, Selnički was born in Selnica near Konjšćina in 1553 in a family which is a branch of Turopolje nobility. According to some other sources Selnički was a son of Stephan from Bosnia, who descended from a noble family. He studied in at University of Paris and in Bologne.

He wrote a chronicle with detailed description of the 1593 Battle of Sisak which is not preserved.

== Vlach question ==
When Serb settlers came to Habsburg military frontier (in modern-day Croatia) they were settled on the land which remained vacant for more than 40 years. Soon after Serbs were settled in Slavonia, Selnički began with his activities against them. In 1598 Selnički received information that emperor Rudolf was going to grant Serbs privileges which would guarantee their status of people free from their feudal obligations. Selnički was the first of Croatian nobility who tried to impose his rule over Serb settlers. Furthermore, Selnički actually was the initiator of the "Vlach question" in Croatia with his intention to impose his feudal authority over Serbs, populated a year earlier on his estates by Varaždin general Sigismund.

In July 1599 Selnički requested that Serbs (Vlachs) populated a year before on the territory of his estates should not be given any privileges.

== Sources ==
- Goldstein, Ivo (1994). Sisačka bitka 1593. Zavod za hrvatsku povijest Filozofskoga fakulteta Sveučilišta u Zagrebu. ISBN 9789531750257.
- Ivić, Aleksa (1922). Јурисдикција славонских племића и српски досељеници од 1598 до 1630 г. [Jurisdiction of Slavonian nobles and Serbian settlers from 1598 to 1630]. In Popovich, Pavle (ed.). Прилози за књижевност, језик, историју и фолклор [Contributions on literature, language, traditions and folklore] (in Serbian). Vol. 2. Belgrade: Državna štamparija Kraljevine Srba, Hrvata i Slovenaca. pp. 201–226.
- Kostić, Lazo M. (1990). Sporne teritorije Srba i Hrvata. Dosije. ISBN 9788681563113.
- Kudelić, Zlatko (2007). Marčanska biskupija: Habsburgovci, pravoslavlje i crkvena unija u Hrvatsko-slavonskoj vojnoj krajini (1611. - 1755). Hrvatski Inst. za Povijest. ISBN 978-953-6324-62-0.
- Rječnik (1954). Rječnik hrvatskoga ili srpskoga jezika.
- Protić, Stojan; Milovanović, Milovan; Pavlović, Dragoljub (1907). Delo. A.M. Stanojević.
- Rječnik (1956). Rječnik hrvatskogo ili srpskoga jezika, na svijet izdaje Jugoslavenska akademija znanosti i umjetnosti. U kńižarnici L. Hartmana na prodaju.
