= Kalán =

Kalán may refer to:

- Călan, a town in Romania
- Kalán from the kindred Bár-Kalán, medieval Hungarian nobleman
