= Pál Széchényi (bishop) =

Hungarian Roman Catholic archbishop

- Archbishop of Kalocsa
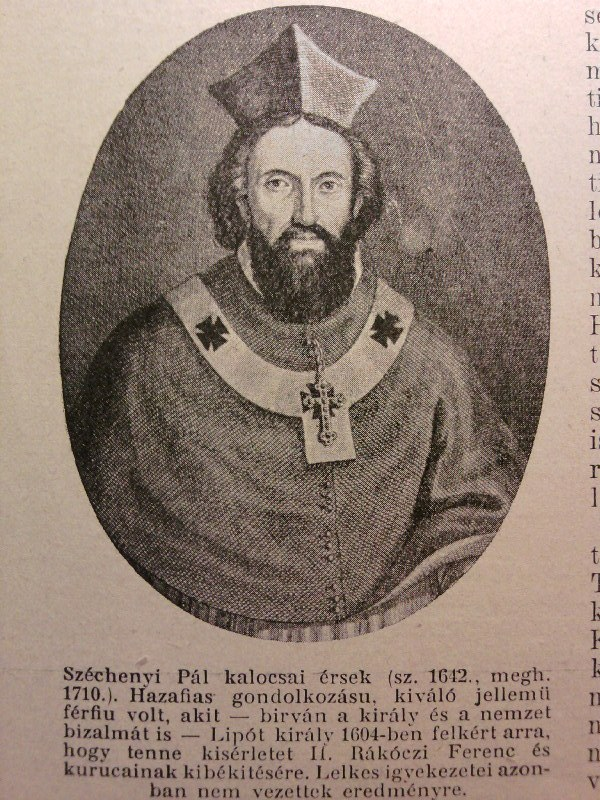
- See: Archdiocese of Kalocsa
- Other posts: Previously Bishop of Veszprém, Bishop of Pécs

Personal details
- Born: 28 July 1645 Gyöngyös
- Died: 22 May 1710 (aged 64) Sopron

Count Pál Széchényi (28 July 1645 – 22 May 1710) was a Hungarian Roman Catholic archbishop.

== Early life ==
Széchényi was born on 28 July 1645 in Gyöngyös into the Széchenyi family. He was the third child of Lőrinc Széchényi and Judit Gellén. Among his siblings were Márton (or Ferenc, b. 1637), Erzsébet (b. 1643), Kata (b. 1649), Judit (b. 1652), Márton (b. 1653), György (b. 1656).

== Career ==
On 22 March 1662, he entered the Pauline Order in Bánfalva, and then earned a master's degree as a Pauline monk in Rome. He was the master of the order's students in Máriavölgy near Bratislava, from 1673 he was a theology professor at the University of Nagyszombat, and later became a secular priest. From 1676 to 1687 he was Bishop of Pécs, from 15 September he became a Royal Councilor and Abbot of Szentgotthárd, from 1677 he was a canon and Grand Provost of Győr in 1687. He was made Bishop of Veszprém on 26 April 1710, and Archbishop of Kalocsa in 1696. He could not move to his archdiocese seat due to the destruction caused by the long Turkish rule, but he did a lot for the benefit of the archdiocese and the county. Due to his appointment as bishop and archbishop, he also became the hereditary Lord of Veszprém County and then Bács County.

King Leopold I elevated the Széchényi family to the rank of Imperial Count on 30 March 1697. On 16 October 1698, the king appointed him as the chief Lord of Bács County (of which he was already the hereditary Chief Lord due to his ecclesiastical office). On 2 January 1704, the Viennese court entrusted him with negotiating with the party of Prince Francis II Rákóczi and mediating an agreement between the emperor and the Kurucs. However, the court refused to meet the Kurucs' demands, so the negotiations remained fruitless.

== Personal life ==
The archbishop died on 22 May 1710 in Sopron. After his death, he was buried in Bánfalva, although his body was later transferred to the family tomb in Nagycenk in 1811. His mummified body lies in a glass-covered coffin in the tomb.

Catholic Church titles
| Preceded by János Gubasóczy | Bishop of Pécs; 1676–1687 | Succeeded by Mátyás Ignác Radonay |
| Preceded by István Sennyey | Bishop of Veszprém; 1687–1710 | Succeeded by János Otto Volkra |
| Preceded by Leopold Kollonich | Archbishop of Kalocsa; 1696–1710 | Succeeded by Imre Csáky |
