= Nana of Pécs =

Nana was, according to a falsified charter dated to 1135, bishop of Pécs (Hungarian: Nána pécsi püspök) in the Kingdom of Hungary. Although the charter itself was not authentic, its compiler plausibly used an original charter from the same period. Therefore, the existence of a bishop of Pécs named Nana in the 1130s can be accepted. All the same, Nana only administered his diocese for one or two years, because his successor is mentioned for the first time in 1136.

Nana of Pécs Born: unknown Died: unknown
Catholic Church titles
Preceded by (?) Simon	Bishop of Pécs c. 1135	Succeeded by Macarius I
