= József Petheő =

Hungarian prelate

The Most Reverend József Petheő
- Auxiliary Bishop of Pécs
- Church: Roman Catholic Church
- See: Diocese of Pécs
- Appointed: 24 July 1797

Orders
- Ordination: 31 March 1755
- Consecration: 10 September 1797

Personal details
- Born: 4 December 1731 Pécs, Austria-Hungary
- Died: 3 July 1809 (aged 77) Austria-Hungary

József Petheő (4 December 1731 – 3 July 1809) was a Hungarian prelate of the Roman Catholic Church. From 1797 until his death in 1809, he served as Auxiliary Bishop of Pécs.

== Biography ==
Petheő was born in Pécs, Austria-Hungary on 4 December 1731. He was ordained a deacon on 12 January 1755, and was ordained a priest on 31 March 1755.

On 24 July 1797, at the age of 65, he was appointed Auxiliary Bishop of the Diocese of Pécs by Pope Pius VI. On that same day, he was also appointed Titular Bishop of Methone, and was consecrated on 10 September 1797.

He died on 3 July 1809.
