= Martyrius (archbishop of Esztergom) =

Hungarian prelate

- Archbishop of Esztergom
- See: Esztergom
- Appointed: 1151
- Term ended: 1158
- Predecessor: Kökényes
- Successor: Lucas
- Other posts: Bishop of Veszprém; Bishop of Eger

Personal details
- Died: 26 April 1158
- Buried: Esztergom Basilica

Martyrius or Martirius (died 26 April 1158) was a Hungarian prelate in the 12th century, who served as Bishop of Veszprém from around 1127 to 1137, Bishop of Eger from 1142 to 1150, and finally Archbishop of Esztergom from 1151 until his death.

== Early career ==
His origin and family relationships is unknown. His name appears in royal documents in various forms, including Martyrius, Martirius, Martyrus and – incorrectly – Martinus (Martin). Between around 1127 and 1137, he served as Bishop of Veszprém. In this capacity, he was only mentioned by the last will and testament of hospes Fulco from 1146; accordingly, the testator recalls that he served five bishops of the Diocese of Veszprém as their cleric during his life in the following order: Matthew, Nana, Martyrius, Peter and Paul. It is known that Martyrius' predecessor Nana was last referred to as Bishop of Veszprém in 1127 by a charter of Stephen II of Hungary, while Peter first appeared in the same position in 1137 (according to a non-authentic charter, in 1135, but that document contains several contradictory information).

By 1142, Martyrius was transferred to the dignity of Bishop of Eger. In the 12th century, when the relocation of bishops was generally forbidden, Martyrius is one of the three only known prelates alongside Prodeanus and Ugrin Csák, who was transferred from a diocese to another equal diocese. He first appeared as Bishop of Eger in May 1142, when the privileges of Split were confirmed by the royal court in the name of the minor King Géza II of Hungary. In the document, he is incorrectly referred to as Martin (Martinus). Another charter, which donated villages to the monastery of Csatár, erected by Martin Gutkeled, ispán of Zala County, also refers to Martyrius as bishop, but without mentioning his see. The charter is dated to the period between 1138 and 1141, the last years of Béla II, thus it is presumable that Martyrius was already Bishop of Eger by then. According to the Annales Posonienses, Martyrius consecrated the Benedictine abbey of Széplak in Újvár County (today Krásna, Slovakia) in 1143, which was founded by the gens (clan) Aba and dedicated to Virgin Mary. In the same year, a large number of Saxons were settled to the sparsely populated northeastern parts of the Diocese of Eger, including Kassa, Eperjes and the surrounding villages (today Košice and Prešov in Slovakia, respectively). Martyrius was last mentioned as Bishop of Eger in a royal charter of Géza II, dated to 1150.

== Archbishop ==
Martyrius was elected Archbishop of Esztergom in 1151, presumably succeeding Kökényes. According to an undated charter of Géza II, the Pannonhalma Archabbey was confirmed as the owner of certain lands in the same year, when Martyrius became archbishop and Géza met Henry Jasomirgott, Margrave of Austria, which contributed to the normalization of their strained relations, which took place in 1151. Even Martyrius wrote in a letter in 1156, he had filled the office for six years by then. As one of his first measures, he consecrated the Óbuda Cathedral in the same year, dedicated to Virgin Mary, and appointed a certain Mikó as its first provost. In contemporary records, Martyrius is first mentioned as archbishop in 1152, when he appears as a witness on the occasion of the last will and testament of lady Margaret in Pannonhalma (an important source of 12th-century Hungarian economic history).

When the engagement between Géza's sister Sophia and Henry Berengar, son of Conrad III of Germany was broken, she remained in Germany, becoming a nun at the convent of Admont (today in Austria). After that Géza sent a letter to Admont to bring her back to Hungary. However, Sophia did not want to leave, insisting instead that she wished to remain in the monastery as a nun. Then Géza decided to send a diplomatic mission around 1152 to negotiate her return. The Hungarian delegation was led by Archbishop Martyrius. The abbot of Admont gave Sophia the choice of staying or leaving. Once more, she affirmed her desire to become a nun, and Géza II finally permitted her to stay at Admont. His political influence is reflected by a letter from king's envoy Adalbert around 1153, who wrote he is sent to Roger II of Sicily to forward a message "at the command of King Géza II and Archbishop Martyrius".

Martyrius established and consecrated an altar, dedicated to the Holy Virgin Mary, within the St. Adalbert Cathedral in Esztergom in 1156. Meanwhile, with the permission of Géza, he provided the tithe of 70 villages in the surrounding Nyitra, Bars, Hont and Esztergom counties to the Chapter to finance its operation and the weekly ceremonies, in addition to the local St. Nicholas chapel as the place of convent. Still in 1156, he consecrated the church of Barátka (built by a certain Eusidinus) in Bars County, dedicated to Martin of Tours. In the establishing charter, Martyrius donated the villages of Barátka, Léva and Visk (today Levice and Vyškovce nad Ipľom in Slovakia) to the church, establishing its parish district. This is the only preserved document, when Martyrius used his own seal. Some historians, for instance, László Erdélyi and Richard Marsina considered Martyrius' charter (called as "Diploma of Eusidinus" in Hungarian historiography) as a 14th-century forgery, citing anachronistic elements in the text (e.g. the words parochia or missale). After a philological examination, Erzsébet Ladányi accepted the document as authentic. Martyrius appears as a witness in a royal charter (it was possibly also issued in 1156), when Géza II donated large-scale landholdings two foreign knights Gottfried and Albert. Sometimes during the last years of his episcopate, Martyrius established a church dedicated to Saint Stephen of Hungary near Székesfehérvár, according to the charter of King Béla III, when the church already belonged to the Knights Hospitaller. The construction of the cathedral was finished by Géza's spouse Queen Euphrosyne of Kiev after the death of Martyrius. In 1157, Martyrius appears as a witness, when the Barátka church was granted the salt custom of Nána and Párkány (Štúrovo, Slovakia) by Géza. In the same year, Martyrius countersigned the last will and testament of comes Wolfer (co-founder of the gens Héder and ancestor of the Kőszegi family).

According to a non-authentic charter, which contains royal donations to the Diocese of Nyitra, Archbishop Martyrius was still alive on 13 February 1158. He and other bishops also appear in a forgery which claimed that Géza transliterated Saint Stephen's privilege donations to the Pécsvárad Abbey (as the original document have been destroyed during a fire in 1105). According to the 18th-century historian and clergyman Miklós Schmitth, Martyrius died on 26 April 1158. He was buried under the altar of the Esztergom Cathedral, consecrated by himself two years ago.

== Sources ==
- Körmendi, Tamás (2003). "Martyrius". In Beke, Margit (ed.). Esztergomi érsekek 1001–2003 [Archbishops of Esztergom 1001–2003] (in Hungarian). Szent István Társulat. pp. 55–58. ISBN 963-361-472-4.
- Ladányi, Erzsébet (1978). "Az Euzidinus-oklevél hitelességének kérdéséhez [On the Question of the Authenticity of the Charter of Euzidinus]". Levéltári Közlemények (in Hungarian). 48–49 (1–2). National Archives of Hungary: 51–59. ISSN 0024-1512.
- Sugár, István (1984). Az egri püspökök története [The History of the Bishops of Eger] (in Hungarian). Szent István Társulat. ISBN 963-360-392-7.
- Zsoldos, Attila (2011). Magyarország világi archontológiája, 1000–1301 [Secular Archontology of Hungary, 1000–1301] (in Hungarian). História, MTA Történettudományi Intézete. ISBN 978-963-9627-38-3.

Catholic Church titles
Preceded by Nana	Bishop of Veszprém c. 1127–1137	Succeeded by Peter I
Preceded by Beztrius (?)	Bishop of Eger; 1142–1150	Succeeded by Lucas
Preceded by Kökényes	Archbishop of Esztergom; 1151–1158	Succeeded by Lucas
