= William of Koppenbach =

Hungarian bishop

- Bishop of Pécs
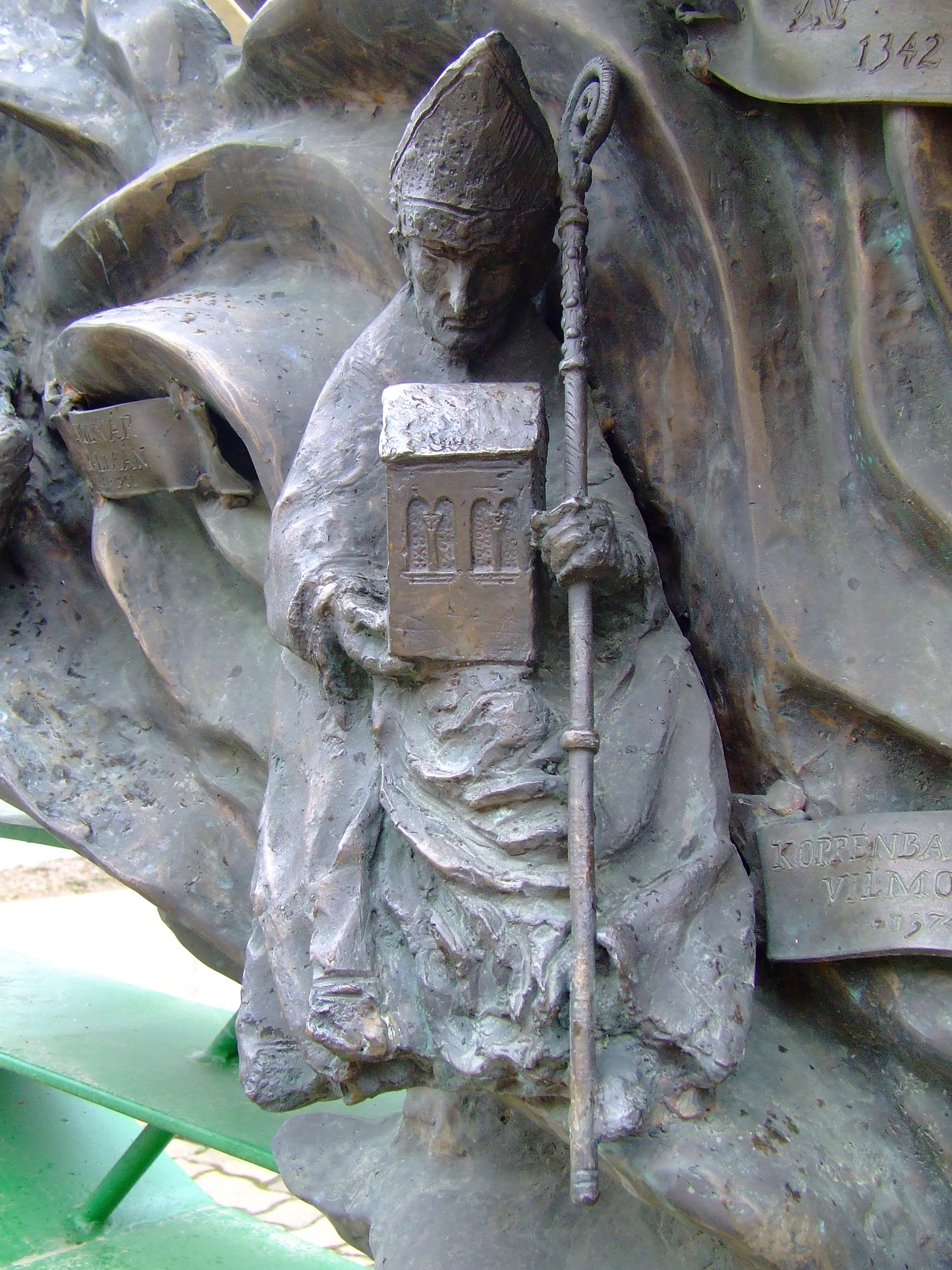
- Province: Esztergom
- Diocese: Pécs
- Installed: 18 January 1361
- Term ended: 1374
- Predecessor: Nicholas Neszmélyi
- Successor: Bálint Alsáni

Personal details
- Born: 1316
- Died: 1374 (aged 57–58)
- Denomination: Roman Catholic

William of Koppenbach (died 1374) was bishop of Pécs in the Kingdom of Hungary from 1361 to his death in 1374. He served as the first Chancellor of the University of Pécs which founded by Louis I of Hungary and Pope Urban V in 1367.

William of Koppenbach Died: 1374
Catholic Church titles
Preceded by Nicholas Neszmélyi	Bishop of Pécs; 1361–1374	Succeeded by Bálint Alsáni
