= Nicholas Neszmélyi =

Hungarian/Polish bishop

- Bishop of Pécs
- Province: Esztergom
- Diocese: Pécs
- Installed: 30 March 1346
- Term ended: 26 March 1360
- Predecessor: Ladislaus Kórógyi
- Successor: William of Koppenbach

Personal details
- Born: Unknown
- Died: 25 July 1360
- Denomination: Roman Catholic

Nicholas Neszmélyi de Poroszló (died 25 July 1360) was bishop of Pécs in the Kingdom of Hungary from 30 March 1346 to 26 March 1360, not long before his death.

== Life ==
Nicholas was born into a Polish noble family from Silesia. He was a cleric in the Diocese of Wrocław. He arrived to Hungary as a distant relative of Elizabeth of Poland, Queen of Hungary in 1322. He became an educator of the young Prince Louis. In 1339, the estates of Neszmély returned to the Crown, when the holder family became heirless. Nicholas has used his influence to obtain the possessions. Henceforth his name appeared as Nicholas Neszmélyi ("of Neszmély") in contemporary sources. According to the land survey, he obtained the "estate of Neszmély with arable lands, shrubs, ferry, water and land tariffs back and forth, fishing rights in the Danube, two islands, by name Neszmélyi Island and Für Island until the middle of the Danube", along with his cousins, Hancko and Matthias.

Later he was also received Poroszló, Heves County by King Louis I. After that he used the noble title of poroszlói or de Poroszló. He was appointed secret chancellor and chapel ispán in 1344. He also served as Canon of Győr. He was the elected Archbishop of Kalocsa from 15 October 1344 to 9 October 1345, however Pope Clement VI was not confirmed and appointed Stephen Büki as archbishop instead of him. He was appointed Bishop of Pécs on 30 March 1346.

He participated in the Neapolitan campaigns of Louis the Great in 1347. He led a 200-strong army to help the Hungarians in L'Aquila. He built a new church in Pécs with eight altars. The church later known as Aranyos Mária Chapel. He transported the relic of Livinus from Ghent, Flanders to Pécs in 1351. He placed great emphasis on development of educational level and academic skills of the clergy. He completed the organizational governance of the diocese and stabilized its economy. Due to his work, the first university of Hungary was founded in Pécs in 1367, during the period of his successor, William of Koppenbach.

Nicholas Neszmélyi Died: 25 July 1360
Catholic Church titles
Preceded by Ladislaus Kaboli	Archbishop of Kalocsa-Bács (elected); 1344–1345	Succeeded by Stephen Büki
Preceded by Ladislaus Kórógyi	Bishop of Pécs; 1346–1360	Succeeded by William of Koppenbach
