= Záh (gens) =

Genus (gens) Záh
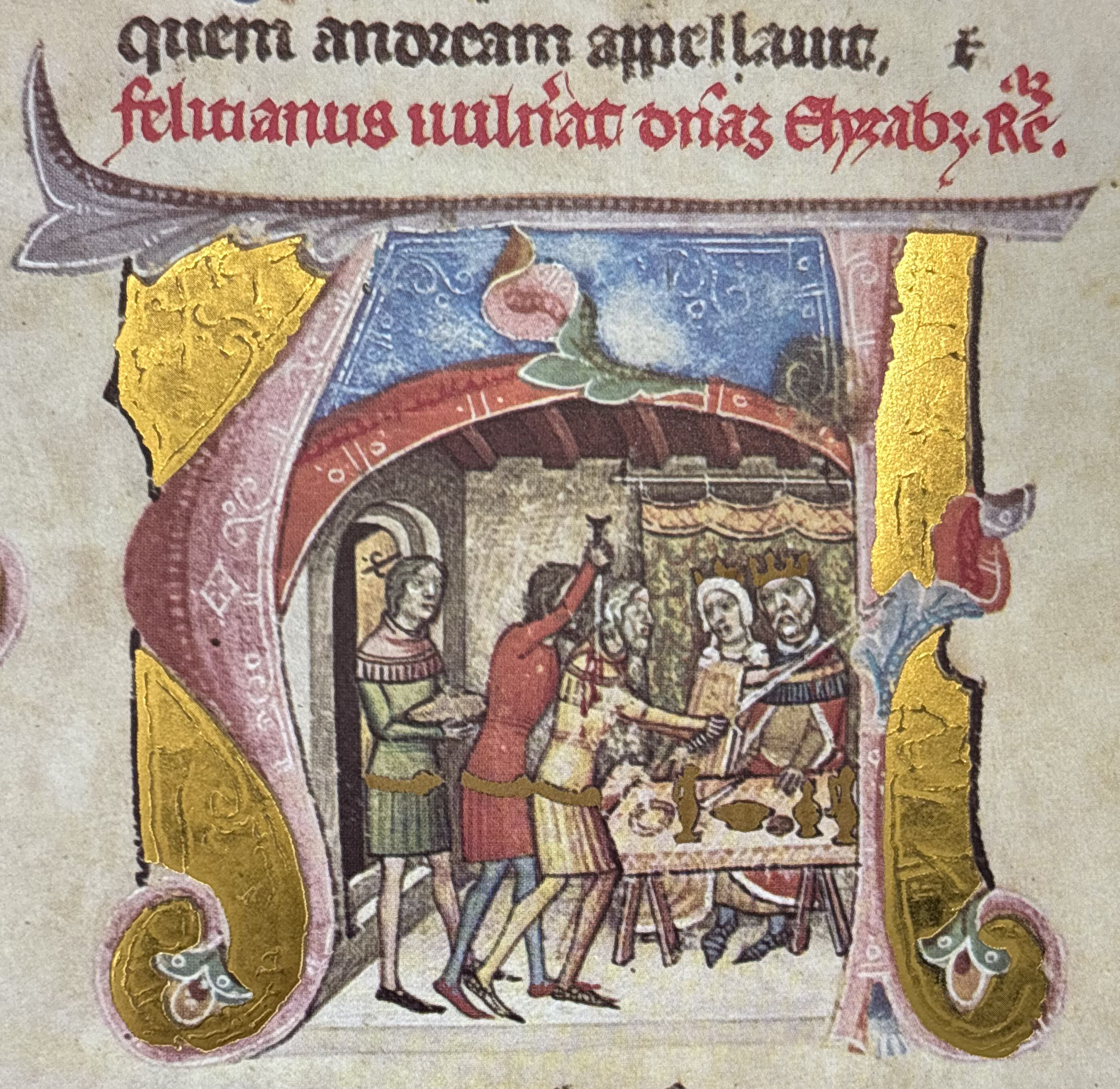
- Country: Kingdom of Hungary
- Dissolution: 14th century (?)

Záh (Zaah or Zách) was the name of a gens (Latin for "clan"; nemzetség in Hungarian) in the Kingdom of Hungary. The clan was one of the 108 gentes during the Hungarian conquest of the Carpathian Basin and located in Nógrád County along with the Kacsics, Kartal, Kökényesradnót and Tomaj clans.

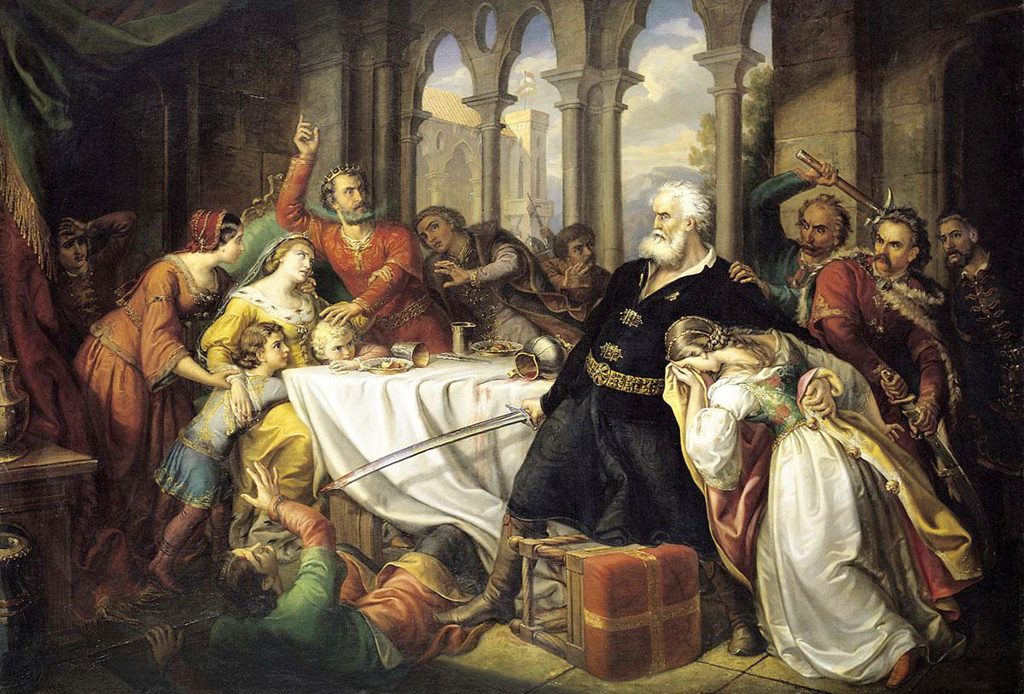
Felician Záh tries to kill the Hungarian royal family (Soma Orlai Petrich)

The gens provided several high dignitaries in the era of Árpáds, including Nicholas, son of Borsa who served as ispán (Count; comes) of Sopron County between 1221 and 1233. Conrad, son of Albős (c. 1240–1269) was ispán of Győr County and chief cellarer for the Queen. Job functioned as bishop of Pécs from 1252 until c. 1282 and ispán of Moson County since 1272. He was the uncle of Felician Záh.

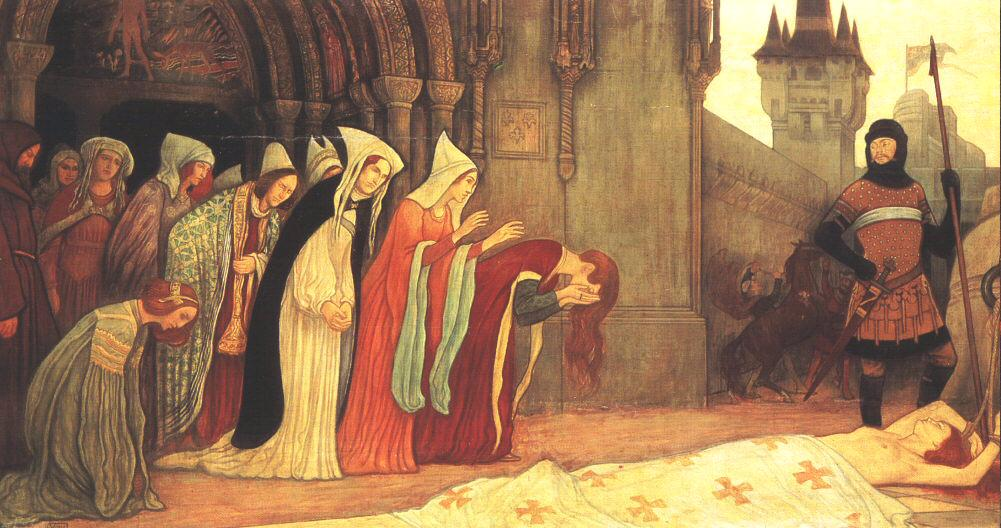
Murder of Klara Záh (Aladár Körösfői-Kriesch)

The clan divided into two branches: the first one had estates in Transdanubia, Tolna, Somogy and Baranya Counties. The second one remained landowner in Nógrád County. Felician belonged to the Nógrád branch. He was a supporter of Matthew Csák.

== Notable members ==
- Job from the kindred Záh (13th century), Bishop of Pécs (1252 – before 1282), Chancellor (1278)
- Felician from the kindred Záh (died 17 April 1330, Visegrád), who attempted to kill Charles I of Hungary and the entire royal family. Elizabeth of Poland, Queen of Hungary was seriously injured in the attack when she tried to protect her sons, princes Louis and Andrew. The members of the royal guard and John Pataki, the deputy master of the stewards for the Queen stopped and killed the assassin. The cause of the assassination attempt is disputed. According to some, the attack was part of the oligarchs' conspiracy. However the historiography accept the words of an Italian chronicler, who remembered the tragic events fifteen years later. Accordingly, Queen Elizabeth's younger brother, Prince Casimir, future King of Poland, allegedly seduced Klara Záh and her father wanted revenge for that.
- Klara from the kindred Záh, after the assassination attempt, she was brutally executed. The other members of the clan were also murdered or imprisoned. Some children from the clan were banished to Rhodes.

== Sources ==
- János Karácsonyi: A magyar nemzetségek a XIV. század közepéig. Budapest: Magyar Tudományos Akadémia. 1900–1901.
- Gyula Kristó (editor): Korai Magyar Történeti Lexikon - 9-14. század (Encyclopedia of the Early Hungarian History - 9-14th centuries); Akadémiai Kiadó, 1994, Budapest; ISBN 963-05-6722-9.
