= John Albeni (ban) =

Hungarian noble of German descent

John Albeni de Alben et Medve (Croatian: Ivan Alben; died after 15 August 1420) was a Hungarian noble of German descent, who served as Ban of Croatia and Dalmatia between May 1414 and April 1419.

The family came into Hungary with Sigismund of Luxembourg. He was a son of Rudolf Albeni. He had five brothers, including John, Sr., Peter and Henry, and three sisters. He had no children. His appointment to the position of ban (viceroy) was due to his influential uncle, bishop of Zagreb Eberhard Albeni. John took part in the Council of Constance (1414–1415).

After his uncle's death he lost his office and was replaced by Ivan Nelipčić.

John Albeni (ban) Died: after 15 August 1420
Political offices
Preceded by Peter Albeni	Ban of Croatia and Dalmatia; 1414–1419	Succeeded by Ivan Nelipčić
