= Hucín =

Village and municipality in Slovakia

Hucín Gice
- Municipality
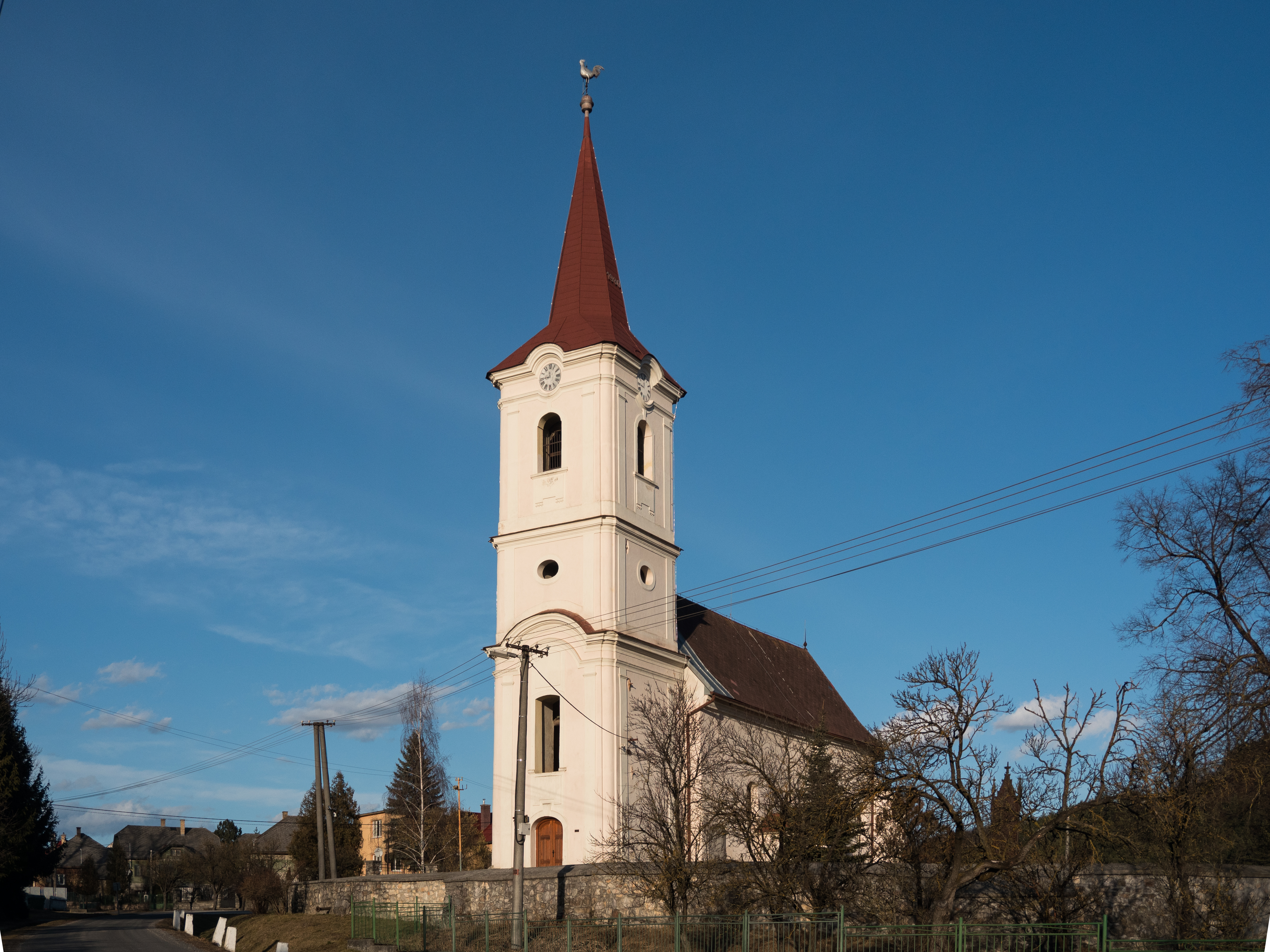

- Flag Coat of arms

- Location of Hucín in the Banská Bystrica Region Location of Hucín in Slovakia
- Coordinates: 48.57°N 20.30°E
- Country: Slovakia
- Region: Banská Bystrica Region
- District: Revúca District
- First mentioned: 1327

Area
  - Total: 12.55 km^{2} (4.85 sq mi)
- Elevation: 221 m (725 ft)

Population (2025)
  - Total: 914
- Time zone: UTC+1 (CET)
  - Summer (DST): UTC+2 (CEST)
- Postal code: 491 3
- Area code: +421 58
- Vehicle registration plate (until 2022): RA
- Website: obechucin.sk/samosprava/

Hucín (German: Hutzendorf; Hungarian: Gice) is a village and municipality in Revúca District in the Banská Bystrica Region of Slovakia.

== Geography ==
The municipality lies at an altitude of 221 metres (725 ft) and covers an area of 12.55 km^{2} (4.85 sq mi) (2025).

== History ==
In historical records, the village was first mentioned in 1327 (1327 Gyuche, 1418 Gyche, 1565 Hwczyn, 1566 Huczin Dorf, 1580 Hwsin). It belonged to local feudatories Gizey. Some Germans established here in the 16th century. From 1938 to 1945 it was annexed by Hungary.

== Population ==
Population statistic (10 years)
Year	1995	2005	2015	2025
Count	787	792	907	914
Difference		+0.63%	+14.52%	+0.77%

Population statistic
Year	2024	2025
Count	915	914
Difference		−0.10%

It has a population of 914 people (31 December 2025).

=== Ethnicity ===
Census 2021 (1+ %)
Ethnicity	Number	Fraction
Slovak	780	83.06%
Romani	206	21.93%
Hungarian	180	19.16%
Not found out	50	5.32%
Total	939	

In year 2021 was 939 people by ethnicity 780 as Slovak, 206 as Romani, 180 as Hungarian, 50 as Not found out, 1 as Czech and 1 as Russian.

Note on population: The difference values of population numbers in the table "Population statistic" and in the sections "Ethnicity" & "Religion" is caused by the use of various statistical methods.

The vast majority of the municipality's population consists of the local Roma community. In 2019, they constituted an estimated 81% of the local population.

=== Religion ===
Census 2021 (1+ %)
Religion	Number	Fraction
None	576	61.34%
Calvinist Church	99	10.54%
Jehovah's Witnesses	92	9.8%
Roman Catholic Church	90	9.58%
Not found out	38	4.05%
Evangelical Church	22	2.34%
Total	939	

In year 2021 was 939 people by religion 576 from None, 99 from Calvinist Church, 92 from Jehovah's Witnesses, 90 from Roman Catholic Church, 38 from Not found out, 22 from Evangelical Church, 9 from Other and not ascertained christian church, 8 from Greek Catholic Church, 2 from Other, 1 from Old Catholic Church, 1 from Christian Congregations in Slovakia and 1 from Buddhism.

== Genealogical resources ==
The records for genealogical research are available at the state archive "Statny Archiv in Kosice, Slovakia"

- Roman Catholic church records (births/marriages/deaths): 1779-1899 (parish B)
- Lutheran church records (births/marriages/deaths): 1784-1897 (parish B)
- Reformated church records (births/marriages/deaths): 1757-1900 (parish A)

== See also ==
- List of municipalities and towns in Slovakia
