= Bartholomew le Gros =

French prelate

- Bishop of Pécs
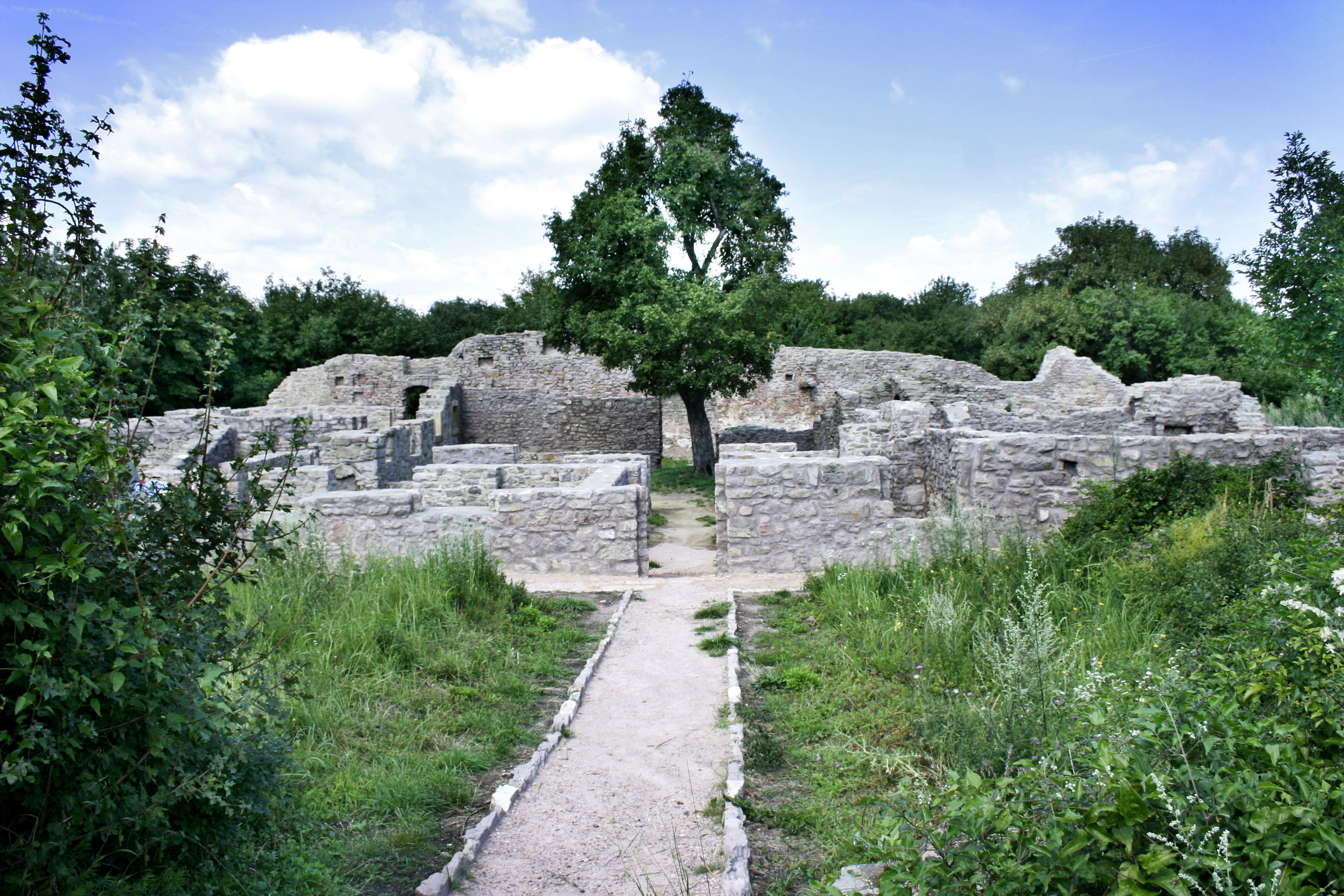
- Ruins of the Saint James Hill Monastery founded by Bishop Bartholomew
- Province: Esztergom
- Diocese: Pécs
- Appointed: 1219
- Term ended: 1251
- Predecessor: Kalán
- Successor: Achilles

Personal details
- Born: before 1189
- Died: after 1253
- Denomination: Roman Catholic

Bartholomew le Gros or Bartholomew Grossus (Hungarian: Gros Bertalan pécsi püspök) was a prelate of French origin in the Kingdom of Hungary in the 13th century. He left his homeland for Hungary in the retinue of Yolanda de Courtenay, queen of Andrew II of Hungary in 1216 or 1217. Bartholomew was bishop of Pécs between 1219 and 1251, but he spent a significant part of this period on diplomatic missions. He returned to his family estates in 1247 and resigned from the bishopric some year before his death around 1254.

== Life ==
=== Early life ===
Bartholomew was the third son of Henri le Gros, lord of Brancion and Uxelles in Burgundy by his wife, Beatrix of Vignory. A younger son, Bartholomew was dedicated to ecclesiastical carrier. He escorted Yolande de Courtaney, bride to King Andrew II of Hungary to her new homeland at the turn of 1216 and 1217.

King Andrew II appointed Bartholomew bishop of Pécs in 1219 after the death of Bishop Kalán. The canons of the cathedral chapter of Pécs attempted to prevent Bartholomew's installation by stating that he was too young for this position, but an official inquiry ordered by the Holy See ascertained that the new bishop had already attained 30 years, the age required by canon law. The same inquiry, however, revealed that Bartholomew's education was imperfect, so the pope ordered him to employ a magister until improving his knowledge. Bartholomew fulfilled this requirement in two years.

=== Bishop of Pécs ===
"Bishop Bartholomew, bishop of Pécs, seeing the destruction of the army and noticing that some Tatars were attacking the army and torching the camp at several points, took to flight with many of his warriors, similarly not by the highway but across the fields. When some Tatars sent their horses at full gallop after them, ispán Ladislas, who was hastening to the king with his troop under unfurled flags, suddenly came upon them, knowing nothing of what had happened. The bishop, recognizing the Hungarian flags, turned to the ispán, and the Tatars, noticing the great numbers, retreated and pursued others. Thus the bishop, departing together with the ispán, escaped from their hands."

— Roger of Torre Maggiore:
Epistle to the Sorrowful Lament

He was appointed eight times between 1223 and 1239 to decide in court cases, which proves that he had by that time made himself master of canon law. Bartholomew himself was involved in a debate over the borders between his diocese and the archdiocese of Kalocsa. He even attempted to acquire the right of patronage over the abbey at Sremska Mitrovica (now in Serbia) by using a falsified charter.

Bartholomew established a monastery at the Saint James Hill at Pécs for the hermits, up to that time scattered in the Mecsek Hills. A short regulation allegedly written by Bishop Bartholomew for the monastery is presented in the 16th-century work on the history of the Order of Saint Paul the First Hermit by Gergely Gyöngyösi, but the authenticity of the text is debated. Bartholomew also built a parish church dedicated to Saint James which contributed to the formation of a core territory in Pécs, a town consisting of smaller independent communities. He accompanied Archbishop Robert of Esztergom to a group of Cumans who had decided to receive baptism to the territories east of the Carpathian Mountains in 1227. He also assisted the military expeditions Duke Coloman of Slavonia launched against the heretics in Bosnia in the 1230s. Bartholomew's evangelical ardour is also reflected by the introduction of the Franciscans and Dominicans in Pécs in his time.

Bartholomew visited the court of Aragon four times between 1229 and 1235 in order to make arrangements for the planned marriage of Princess Yolanda of Hungary (a daughter of King Andrew II by Queen Yolanda) to King James I of Aragon. Moreover, Bartholomew prepared the first draft to the prenuptial agreement in 1233 and performed the ceremony in 1235. In the meantime, he also visited his homeland and made a donation of 12 marks of gold for the Cluny Abbey.

Along with other prelates, Bishop Bartholomew personally led his troops against the invading Mongols in the Battle of Mohi in 1241. He only escaped from the battlefield when he saw that the battle had been lost. Although the Mongols were chasing after the bishop, his life was saved by the intervention of Ladislaus from the kindred Kán, head of Somogy County. Bartholomew fled to Split in Dalmatia where he stayed with King Béla IV of Hungary and his family who also survived the second phase of the Mongol invasion in the seaside town. Following the withdrawal of the Mongols from Hungary, Bishop Bartholomew was often appointed by the monarch to lead diplomatic missions. First he unsuccessfully attempted to mediate a peace between Split and Trogir in 1244.

=== Last years ===
King Béla IV sent Bartholomew to Lyon in 1247 in order to seek assistance from Pope Innocent IV against a planned new Mongol invasion. Back in his homeland, Bartholomew settled in his family estates and never returned to his see. He even decided to resign his office in 1251.

Although the pope promised him a life annuity of 200 marks of silver from the revenues of the diocese of Pécs, Bartholomew did not receive this income for two years. Therefore he again visited the pope, now in Assisi (Italy). The pope, however, took into account the financial difficulties in Bartholomew's former diocese caused by the Mongol invasion and reduced his income to 100 marks of silver. The last record on the retired bishop is dated to the spring of 1254 when he sold three houses in Paris.

== See also ==
- Mongol invasion of Europe

== Other reading ==
- Archdeacon Thomas of Split: History of the Bishops of Salona and Split (Edited, translated and annotated by Damir Karbić, Mirjana Matijević Sokol, and James Ross Sweeney) (2006). CEU Press. Budapest and New York. ISBN 963-7326-59-6.
- (in French) Koszta, László (1996). Un prélat français de Hongrie: Bertalan, évêque de Pécs (1219–1251) ("A French prelate in Hungary: Bertalan, bishop of Pécs (1219–1251)"). In: Cahiers d'Etudes Hongroises 8 (1996), pp. 71-96.

Bartholomew le Gros Born: b. 1189 Died: a. 1253
Catholic Church titles
Preceded by Kalán	Bishop of Pécs; 1219–1251	Succeeded by Achilles
