= John Albeni (bishop) =

Hungarian prelate of German descent

John Albeni, OSB
- Bishop of Pécs
- Province: Esztergom
- Diocese: Pécs
- Appointed: 23 April 1410
- Installed: 10 June 1410
- Term ended: 10 August 1420
- Predecessor: sede vacante (1408–1410)
- Successor: Henry Albeni
- Other post: Bishop of Zagreb (1421–1433)

Personal details
- Born: Meisenheim, Holy Roman Empire (?)
- Died: March or May 1433 Pécs, Kingdom of Hungary
- Denomination: Roman Catholic

John Albeni de Alben et Medve (Croatian: Ivan Alben; died March or May 1433) was a Hungarian prelate of German descent, who served as bishop of Pécs in the Kingdom of Hungary from 1410 to 1420 and as bishop of Zagreb in the Kingdom of Croatia within the Kingdom of Hungary from 1421 until his death. The family came into Hungary with Sigismund of Luxembourg. He was a son of Rudolf Albeni. He had five brothers, including John Jr., Peter and Henry, and three sisters.

John Albeni (bishop) Died: c. Spring 1433
Catholic Church titles
Preceded by sede vacante	Bishop of Pécs; 1410–1420	Succeeded by Henry Albeni
Preceded by Eberhard Albeni	Bishop of Zagreb; 1421–1433	Succeeded by Abel of Curzola
