= Diocese of Pécs =

Latin Catholic diocese in Hungary

Coordinates: 46.0786°N 18.2236°E

Diocese of Pécs Dioecesis Quinque Ecclesiensis Pécsi Egyházmegye

Catholic

Location
- Country: Hungary
- Ecclesiastical province: Kalocsa-Kecskemét
- Metropolitan: Archdiocese of Kalocsa-Kecskemét

Statistics
- Area: 8,200 km^{2} (3,200 sq mi)
- Population: Total; Catholics: (as of 2013); 664,000; 439,000 (66.1%)

Information
- Denomination: Catholic Church
- Sui iuris church: Latin Church
- Rite: Roman Rite
- Established: 1009
- Cathedral: Cathedral Basilica of St Peter and St Paul in Pécs

Current leadership
- Pope: Leo XIV
- Bishop: László Felföldi
- Metropolitan Archbishop: Balázs Bábel
- Vicar General: Frigyes Kvanduk
- Episcopal Vicars: Ferenc Pavlekovics
- Bishops emeritus: Mihály Mayer

Map
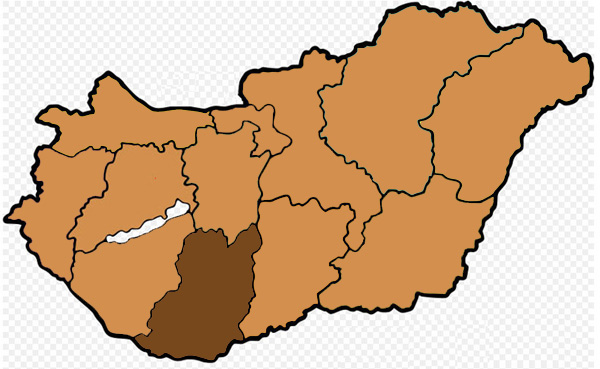
- Map of the Diocese

Website
- Website of the Diocese

The Diocese of Pécs (Hungarian: Pécsi Egyházmegye, Latin: Dioecesis Quinque Ecclesiensis) is a Latin Church diocese of the Catholic church in Hungary. The Cathedral of Pécs is dedicated to Saint Peter and Saint Paul.

== Secular offices connected to the bishopric ==
The Bishops of Pécs were perpetual ispáns of Baranya (Hungarian: Baranya vármegye örökös főispánja, Latin: Baraniensis perpetuus supremus comes) from the 16th century until 1777.

== List of the bishops of Pécs ==
- Bonipert (1009–1036)
- St Maurus (1036–c. 1075)
- Stephen I (c. 1093)
- Simon (c. 1108–b. 1136)
- Nana (c. 1135)
- Macarius I (b. 1138–b. 1143)
- John I (b. 1143–c. 1148)
- Antimius (c. 1148–c. 1158)
- Macarius II (b. 1162–1186)
- Kalán from the kindred Bár-Kalán (1186–1218)
- Bartholomew le Gros (1219–1251)
- Achilles from the kindred Hont-Pázmány (1251–1252)
- Job from the kindred Záh (1252–b. 1282)
  - Sede vacante (1282–1293)
- Paul Balog (1293–1306)
- Manfred (elected, but not consecrated) (1306)
- Peter I (1306–1314)
- Ladislaus Kórógyi (1314–1345)
- Nicholas Neszmélyi (1346–1360)
- William of Koppenbach (1361–1374)
- Bálint Alsáni (1374–1408)
  - Sede vacante (1408–1410)
- John Albeni (1410–1420)
- Henry Albeni (1421–1444)
- Andrew Kálnói (1445–1455)
- Nicholas Barius (1455–1459)
- Janus Pannonius (1459–1472)
- Sigismund Ernuszt (1473–1505)
- George Szatmári (1505–1522)
- Szaniszló Várallyai † ( 1541 Appointed – 21 Apr 1548 Died)
- Antun Vrančić (Antal Verancsics) † ( 1554 Appointed – 1557 Appointed, Bishop of Eger)
- György Draskovics † (17 Jul 1560 Appointed – 22 Mar 1564 Confirmed, Bishop of Zagreb (Agram))
- Mikuláš Telegdy † ( 1579 Appointed – 22 Apr 1586 Died)
- Nikola Stepanić Selnički (1596–1598)
- Johannes Pyber de Gyerkény † (29 Jul 1613 Appointed – 7 Apr 1631 Appointed, Bishop of Eger)
- Benedikt Vinković † (6 Jun 1633 Appointed – 28 Apr 1642 Confirmed, Bishop of Zagreb (Agram))
- István Bosnyák † (14 Jul 1642 Confirmed – 23 Sep 1644 Died)
- György Széchényi † (6 May 1647 Appointed – 9 Jun 1653 Appointed, Bishop of Veszprém)
- Pál Hoffmann † (3 Aug 1655 Appointed – 24 Jun 1659 Died)
- Ján Salix O. Cist. † (21 Nov 1661 Confirmed – Mar 1668 Died)
- Ján Gubasóczy † ( 1668 Appointed – 1676 Appointed, Bishop of Vác)
- Pál Széchényi O.S.P.P.E. † (18 Apr 1678 Confirmed – 24 Nov 1687 Appointed, Bishop of Veszprém)
- Mátyás Ignác Radanay † (7 Sep 1689 Confirmed – Apr 1703 Died)
- Wilhelm Franz Johann Bertrand von Nesselrode † (21 Jul 1710 Confirmed – 29 Sep 1732 Died)
- Anton von Thurn und Valsassina † (2 Mar 1733 Appointed – 25 Dec 1734 Died)
- Juan Álvaro Cienfuegos Villazón, S.J. † (15 Nov 1735 Appointed – 18 Aug 1739 Died)
- Zsigmond József Berényi † (30 Sep 1740 Appointed – 25 Sep 1748 Died)
- György Klimó † (15 Nov 1751 Appointed – 2 May 1777 Died)
- Pál László Esterházy † (2 Apr 1781 Appointed – 7 Nov 1799 Died)
- József Király † (11 Jan 1808 Appointed – 17 Jul 1825 Died)
- Ignác Szepesy de Négyes † (11 Jan 1828 Appointed – 16 Jul 1838 Died)
- János Scitovszky † (18 Feb 1839 Appointed – 28 Sep 1849 Appointed, Archbishop of Esztergom)
- György Girk † (10 Mar 1853 Confirmed – 24 Nov 1868 Died)
- Zsigmond Kovács † (25 Jun 1869 Appointed – 25 Jun 1877 Appointed, Bishop of Veszprém)
- Nándor Dulánszky † (25 Jun 1877 Confirmed – 24 Jan 1896 Died)
- Sámuel Hetyey de Eadem † (14 Dec 1897 Appointed – 1 Sep 1903 Died)
- Gyula Zichy † (11 Dec 1905 Appointed – 31 Aug 1925 Appointed, Archbishop of Kalocsa)
- Ferenc Virág † (27 Mar 1926 Appointed – 2 Mar 1958 Died)
- Ferenc Rogacs † (2 Mar 1958 Succeeded – 20 Feb 1961 Died)
- József Cserháti † (10 Jan 1969 Appointed – 3 Nov 1989 Retired)
- Mihály Mayer (3 Nov 1989 Appointed – 19 Jan 2011 Retired)
- György Udvardy (9 Apr 2011 Appointed – July 11, 2019 Appointed, Archbishop of Veszprém)
- Laszlo Felföldi (November 18, 2020 Appointed - )

=== Auxiliary bishops ===
- József Petheö † (24 July 1797 – 3 July 1809 Died)

== Sources ==
- Korai Magyar Történeti Lexikon (9-14. század), főszerkesztő: Kristó, Gyula, szerkesztők: Engel, Pál és Makk, Ferenc (Akadémiai Kiadó, Budapest, 1994)
- Fallenbüchl, Zoltán: Magyarország főispánjai 1526-1848 (Argumentum, Budapest, 1994)
- Magyarország Történeti Kronológiája I-III. – A kezdetektől 1526-ig; 1526-1848, 1848-1944, főszerkesztő: Benda, Kálmán (Akadémiai Kiadó, Budapest, 1981, 1982, 1993)
- Magyar Történelmi Fogalomtár I-II. – A-K; L-ZS, főszerkesztő: Bán, Péter (Gondolat, Budapest, 1989)
- Fallenbüchl, Zoltán: Magyarország főméltóságai (Maecenas, 1988)
