= Csatár =

- Village
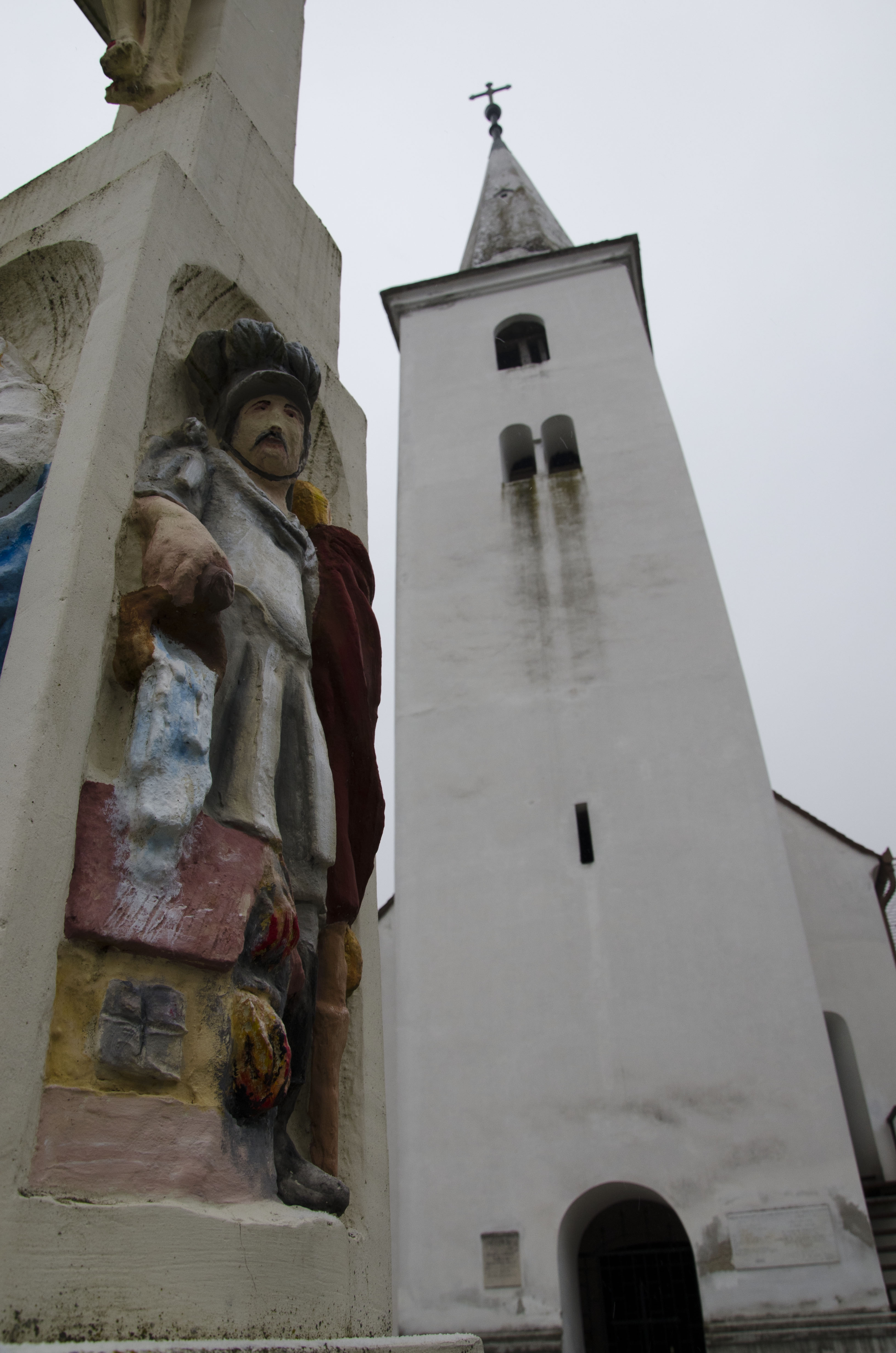
- Catholic church of Csatár with a stone cross in the foreground from 1817.

- Flag Coat of arms

- Location of Csatár
- Coordinates: 46.7777°N 16.86406°E
- Country: Hungary
- Region: Western Transdanubia
- County: Zala
- District: Zalaegerszeg

Area
  - Total: 7.79 km^{2} (3.01 sq mi)

Population (1 January 2025)
  - Total: 534
  - Density: 68.5/km^{2} (178/sq mi)
- Time zone: UTC+1 (CET)
  - Summer (DST): UTC+2 (CEST)
- Postal code: 8942
- Area code: (+36) 92
- Website: csatar.hu

Csatár is a village in Zala County, Hungary.
