= St Martin's Cathedral (Spišská Kapitula) =

Cathedral of St Martin
- Katedrála svätého Martina
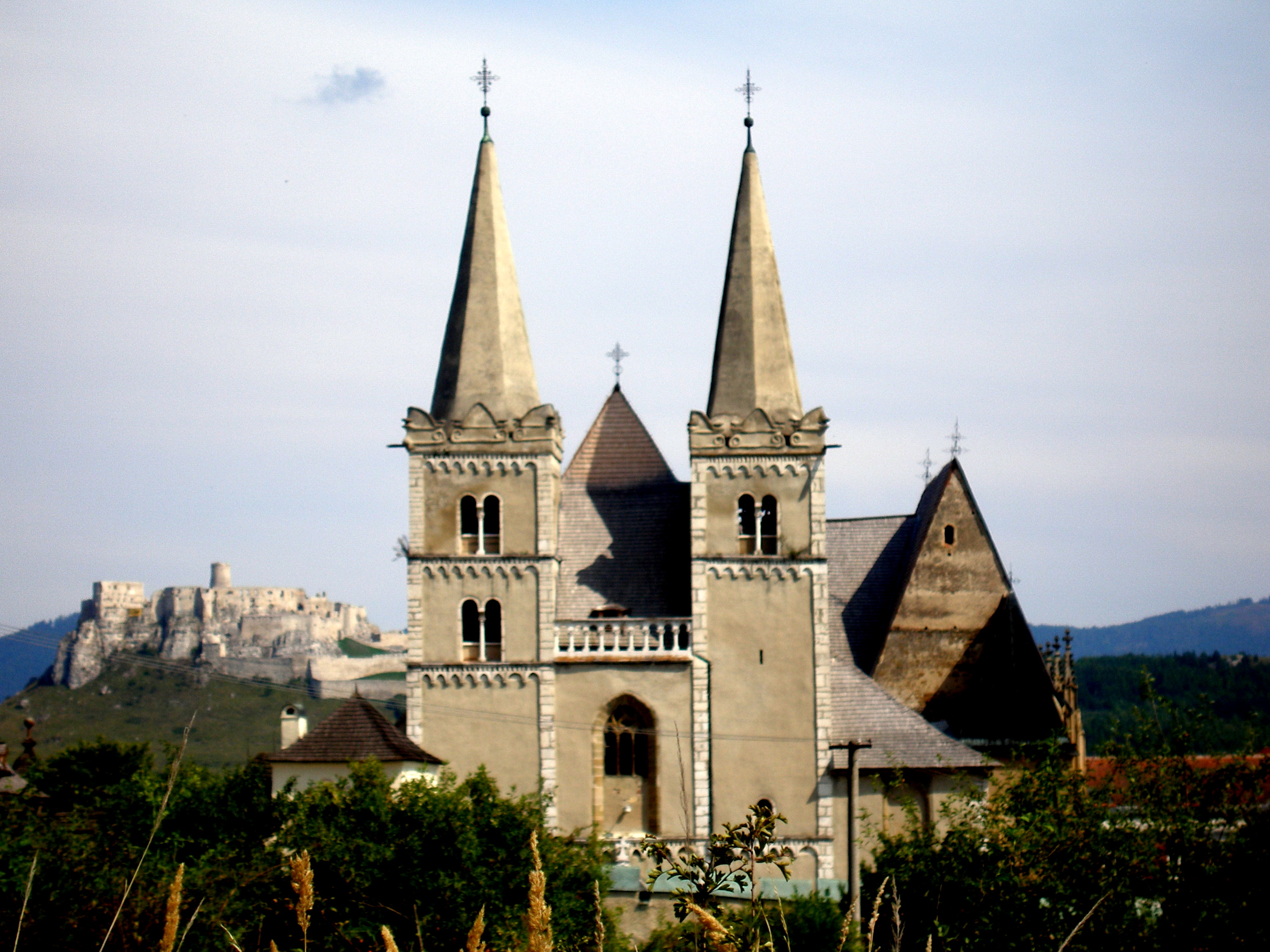

- Location in Slovakia
- 49°00′02″N 20°44′27″E
- Location: Spišská Kapitula
- Country: Slovakia
- Denomination: Roman Catholic

History
- Status: Active
- Dedication: St Martin of Tours
- Dedicated: 1478

Architecture
- Functional status: Cathedral

Administration
- Diocese: Spiš

Clergy
- Bishop(s): Diocese bishop Mons. František Trstenský, auxiliary interim Ján Kuboš, auxiliary emeritus Andrej Imrich

St Martin's Cathedral (Spišská Kapitula) is a cathedral in Slovakia. It is located in the town of Spišská Kapitula and is the cathedral church of the Spiš diocese.

== History ==
The cathedral was built between the 13th and 15th centuries in the Romanesque and Gothic styles. It is one of the largest and most interesting Romanesque monuments in Slovakia. It contains many medieval carved altars and is the resting place of many lords of Spiš Castle; the 15th century carved marble tombstones of the Zápolya family are of exceptional quality.

A recently restored wall-painting from 1317 depicts the coronation of Charles Robert of Anjou as the King of Hungary; another painting in the cathedral is the source for the provisional name of the anonymous Master of Kirchdrauf.

Spišská Kapitula became the main seat of the church administration in the region in the 12th century. In 1776 it became the seat of the Diocese of Spiš, after Hungarian queen Maria Theresa split the Diocese of Eger (now Archidiocese of Eger).

Spišská Kapitula was visited by Pope John Paul II in 1995.

== The building ==
The Bishop's Cathedral is the central building of Spišská Kapitula. It was built in a combined late-Romanesque and late-Gothic style between 1245 and 1273, on the site of an older 12th-century church. The construction of the cathedral can be classified into three main building phases, also well visible in the architecture of the building. The first phase was the Romanesque basilica, which was built in the first half of the 13th century.

The interior space consisted of three naves of varying height, but with the same width of each nave, with the middle nave being twice as tall and had a basilic light. Each nave had two bays and was finished with a semicircular apse. The matroneum is adjacent to the back of the cathedral and two Romanesque towers dominate the western side. The ground floor of the matroneum has massive Romanesque cross-vaults resting on richly-shaped Romanesque columns. Above the ground floor is the matroneum with a choir. The Romanesque wall has retained the northern wall with an entrance portal and a narrow window, and also part of the eastern wall with a Romanesque victory arch.

The western Romanesque portal was restored in the Neo-Romananesque style in the 19th century. The construction of the Romanesque basilica was completed in 1273 when a second tower was built.

In 1433, the church was damaged and in 1462 it was rebuilt under the leadership of Johann Stock. After his death in 1464, it was under the leadership by Caspar Beck, the new provost of Spiš. During this period, a new Gothic presbytery was built and aisles were elevated to the level of the nave, this becoming the three-naves halls of the original basilica. Aisles were given a star vault. In 1478, the church was officially consecrated. All eleven altars were sanctified at the church. The completion in 1497 would expose the vault of the northern vault with the coat of arms of Caspar Beck.

At the end of the 15th century (1488-1493), the owner of Spišský castle and later the Spiš district administrator became the Zápolya family, which built a new Gothic chapel in the church of St. Martin's. The chapel was built on the site of the smaller Chapel of the Holy Body of Christ (1382). In style it imitates the chapel in the Church of St. Ladislav in Spišský Štvrtok, but it does not reach its architectural perfection, slenderness and beauty. Probably it was made by masters from Košice, who took part in the construction of the St. Elisabeth Cathedral in Košice. The chapel space is linked to the church by two open arcades. It features high Gothic windows and fine mesh vaults. The chapel has two separate sacristy, as well as its own matroneum with a Late-Gothic tract in the handrail.

Two hundred years ago, the basilica became too small for the number of worshippers and was considerably remodelled.

Other building reconstructions have been of secondary importance. At the beginning of the 18th century, in 1706, Baroque sacristy was created. In years 1777 - 1779 the church was renovated and in years 1873 to 1889 the cathedral under the leadership of F. Storno was regrouped and expanded with the southern lateral annexation. The western and northern portals were restored in the Neo-Romanesque style.

During its existence, the church went through many structural modifications. Its current appearance was given in the 15th century. In connection with the formation of the bishopric in 1776, the building modifications were made, leaving a significant footprint on the interior, when, among other things, the Western organ matroneum was extended to the detriment of the Roman nave. In the second half of the 19th century, modifications were made in the Neo-Gothic spirit. In the 20th century, restoration took place in 1937 even in the 1970s. Between 2006 and 2007, research was carried out here, which among other things revealed the original form of the building and revealed the older tombs under the Romanesque part.

== Cathedral Architecture ==
The Cathedral of St. Martin combines several architectural styles from different periods, complemented by contemporary architectural form and historical, artistic and documentary value during the construction stages and the development of the building. The Romanesque and Gothic style prevails in the building, complementing them perfectly.

Among the main Romanesque features are the original western choir, underneath the six crosses of the cross ribbed vault, merging with the inscriptions on the richly shaped Romanesque pillars. The column heads are richly decorated with a bauble and acanthus pattern and point to the Italian influence and a possible Italian author of the basilica.

The original southern portal retained a statue of the stone lion, which was part of the lower part of the brass. The original Romanesque westwork is divided by a horizontal dentil and a swirl frieze, the towers have double windows with a central pillar with a cube and a bauble head. The western portal consists of three rectangular offset into which are embedded pillars bearing a semi-circular archivolt, and is solved in the form of a flat avant-corps with a triangular shield and a swirl frieze. The appearance of this portal was changed by reconstruction in the 19th century, when its Neo-Romanesque edicule was added.

The Gothic presbytery with an elongated polygonally finished floor plan has a mesh vaulting with profiled ribs, like the new Gothic vault of the main nave, the transversally Gothic Revival naves of the hall of the church have a master star vault. The presbytery was equipped with a rare stone pastoforium, with a preserved original metal lattice. The nave is opened by a triumphal arch preserved from the Romanesque period and two lateral arches in the eastern wall to the side aisle.

To the south wall there was a floor building of a sacristy with a library on the floor. Access to the library archive is through a circular staircase built into a pillar at the corner of the northern nave with an entrance to the Late-Gothic portal.

The Zápoľský Chapel, situated on the south side of the church, has a rectangular, polygonally closed base and a fine mesh vault. It is built in a Late-Gothic style, as evidenced by the Late-Gothic stone tract on the balustrade of the Western choir. Typical are also high Late-Gothic windows remaining the double storey burial chapel of Zápolský family in Spišský Štvrtok, which was built first and according to that chapel the Chapel of Zápoľský in Spišská Kapitula was designed.

The Baroque adaptation focused in particular on the restoration of the plaster and the roof, the construction of a new pavement and the removal of the Protestant epitaphs. From this period is also the Baroque sacristy from the northern side of the Gothic presbytery with Prussian vaults. In 1630, they equipped the nave and the benches whose rails bear carved reliefs of an incredibly high artistic level. On the walls we can admire the funerary shields of important celebrities of the 17th century.

During the Gothic revival under the direction of František Storn, new plasters and new Gothic elements were built as a balustrade between the towers and the incorporation of new additional parts, new paving was laid and in 1880 the windows were squeezed by the design of Albert Jele and made new portals. The northern portal imitates the architecture of the western portal, which has been supplemented with new Neo-Romanesque elements, the other portals were regrouped (brothers Hennels). Grilles between the presbytery and the nave were designed by architects J. Lippert, F. Dabert, and J. Hanula completed the demolition in 1888. At the same time, they renewed the altars and the interior in the spirit of purist Gothic Revival - the original Baroque facilities were removed, the altars were given new Gothic chambers and shields (except the Altar of the Coronation of Mary however, the redevelopment purification has also hit the rare Gothic fresco above the northern portal in the interior, whose historical theme has not been fully supplemented. At present the object of Spišská Kapitula is well preserved and it is one of the most beautiful monuments of the cultural heritage in Slovakia.

=== Wall paintings ===
Only one medieval wall painting was preserved in the cathedral. It was discovered in the 1950s and partially restored in the spirit of purism. A massive painted tempera work is placed above the smaller Romanesque portal. It was painted in 1317 by Henry's Spišský provost. The painting depicts the crowning of Charles I of Hungary.

=== Windows ===
The 15th-century Gothic stone traceries are filled with stained glasses from the late 19th century made in Innsbruck. They depict the life and activity of St. Martin and his Patron Saint George: one window only has a wallpaper pattern.

=== Altars ===
The current altars come from the 15th century and later. The device consisted of thirteen altars, later were added other. These are the altar-cubicles decorated with coins and table-top paintings that all have the greatest value. In the 17th century the altars were Baroque, while in the 19th century five original altars were added.

Current altars include:

- The High Altar of St. Martin (the main altar) - consecrated in 1478, in the 19th century it was regrouped. From the original altar, only the paintings of movable and solid wings were preserved in their original state. These are the work of the Spiš Master. Here are the modified central statues of Mary with St. Martin, radically cut and regrouped. On the four front panels, three figures of royal saints and saints are depicted, the eight tables of the closed altar displaying the Passion Cycle. The altar was probably made by King Matthias Corvinus, which confirms the symbol of the black raven with a ring in the beak - a symbol of the Corvinus genus, Osvald.
- The Altar of the Adoration of the Magi - installed in 1497. It shows the praise of the Three Kings of Jesus and the Holy Family. King Caspar kisses the foot of Jesus, and is apparently the image of Caspar Beck. The Church is portrayed by the Christ on the grave with the Virgin Mary, the evangelist John and the angel, the various saints on the surrounding paintings.
- The Altar of Mary's Dormition, created in the years 1470 - 1478, depicts Mary falling into the faint in the arms of St. John the Evangelist, surrounded by apostles. Despite the overlay, the altar kept the emotional urgency and the depth of the message. The scenes continues under the traceried curtain, the figure of Christ bearing the soul of Mary together with the two angels. The allegory is complemented by the coronation of the Mary on the Neo-Gothic pedestal. The paintings depict the Hungarian patrons.
- The Altar of the Coronation of Mary - stands in the chapel of Zápoľsky since 1490. The celebration of Christ's mother concentrates on Mary surrounded by a Holy Trio with a floating crown above her head. The celebration of Mary is portrayed in the paintings of the Marian cycle, on the eight images of the closed altar are Christ's Passion. The whole altar is crowned by a flying, dentelle-aerated canopy.
- The Pieta Altar - Neo-Gothic altar on the southern wall of the Chapel of Zápoľský.
- The Altar of St. Archangel Michael - originated around 1470. On the central board, the Archangel Michael is portrayed with scales in the hand, weighing the merits of the souls of the dead at the Last Judgement. On the wings of the altar are the images of the church fathers.
- The Altar of The Holy Cross - from 1629, is located in the western Romanesque part of the temple below the southern tower. It is one of the rare examples of mannerism altars in Spiš. The three-part altar emerges from the Gothic concept, depicting the crucifixion of Christ and, on the side, angels holding instruments of torture. There is an original picture of the celebration. At the bottom it is the entombment of Christ.
- The Altar of the Sacred Heart of Jesus - the youngest altar in the cathedral dating back to 1902, carries the typical elements of a Neo-Gothic style from the early 20th century. In the center is a statue of Jesus Christ, to the left of which is a small Mary and her mother, Saint Anna, on the right is St. Margaret Mary Alacoque.

=== Cathedral furnishings ===
There are various free sculptures, paintings, funerary shields, epitaphs in the cathedral. Today, the cathedral's appearance is largely the result of a 19th-century restoration. The confession booths come from the same period. From the older period there are benches that are found in naves. They are Early-Baroque from 1630 and have rich ornaments. They have carved reliefs, which depict the birth of Christ, Adoration of the Magi, the flight of the Holy Family to Egypt and Christ on the Mount of Olives. The church today has three organs today. All of them are new and have Neo-Gothic cabinets. The Zápoľský Chapel has an organ from 1873. The painting of the sanctuary vault is from 1888 and is by Felix Dabert.
