= Co-Cathedral of Our Lady of Sorrows, Poprad =

Roman Catholic church in Poprad, Slovakia

Coordinates: 49.056148°N 20.29737°E

The Co-Cathedral of Our Lady of Sorrows (Slovak: Konkatedrála Sedembolestnej Panny Márie) is the main Roman Catholic church of the town of Poprad, Slovakia.

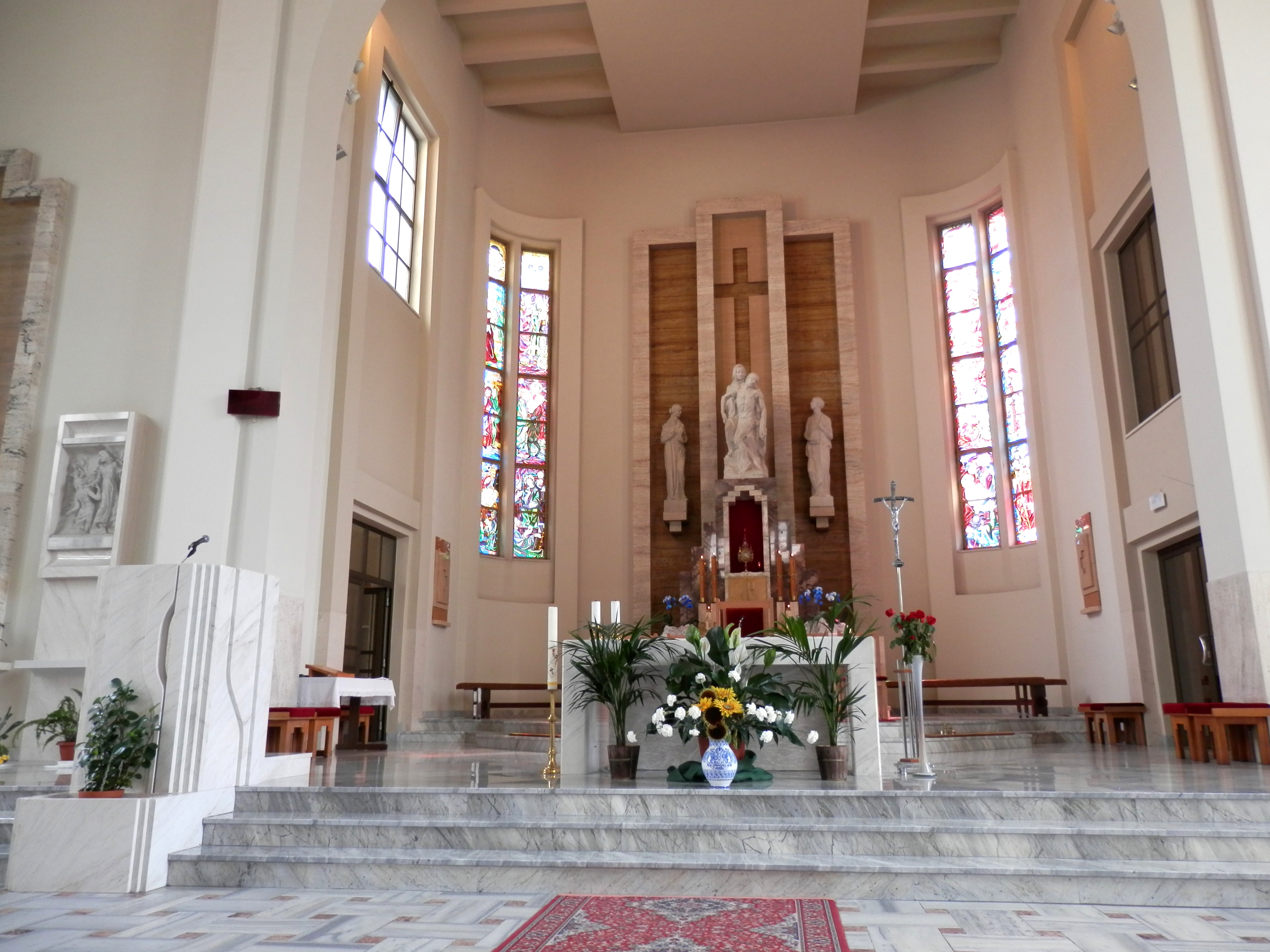
Internal view

== History ==
It was built between 1939 and 1942. The church is 48 m long and 22 m wide. The title "concathedral" refers to the fact, that it is the second cathedral in the Diocese of Spiš, after St. Martin's Cathedral in Spišská Kapitula.
