= Andrej Imrich =

Slovak Roman Catholic bishop (born 1948)

His Excellency, The Most Reverend Andrej Imrich
- Auxiliary Bishop Emeritus of Spiš
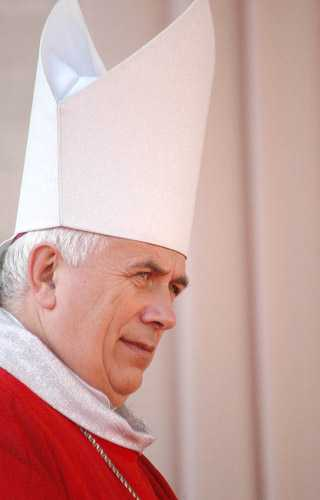
- Church: Roman Catholic Church
- Diocese: Diocese of Spiš
- Appointed: 4 June 1992
- Term ended: 15 October 2015
- Other post: Titular Bishop of Castellum Titulianum (1992–present)

Orders
- Ordination: 8 June 1974
- Consecration: 11 July 1992

Personal details
- Born: 9 January 1948 (age 78) Mníšek nad Popradom, Czechoslovakia
- Education: Comenius University
- Motto: Metanoia, oboedientia et spes
- Coat of arms

Andrej Imrich (born 9 January 1948) is a Slovak Roman Catholic prelate, who served as auxiliary bishop of the Diocese of Spiš from 1992 to 2015 and titular bishop of Castellum Titulianum. His resignation as auxiliary bishop was accepted by Pope Francis on 15 October 2015, after which he became auxiliary bishop emeritus.

== Early life and education ==
Imrich was born on 9 January 1948 in Mníšek nad Popradom in what was then Czechoslovakia. He attended secondary school in Stará Ľubovňa and later studied theology at the Roman Catholic Saints Cyril and Methodius Faculty of Theology of the Comenius University in Bratislava from 1969 to 1974.

He was ordained a priest for the Diocese of Spiš on 8 June 1974.

== Priestly ministry ==
After his ordination Imrich served as a chaplain in Rabča, Dolný Kubín and Spišská Nová Ves between 1974 and 1983. He later served as parish administrator in Zázrivá (1983–1985) and Trstená (1985–1990).

In 1989 he was appointed vicar general of the Diocese of Spiš, and in 1990 he became parish administrator in Spišské Podhradie.

== Episcopal ministry ==
On 4 June 1992 Pope John Paul II appointed Imrich auxiliary bishop of the Diocese of Spiš and titular bishop of Castellum Titulianum.

He received episcopal consecration on 11 July 1992 in St. Martin's Cathedral in Spišská Kapitula. The principal consecrator was Bishop František Tondra, with Archbishop Giovanni Coppa and Archbishop Ján Sokol serving as co-consecrators.

Imrich served as auxiliary bishop of the Diocese of Spiš for more than two decades. On 15 October 2015 Pope Francis accepted his resignation from the office.
