= Tony Randazzo =

Tony Randazzo may refer to:

- Tony Randazzo (bishop), auxiliary bishop of the Roman Catholic Archdiocese of Sydney
- Tony Randazzo (umpire) (born 1965), American baseball umpire
