= Imrich =

Imrich is a given name and a surname.

Notable people with the given name include:

- Imrich Andrejčák (1941–2018), Slovak army general and politician
- Imrich Bedecs (born 1991), Slovak footballer
- Imrich Bugár (1955–2026), Czechoslovak discus thrower
- Imrich Chlamtac (born 1949), Slovak computer scientist
- Imrich Karvaš (1903–1981), Slovak economist
- Imrich Lichtenfeld (1910–1998), Hungarian-born Israeli martial artist
- Imrich Lyócsa (born 1963), Slovak para archer and wheelchair curler
- Imrich Matyáš (1896–1974), Slovak archivist and LGBT activist
- Imrich Stacho (1931–2006), Slovak football goalkeeper

Notable people with the surname include:

- Andrej Imrich (born 1948), Slovak Roman Catholic bishop
- Wilfried Imrich (born 1941), Austrian mathematician
