= Alexis Babine =

Russian librarian and historian (1866–1930)

- Алексей Васильевич Бабин
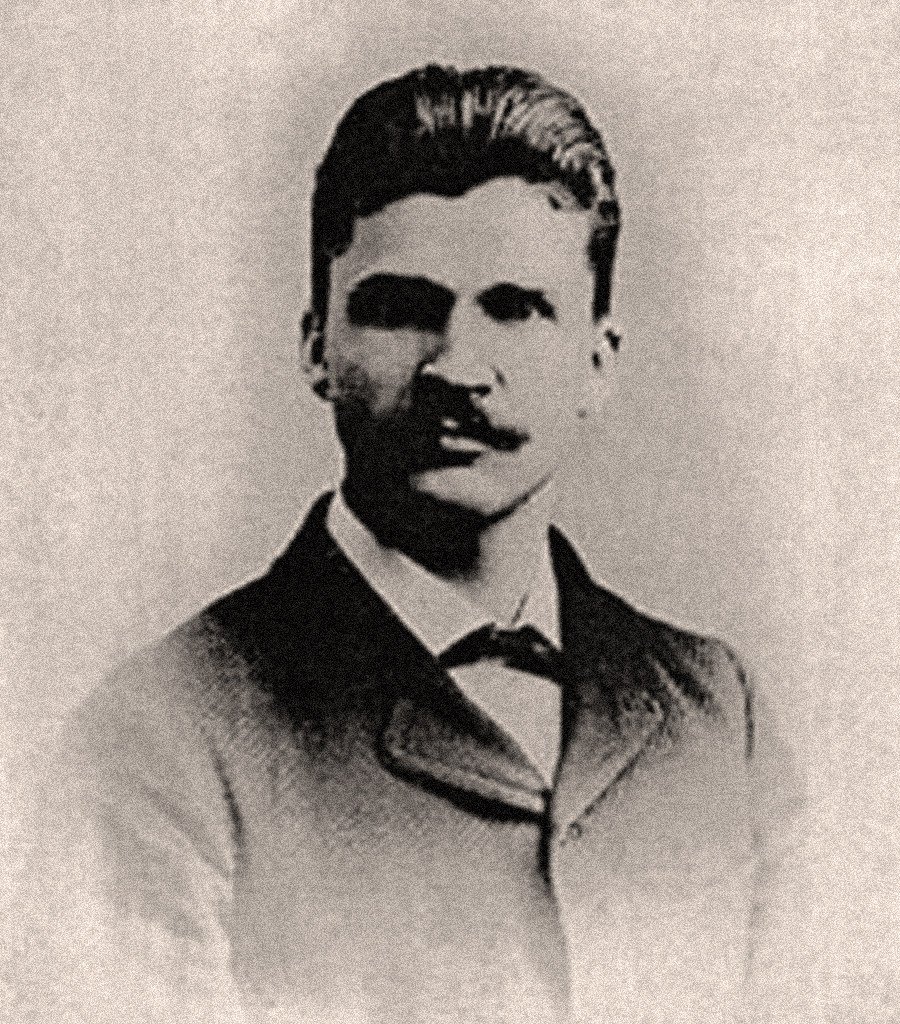
- Born: 22 March 1866; Elatma, Ryazan Province, Russian Empire
- Died: 10 May 1930 (aged 64); Rockville, Maryland, United States of America
- Education: Cornell University (BA, MA)
- Occupations: Librarian, Historian
- Years active: 1896-1930
- Known for: Acquisition of the Yudin Collection

Alexei Vasilievich Babin (Russian: Алексей Васильевич Бабин), better known as Alexis Babine, was a librarian and historian who was born in the Russian Empire. In Russia, he is most well known for authoring The History of the North American United States (Russian: История Северо-Американских Соединенных Штатов), the first major work written by a Russian author about the history of the United States. In the United States and abroad, Babine is more well known for managing the acquisition of the Yudin Collection, a set of eighty-thousand rare Russian and Slavic books, for the Library of Congress.

== Early life ==
=== Childhood and adolescence: 1866–1889 ===
Babine was born on 22 March 1866 in the third-estate provincial town (Russian: мещанин город) of Elatma, in the Ryazan region, about one hundred and fifty miles east of Moscow. His father, Vasilii Pavlovich Babin, was a builder and a fisherman.

Babine graduated from Elatma's gymnasium for men (Russian: Елатомская мужская гимназия) in 1885, then going on to study at the Saint Petersburg Institute of History and Philology (Russian: Императорский Санкт-Петербургский историко-филологический институт). During his time there, he worked as a school teacher and librarian at the Okhta Trade School. He did not complete his degree at the Institute.

After accidentally shooting his friend in the head, he quickly left Russia and took up work as a stoker on a ship in Riga. It was from there that he came to the United States, excited by the opportunity to raise his social circumstances through work and education. Babine arrived in New York in late 1889.

=== Cornell University: 1890–1896 ===
Babine started working in the library of Cornell University as a temporary cataloger of the Russian-themed Eugene Schuyler collection upon his arrival to the United States. Despite the fact that he only had a basic understanding of English at the time, he managed to work at the library successfully and soon enrolled as a student at the University. While he studied, he was able to gain formal training and experience in classification and cataloging. Babine graduated with a Bachelor's degree in 1892, and then with a Master's degree in 1894; both degrees were in American history.

Babine briefly went to Paris, and upon his return to the United States began working as a cataloger for Cornell University's French Revolution collection. He kept this position until 1896.

== Career ==
=== Indiana University and Stanford University: 1896–1901 ===
Babine worked for two years at the Indiana University Bloomington as a librarian. During his time there, he attempted to integrate Cornell's methods of cataloging into Indiana's library.

He was next appointed as an associate librarian at the newly formed Stanford University by then president of Stanford, David Starr Jordan (1851–1931), who knew Babine from his work at Cornell and Indiana. Babine was tasked with the difficult job of organizing and cataloging about 12,000 volumes during his first month on campus, with the help of students he recruited as volunteers. He was reportedly quite friendly with Stanford's administration, as well as the students.

In the 1899-1900 and 1900-1901 semesters, Babine taught beginner and advanced Russian at Stanford, a first for any American university at the time. In 1900, he managed the shifting of the entire collection of Stanford's library into a newer, bigger building. He was assisted by eighty-seven student volunteers.

Unfortunately, Babine was forced to resign in 1901 after the Gilbert affair, in which he corroborated the claim that a friend of David Starr Jordan's had improper relations with a young librarian. In a letter he wrote to Jordan following his resignation, he claimed that he had already considered resigning the previous year due to tensions with Jordan and the other staff.

Babine remained beloved by the students of Stanford, who made him "permanent president" of the newly established fencing club. He was written about fondly in the 1902 Stanford yearbook.

=== Library of Congress and the acquisition of the Yudin Collection: 1902–1910 ===
Arguably Babine's greatest achievement, the acquisition of the Yudin Collection, was conducted during his time at the Library of Congress. He was hired as a cataloger and a "specialist in charge of Slavic literature" in 1902. Around this time, the Librarian of Congress, Herbert Putnam (1861–1955), took Babine with him to visit libraries in central and eastern Europe, including libraries in Moscow and Saint Petersburg. Soon after, in the spring of 1904, Babine arranged for the acquisition of the one thousand and five hundred book collection of Martin Hattala, a prominent Czech intellectual, for the Library of Congress.

Putnam then tasked Babine with appraising the eighty thousand volume collection of a Siberian merchant, Genadii Yudin. Babine made several trips to Krasnoyarsk, a town in Siberia where the collection was located, and wrote a bilingual, bibliographic description of the legendary collection in 1905.

The Yudin Collection contained sixty-eight thousand volumes in Russian, twelve thousand in other Slavic languages, and over half a million manuscripts, mostly in Russian. Some of the materials dated back to the early eighteenth century, though most of the materials were from the latter half of the nineteenth century. The bibliography, literature, and history of Russia were the main focus of the collection. Of great interest to the Library of Congress were the books and manuscripts about the Russian discovery of Alaska and the continental United States.

After Babine's negotiations with Yudin, the collection was purchased in 1906 for forty thousand dollars. Babine was very personally involved with the acquisition, both translating the correspondence between the Library of Congress and Yudin and helping package over five hundred boxes of materials for overseas shipment.

After training at Sorbonne University for a brief time, Babine decided to emigrate back to Russia due to his parents being ill. Babine had begun to catalog the Yudin Collection, but was not able to complete his work before he left the Library of Congress.

== Return to Russia ==
When Babine returned to Russia in 1910, he established a second career as an inspector of schools, first in Kharkhiv and then in Vologda. It was during this time that he authored what he considered to be his main life's work, The History of the North American United States. This two-book series was popular in Russia due to it being the first major work about American history written by a Russian author.

In 1917, after the February Revolution, Babine was assigned to work at Saratov University (Russian: Саратовский государственный университет) in Saratov as an English teacher and librarian. While there, he attempted to introduce the Library of Congress classification system to Saratov University's library.

Babine briefly worked for the American Relief Administration (ARA) from 1921 to 1922 as a translator. Despite the constant risk of starvation, he survived the Civil War thanks to food rations and packages of supplies sent from friends at Cornell. He detailed his experiences in his diaries, in which he provided a fragmented depiction of ordinary middle class life during the Civil War. He was vehemently opposed to the Revolution, as his hatred of the Bolsheviks and leftist groups was cultivated during the years of war.

After fleeing to London with the help of his colleagues in the ARA, Babine emigrated back to the United States, specifically to Rockville, Maryland.

== Later life ==
Once Babine had returned to the United States in 1922, he took up work as the head of acquisitions at Cornell University's library. He was then offered a position at the Smithsonian Institution, but declined so that he could renew his connections with the Library of Congress.

In 1927, Babine returned to the Library of Congress as its assistant head of the Slavic section. From 1927 to his death in 1930, he oversaw the cataloging and reshelving of over ten thousand books, including materials from the Yudin Collection.

Babine died at Waverly Sanitarium in Rockville, Maryland, United States on 10 May 1930. He left the majority of his estate to the Library of Congress.

== Selected works ==
- Babine, A. V., & Raleigh, D. J. (1988). A Russian Civil War Diary: Alexis Babine in Saratov, 1917-1922. Duke University Press.
- Babine, A. V. (1905). The Yudin library, Krasnoiarsk (Eastern Siberia). Press of Judd and Detweiler.
- History of the North American United States: in 2 volumes / [Comp.] A. V. Babin. - St. Petersburg: Printing House of A. G. Trenke and V. Fusno, 1912. - V. 1: 1607-1829. - 493 p.
- History of the North American United States: in 2 volumes / [Comp.] A. V. Babin. - St. Petersburg: Printing House of A. G. Trenke and V. Fusno, 1912. - V. 2: 1829-1910. - 472 p.
