= Anthony Randazzo =

Australian Catholic bishop

The Most Reverend Anthony Randazzo
- Prefect of the Dicastery for Legislative Texts
- Church: Catholic
- Appointed: 25 March 2026
- Predecessor: Filippo Iannone
- Previous posts: Titular Bishop of Quiza (2016‍–‍2019); Auxiliary bishop of the Archdiocese of Sydney (2016‍–‍2019); Bishop of Broken Bay (2019‍–‍2026); Apostolic administrator of the Personal Ordinariate of Our Lady of the Southern Cross (2023‍–‍2026); President of the Federation of Catholic Bishops Conferences of Oceania (2023‍–‍2026)

Orders
- Ordination: 29 November 1991 by Francis Roberts Rush
- Consecration: 24 August 2016 by Anthony Fisher

Personal details
- Born: Anthony Randazzo; 7 October 1966 (age 60) Sydney, Australia
- Education: Pius XII Seminary, Banyo, Pontifical Gregorian University
- Motto: Fiat voluntas Tua (Latin for 'Thy will be done')

Styles of Anthony Randazzo
- Reference style: The Most Reverend
- Spoken style: Your Excellency
- Religious style: Archbishop

Anthony Randazzo (born 7 October 1966) is an Australian Catholic prelate who is the prefect of the Dicastery for Legislative Texts.

From 2019 to 2026, he was the bishop ordinary of the Diocese of Broken Bay in New South Wales. Between 2023 and 2026 he was also apostolic administrator of the Personal Ordinariate of Our Lady of the Southern Cross. He was an auxiliary bishop in the Archdiocese of Sydney from 2016 to 2019.

== Early life ==
Anthony Randazzo was born on 7 October 1966 in Sydney, the only son and the third of four children born to Sydney-born Colin Randazzo and his wife Caterina Di Losa from Lipari, Italy. His parents worked as fruiterers at their family business in Bankstown. In 1967 they moved to Coolangatta on the Gold Coast. Randazzo attended Saint Augustine's School in Coolangatta in 1972/73 and then two schools in Southport, Guardian Angels School from 1973 to 1975 and Aquinas College from 1976 to 1983. His first jobs were working in the hospitality industry and teaching music in a Catholic primary school.

== Priesthood ==
Randazzo entered Pius XII Seminary, Banyo, in 1985 and earned his Bachelor of Theology degree in 1991. He served as a deacon at All Saints Parish in Albany Creek. He was ordained a priest on 29 November 1991 at the Cathedral of St Stephen, Brisbane, by Archbishop Francis Roberts Rush. From 1992 to 1994, he was a curate at Saint Mary's Parish in Ipswich. From 1995 to 1997 he was the master of ceremonies at the cathedral in Brisbane. From 1998 to 2001, Randazzo studied canon law at the Pontifical Gregorian University, earning a licentiate in canon law in 2000 and a diploma in law in 2001. Returning to Brisbane, he was parish priest of Regina Caeli Parish in Coorparoo Heights from 2001 to 2003, associate judicial vicar of the regional tribunal from 2001 to 2005 and director of vocations for the Archdiocese of Brisbane from 2001 to 2004.

From 2004 to 2009, Randazzo worked at the Congregation for the Doctrine of the Faith in Rome. He was given the title Monsignor in 2007. He was Brisbane's director of vocations again from 2009 to 2010. From 2009 to 2015 he was the rector of Holy Spirit Seminary in Brisbane. He spent part of 2016 studying sacred scripture in Jerusalem.

== Episcopate ==
On 24 June 2016, Pope Francis named Randazzo as an auxiliary bishop of the Archdiocese of Sydney. He received his episcopal consecration from Archbishop Anthony Fisher and was installed at St Mary's Cathedral, Sydney, on 24 August 2016.

Pope Francis named him Bishop of Broken Bay on 7 October 2019. He was installed there on 4 November 2019.

In February 2023, Randazzo was elected to a four-year term as president of the Federation of Catholic Bishops Conferences of Oceania at the Episcopal Conference of the Pacific.

On 21 April 2023, he was named apostolic administrator of the Personal Ordinariate of Our Lady of the Southern Cross, effective 1 July 2023. He was replaced in that position on 13 May 2026.

On 25 March 2026, Pope Leo XIV named Randazzo as the prefect of the Dicastery for Legislative Texts and gave him the title of Archbishop. Randazzo remained in Australia for three months whilst serving as apostolic administrator of Broken Bay.

Catholic Church titles
Preceded by Linas Vodopjanovas	— TITULAR — Titular Bishop of Quiza; 2016–2019	Succeeded by Ján Kuboš
Preceded by Peter Comensoli	Bishop of Broken Bay; 2019–2026	Succeeded by TBA
Preceded by Carl Reid as Ordinary	Apostolic Administrator of the Personal Ordinariate of Our Lady of the Southern Cross; 2023–2026	Succeeded by Steven Lopes
Preceded by Filippo Iannone	Prefect of the Dicastery for Legislative Texts; 2026–present	Incumbent
