= Štefan Sečka =

Slovak bishop (1953–2020)

- Bishop of Spiš
- Church: Catholic Church
- Diocese: Diocese of Spiš
- In office: 4 August 2011 – 8 October 2020
- Predecessor: František Tondra
- Successor: František Trstenský
- Previous posts: Titular Bishop of Sita (2002-2011); Auxiliary Bishop of Spiš (2002-2011)

Orders
- Ordination: 6 June 1976
- Consecration: 27 July 2002 by František Tondra

Personal details
- Born: 6 July 1953 Spišský Štvrtok, Prešov Region, Czechoslovakia
- Died: 8 October 2020 (aged 67) Levoča, Prešov Region, Slovakia

Štefan Sečka (6 July 1953 – 28 October 2020) was a Slovak Roman Catholic bishop.

Sečka was born in Czechoslovakia and was ordained to the priesthood in 1976. He served as Titular bishop of Sita and Auxiliary Bishop of the Roman Catholic Diocese of Spiš, Slovakia, from 2002 to 2011 and was bishop of the diocese from 2011 until his death in 2020.

Sečka died on 28 October 2020 from cardiac arrest at the age of 67.
