= Spišský Štvrtok =

- Municipality
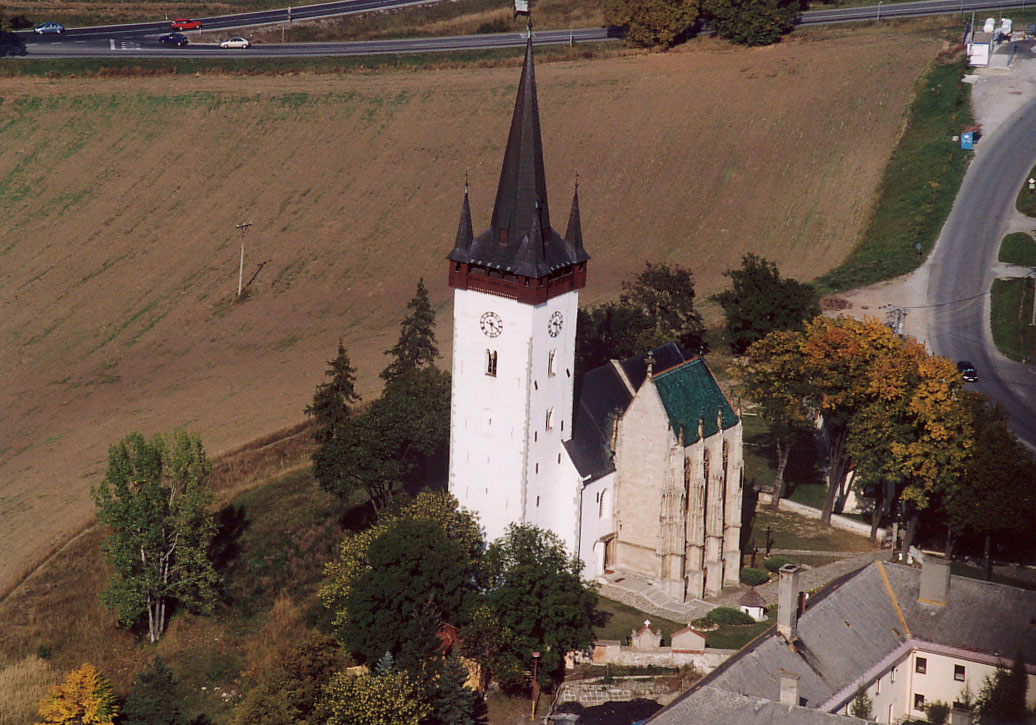
- Church of St. Ladislaus in the village

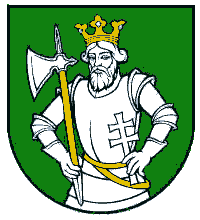
- Flag Coat of arms

- Location of Spišský Štvrtok in the Prešov Region Location of Spišský Štvrtok in Slovakia
- Coordinates: 49.00°N 20.47°E
- Country: Slovakia
- Region: Prešov Region
- District: Levoča
- First mentioned: 1263

Area
  - Total: 14.23 km^{2} (5.49 sq mi)
- Elevation: 546 m (1,791 ft)

Population (2025)
  - Total: 2,600
- Time zone: UTC+1 (CET)
  - Summer (DST): UTC+2 (CEST)
- Postal code: 531 4
- Area code: +421 53
- Vehicle registration plate (until 2022): LE
- Website: www.spisskystvrtok.sk

Spišský Štvrtok (before 1927 "Štvrtok"; German: Donnersmark, Hungarian: Csütörtökhely, Polish: Spiski Czwartek) is a village and municipality in Levoča District in the Prešov Region of central-eastern Slovakia. In historical records the village was first mentioned in 1263. The municipality lies at an elevation of 560 metres and covers an area of 14.237 km^{2}. It has a population of about 2,334 people.

The name of the village means "Thursday market", referring to its historical market-day. Name before 1242 was Szentlászló after Ladislaus I of Hungary

== Geography ==
The municipality lies at an altitude of 546 metres (1,791 ft) and covers an area of 14.23 km^{2} (5.49 sq mi) (2025).

== Population ==
Population statistic (10 years)
Year	1995	2005	2015	2025
Count	2215	2341	2460	2600
Difference		+5.68%	+5.08%	+5.69%

Population statistic
Year	2024	2025
Count	2612	2600
Difference		−0.45%

It has a population of 2600 people (31 December 2025).

=== Ethnicity ===
Census 2021 (1+ %)
Ethnicity	Number	Fraction
Slovak	2403	93.21%
Romani	179	6.94%
Not found out	128	4.96%
Total	2578	

In year 2021 was 2578 people by ethnicity 2403 as Slovak, 179 as Romani, 128 as Not found out, 8 as Rusyn, 7 as Czech, 5 as Other, 1 as Ukrainian, 1 as Russian, 1 as German, 1 as Moravian, 1 as Hungarian and 1 as French.

Note on population: The difference values of population numbers in the table "Population statistic" and in the sections "Ethnicity" & "Religion" is caused by the use of various statistical methods.

=== Religion ===
Census 2021 (1+ %)
Religion	Number	Fraction
Roman Catholic Church	2146	83.24%
None	223	8.65%
Not found out	117	4.54%
Greek Catholic Church	33	1.28%
Total	2578	

In year 2021 was 2578 people by religion 2146 from Roman Catholic Church, 223 from None, 117 from Not found out, 33 from Greek Catholic Church, 20 from Christian Congregations in Slovakia, 11 from Evangelical Church, 11 from Ad hoc movements, 3 from Old Catholic Church, 3 from Eastern Orthodox Church, 3 from Paganism and natural spirituality, 3 from Other, 2 from Jehovah's Witnesses, 2 from Apostolic Church and 1 from Other and not ascertained christian church.

== People ==
- Henckel von Donnersmarck
- Szapolya family
- Mikuláš Dzurinda, former prime minister of Slovakia.
- Štefan Sečka, a former Roman Catholic auxiliary bishop of the Roman Catholic Diocese of Spiš
