= Quiza Xenitana =

- Quiza Cenitana
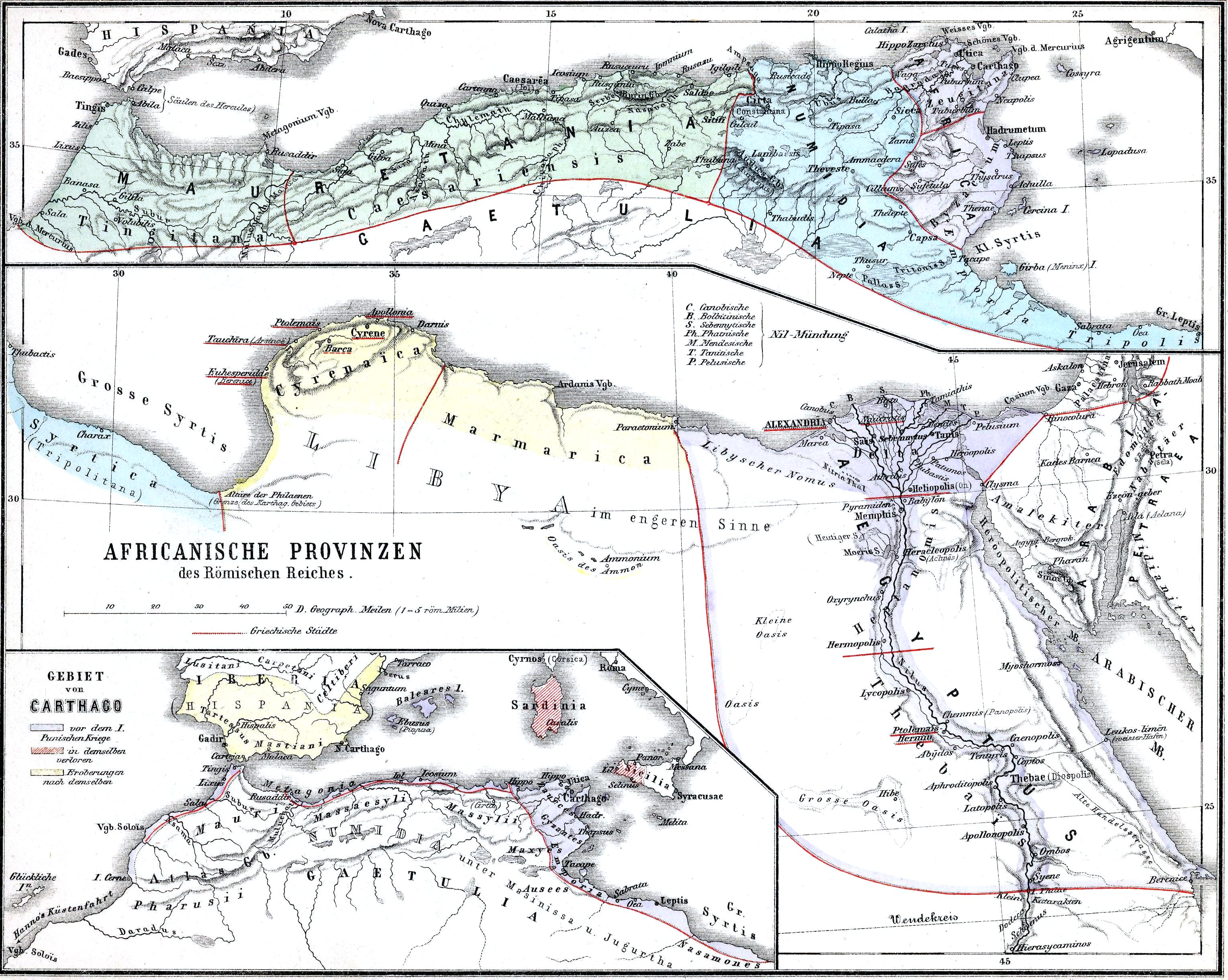
- Map showing "Quiza", just west of Cartennas, on the coast of Mauretania Caesariensis

- Location within Algeria
- 36.025896°N 0.26658°E
- Location: Algeria
- Region: Mostaganem Province

Quiza (Ancient Greek: Κούϊζα) also known as Vuiza (Βούϊζα), which Pliny the Elder called Quiza Xenitana, (Note: This is sometimes mistakenly written Quiza Cenitana) was a Roman–Berber colonia, located in the former province of Mauretania Caesariensis. The town is identified with ruins at Sidi Bellater, Algiers.

== History ==
Quiza was originally a small Berber village, with Phoenician roots. It grew under the Roman empire. Around 120 AD, the emperor Hadrian erected an arch in the city.

William Smith identified Quiza with Giza near Oran, Algeria in his work, Dictionary of Greek and Roman Geography. More recent investigations have identified it with present-day El-Benian on the coast road between Mostaga and Dara.

In his Natural History, 4.2.3., Pliny the Elder: writes: "Next to this is Quiza Xenitana, a town founded by strangers"; a remark explained because the word Xenitana is derived from Greek ξένος, "a stranger", as explained also by Victor Vitensis. The town is mentioned also by Pliny elsewhere (5.2), by Ptolemy, and by Pomponius Mela.

== Bishopric ==
Quiza is also a titular see of Christianity. Quaestoriana was in the ecclesiastical province of Byzacena.

At the Council of Carthage (411), which brought together Catholic and Donatist bishops, Quiza was represented by the Catholic Priscus, who had no Donatist counterpart. He is mentioned also in a letter of Saint Augustine to Pope Celestine I. Tiberianus of Quiza was one of the Catholic bishops whom the Arian Vandal king Huneric summoned to Carthage in 484 and then exiled. In addition, the name of a Bishop Vitalianus appears in the mosaic pavement of the excavated basilica of Quiza.

Bishops

No longer a residential bishopric, Quiza is today listed by the Catholic Church as a titular see.

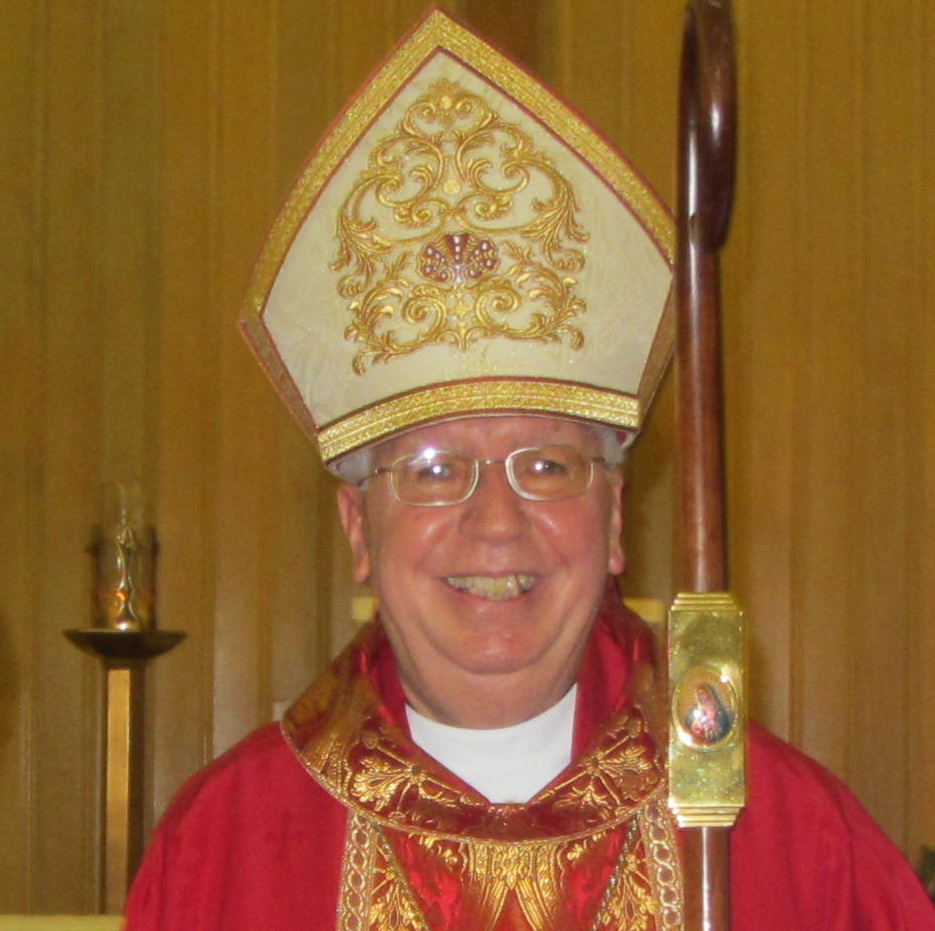
Bishop Flores of San Diego.

- Priscus fl 411.
- Tiberianus of Quiza fl 484
- Vitalianus
- Adrien André Maria Cimichella, O.S.M. † (5 Jun 1964 Appointed – 21 Jul 2004 Died)
- José Guadalupe Torres Campos (10 Dec 2005 Appointed – 25 Nov 2008 Appointed, Bishop of Gómez Palacio, Durango)
- Cirilo B. Flores † (5 Jan 2009 Appointed – 4 Jan 2012 Appointed, Coadjutor Bishop of San Diego, California)
- Linas Vodopjanovas, O.F.M. (11 Feb 2012 Appointed – 20 May 2016 Appointed, Bishop of Panevėžys)
- Anthony Randazzo (24 Jun 2016 Appointed - 7 Oct 2019 Appointed, Bishop of Broken Bay)
- Ján Kuboš (25 Mar 2020 Appointed)

== See also ==
- Mauretania Caesariensis

== Bibliography ==
- Laffi, Umberto. Colonie e municipi nello Stato romano Ed. di Storia e Letteratura. Roma, 2007 ISBN 8884983509
- Mommsen, Theodore. The Provinces of the Roman Empire Section: Roman Africa. (Leipzig 1865; London 1866; London: Macmillan 1909; reprint New York 1996) Barnes & Noble. New York, 1996
