= František Trstenský =

Slovak bishop

His Excellency František Trstenský
- Diocesan bishop of Spiš
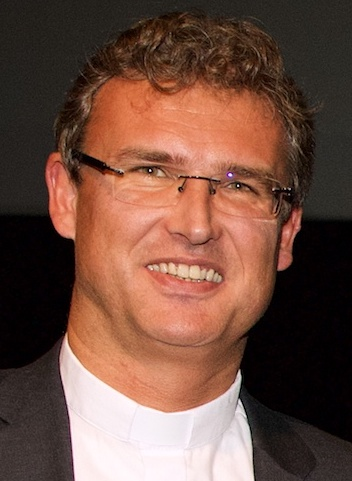
- Church: Roman Catholic Church
- Diocese: Roman Catholic Diocese of Spiš
- Installed: 21 October 2023
- Previous posts: Dean of Kežmarok; Prorector of the Catholic University in Ružomberok; Member of the Presidency of FUCE (European Federation of Catholic Universities)

Orders
- Ordination: 21 June 1997
- Consecration: 21 October 2023 by Bernard Bober
- Rank: Bishop

Personal details
- Born: 13 March 1973 (age 53) Trstená
- Denomination: Roman Catholic
- Motto: ABBA PATER
- Coat of arms

František Trstenský (born 13 March 1973 in Trstená) is the current bishop of the Roman Catholic Diocese of Spiš, Slovakia.
