= Ján Kuboš =

Slovak Roman Catholic bishop

His Excellency Mons. Ján Kuboš
- Auxiliary Bishop of the Diocese of Spiš; Titular Bishop of Quiza
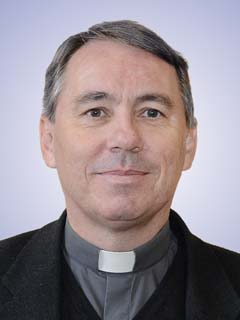
- Ján Kuboš in 2018
- Church: Roman Catholic Church
- Diocese: Diocese of Spiš
- Appointed: 25 March 2020
- Installed: 24 June 2020
- Predecessor: Štefan Sečka

Orders
- Ordination: 18 June 1989 by Ján Sokol
- Consecration: 24 June 2020 by Štefan Sečka
- Rank: Auxiliary Bishop

Personal details
- Born: 28 February 1966 (age 60) Trstená, Czechoslovakia
- Motto: Bonitas - Iustitia - Veritas (Latin for 'Goodness - Justice - Truth')
- Coat of arms: Ján Kuboš's coat of arms

Ján Kuboš (born 28 February 1966) is a Slovak Roman Catholic prelate. He is the auxiliary bishop in the Diocese of Spiš and the titular bishop of Quiza.

== Biography ==
Ján Kuboš was born on 28 February 1966 in the village of Trstená in Northern Slovakia. He was ordained priest on 18 June 1898. Afterwards, he served as chaplain in Podolínec, Svit, Liptovský Mikuláš and Ružomberok before becoming a parish priest in Liptovská Osada. He served for a while as a prison chaplain. From 1997 to 2017 he was in charge of spiritual direction at the Spišská Kapitula. In 2017 he became the parish priest in Kežmarok.

Kuboš was named an auxiliary bishop of Spiš and the titular bishop of Quiza on 25 March 2020 by Pope Francis. He was consecrated by the bishop of Spiš Štefan Sečka on 24 June 2020 in Spišské Podhradie.
