= Mníšek nad Popradom =

Village and municipality in Slovakia

- Municipality
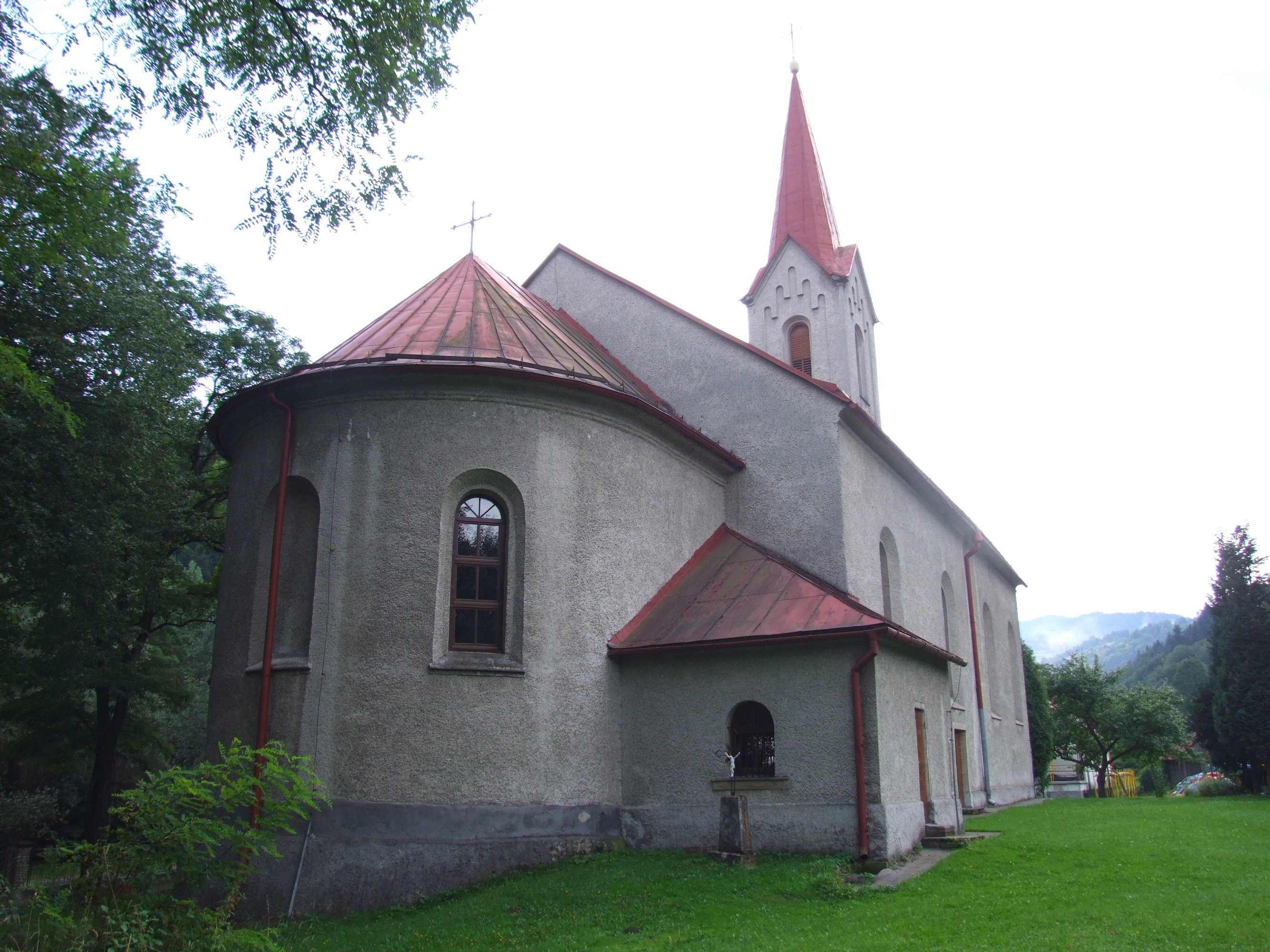

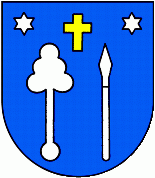
- Flag Coat of arms

- Location of Mníšek nad Popradom in the Prešov Region Location of Mníšek nad Popradom in Slovakia
- Coordinates: 49.42°N 20.72°E
- Country: Slovakia
- Region: Prešov Region
- District: Stará Ľubovňa District
- First mentioned: 1323

Area
  - Total: 17.93 km^{2} (6.92 sq mi)
- Elevation: 439 m (1,440 ft)

Population (2025)
  - Total: 589
- Time zone: UTC+1 (CET)
  - Summer (DST): UTC+2 (CEST)
- Postal code: 652 2
- Area code: +421 52
- Vehicle registration plate (until 2022): SL
- Website: www.mniseknadpopradom.sk

Mníšek nad Popradom (Hungarian: Poprádremete; Rusyn: Мнішек над Попрадом; Polish: Mniszek or Mniszek nad Popradem; Ukrainian: Мнишок, romanized: Mnyshok) is a village and municipality in Stará Ľubovňa District in the Prešov Region of northern Slovakia.

== History ==
In historical records the village was first mentioned in 1323. Before the establishment of independent Czechoslovakia in 1918, Mníšek nad Popradom was part of Szepes County within the Kingdom of Hungary. From 1939 to 1945, it was part of the Slovak Republic. On 24 January 1945, the Red Army dislodged the Wehrmacht from Mníšek nad Popradom and it was once again part of Czechoslovakia.

== Geography ==
The municipality lies at an altitude of 439 metres (1,440 ft) and covers an area of 17.93 km^{2} (6.92 sq mi) (2025). The village lies near the Poprad river and is directly at the border with Poland, with a 24-hour border crossing.

== Population ==
Population statistic (10 years)
Year	1995	2005	2015	2025
Count	673	692	651	589
Difference		+2.82%	−5.92%	−9.52%

Population statistic
Year	2024	2025
Count	592	589
Difference		−0.50%

It has a population of 589 people (31 December 2025).

=== Ethnicity ===
Census 2021 (1+ %)
Ethnicity	Number	Fraction
Slovak	577	94.43%
Not found out	66	10.8%
Romani	22	3.6%
Polish	21	3.43%
Rusyn	12	1.96%
Total	611	

In year 2021 was 611 people by ethnicity 577 as Slovak, 66 as Not found out, 22 as Romani, 21 as Polish, 12 as Rusyn, 4 as Czech, 2 as German, 1 as Jewish, 1 as Russian and 1 as Other.

Note on population: The difference values of population numbers in the table "Population statistic" and in the sections "Ethnicity" & "Religion" is caused by the use of various statistical methods.

=== Religion ===
Census 2021 (1+ %)
Religion	Number	Fraction
Roman Catholic Church	542	88.71%
Greek Catholic Church	38	6.22%
None	15	2.45%
Not found out	12	1.96%
Total	611	

In year 2021 was 611 people by religion 542 from Roman Catholic Church, 38 from Greek Catholic Church, 15 from None, 12 from Not found out, 2 from Eastern Orthodox Church, 1 from Christian Congregations in Slovakia and 1 from Evangelical Church.
