= Master of Kirchdrauf =

German painter

The Kirchdrauf Master was an anonymous painter active between 1480 and 1490. His provisional name derives from an altarpiece he painted for the Cathedral of Saint Martin in Spišská Kapitula, in the town of Kirchdrauf. He worked in the late Gothic style.
