= František Tondra =

Slovak Roman Catholic bishop

- Bishop of Spiš
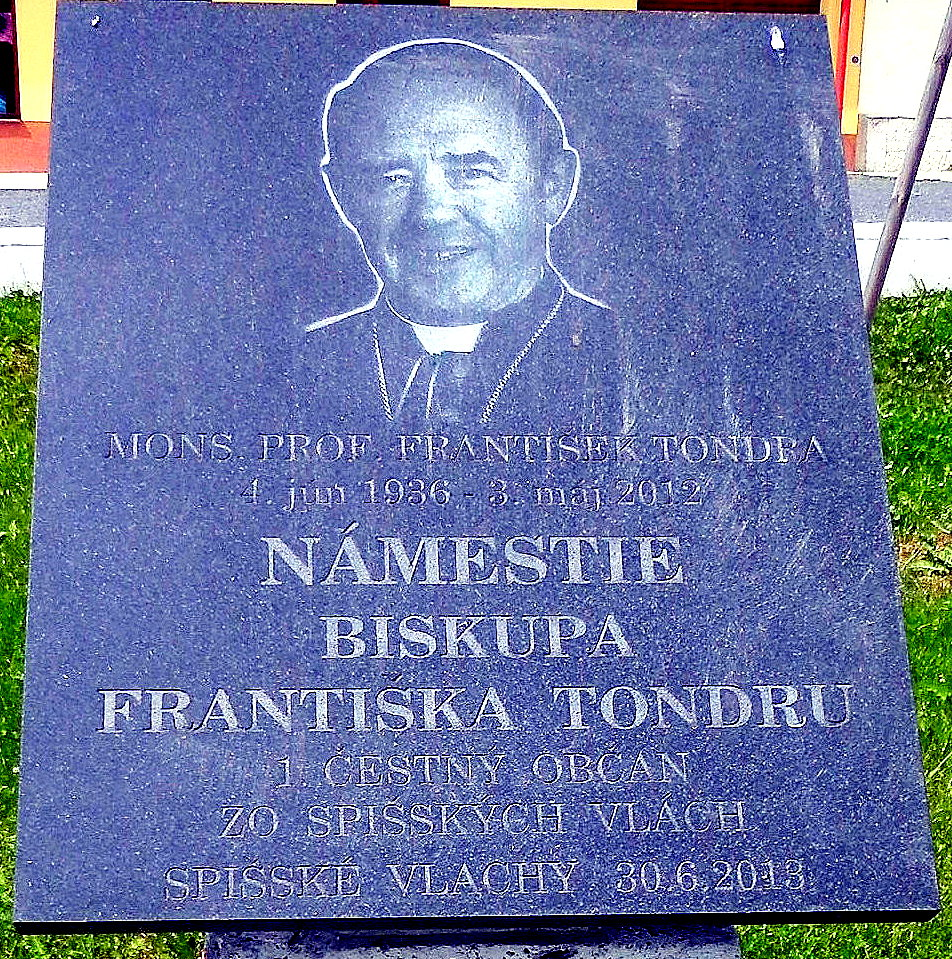
- Memorial plaque to Tondra in Spišské Vlachy at the town square bearing his name
- Church: Catholic Church
- Diocese: Diocese of Spiš
- In office: 26 July 1989 – 4 August 2011
- Predecessor: Ján Vojtaššák
- Successor: Štefan Sečka

Orders
- Ordination: 1 July 1962
- Consecration: 9 September 1989 by Jozef Tomko

Personal details
- Born: 4 June 1936 Spišské Vlachy, Slovak Kraj, Czechoslovak Republic
- Died: 3 May 2012 (aged 75) Košice, Košice Region, Slovakia

František Tondra (4 June 1936 in Spišské Vlachy - 3 May 2012 in Košice) was the Roman Catholic bishop of the Roman Catholic Diocese of Spiš (1989-2011), Slovakia.

Ordained to the priesthood in 1962, he became bishop in 1989 and retired in 2011.
