= Martin Hattala =

Slovak priest and linguist (1821–1903)

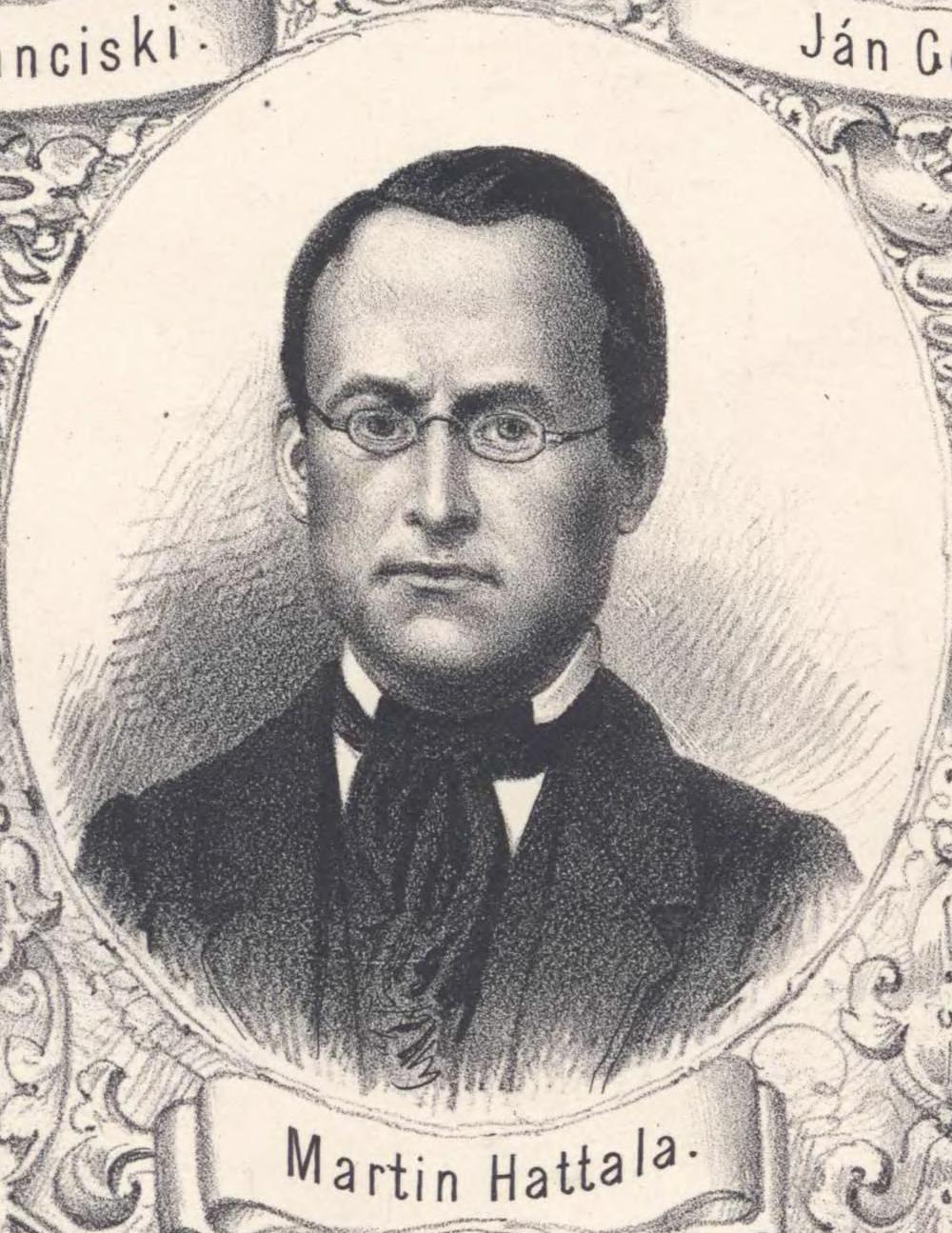
- Hattala in 1863
- Born: 4 November 1821; Trstená, Kingdom of Hungary
- Died: 11 December 1903 (aged 82); Prague, Austria-Hungary
- Occupations: Catholic priest; Linguist; Theologian; Teacher
- Known for: Hodža–Hattala reform of Slovak

Martin Hattala (4 November 1821 – 11 December 1903) was a Slovak pedagogue, Catholic priest, theologian, and linguist. He is best known for his reform of Štúr's Slovak language, called the Hodža–Hattala reform, in which he introduced the etymological principle to the Slovak language.

Hattala was born in Trstená. He studied theology in Vienna and was ordained a Catholic priest in Esztergom in December 1848. He was a faculty member of the University of Prague, where he taught from 1854. He was also a member of the academies of Bohemia and Russian Empire. He died in Prague in 1903.

His collection of work was purchased and is now part of the Library of Congress’s Slavic collection.

== Linguistic publications ==
- Grammatica linguae slovenicae collatae cum proxime cognata bohemica (Grammar of the Slovak language compared with the most closely related Czech language) (1850)
- Krátka mluvnica slovenská (A Concise Slovak Grammar) (1852)
- Zvukosloví jazyka staro- i novo českého a slovenského (Phonetics of the old and new Czech and Slovak language) (1854)
- O poměru Cyrillčiny k nynějším nářečím (On the relationship of Cyrillic to the contemporary dialects) (1855)
- Skladba jazyka českého (Syntax of the Czech language) (Prague 1855)
- Srovnávací mluvnice jazyka českého a slovenského (Comparative grammar of the Czech and Slovak language) (1857)
- O ablativě ve slovančině a litvančině (On the ablative in Slavic and Lithuanian) (1857–1858)
- Mnich Chrabr, příspěvek k objasnění původu písma slovanského (Monk Chrabr, contribution to clarify the origin of the Slavic script) (1858)
- Mluvnica jazyka slovenského I., II. (Grammar of Slovak) (1864, 1865)
- Počátečné skupeniny souhlásek československých (Initial consonant clusters in Czechoslovak) (1870)
- Brus jazyka českého. Příspěvek k dějinám osvěty vůbec a slovanské i české zvláště (Antibarbarus of the Czech language. Contribution to the history of the people's education in general and Slovak and Czech in particular) (Prague 1877)
