= Trstená =

- Municipality
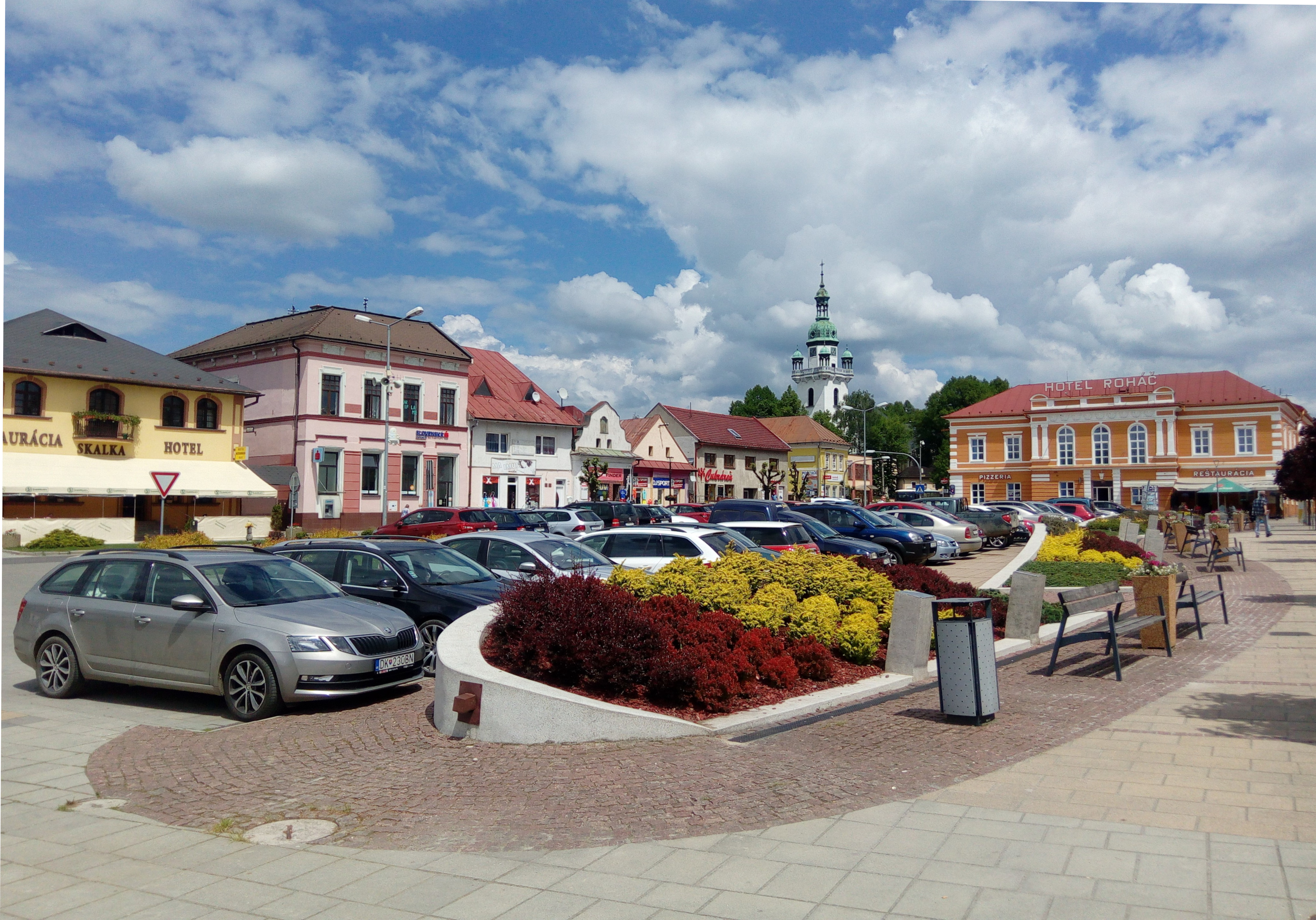
- M. R. Štefánik square, the main square of Trstená

- Flag Coat of arms

- Location of Trstená in the Žilina Region Location of Trstená in Slovakia
- Coordinates: 49.36°N 19.61°E
- Country: Slovakia
- Region: Žilina Region
- District: Tvrdošín District
- First mentioned: 1371

Government
  - Mayor: Magdaléna Zmarzláková

Area
  - Total: 82.53 km^{2} (31.87 sq mi)
- Elevation: 617 m (2,024 ft)

Population (2025)
  - Total: 6,900
- Time zone: UTC+1 (CET)
  - Summer (DST): UTC+2 (CEST)
- Postal code: 280 1
- Area code: +421 43
- Vehicle registration plate (until 2022): TS
- Website: www.trstena.sk

Trstená (Hungarian: Trsztena or Árvanádasd; Polish: Trzciana; German: Bingenstadt) is a town in Tvrdošín District, Žilina Region, Northern Slovakia.

== Geography ==
The municipality lies at an altitude of 617 metres (2,024 ft) and covers an area of 82.53 km^{2} (31.87 sq mi) (2025).

Trstená is situated on the Orava River at the Orava (reservoir) in the Slovak part of the Orava valley, approximately 6 kilometres (4 miles) south of the Polish border. Its elevation is 607 m (1,991 ft). Trstená is surrounded by fields, hills, dense forests and the Tatra Mountains to the East. Nearby are thermal pools. The nearest international airport is Kraków in Poland. The city has rail and road transport.

== History ==
In 1371, King Louis I of Hungary granted Duke Vladislaus II of Opole, Schwankomir (Vladislaus' notary and brother in law), Jan Hertel, a relative of Schwankomir from Einseidel in Silesia (and his sons, Jakub and Martin) and Vladislaus' brothers (Janko, Grimok, Junislav and Wismer) to establish a new town in the forest (from Zabiedov brook (Zadowa) to the Bukovina valley), near Tvrdošín. This new town was Trstená, a market town. The town's name comes from the word reed (Slovak: trstina).

=== Jan Hertel ===
Jan Hertel and his descendants became the hereditary mayors ('advocati' or 'sculteti') of Trstená (initially Bingenstad). Hertel was allowed, even though he was not a nobleman, to establish a public bar, a slaughter house, a blacksmith's forgery, bakery, shops and toll houses. (Other bakers, publicans, shoemakers and craftsmen were excluded from the town.) He was given the right to build mills anywhere near the Oravica brook, to mine and sell rock and to hunt and fish throughout the locale. Hertel was also made the local magistrate and tax collector. Trstená developed trade with Poland, with goods such as salt, cloth and lead, and also developed a strong potters' guild. Hertel's preferential treatment ensured his control of Trstená.

=== Taxes ===
Twenty years after the allocation of land for Trstená, taxes to the rulers of the Hungarian Empire at Orava Castle fell due. On each 11th day of November (St. Martin's day), citizens of Trstená paid one gold coin for each acre of land they owned. Sixteen denarii (silver coins) per acre were due at Easter, Christmas (Nativitatis Domini) and on the 24th day of June (St. John the Baptist's Day). Every sixth florin was given to the mayor himself.

=== Onus of war ===
During the reign of Sigismund of Luxemburg, Trstená was ravaged by Jodocus and Procopius of Luxemburg, Sigismund's cousins. In 1397, a royal decree was made that land holders were to perform military service. (The old and ill were excluded, but they had to send a substitute). Rich noblemen were to send one archer for every twenty serfs they owned. Even the church had to give half its revenue toward Sigismund's the war against the Ottoman Turks.

=== Waining of the hereditary mayors ===
Over time, Trstená and its mayors lost their granted autonomy. By 1424, Trstená was recorded as a domain of the Orava castle. Even so, some conditions of the original grant were respected. For example, in 1480, at the Turiec convent of Premonstratensians in Kláštor pod Znievom, the Trstená mayor, Adalbert Fojt, was favoured. A family called "Trstenský" (perhaps the continuation of the Hertel family renamed for the town), continued in the role of mayor at least until 1609. In that same year, Matthew II granted Trstená township the right to conduct four trade fairs per year.

=== Lutheran church ===
A parish of Trstená dates to 1397. An evangelical church developed between 1520 and 1551 (when the presence of an evangelical choir is recorded). In 1556, the Thurzó family ruled from Orava castle and were Lutheran. Although departure from the Catholic church was less evident in Hungary than in Germany, the Hertel family were German and this may have influenced religion in Trstená.

=== 1918 ===
Trstená was located in the Kingdom of Hungary of the Austro-Hungarian Dual Monarchy until the "Martin Declaration" of 1918.

=== WWII ===
Trstená was home to a Jewish community until World War II. The Trstená synagogue and Jewish cemetery remain as evidence of their past presence. The latest cemetery headstones are dated in the 1930s. Trstená was occupied by German forces and after heavy shelling, was liberated by Russian forces. A memorial in the main square celebrates the liberation of the town.

==== Trstená synagogue ====
The synagogue, located behind the town's main hotel, the Roháč, is now a shoe shop. Its exterior is well maintained in pale blue and white. The entrance portal has Renaissance-Baroque features.

==== Trstená Jewish cemetery ====
The wasteland unmarked Jewish cemetery is located on a steep wooded hillside above the main road to Tvrdošín, just outside Trstená township. There is public access through a broken masonry wall with no gate remaining. Within the cemetery is a pre-burial house. Headstones and tombstones of marble and sandstone are present in the dozens, some in Hebrew and some in Roman script.

== Population ==
Population statistic (10 years)
Year	1995	2005	2015	2025
Count	7100	7551	7408	6900
Difference		+6.35%	−1.89%	−6.85%

Population statistic
Year	2024	2025
Count	6953	6900
Difference		−0.76%

It has a population of 6900 people (31 December 2025).

=== Ethnicity ===
Census 2021 (1+ %)
Ethnicity	Number	Fraction
Slovak	6965	96.56%
Not found out	221	3.06%
Total	7213	

In year 2021 was 7213 people by ethnicity 6965 as Slovak, 221 as Not found out, 50 as Polish, 42 as Other, 41 as Czech, 6 as Rusyn, 6 as Russian, 5 as Hungarian, 4 as Serbian, 3 as German, 3 as Moravian, 3 as Bulgarian, 3 as English, 2 as Ukrainian, 2 as Italian, 2 as Austrian, 2 as Greek, 1 as Jewish, 1 as Chinese, 1 as Vietnamese, 1 as Silesian, 1 as Canadian and 1 as Croatian.

Note on population: The difference values of population numbers in the table "Population statistic" and in the sections "Ethnicity" & "Religion" is caused by the use of various statistical methods.

=== Religion ===
Census 2021 (1+ %)
Religion	Number	Fraction
Roman Catholic Church	6075	84.22%
None	763	10.58%
Not found out	198	2.75%
Total	7213	

In year 2021 was 7213 people by religion 6075 from Roman Catholic Church, 763 from None, 198 from Not found out, 53 from Evangelical Church, 25 from Greek Catholic Church, 25 from Ad hoc movements, 16 from Christian Congregations in Slovakia, 12 from Other, 9 from Jehovah's Witnesses, 8 from Other and not ascertained christian church, 6 from Islam, 5 from Eastern Orthodox Church, 4 from Buddhism, 3 from Paganism and natural spirituality, 3 from Church of Jesus Christ of Latter-day Saints, 2 from Apostolic Church, 1 from Jewish community, 1 from Old Catholic Church, 1 from Calvinist Church, 1 from United Methodist Church, 1 from Seventh-day Adventist Church and 1 from Baptists Church.

== Economy ==
Matsushita Corporation manufactures parts for Panasonic products in Trstená. The OVP-Orava company also manufactures televisions in Trstená. The Brezovica Ski Centre in Orava Village in the West Tatras is 7 km (4 mi) from Trstená. Trade between Poland and Slovakia across the border near Trstená has increased since Slovakia and Poland joined the European Union in 2004.

== Landmarks ==
=== St Martin's Church ===
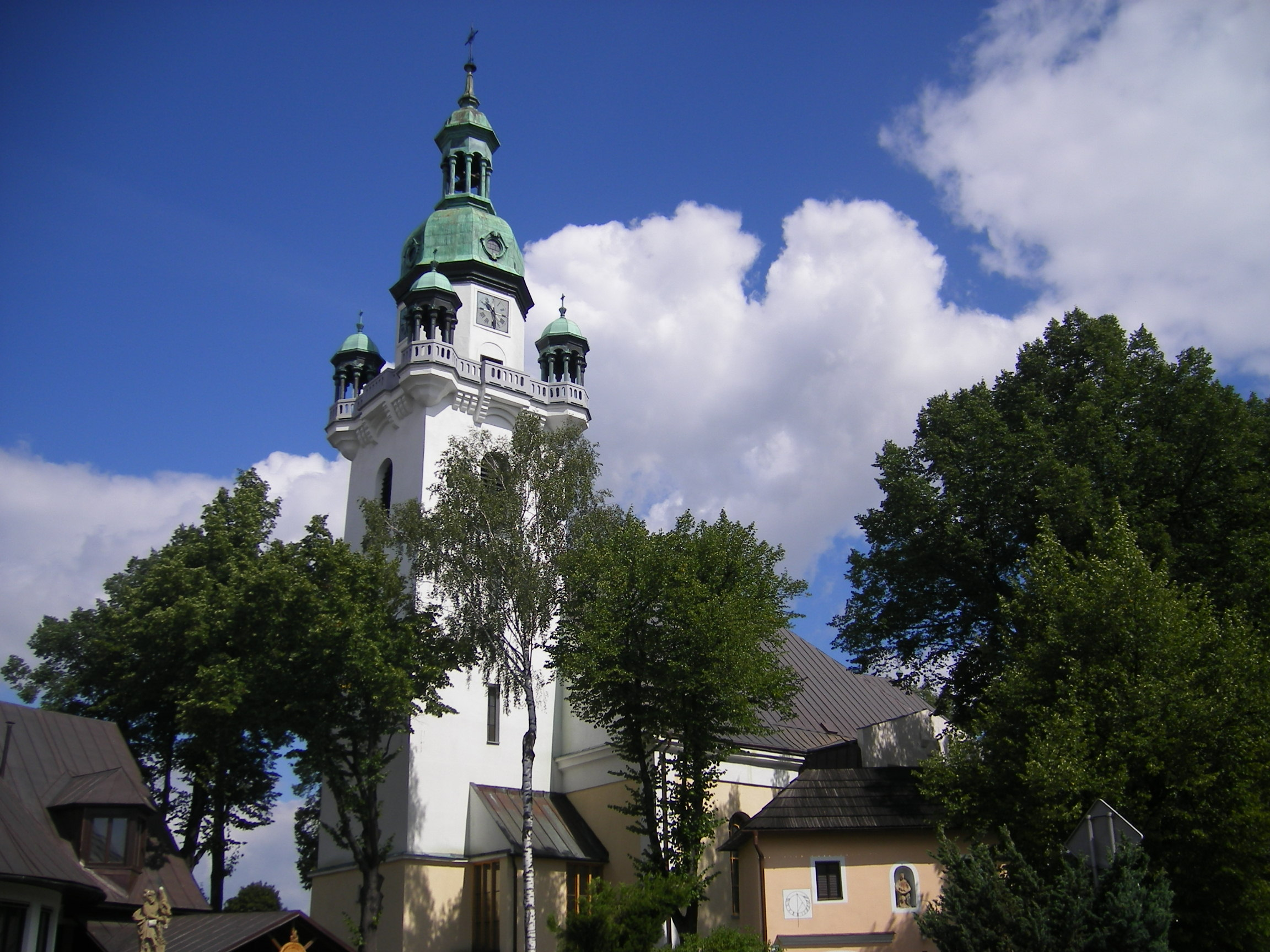
St Martin's church, Trstená

The first written reference to St Martin's church occurred in 1397. The church was rebuilt on its Gothic foundations during the evangelist movement of the 17th to 18th century. The church contains at least two crypts and other burials. Coffins, clothing and textiles found in the crypts represent a cultural record of regional rustic funereal art of the 1700s and 1800s. St Martin's church has a more recent turreted spire, modelled on a Czech design, after the original was dislodged towards the end of World War II by an off course Russian Katuysha rocket. St Martin's church houses a revered religious painting that attracts pilgrims. In floor heating was laid in the church in 1996. The church is surrounded by a wall around which are placed more than six large seats, outdoor confessionals to accommodate the needs of pilgrims.

=== St Florian's statue ===
A stone pillar with St Florian's statue was erected in Trstena in 1705.

=== Festivals ===
- Škapuliar´s fair (July)
- St Martin´s Fair (November)

== Notable people ==
- Rudolf Dilong, priest and poet
- Hugolín Gavlovič, priest and author
- Martin Hattala (1821–1903), linguist
- Ján Kuboš (born 1966), bishop
- Erik Jendrišek(born 1986), footballer
- Štefan J. Pánik, priest and namesake of Father Panik Village in Bridgeport, CT
- Marcel Schein, physicist
- Milo Urban, author

== Twin towns – sister cities ==
Trstená is twinned with:

- Hořice, Czech Republic
- Isaszeg, Hungary
- Jabłonka, Poland
- Ozorków, Poland
- Želiezovce, Slovakia
- Žirovnice, Czech Republic
