= Spišská Kapitula =

- Ecclesiastical Town
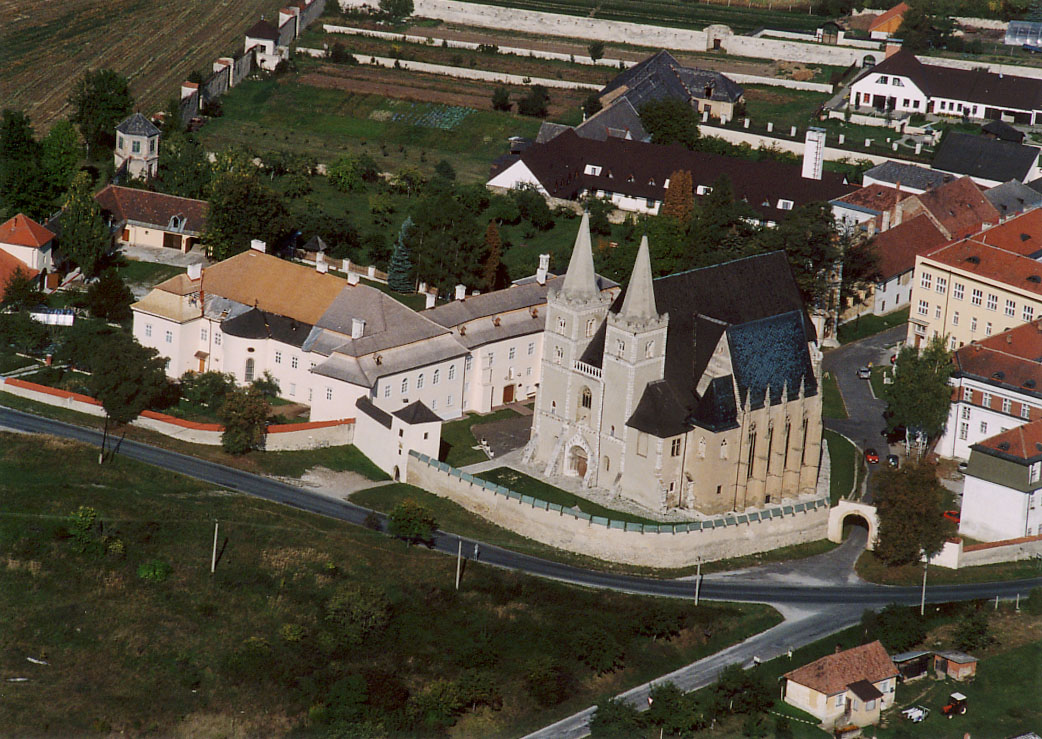
- View of Spišská Kapitula from above

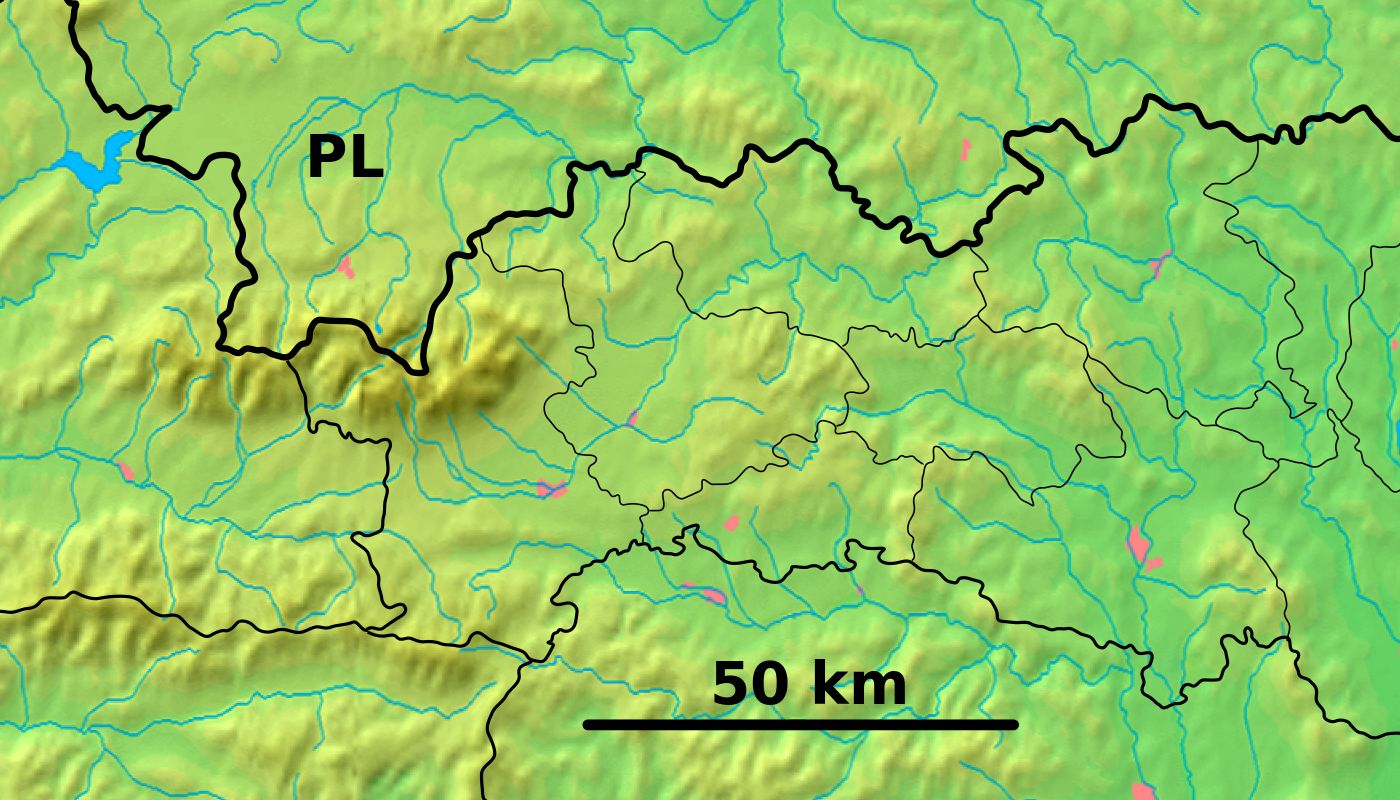
- Location of Spišská Kapitula in the Western part of the Prešov Region Spišská Kapitula (Slovakia)
- Coordinates: 49°00′N 20°45′E
- Country: Slovakia
- Region: Prešov
- District: Levoča
- Municipality: Spišské Podhradie

Spišská Kapitula
UNESCO World Heritage Site
- Interactive map of Spišská Kapitula
- Official name: Levoča, Spiš Castle and the associated cultural monuments
- Criteria: iv
- Reference: 620
- Inscription: 1993 (17th Session)

Spišská Kapitula (German: Zipser Kapitel, Hungarian: Szepeshely or Szepesi Káptalan) (both meaning the "Spiš Chapter house") is an exceptionally well-preserved ecclesiastical town on the outskirts of Spišské Podhradie, Slovakia, and overlooking Spiš Castle. It is part of the UNESCO World Heritage Site "Levoča, Spiš Castle and the associated cultural monuments".

The town consists of St. Martin's Cathedral (dedicated to St. Martin of Tours), a former monastery, and a single street, all of mediaeval construction and enclosed by a wall. The lower gate gives an extensive view of Spiš Castle, located on an opposite hill. Spišská Kapitula became the main seat of the church administration in the region in the 12th century. In 1776 it became the seat of the Diocese of Spiš (Szepes).

== Town and history ==
The town consists of St. Martin's Cathedral (dedicated to St. Martin of Tours); a former monastery; and a single street, all of medieval construction and enclosed by a wall. The lower gate gives an extensive view of Spiš Castle, located on an opposite hill.

Spišská Kapitula became the main seat of the church administration in the region in the 12th century. In 1776 it became the seat of the Diocese of Spiš (Szepes).

The cathedral was built between the 13th and 15th centuries in the Romanesque and Gothic styles. It is one of the largest and most interesting Romanesque monuments in Slovakia. It contains many medieval carved altars and is the resting place of many lords of Spiš Castle; the 15th century carved marble tombstones of the Zápolya family are of exceptional quality. A recently restored wall-painting from 1317 depicts the coronation of Charles I as the King of Hungary; another painting in the cathedral is the source for the provisional name of the anonymous Master of Kirchdrauf.

Spišská Kapitula was visited by Pope John Paul II in 1995.

== St. Martin's Cathedral ==
St. Martin's Cathedral, the Romanesque Catholic cathedral in Spišská Kapitula is a local part of the town Spišské Podhradie in the district of Levoča. It is also the parochial church. It is a Romanesque-Gothic cathedral, built in the first third of the 13th century pseudo-basilica with a central nave, two aisles and one transept. In 2003, the remains of Bishop Ján Vojtašák (1877-1965) were deposited in the cathedral.

It is one of the largest and most interesting Romanesque monuments in Slovakia. It contains many medieval carved altars and is the resting place of many lords of Spiš(Szepes) Castle; the 15th century carved marble tombstones of the Zápolya family(Zápoľský family) are of exceptional quality. A recently restored wall-painting from 1317 depicts the coronation of Charles I as the King of Hungary; another painting in the cathedral is the source for the provisional name of the anonymous Master of Kirchdrauf (the former name of Spišské Podhradie).

Spišská Kapitula became the main seat of the church administration in the region in the 12th century. In 1776 it became the seat of the Diocese of Spiš, after Hungarian queen Maria Theresa split the Diocese of Eger (now Archidiocese of Eger). The Cathedral is one of the most valuable examples of Late-Gothic and Gothic architecture in Slovakia.

== Images ==
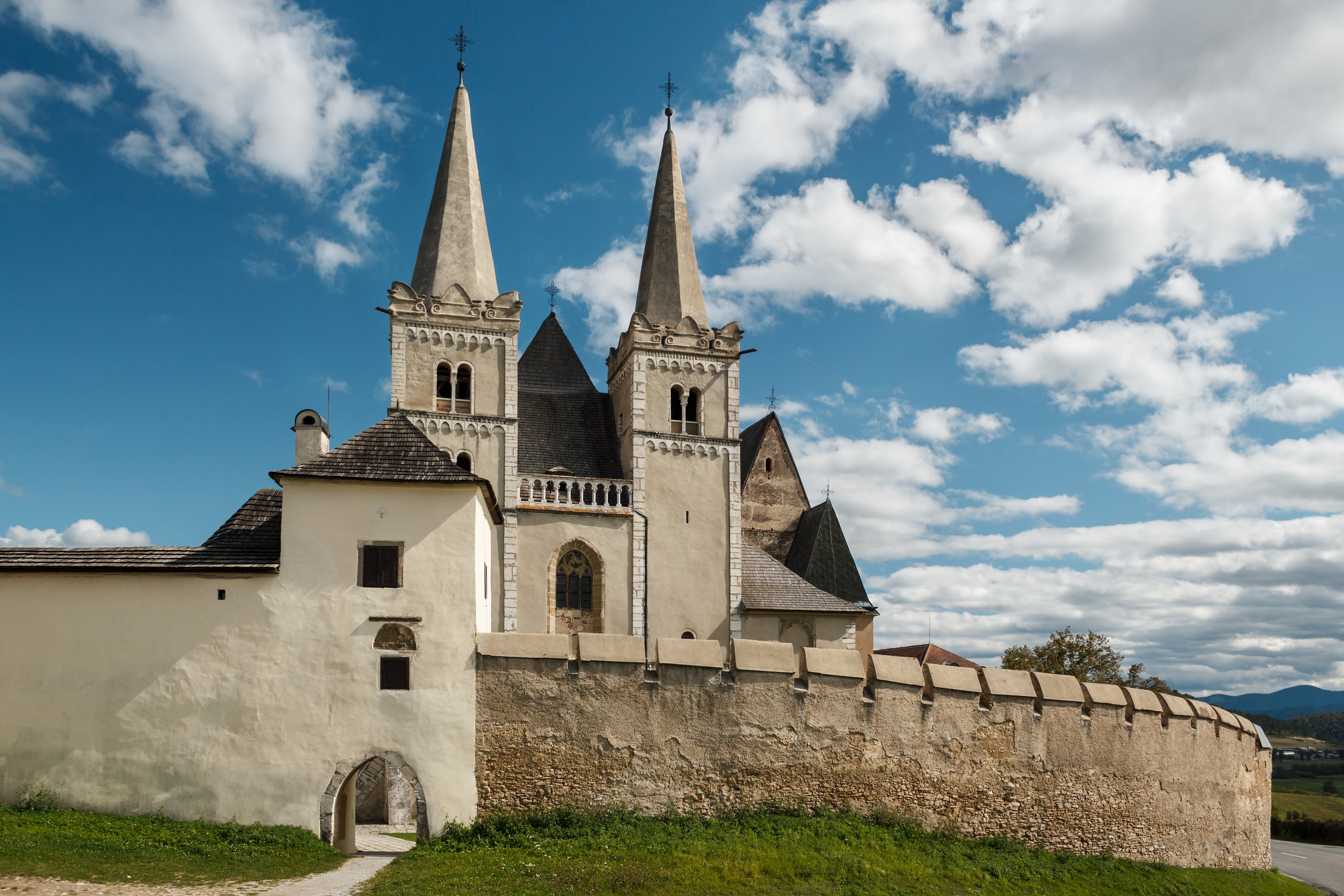
Spišská kapitula

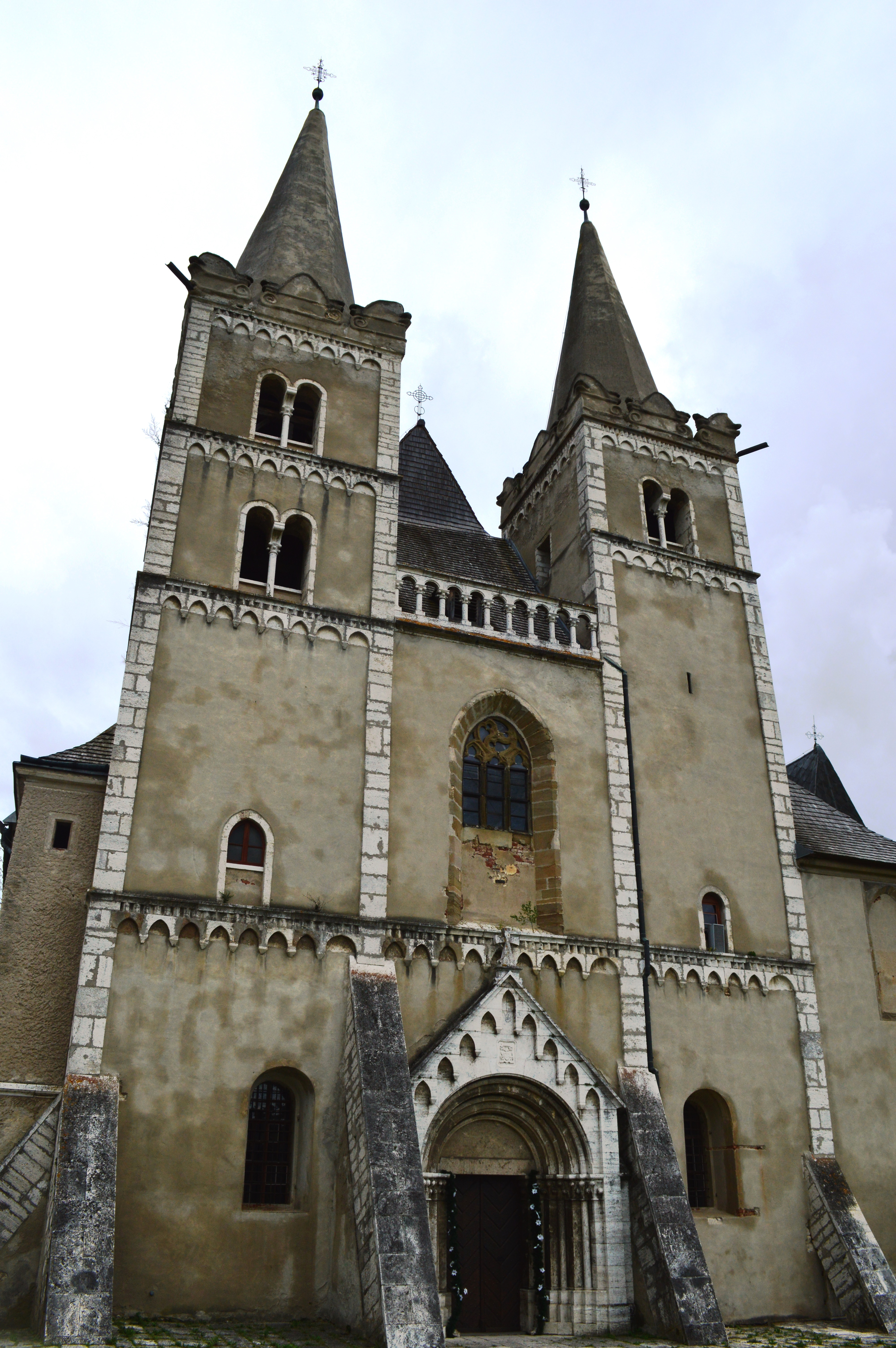
Spišská Kapitula - St. Martin's cathedral

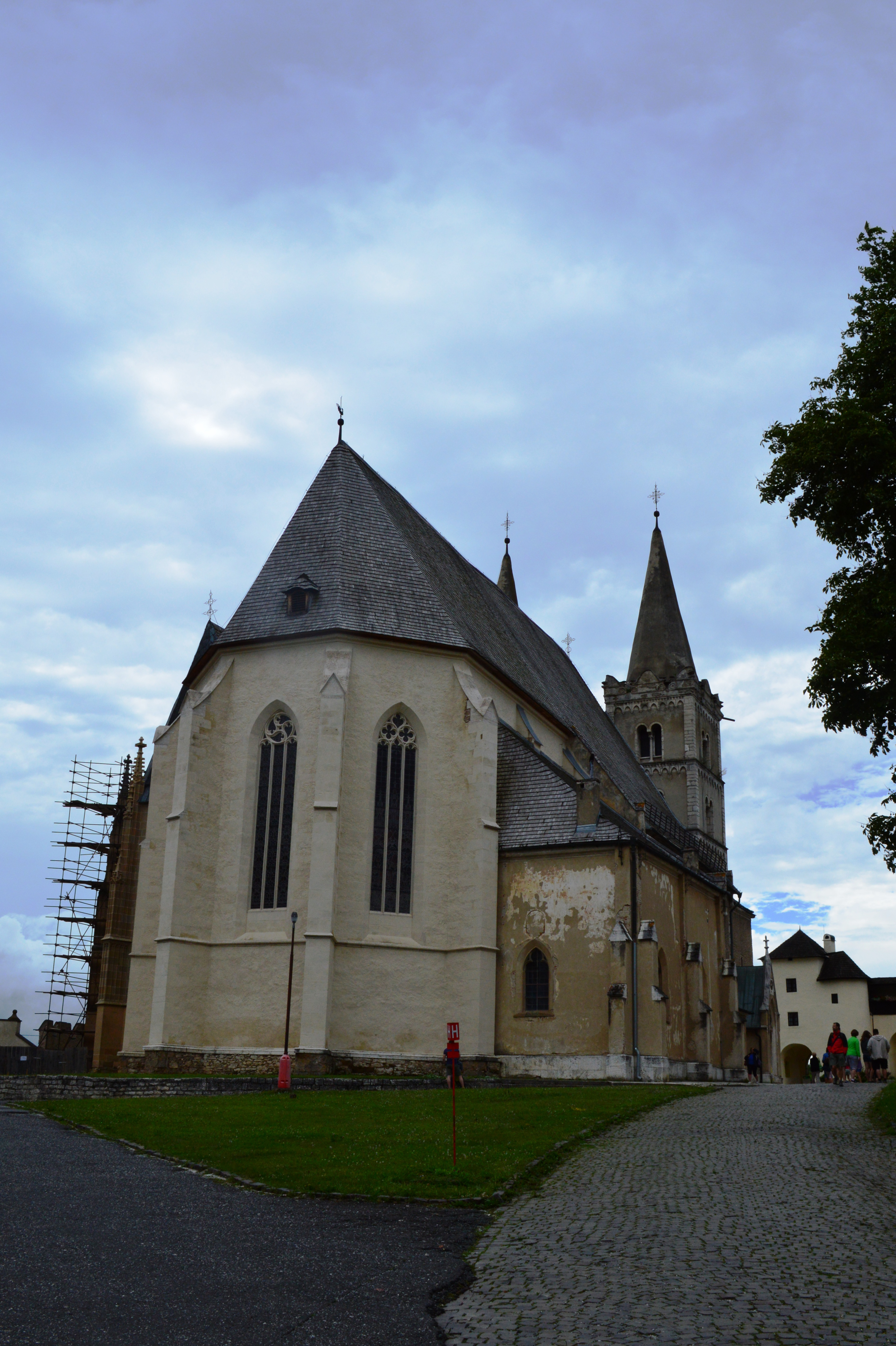
Spisska Kapitula - Cathedral apse

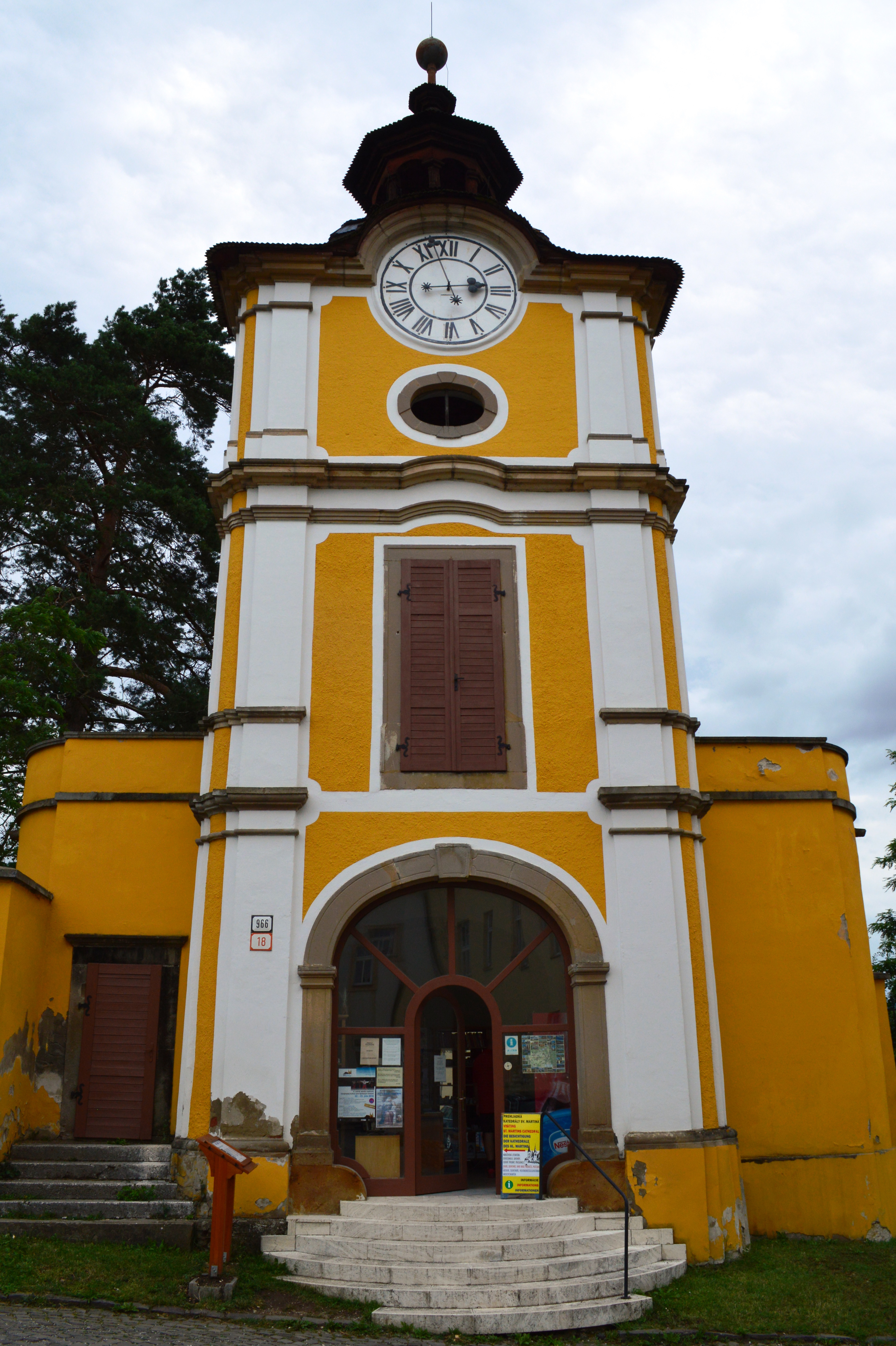
Spišská Kapitula - Bell tower

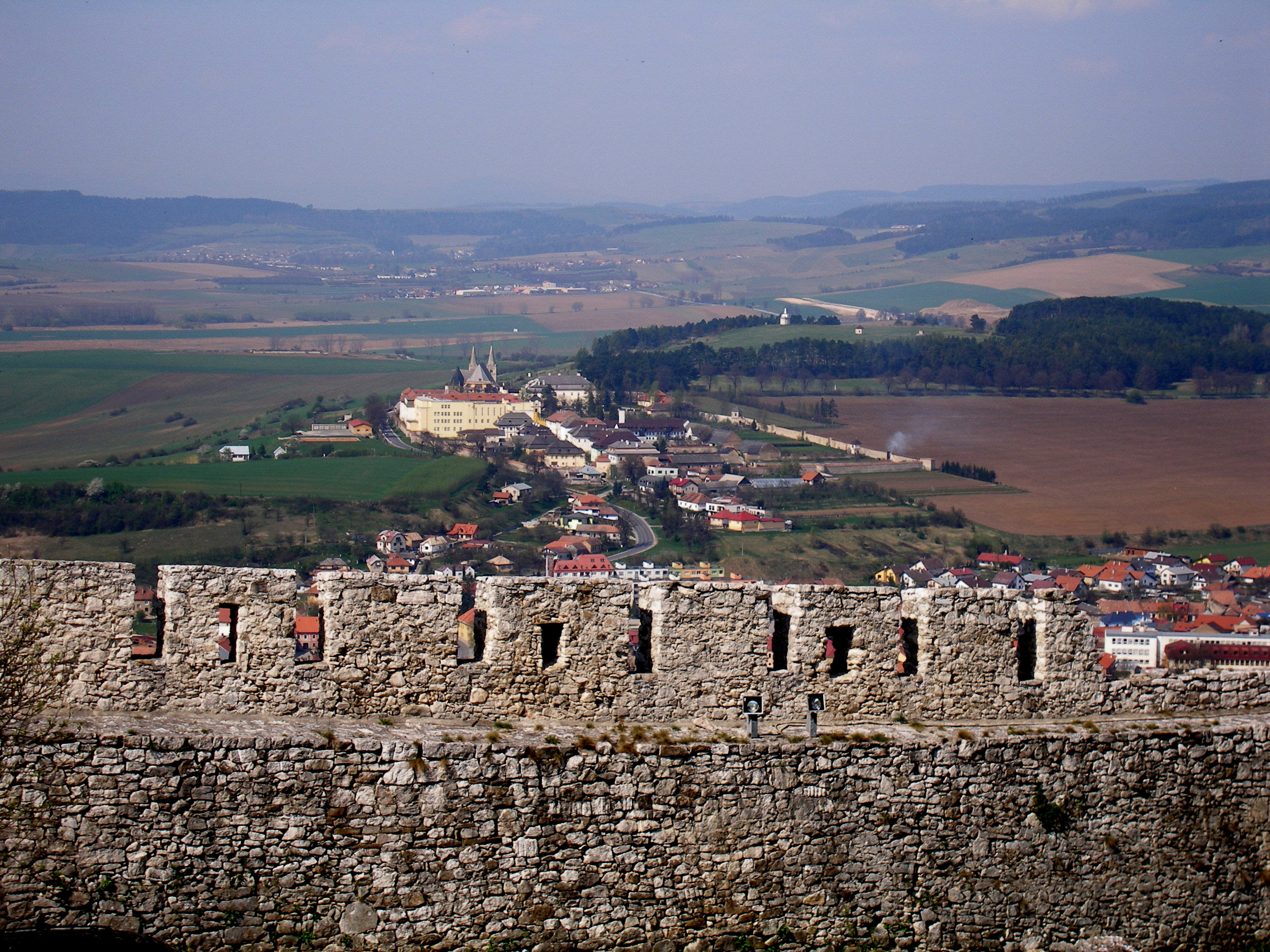
View from Spiš Castle

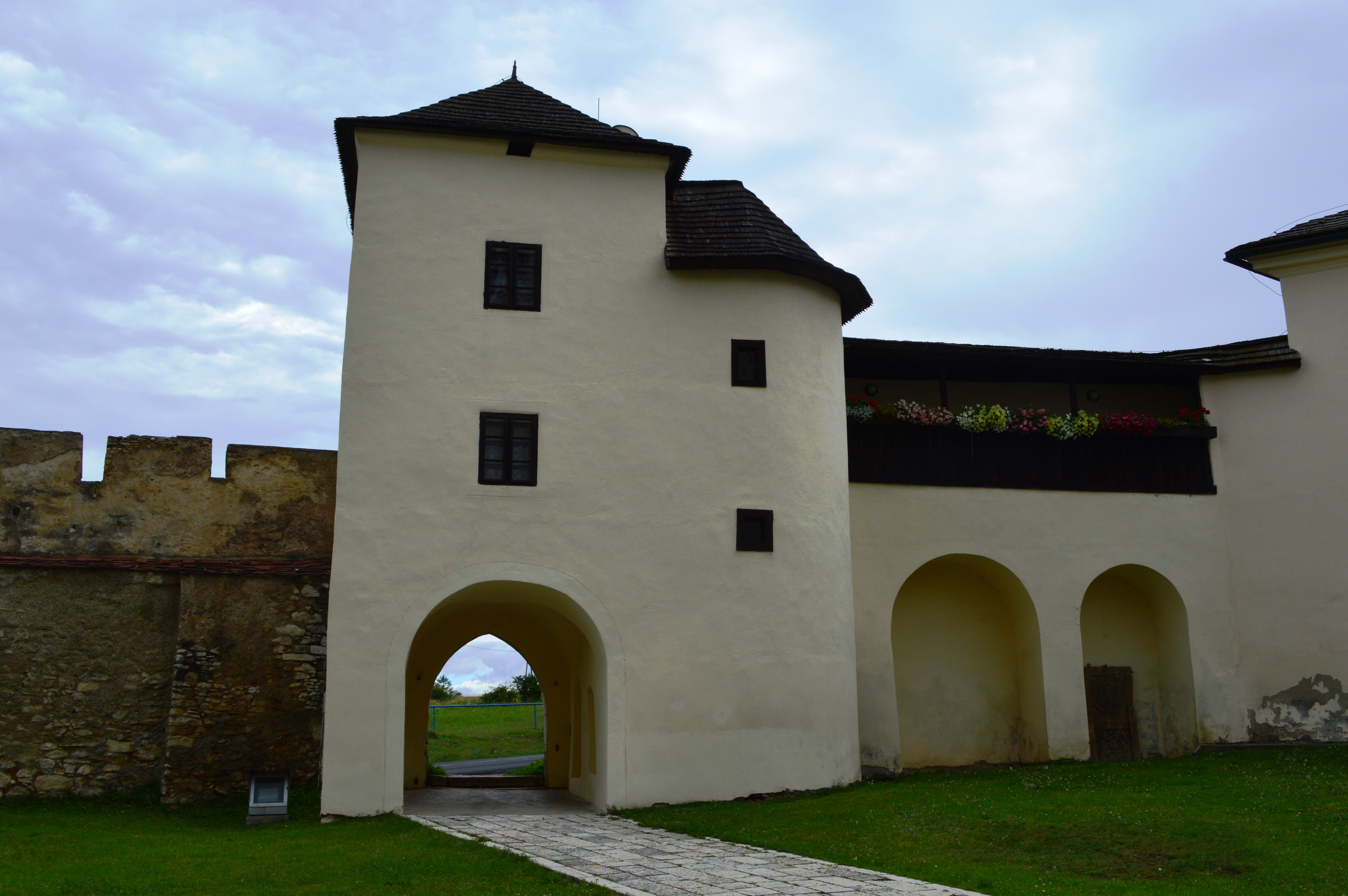
Spišská Kapitula - gateway

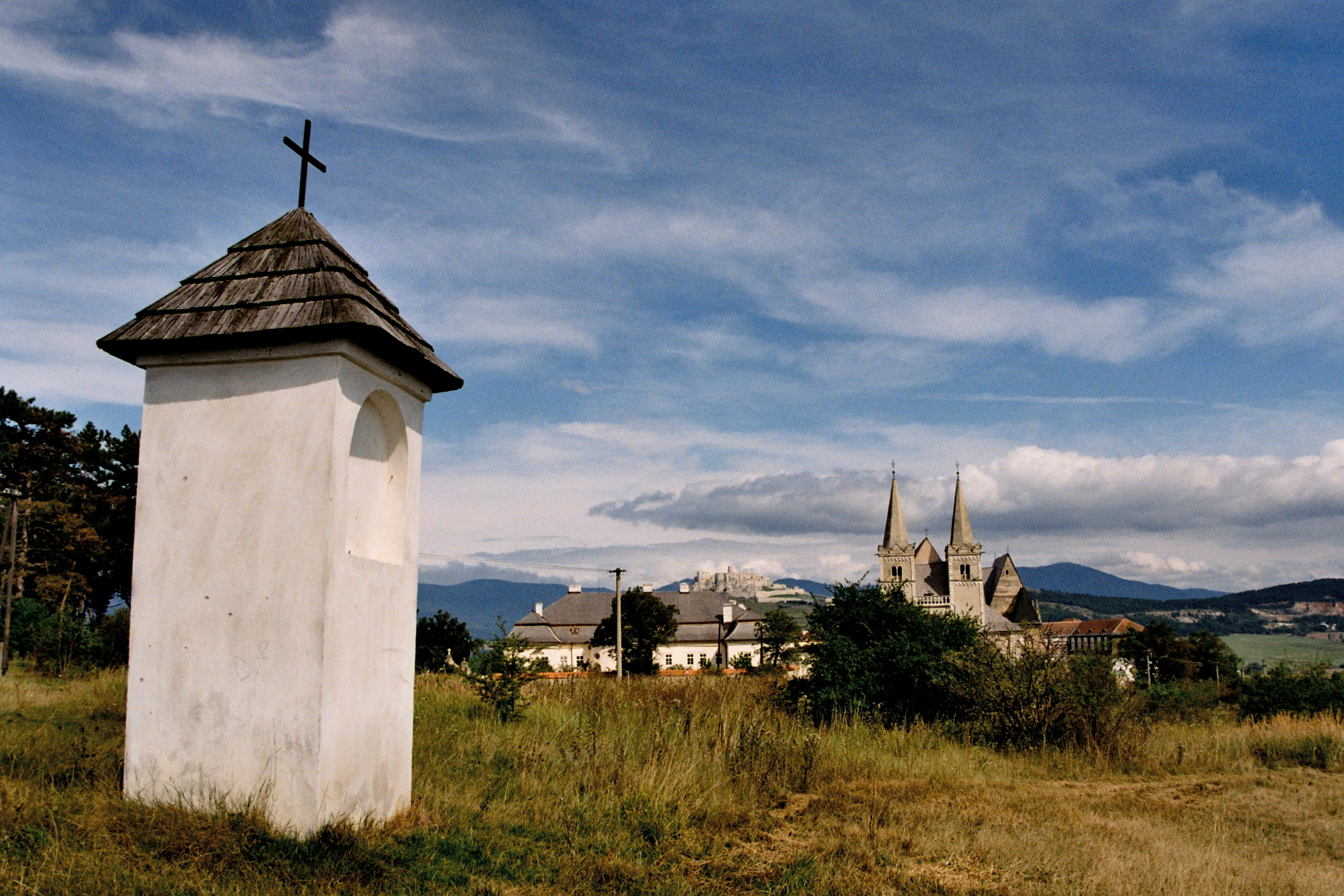
Spišská Kapitula

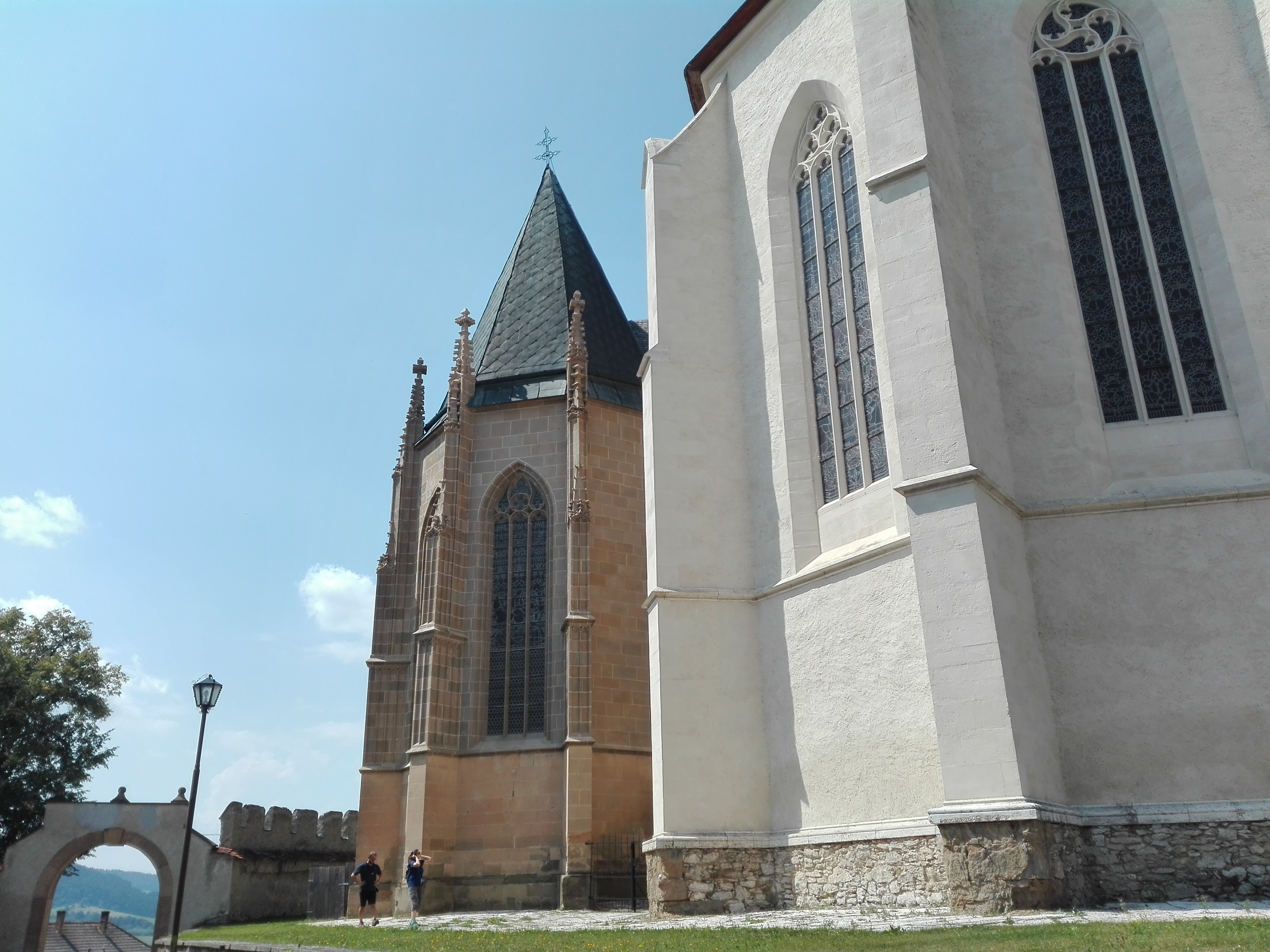
Spišská Kapitula

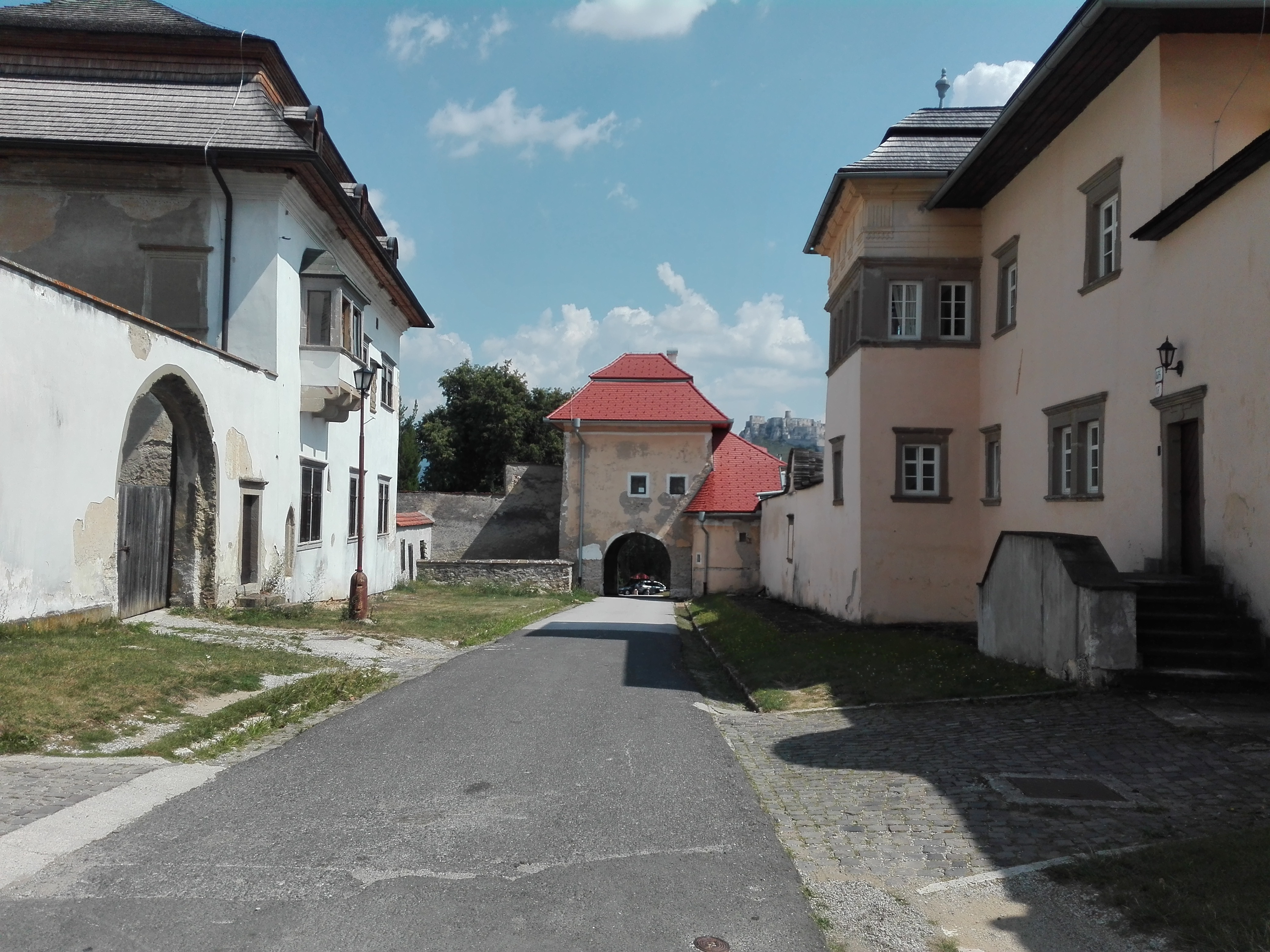
Spišská Kapitula Main Street

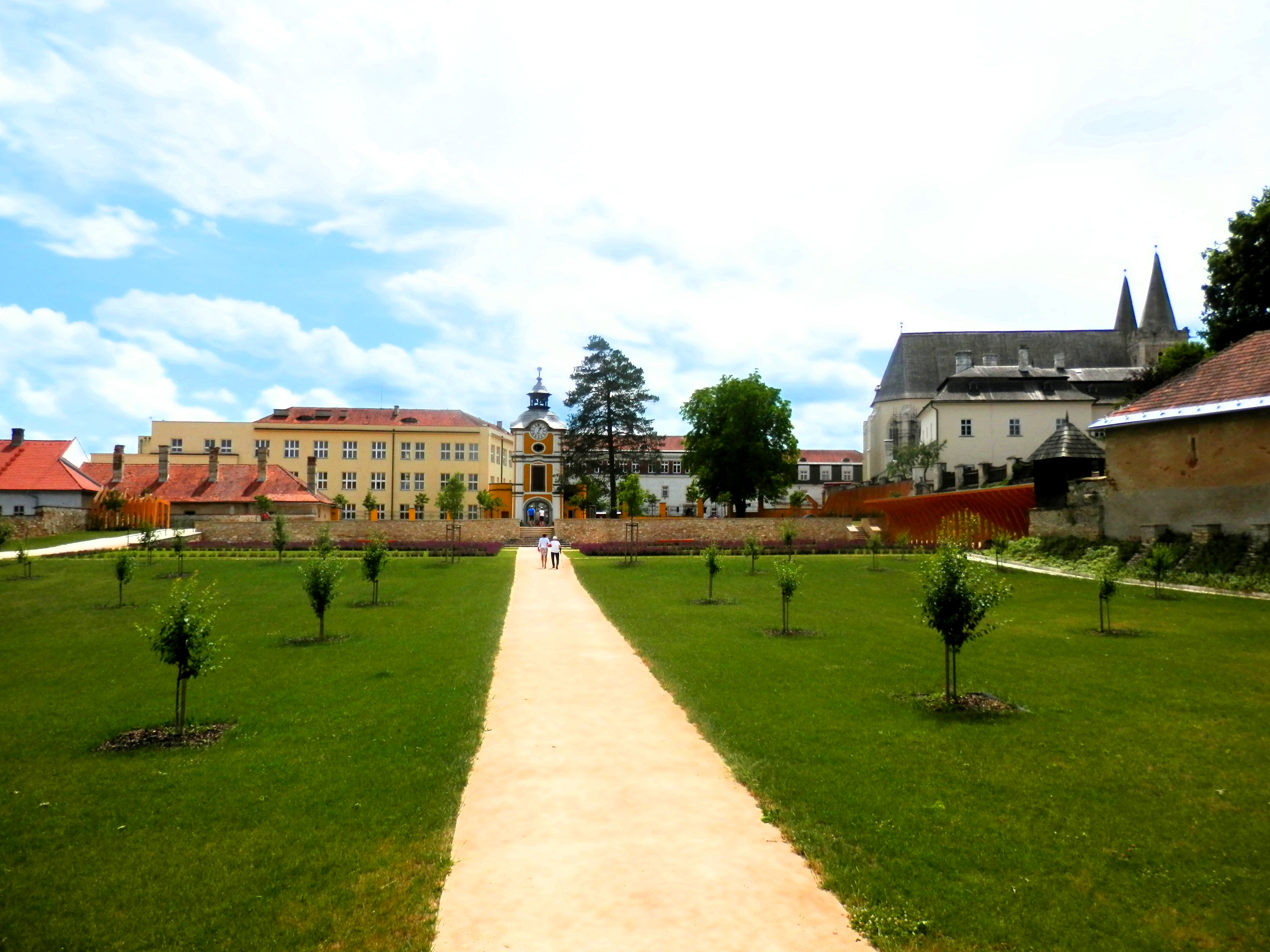
Episcopal garden
