= Diocese of Spiš =

Roman Catholic diocese in Slovakia

Diocese of Spiš Dioecesis Scepusiensis Spišská Diecéza

Catholic
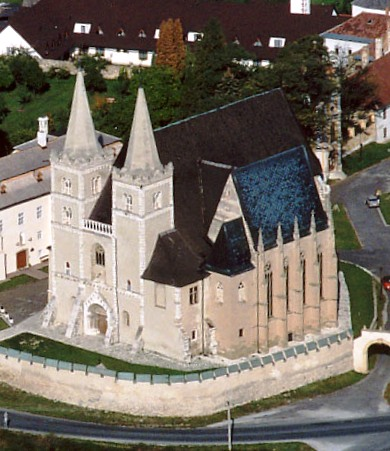
- Cathedral of St. Martin in Spišská Kapitula

- Coat of arms

Location
- Country: Slovakia
- Metropolitan: Roman Catholic Archdiocese of Košice

Statistics
- Area: 7,802 km^{2} (3,012 sq mi)
- Population: Total; Catholics: (as of 2020); ▲610,040; ▲452,310 (▼74.1%)

Information
- Denomination: Roman Catholic
- Rite: Latin Rite
- Established: 13 March 1776
- Cathedral: St. Martin's Cathedral
- Patron saint: Saint Martin of Tours

Current leadership
- Pope: Leo XIV
- Bishop: František Trstenský
- Metropolitan Archbishop: Bernard Bober
- Auxiliary Bishops: Ján Kuboš
- Bishops emeritus: Andrej Imrich

Map
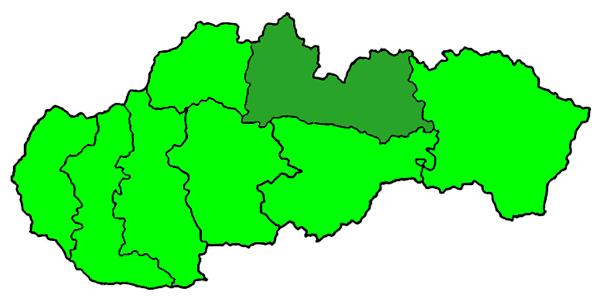
- Map of the Diocese

Website
- Website of the Diocese

The Diocese of Spiš (Slovak: Spišská diecéza, Latin: Dioecesis Scepusiensis, Hungarian: Szepesi egyházmegye) is a Latin Church diocese of the Catholic Church in northern Slovakia. It covers central and eastern parts of the Žilina Region and western part of the Prešov Region. Its seat is in Spišská Kapitula. As of 2024 the diocese covers an area of 7,802 km^{2} with 610,040 people of which 452,310 (74.1%) are of Catholic faith. There are 363 priests in the diocese.

The seat was vacant for three years after the death of bishop Štefan Sečka. On 8 September 2023, Pope Francis named František Trstenský as the new bishop. Trstenský was inaugurated on 21 October in Spišská Kapitula.

== History ==
The diocese was established in the Kingdom of Hungary on 13 March 1776 as a suffragan of the Archdiocese of Esztergom. In 1804, its metropolitan was changed to the Archdiocese of Eger. On 30 December 1977, it was taken from the former and became part of the newly created Slovak ecclesiastical province with metropolitan being the Diocese of Trnava. The last change of metropolitan took place on 31 March 1995 when it was changed to the newly elevated Archdiocese of Košice.

== List of bishops ==
=== Ordinaries ===
The following is a list of bishops of the Roman Catholic Diocese of Spiš since its establishment in 1776.

- Karol Salbeck (1776–1785)
- Ján Révay (1788–1806)
- Michael Leopold Brigido (1807–1816)
- Ján Krstiteľ Ladislav Pyrker (1818–1820), later Latin Patriarch of Venice
- József Bélik (1823–1847)
- Ladislav Zábojský (1850–1870)
- József Samassa (1871–1873), later Archbishop of Eger
- György Császka (1874–1891), later Archbishop of Kalocsa
- Pál Szmrecsányi (1891–1903), later Bishop of Oradea
- Alexander Párvy (1904–1919)
- Ján Vojtaššák (1920–1965)
  - Sede vacante (1965–1989)
- František Tondra (1989–2011)
- Štefan Sečka (2011–2020)
- František Trstenský (2023–present)

=== Auxiliary bishops ===
- Martin Kheberich (1915–1946)
- Štefan Barnáš (1949–1964)
- Andrej Imrich (1992–2015)
- Štefan Sečka (2002–2011), later bishop of Spiš
- Ján Kuboš (2020–present)
