= Peter Beňo =

Slovak Roman Catholic bishop (born 1972)

The Most Reverend Peter Beňo
- Bishop-elect of Žilina
- Church: Catholic Church
- Archdiocese: Bratislava
- Diocese: Žilina
- Appointed: 10 November 2026
- Predecessor: Tomáš Galis
- Previous posts: Auxiliary bishop of Nitra (2021–2026); Titular bishop of Amudarsa (2021–2026)

Orders
- Ordination: 14 September 1996 by Ján Chryzostom Korec
- Consecration: 24 April 2021 by Viliam Judák

Personal details
- Born: 2 September 1972 (age 54) Bánovce nad Bebravou, Czechoslovakia
- Motto: In hoc cognovimus caritatem Dei

Peter Beňo (born 2 September 1972) is a Slovak prelate of the Catholic Church who was appointed Bishop of Žilina on 10 November 2026 by Pope Leo XIV. He previously served as auxiliary bishop of the Diocese of Nitra from 2021 to 2026.

He succeeded Tomáš Galis, the first bishop of Žilina, following the acceptance of Galis's resignation. Galis was appointed apostolic administrator pending Beňo's canonical possession of the diocese.

== Early life and education ==
Beňo was born on 2 September 1972 in Bánovce nad Bebravou. He grew up in the nearby village of Prusy with his parents and younger sister. He attended primary school in Prusy and Bánovce nad Bebravou before graduating from the local gymnasium in 1990.

In 1990, he entered the Seminary of Saint Gorazd in Nitra, where he prepared for the priesthood.

== Priesthood ==
Beňo was ordained a priest on 14 September 1996 in Terchová by Ján Chryzostom Korec, Cardinal of Nitra.

Following his ordination, he served as a parochial vicar in Púchov from 1996 to 1997 and parish administrator in Nesluša from 1997 to 2002. Between 2002 and 2008, he was prefect of the Seminary of Saint Gorazd in Nitra. During this period he also taught at the Theological Institute in Nitra and the Saints Cyril and Methodius Faculty of Theology of Comenius University Bratislava.

From 2008 to 2014, he was parish priest in Soblahov. In 2014, he became parish priest in Skalka nad Váhom, where he was appointed rector of the diocesan shrine of Saints Andrew Svorad and Benedict in 2016. He also served as dean of the Trenčín deanery from 2018.

== Episcopal ministry ==
=== Auxiliary Bishop of Nitra ===
On 29 January 2021, Pope Francis appointed Beňo auxiliary bishop of Nitra and titular bishop of Amudarsa.

He received episcopal consecration on 24 April 2021 at the diocesan shrine of Saints Andrew Svorad and Benedict in Skalka nad Váhom. The principal consecrator was Viliam Judák, Bishop of Nitra, assisted by Giacomo Guido Ottonello, then apostolic nuncio to Slovakia, and Marián Chovanec, Bishop of Banská Bystrica.

His episcopal motto is In hoc cognovimus caritatem Dei ("By this we have known the love of God"), a reference to 1 John 3:16.

=== Bishop of Žilina ===
On 10 November 2026, Pope Leo XIV appointed Beňo diocesan bishop of Žilina, succeeding Tomáš Galis, who had served as the diocese's first bishop since its establishment in 2008.

The appointment was publicly announced at noon in the Cathedral of the Holy Trinity in Žilina by the apostolic nuncio to Slovakia, Nicola Girasoli. Galis was appointed apostolic administrator of the diocese until its canonical transfer to Beňo.

== See also ==
- Catholic Church in Slovakia
- Roman Catholic Diocese of Nitra
- Roman Catholic Diocese of Žilina
