= Žiar nad Hronom =

Žiar nad Hronom Garamszentkereszt
- Municipality
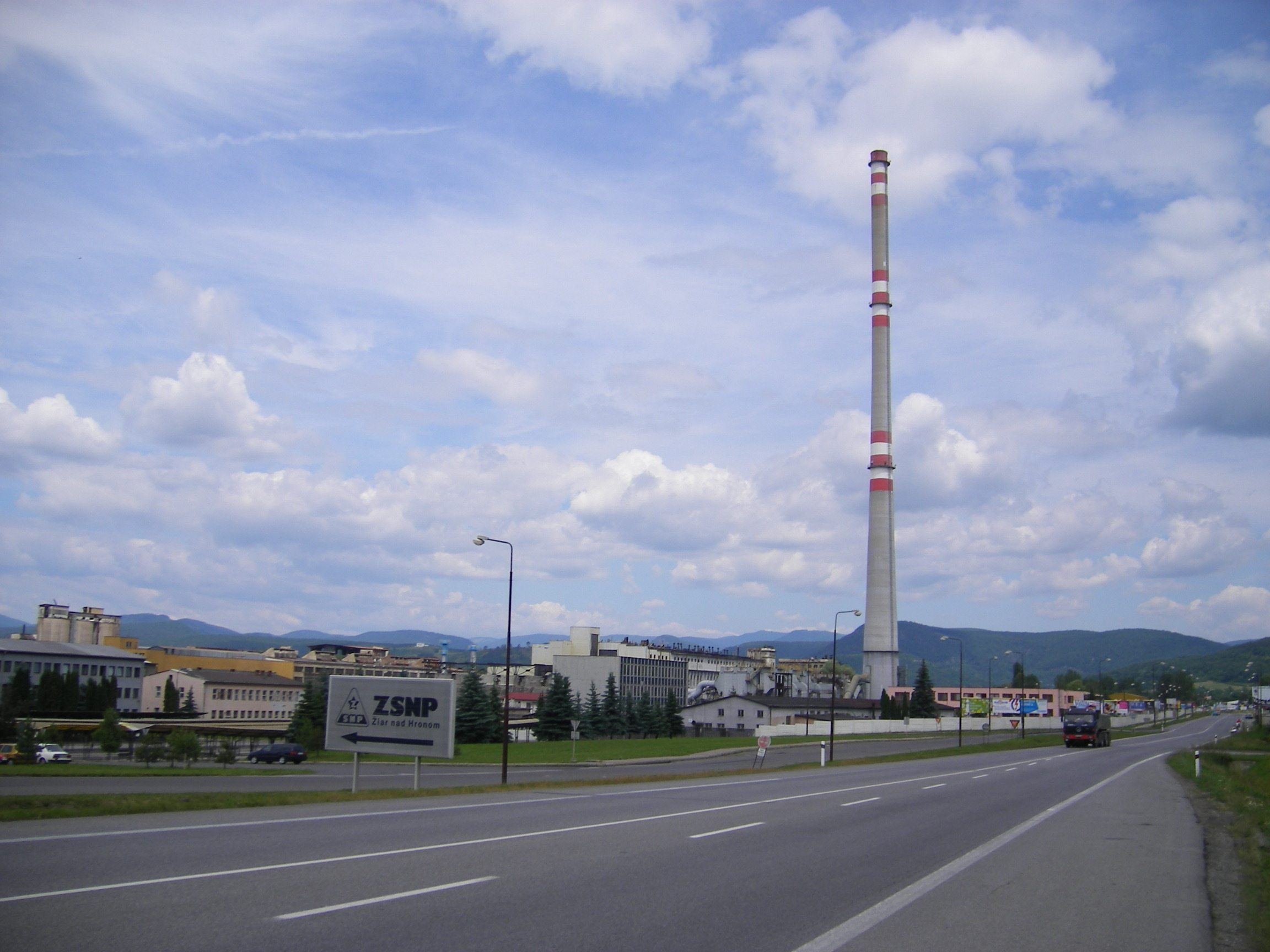
- Aluminium processing plant in Žiar nad Hronom

- Flag Coat of arms

- Location of Žiar nad Hronom in the Banská Bystrica Region Location of Žiar nad Hronom in Slovakia
- Country: Slovakia
- Region: Banská Bystrica Region
- District: Žiar nad Hronom District
- First mentioned: 1075

Government
  - Mayor: Peter Antal (Most–Híd, Smer-SD, SNS)

Area
  - Total: 39.98 km^{2} (15.44 sq mi)
- Elevation: 272 m (892 ft)

Population (2025)
  - Total: 16,433
- Time zone: UTC+1 (CET)
  - Summer (DST): UTC+2 (CEST)
- Postal code: 965 01
- Area code: +421 45
- Vehicle registration plate (until 2022): ZH
- Website: www.ziar.sk

Žiar nad Hronom (German: Heiligenkreuz (an der Gran), Hungarian: Garamszentkereszt; until 1920 Svätý Kríž and until 1955 Svätý Kríž nad Hronom) is a city in Banská Bystrica Region, Slovakia.

== History ==
=== Names ===
The name of the settlement has gone through multiple developments. Prior to 1237, the settlement was known as a place with a toll station. In 1237, first name of the settlement emerges, as a combination of Latin and Hungarian, with the town called Cristur (later Kerestúr), which translates to The Cross of the Lord. Back then, the settlement was split between the dominions of the Šášov castle and the Benedictine Abbey of Hronský Beňadik.

In 1773, the village was known as Holy Cross, in various language versions, including Latin (Sancta Crux), Hungarian (Szent Kereszt), German (Heiligs Creütz) or Slovak (Swaty Kriss). Similar names were recorded in 1808, despite minor influence caused by linguistic developments. In 1873, Hungarian name Barsszentkereszt is used, but the same changes at the turn of the 19th and 20th century into Garamszentkereszt (which translates to Holy Cross upon Hron).

After the formation of the First Czechoslovak Republic, the settlement was called Svätý Kríž nad Hronom in Slovak, copying the earlier Hungarian name. Although, historically synonymous with the settlement, the name Kerestúr was used by Zemplínska Teplica in the early 20th century. In May 1953, when aluminum manufacturing and metallurgy began to flourish in the settlement, it impacted the life and the name of the city. In combination with the anti-religious sentiment of the Czechoslovak Socialist Republic, the name was changed to the current version Žiar nad Hronom, which translates to Gleam-upon-Hron. However, the German name and the Hungarian name Garamszentkereszt and the German Heiligenkreuz (an der Gran) still reflect the old Slovak name.

=== Earliest settlement ===
Celtic tribes had lived in the area, as documented by sizable archaeologic discoveries dating to 6th century. Following the 10th century, the local population was mostly Slavic and the Celtic culture and settlement had receded.

=== Middle Ages ===
The first written record is dated to 1075, when a charter, issued by Hungarian king Géza I of Hungary, had established the Benedictine Abbey of Hronský Beňadik. On 4 February 1246 the landowner and the Archbishop of Esztergom, Stephen I Báncsa, had elevated the status of the settlement, submitting surrounding villages to the dominion and granting the citizens further rights. The settlement was submitted to the Šášov Castle.

In the same period, the village had developed into a small town and became known as an administrative and cultural core of the region, due to the growth of commerce and the rise of trade guilds.

=== Late Middle Ages and early Modernity ===
The following period, until the 16th century, saw the flourishment of guilds, like that of tailors or shoemakers.

A chateau (manor house) was erected and became the town's landmark in 1631, building on a preceding structure, on the orders of Péter Cardinal Pázmány. Later, it became a summer residence for the Archbishop of Esztergom. The manor had undergone multiple renovations due to various unrests and uprisings. One such uprising in the area was a late sequel of Anti-Habsburg rebellions, which lasted until 1621. Following the suppression of the uprising Habsburg army had remained in the area to protect from the advancing Ottoman troops, which had worried the local population. The Ottomans, eventually, had failed to conquer Banská Štiavnica some 25 kilometers south.

Even later 17th century was not easy for the local population, as the region had suffered from continued armed conflicts and plague, originating in Italy. During the conflicts the town and the Šášov castle, a hub of the rebels, were besieged and conquered. The area was badly struck by the events and it had recovered for a long time, as its economy had to be renewed. The town received the right to host fairs in 1690.

After the establishment of Diocese of Banská Bystrica and following a renovation, the chateau became the seat of the Bishop and a representative building. Štefan Moyses had resided here in the 19th century.

=== 20th century ===
The city becomes a seat of a district in 1923. The district was split between districts based in Kremnica and Nová Baňa. This was caused by the administrative reorganisation of the Czechoslovak Socialist Republic. The city had regained the status of the district seat in the 1960 and retained it after Slovak independence in 1993. The cities importance declined after 1996, when cities of Žarnovica and Nová Baňa and nearby villages, which were previously a part of the Žiar nad Hronom District, became the seats of two independent administrative districts.

During World War II the city was occupied by the German Army until 1945, when it was liberated by the advancing Red Army. The city and the surrounded areas were known hubs for partisan fighters of the Slovak National uprising.

Major socio-economic growth in the city began with the development of an aluminium plant, which was established in 1953, under the name Slovak National Uprising Works (Závody Slovenského národného povstania). This had caused a boom of employment opportunities in the city. Industrial development had essentially completed the transformation of the village or a small town into a city, as it encouraged construction of schools and housing, in form of standardised apartment blocks, as well as individual construction. Overall, the city became largely self-sufficient. Between 1969 and 1991 the city had annexed nearby villages of Lutila and Ladomerská Vieska, which are now independent. Šášovské Podhradie and a ghost village of Horné Opatovce, annexed in the same period, remain a part of the city.

In 2021, the municipality recycled 53.14% of the municipal waste.

== Governance and politics ==
During 2022 Slovak local elections, reigning mayor and former MP Peter Antal had won four consecutive elections. In this election, he ran as an independent while running with the support of cross-spectrum parties. He defeated independent candidate Petra Mazúrová.

2022 Mayoral elections Žiar nad Hronom
Party	Candidate	Votes	%	±%
Independent	Peter Antal	3,770	81.93	+4.95
Independent	Petra Mazúrová	831	18.06	new
Majority		2,939	63.87	+9.90
Turnout		4,793	32.85	+2.87
Independent hold		Swing	+4.95	

Composition of the City Council of Žiar nad Hronom following the October 2022 local elections

The City Council consisted of 19 deputies elected in five constituencies: Etapa, Stred, Centrum II + Stará časť mesta, Pod vŕšky, IBV + Šášovské Podhradie. Of the 19 deputies most ran as independent candidates.

Constituency	Elected Deputies				
Etapa	Indep	Indep	Indep	Indep	SMER
Stred (Central)	Indep	Indep	Indep	Indep	HLAS
Centrum II + Stará časť mesta (Central II + Old Town)	Indep	Indep	Indep	Indep	
Pod vŕšky	Indep	Indep			
IBV + Šášovské Podhradie	Indep	SaS, KDH			

=== Mayoral history ===
- Marián Futák – economist
- Jaroslav Cíger – veterinarian
- Márius Hrmo – lawyer
- 2002 – 2012: Ivan Černaj – entrepreneur, resigned in November 2012
- 2012 – (expected 2026): Peter Antal – lawyer, former MP

== Geography ==
The municipality lies at an altitude of 272 metres (892 ft) and covers an area of 39.98 km^{2} (15.44 sq mi) (2025).

It is located in the Žiar Basin, on the Hron river, around 40 km from Banská Bystrica and 170 km from Bratislava. In addition to the main settlement, the city includes two annexed neighbourhoods: ghost village of Horné Opatovce (since 1969) and a Šášovské Podhradie, south-east of the city, annexed in 1971. The city is the administrative seat of Žiar nad Hronom District. Average year temperature is 8 °C, with frequent rainfall.

== Demography ==
Historical population
Year	Pop.	±%
1970	12,571	—
1980	17,122	+36.2%
1991	19,612	+14.5%
2001	19,945	+1.7%
2011	19,883	−0.3%
2021	17,578	−11.6%
Source: Censuses

Population statistic (10 years)
Year	1995	2005	2015	2025
Count	20,390	19,750	19,370	16,433
Difference		−3.13%	−1.92%	−15.16%

Population statistic
Year	2024	2025
Count	16,677	16,433
Difference		−1.46%

It has a population of 16,433 people (31 December 2025).

=== Ethnicity ===
Census 2021 (1+%)
Ethnicity	Number	Fraction
Slovak	15,569	88.57%
Not found out	1861	10.58%
Romani	206	1.17%
Total	17,578	

In year 2021 was 17,578 people by ethnicity 15,569 as Slovak, 1861 as Not found out, 206 as Romani, 125 as Czech, 86 as Hungarian, 36 as Other, 28 as Russian, 25 as Rusyn, 20 as Ukrainian, 20 as German, 16 as Vietnamese, 10 as Polish, 9 as Serbian, 5 as English, 4 as Italian, 4 as Moravian, 4 as Albanian, 3 as Jewish, 3 as Chinese, 2 as Greek, 2 as Croatian, 1 as Romanian, 1 as Canadian and 1 as Bulgarian.

Note on population: The difference values of population numbers in the table "Population statistic" and in the sections "Ethnicity" & "Religion" is caused by the use of various statistical methods.

=== Religion ===
Census 2021 (1+%)
Religion	Number	Fraction
Roman Catholic Church	8094	46.05%
None	6222	35.4%
Not found out	2341	13.32%
Evangelical Church	368	2.09%
Total	17,578	

In year 2021 was 17,578 people by religion 8094 from Roman Catholic Church, 6222 from None, 2341 from Not found out, 368 from Evangelical Church, 113 from Greek Catholic Church, 100 from Christian Congregations in Slovakia, 73 from Ad hoc movements, 60 from Other, 34 from Buddhism, 28 from Other and not ascertained christian church, 25 from Calvinist Church, 22 from Eastern Orthodox Church, 22 from Paganism and natural spirituality, 14 from Church of the Brethren, 11 from Islam, 10 from United Methodist Church, 9 from Old Catholic Church, 8 from Seventh-day Adventist Church, 7 from Hinduism, 4 from Jehovah's Witnesses, 4 from Bahá'i Community, 3 from Jewish community, 3 from Baptists Church, 2 from Apostolic Church and 1 from Czechoslovak Hussite Church.

=== Historical ===
The population of the city grew until 1996 and dropped below 20,000 in 2002, not exceeding the mark since.

According to the 2001 census, the town had 19,945 inhabitants. 94.27% of inhabitants were Slovaks, 1.97% Roma, 0.95% Czechs and 0.69% Hungarians. The religious make-up was 62.07% Roman Catholics, 25.54% people with no religious affiliation and 3.19% Lutherans.

In 2011 census, had shown a population of 19 883 citizens. Of these 78.9% identified themselves as Slovaks, 2.84% as Roma, 0.5% as Czechs and 0.4% as Hungarians. Over 18% did not choose a national identification. The 2011 census was first national census with this option. In the same year, 48.75% of the city identified as Roman Catholic, 2.4% identified as Lutheran. Only one person identified as a Jew, despite city's significant Jewish population before the war.

== Economy ==
At the start of the 20th century, the town was an agricultural settlement, with citizens cultivating the fields of the Žiar Basin. After World War II, the only aluminium plant (ZSNP) in Czechoslovakia was developed in the town, with production commencing in 1953, securing thousands of work places. The Works have been a base for town's transformation into an industrial city. With the growth of the aluminium plant came the population boom, supported by domestic migration. The SNP Works were privatised in 2002, with Penta winning over 40% of the shares. Some of the old parts of the plant are no longer in use. The industrial park now houses multiple private companies.

The main employer is company Nemak Slovakia, member of Nemak Group, worldwide largest producer of aluminum powertrain parts for vehicles and the metallurgy factory company Slovalco, formerly called Závody Slovenského národného povstania ("Slovak National Uprising Works"), built in the 1950s. Currently, served by most major supermarket retailers in Slovakia, including Kaufland, Tesco, Billa or COOP Jednota, Žiar nad Hronom was one of 14 inaugural cities in Slovakia where Lidl launched its operations back in September 2004.

Hospital in Žiar nad Hronom is a part of the network of regional hospitals – Svet zdravia, a.s, which is owned by Penta Investments.

== Culture and community ==
=== Landmarks ===
- Šášov castle – A ruin of gothic castle, dated first half of the 13th century, guarding the Hron gorge. It is located in the city's part of Šášovské Podhradie. The first written record dates back to 1253. The castle became a royal castle in the 14th century. It had multiple owners in the difficult 17th century. It was captured by the anti-Habsburg Kuruc troops of Emeric Thököly and later regained by the imperial army. As its importance declined and due to numerous falls, the fortress was abandoned in the 18th century.
- Roman Catholic Church of the Exaltation of the Holy Cross – A single-nave, classical church with two towers and a rectangular presbytery. It was built on top of an older structure at the initiative of the Bishop of Banská Bystrica Gabriel Zerdahely. The facade is dominated by a portico of Toscan pillars, topped by a triangular tympanum, bearing Bishop Zerdahely's coat of arms. The segmented attic is decorated by a Latin inscription reading: "Fugite partes adversae" ("Begone, all evil powers!", as written in the prayer of exorcism by St. Anthony of Padua). The towers are lined with pilasters and topped with a crowning ledge. A crypt below the church contains the remains of Štefan Moyses and Michal Chrástek.
- Roman Catholic Church of St. Lawrence in Horné Opatovce – The historically gothic structure with polygonal presbytery and an ejected tower was reconstructed between 1710 and 1711, 1777 and finally in 1911, which added some Neo-Roman elements. Facade is decorated by frieze, supportive pillars and chambranles. The tower is topped by a pyramid helmet.
- Bishop's chateau – The four-wing, three-level building with two corner towers and from the late-Renaissance and Baroque era, from 1631. It is built on top of medieval foundation. The last major reconstruction took place between 1850 and 1869, when the upper floor was built. Chateau's facade is decorated by chambranle windows and window cornices. The chateau neighbours a park, which was developed in the second half of the 18th century.

=== Monuments ===
- Štefan Moyses Statue at Matica slovenská Square
- Ladislav Exnár Monument at Dr. Jánsky Street
- Michal Chrástek Monument
- Karol Dúbravský Monument

=== Museums ===
- Archaeological Exposition and Gallery of the Archaeological Institute of Slovak Academy of Sciences

=== Observatories ===
- Regional Maximilián Hell Observatory and Planetarium

=== Events ===
The village of Horné Opatovce had been through a turbulent period after the construction of aluminium plant in Žiar nad Hronom. The plant was in the immediate proximity of the village. When the production had commenced, technological standards and processes were insufficient to sustain the life in the settlement. Fauna had begun to disappear from the area and the public health had deteriorated. The village was repeatedly covered by fine ashes from the nearby plant chimneys. The government had decided to abolish the village by decree in 1969. Majority of the original population had resettled to then-expanding town of Žiar nad Hronom, as well as nearby village of Hliník nad Hronom, or other major cities across the country. Natives and their relatives meet annually in the St. Lawrence Church in the village and commemorate their village of origin.

Žiarsky jarmok (translates to 'Žiar Fair', historically known as Svätokrížsky jarmok) is annual event hosted in October. It is a continuation of a historic tradition of trading fairs hosted by towns and cities across the country, where craftsman, artisans and other smiths met and traded their works. The Fair was one of the better-known fairs across Slovakia. Contemporarily, it is popular for its entertainment, rides, musical performances, traditional food or game stalls. In 2023, it attracted roughly 20 thousand visitors from the city and the neighbouring regions, 350 seller stalls and 80 food and beverage sellers.

During the ball season (in Slovakia the season usually lasts between the Epiphany, lasting until Ash Wednesday), the municipality organises a City ball. It serves as an opportunity for socialisation of citizens, as well as persons of domestic and foreign cultural, social and professional lives. It enjoys relatively high turnouts and good reviews among the attendees.

City Fest is an annual one-day summer festival, taking place in Štefan Moyses Park. It usually take place in August. It enjoys large crowds from the city, region and beyond. Annually, it features leading artists of Slovak and Czech pop music. Usually, in the early hours, it features children's artists, followed by local and regional musicians in the afternoon, followed by headliners until the night.

== Transport ==
The city is intersected by the R1 Expressway, with an exit near Šášovské Podhradie. Road I/9 leads to Prievidza. R2 serves for transit purposes, surpassing the city, connecting on to I/9 and R1. R2 line was required due to urban roads having insufficient capacity, to accommodate contemporary traffic. The connection to the highway system and the geographical location make Žiar nad Hronom a notable crossroad. Road I/65 passes through Horné Opatovce and the neighbouring village of Ladomerská Vieska.

Public transport in the city is appropriate for its size and population, consisting entirely of a bus fleet. Services are more frequent in the morning and in the afternoon. Its serves two major purposes: commute of the workforce to and from the industrial park south of the city and the commute of children to and from schools. It also serves the population of nearby villages, mainly Lutila and Ladomerská Vieska.

The Nové Zámky – Zvolen railway passes through the city, allowing travel to Bratislava, as well as Košice. The train station became more notable with the construction of the SNP Works in the 1950s, due to the railways being a major mean of sourcing raw materials and shipment of the products.

== Education ==
There are 4 primary schools in the city (numbered I., II., IV. and a Catholic Štefan Moyses' Primary School), for children aged 6–15. Additionally, there are multiple kindergartens in the city.

Middle (high) schools, for students aged 15–19, number five:

- Milan Rúfus' Gymnasium at Ján Kollár St.
- Private Business Academy
- Private Technical High Schools
- Hotel Academy
- Private Pedagogical and Social Academy EBG

== Twin towns – sister cities ==
Žiar nad Hronom is twinned with:

- Svitavy, Czech Republic

== Notable people ==
- Rozália Danková (1920–2017), Roman Catholic nun
