= Tomáš Galis =

His Excellency Tomáš Galis
- Emeritus Bishop of Žilina
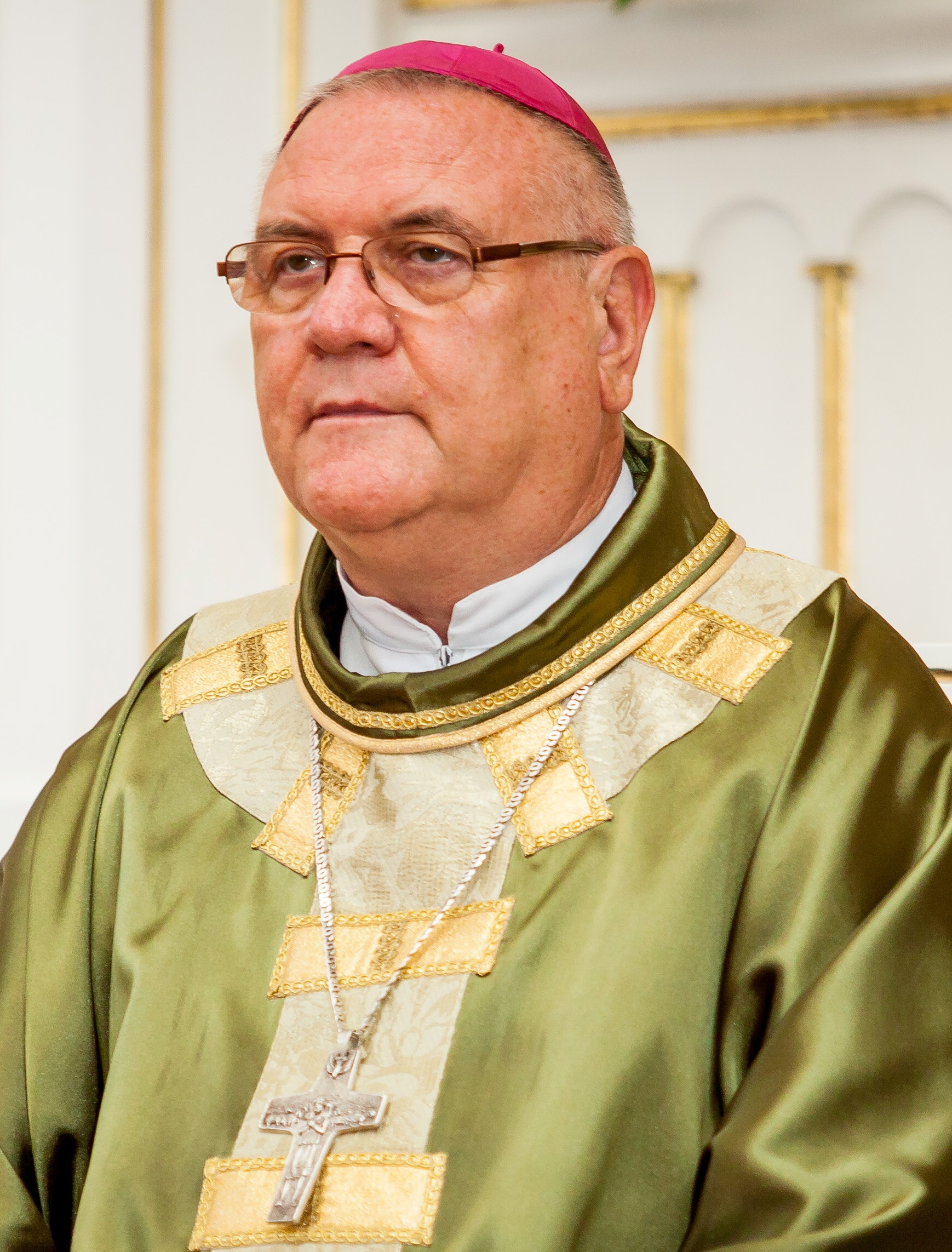
- Church: Roman Catholic Church
- Diocese: Roman Catholic Diocese of Žilina
- Installed: 14 February 2008
- Term ended: 10 November 2026
- Successor: Peter Beňo
- Previous posts: Auxiliary Bishop of Banská Bystrica, Slovakia

Orders
- Ordination: 6 June 1976
- Consecration: 25 September 1999 by Rudolf Baláž
- Rank: Bishop

Personal details
- Born: 22 December 1950 (age 75) Selice
- Denomination: Roman Catholic
- Residence: Bishop's House, Žilina
- Motto: PER MARIAM AD JESUM
- Coat of arms: Tomáš Galis's coat of arms

Tomáš Galis (born 22 December 1950 in Selice) is the emeritus bishop of the Roman Catholic Diocese of Žilina.

Tomáš Galis was born, the first of five children to Stephen Galis and Christine Šprláková. In 1966 he completed the basic nine-year school certificate in Vrútky. In 1969 he graduated from college in Vrútky. From 1 October 1969 to 30 September 1973, he studied at the Roman Catholic Faculty of Theology in Bratislava. In the period from 1 October 1973 to 30 September 1975 he performed military service.

He was ordained 2 June 1976 and received priestly ordination 6 June 1976 at the Cathedral of St. Martin in Bratislava. He was consecrated by Julius Gábriš, apostolic administrator of Trnava.

In 2020, Bishop Tomáš Galis was appointed as president of Caritas Slovakia.
