= Caritas Slovakia =

Social welfare and humanitarian relief organisation of the Catholic Church in Slovakia

- Slovenská katolícka charita
- Abbreviation: SKCH
- Established: 19 January 1927; 99 years ago
- Type: Nonprofit
- Tax ID no.: 2020682818
- Legal status: Church organisation Confederation of public associations (canon law)
- Purpose: social services
- Location: Bratislava, Slovakia
- Coordinates: 48.1432°N 17.1050°E
- Region served: Slovakia
- Official language: Slovak
- President: Bishop Tomáš Galis
- Affiliations: Caritas Europa, Caritas Internationalis
- Website: www.charita.sk

Caritas Slovakia (Slovak: Slovenská katolícka charita or "Slovak Catholic Charity", short: SKCH) is a not-for-profit social welfare organisation in Slovakia. It is a service of the Catholic Church in Slovakia.

Caritas Slovakia refers to both the national office and the confederation with its 10 local member organisations. It is a member of both Caritas Europa and Caritas Internationalis.

== History ==
The origin of Caritas Slovakia is similar to that of other national Caritas organisations. It was formed by uniting various fragmented and uncoordinated Church-organised charitable activities into a single, cohesive organisation with a national headquarters and regional branches within different Catholic dioceses. This model mirrors the development of Caritas organisations in countries like Germany (Caritas Germany, established in 1897), Switzerland (Caritas Switzerland, established in 1901), Austria (Caritas Austria, established in 1903), and the United States (Catholic Charities, established in 1910).

The first Caritas organisation at diocesan level in Czechoslovakia was established in 1922 in the Archdiocese of Olomouc, followed by other dioceses. The national Caritas Slovakia was founded in 1927, under the name Central Carita in Slovakia (Ústredná karita na Slovensku or ÚKS). This organisation later developed into the Caritas Slovakia of today.

In 1928, the different Caritas organisations of Czechoslovakia (Czech, Moravian-Silesian and Slovak) united in a country-wide network to form the Imperial Headquarters of Charity Unions in Czechoslovakia (Říšské ústředí Svazů charity v Československu), which is considered to be the predecessor of Caritas Czech Republic.

In the 1920s, the different local Caritas organisations in Slovakia organised charitable work for the poor, including children and the unemployed, such as the distribution of food and clothes. The organisation also published two magazines: the eponymous Caritas magazine, as well as the children's magazine Srdiečko.

During the Second World War and its immediate aftermath, Caritas Slovakia provided aid to refugees, orphaned children, the starving, those missing due to the war, as well as persons with disabilities. It established health clinics, dental clinics for children, kindergartens, homes for abandoned children, and shelters for poor and unemployed persons. However, after the 1948 Czechoslovak coup d'état, the Churches social and charitable establishments were nationalised, as the new regime viewed the Catholic Church as an ideological enemy.

By the 1950s, most activities were suppressed, and Caritas was only allowed to manage the charitable homes for old and sick priests and religious sisters from closed and dissolved monasteries.

It is only after the Gentle Revolution in 1989 and the fall of communism in Czechoslovakia that Caritas Slovakia was able to return to its original mission. In 1991, the Bishops' Conference of Slovakia decided to formally restore charity activities in the individual dioceses. As a result, 10 diocesan Caritas organisations were established with headquarters in Bratislava, Trnava, Nitra, Žilina, Banská Bystrica, Rožňava, Spišská Nová Ves, Prešov and Košice were gradually established.

In addition, the name of the organisation was changed from Central Carita in Slovakia (ÚKS) to Slovak Catholic Charity (SKCH; or Caritas Slovakia in English). In 1995, the diocesan and archdiocesan Caritas organisations became legally independent and currently form a confederation of 10 equal members united in Caritas Slovakia.

During the 1990s and 2000s, the work of Caritas Slovakia developed significantly across the country and contributed to the development of social care and health care in Slovakia.

== Structure ==
Caritas is a confederation with a national office of the same name and 10 independent member organisations. These are:

Member organisation (Slovak name)	Member organisation (English name)	Operating area	Headquarters
Bratislavská arcidiecézna charita	Bratislava Archdiocese Charity	Archdiocese of Bratislava	Bratislava
Trnavská arcidiecézna charita	Trnava Archdiocese Charity	Archdiocese of Trnava	Trnava
Arcidiecézna charita Košice	Košice Archdiocesan Charity	Archdiocese of Košice	Košice
Gréckokatolícka charita Prešov	Greek Catholic Charity Prešov	Archeparchy of Prešov	Prešov
Diecézna charita Nitra	Nitra Diocesan Charity	Diocese of Nitra	Nitra
Diecézna charita Žilina	Žilina Diocesan Charity	Diocese of Žilina	Žilina
Diecézna charita Banská Bystrica	Banská Bystrica Diocesan Charity	Diocese of Banská Bystrica	Banská Bystrica
Diecézna charita Rožňava	Rožňava Diocesan Charity	Diocese of Rožňava	Rožňava
Spišská katolícka charita	Spiš Catholic Charity	Diocese of Spiš	Spiš
Gréckokatolícka eparchiálna charita Košice	Greek Catholic Eparchial Charity Košice	Eparchy of Košice	Košice

== Work ==
Caritas Slovakia – both national and diocesan organisations – is one of the largest charitable organisations in Slovakia. It employs approximately 1,300 staff members and engages around 1,000 volunteers. Together, they assist over 23,000 people in need each year through more than 300 facilities and services spread across the country.

The services provided include support for seniors, terminally ill individuals, people with physical or mental disabilities, children, mothers with children in crisis situations, individuals with severe disabilities, and homeless people, focusing primarily on health and social care. Caritas Slovakia also offers humanitarian assistance within the country and the wider region, such as aiding victims of natural disasters, like the 2021 South Moravia tornado, and supporting Ukrainians who arrived in large numbers following the 2022 Russian invasion of Ukraine.

Support also targets Roma communities and people victim of human trafficking.

At the international level, the national office is active in humanitarian and development projects in collaboration with partners abroad, supporting initiatives in countries such as Uganda, Rwanda, India, Vietnam, Albania, Kenya, Kazakhstan, Ukraine, and Haiti. As a member of Caritas Internationalis and Caritas Europa, Caritas Slovakia's activities are globally coordinated and connected with other charitable organizations worldwide.
