= St Francis Xavier Cathedral (Banská Bystrica, Slovakia) =

Cathedral of St Francis Xavier
- Katedrála svätého Františka Xaverského
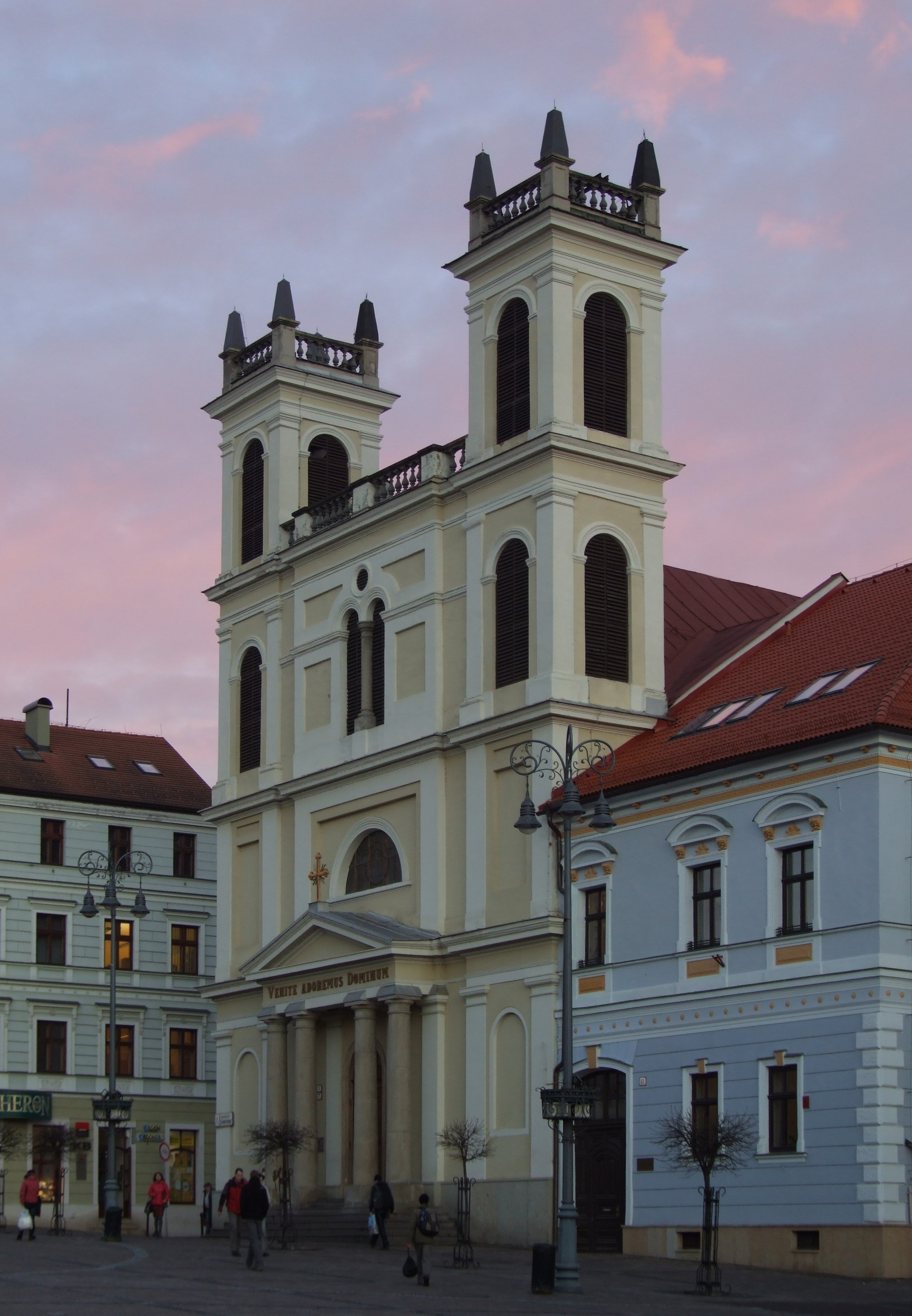

- Location in Slovakia
- 48°44′08″N 19°08′47″E
- Location: Banská Bystrica
- Country: Slovakia
- Denomination: Roman Catholic
- Website: www.katedralabb.sk

History
- Dedication: St Francis Xavier
- Consecrated: 24 September 1715

Architecture
- Architectural type: Church
- Style: Baroque
- Years built: 1702-1715

Administration
- Diocese: Banská Bystrica

Clergy
- Bishop: Marián Chovanec
- Rector: Ján Krajčík

The Francis Xavier Cathedral, Banská Bystrica (Slovak: Katedrála svätého Františka Xaverského, usually called Kapitulský kostol meaning "Chapter Church") is the cathedral church of the Roman Catholic Diocese of Banská Bystrica, located at the Slovak National Uprising Square in Banská Bystrica, Slovakia.

== History ==
There was a first mention of a gothic chapel at this spot in the so-called Königsberger's testament from 1503. It was the only place of Roman Catholic worship during the 16th century, when Banská Bystrica was in the hands of the Protestants.

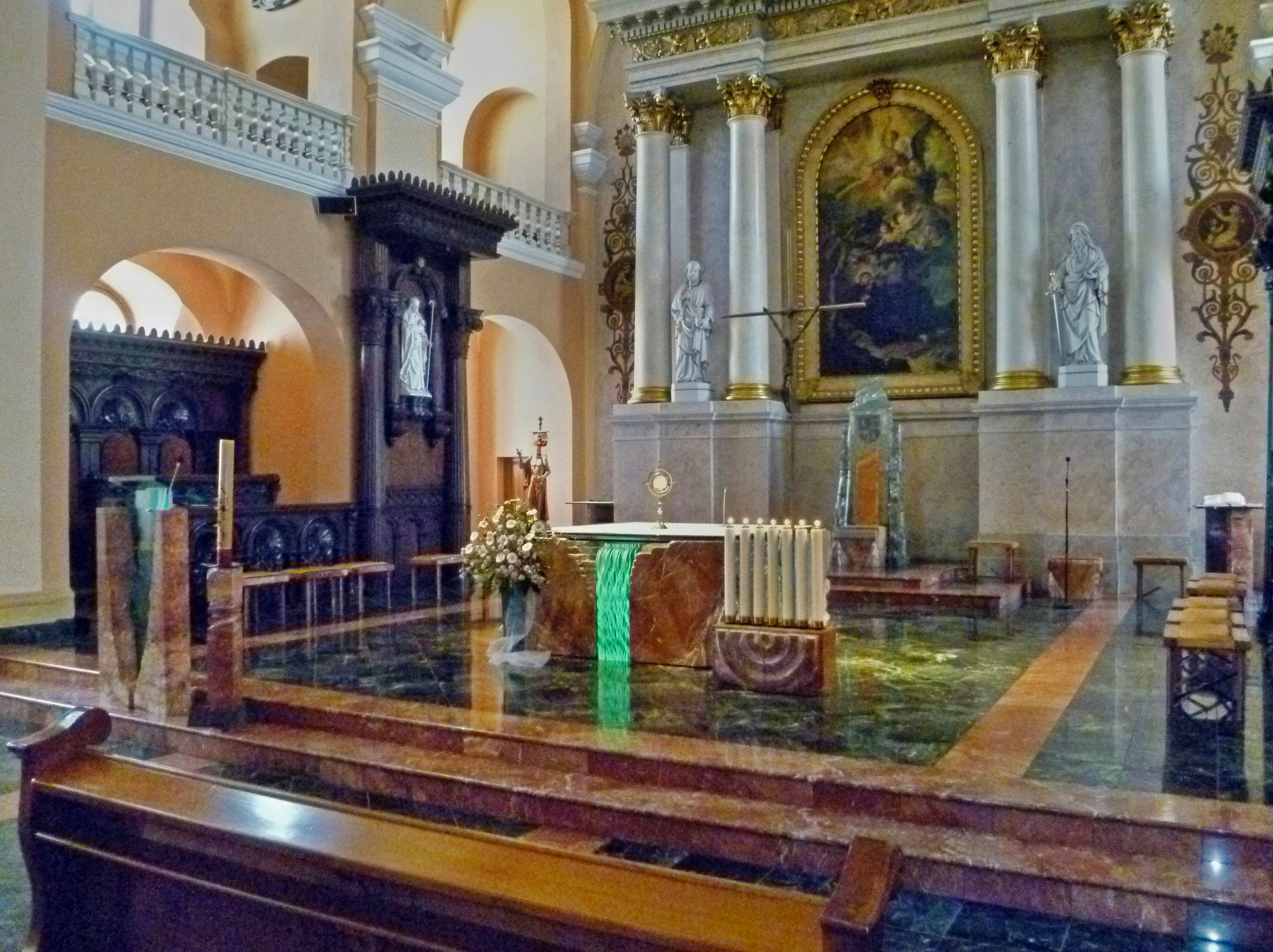
The choir of the church

In 1647 a few Jesuits settled here and started the Catholic reform of the town and its neighbourhood. During the years 1695–1701 they built their own college on the Königberger's site. They started the building of the church in 1702 as a copy of the Church of the Gesu in Rome.

Construction came to a halt when in 1703 when the town was occupied by the anti-Habsburg troops of Francis II Rákóczi. Building resumed in 1709 and on 24 September 1715, the Church of St. Francis Xavier was consecrated. At that time, the church was a Baroque building with a single nave and six chapels. The façade lacked a tower. The Jesuits were forced to leave the church in July 1773 when the Order was suppressed by Pope Clement XIV.

The cathedral has been the seat of the diocese since 1776.

The two onion-shaped towers were added in 1844 during an extensive rebuilding. The nave of the church and the side galleries were lengthened and a consistory was added to the church.

Another modification was performed in 1880. The towers were rearranged and a romantic balustrade was added. In the 1970s the interior was refurbished and, together with the façade, was painted. The exterior was renovated in 1999. In 2003 a new pipe organ was installed.

== See also ==
- List of cathedrals in Slovakia
- List of Jesuit sites
