= Kerestur =

Kerestur may refer to:

1. Deutschkreutz, a town in Austria, named "Kerestur" in Croatian
2. Ruski Krstur, a village in Serbia, named "Ruski Kerestur" in the Pannonian Rusyn language
3. Historical name for Zemplínska Teplica a village in east Slovakia.
