= SNP Square =

A number of squares are named after the Slovak National Uprising, SNP for short.

These include:

- SNP Square (Bratislava)
- SNP Square (Banská Bystrica)
