= Božetěch =

Božetěch is a Czech surname turned first name. The Slovak version is Božetech. The name can refer to several people in particular:

- Božetěch, a medieval monk, sculptor
- Emilián Božetěch Glocar
- Jozef Božetech Klemens
