= Feranec =

Feranec (feminine: Ferancová) is a Slovak surname. Notable people with the surname include:

- Jozef Feranec (1910–2003), Slovak Roman Catholic bishop
- Milan Feranec (1964–2025), Czech politician
- Peter Feranec (born 1964), Slovak conductor
