= Mária Balážová =

Slovak artist

- Born: 31 August 1956 (age 69); Trnava, Czechoslovakia
- Education: Academy of Muse Arts in Bratislava
- Known for: Painting, Drawing, Printmaking, Sculpture
- Movement: Geometric abstraction, Hard-edge, Post-geo

Mária Balážová (born 31 August 1956) is a contemporary Slovak artist. Her practise as an artist is usually associated with new geometry, post-geometry and postmodern.

== Life and work ==
Balážová studied at the Academy of Muse Arts, Bratislava and Magister of Arts degree received in 1984. Since 1997, Balážová is also known as a teacher at the University of Trnava. Her husband is Blažej Baláž, Slovak painter.

Immediately at the beginning, Mária Balážová, created her own „personal mythology“, emphasizing a snake motif in the geometrically stylised form of a cobra. This animal, which occupies an important position in world mythologies and religions, became the main motif of cycles of paintings, to which the artist gave the name Serpent Geometry. Balážová distinguished herself from classic Neo-Constructivism, outlined on subjectless combinations of shapes and colours, put together into geometric structures. Art theorists appreciate the „new significance“ she achieved by creating radically reductive forms (Jiří Valoch, 2002). "

In her latest works, fear of violence, power and hegemony are projected in the intimate family background, where the dominant men´s element is systematically planned in the painting area and it culminates in the series of drawings and paintings called Domestic Violence. A distinctly expressive handwriting used in some places refers very straightforwardly to Balážová´s personal story and moves the general criticism of an androcentric society to a more intimate position. Here, the key role is played by the figure of a despotic father who permanently and demonically comes back in acrylic canvases and large-format drawings – destructively and aggressively . In the latest works, Mária Balážová bet on a straightforward expression of her personal story associated with a therapeutic character. This approach in her works represents a new dimension not only for her herself, but also for geometric painting in general. (Roman Gajdoš)

Her works are held in the collections of Slovak National Gallery, Bratislava, National Gallery, Prague (CZ), Wannieck Gallery Brno (CZ), Jan Koniarek Gallery, Trnava.

The artist has been a member of the revived Club of Concrete Artists 2 and the artist's group East of Eden. She lives and works in Trnava.

== Awards ==
- 1990 Honorable Mention, Drawing 1990, Provo (USA)
- 1995 Prize of Masaryk's Academy, Prague (CZ)
- 2019 Honorary Mention Award, International Drawing Biennale India 2018-19, New Delhi (India)

== Works ==
- Archetyp (1988) : Collection of Slovak National Gallery, Bratislava
- Pose VII (1989)
- Rocket Man 1 (1989)
- Lexicon 1 (1990)
- Flowing 6 (1993) : Collection of Jan Koniarek Gallery, Trnava
- Serpent Geometry 2 (1994) : Collection of Jan Koniarek Gallery, Trnava
- Serpent Geometry 3 (1994)
- Serpent Geometry 5 (1996)
- Serpent Geometry 15 – Church (1998)
- Serpent Geometry 33 – Fatum (2000/01)
- Serpent Geometry 40 – Alphabet 3 (2002) : Collection of National Gallery, Prague
- Serpent Geometry 43 (2004)
- Serpent Geometry 49 - Portrait (2005/06) : Collection of Wannieck Gallery Brno
- Serpent Geometry – Shoot (2005)
- Serpent Geometry 70 – History (2005/07)
- Chaos 1 (2006/09)
- Domestic Violence 5 (2019)
- Domestic Violence 6 (2019)
- Domestic Violence 8 (2019)

== Books and Catalogues ==
- BALGAVÁ, B. - ORAVCOVÁ, J. - VALOCH, J. 1997. Mária Balážová. Trnava : Ján Koniarek Gallery, 32 p.
- VALOCH, J. 2002. Mária Balážová / Serpent Geometry 1997-2002. Trnava : Trnava University, 12 p.
- BESKID, V. - VALOCH, J. - GAJDOŠ, R. 2009. Mária Balážová / 1985-2009. Trnava : Typi Universitatis Tyrnaviensis, (English – Slovak, colour), 111 p. ISBN 978-80-8082-265-1
