= Church of Saint Matthew of Zolná =

Roman Catholic church in Zvolen, Slovakia

- Rímskokatolícky kostol sv. Matúša
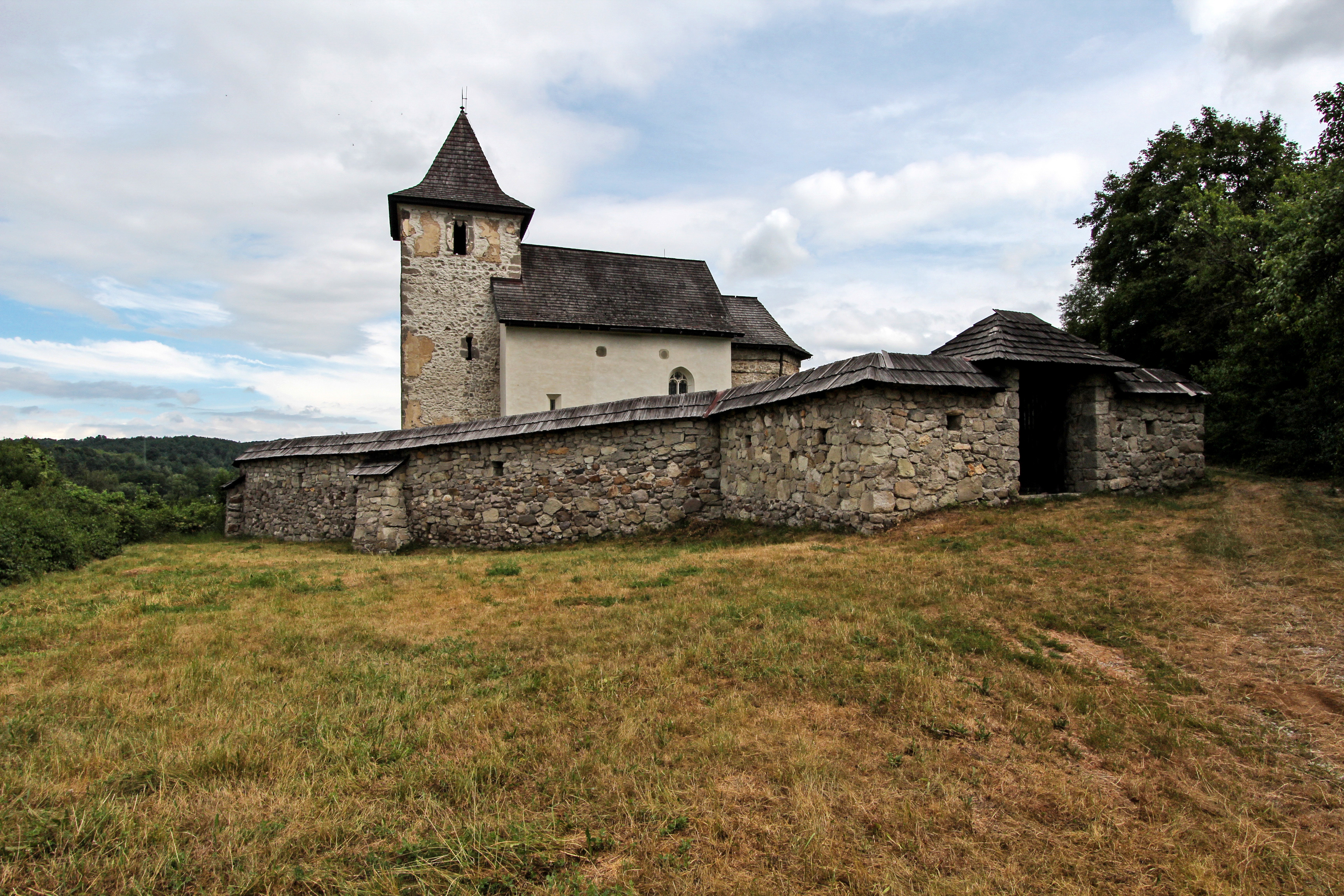
- Church of Saint Matthew of Zolná

- Location within Slovakia

Religion
- Affiliation: Catholic Church in Slovakia
- District: Zvolen
- Region: Banská Bystrica
- Leadership: Roman Catholic Diocese of Banská Bystrica
- Year consecrated: around 1280

Location
- Location: Zvolen
- Country: Slovakia
- Interactive map of Church of Saint Matthew of Zolná
- Coordinates: 48.602005°N 19.224884°E

Architecture
- Type: Church

Church of Saint Matthew of Zolná is a Roman Catholic church situated in the suburb of Zolná in the city of Zvolen.

== History ==
According to the historic, handwritten document by the archbishop Thomas of Esztergom from 1311, Bychor and Zubrata, the sons of the head of Zólyom County, obtained the permission to build a fortified church with a cemetery in the village. The preservation of such a document is a rare occasion in present-day Slovakia. The church, however, is probably older than indicated by this document and was before consecrated to Saint Stephen. The building dates back to around 1280.

In 2000, Charles, Prince of Wales visited the church and recognized the modest beauty of the small church.
