= Rozália Danková =

Slovak Roman Catholic nun (1920–2017)

- Born: 26 April 1920; Svätý Kríž nad Hronom, Czechoslovakia
- Died: 14 August 2017 (aged 97); Nitra, Slovakia

Rozália Danková (26 April 1920 – 14 August 2017), also known as Sister Stela, was a Catholic nun, member of the Daughters of Charity of Saint Vincent de Paul and writer, known for documenting prosecution of Christians in communist Czechoslovakia.

== Biography ==
=== Early life ===
Rozália Danková, was born on 26 April 1920 in Svätý Kríž nad Hronom. Her father was disabled as a result of injury suffered in World War I so her mother was responsible for running the household as well as the family textile shop. She was the third child of her parents. Following high school graduation, at the age of 19, she became a novice at the Daughters of Charity convent in Ladce. As a nun, she took the name Stella. Along with her fellow nuns she worked as a nurse during the World War II.

=== Persecution by the Communist Regime ===
Following the 1948 Czechoslovak coup d'état, the Communist government concentrated over 300 nuns from different orders at the Ladce convent under the surveillance of the ŠtB. Danková worked at the hospital in Trenčín until 1955, when the regime forbid members of religious orders from working in healthcare. Afterwards he worked in a nursing home in Čechy. Danková's continued participation in monastic life led to persecution by the authorities. In 1958, she was arrested with three fellow sisters and sentenced to two and a half years in prison for "subverting the republic".

After her release from prison in 1960, she was not allowed to return home. Instead she was sent to work the village of Bílá Voda. During this time, she was able to complete training as a nurse to be able to better take care of aging nuns. During the Prague Spring, the persecution of Christians in Czechoslovakia eased and Danková was able to travel to Paris, where she worked at the headquarters of her order. Danková return to Czechoslovakia in 1977. After her return, she worked at a nursing home in Přelouč. In 1983, she was repeatedly arrested but not sentenced of any crime. Instead, the authorities ordered the entire order of Daughters of Charity to Bíla Voda. There, the nuns were tasked by the Church with production of sacramental bread for the entire Czechoslovakia. Danková was able to launch the production with the financial support from the Kirche in Not. The German organization refused to donate to the Communist regime and so the machinery was personally owned by Danková.

=== Late years ===
Following the Velvet Revolution, Danková placed the sacramental bread production under the management of the Roman Catholic Archdiocese of Olomouc and returned to Slovakia. There she taught at a nursing school in Nitra. After her retirement, she continued teaching French at the local seminary until 2013. Heeding the call of the Pope John Paul II to document the persecution of the Church by the Communists, she co-authored two books documenting the persecution of Catholics in Czechoslovakia.

== Death ==
Rozália Stela Danková died on 14 August 2017 at the age of 97. Her funeral mass was celebrated by the Bishop of Nitra Viliam Judák on 19 August. She was buried at the Municipal cemetery in Nitra
