= Nevoľné =

Municipality in Slovakia

Nevoľné Tormáskert
- Municipality
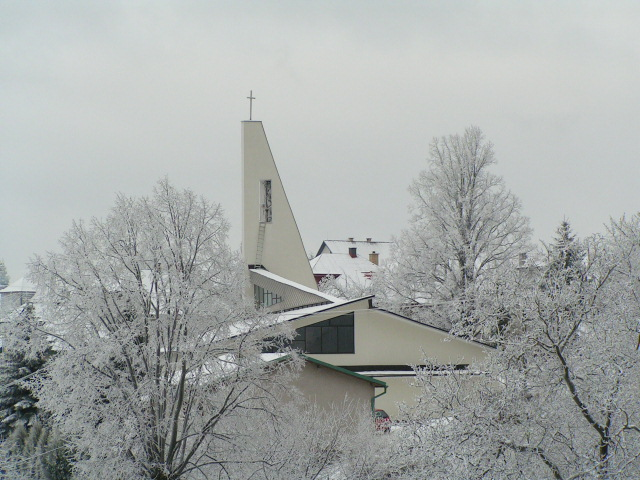
- Church in Nevoľné

- Flag

- Location of Nevoľné in the Banská Bystrica Region Location of Nevoľné in Slovakia
- Coordinates: 48.67°N 18.95°E
- Country: Slovakia
- Region: Banská Bystrica Region
- District: Žiar nad Hronom District
- First mentioned: 1571

Area
  - Total: 3.10 km^{2} (1.20 sq mi)
- Elevation: 691 m (2,267 ft)

Population (2025)
  - Total: 387
- Time zone: UTC+1 (CET)
  - Summer (DST): UTC+2 (CEST)
- Postal code: 967 01
- Area code: +421 45
- Vehicle registration plate (until 2022): ZH
- Website: www.nevolne.sk

Nevoľné (Hungarian: Tormáskert) is a village and municipality in Žiar nad Hronom District in the Banská Bystrica Region of central Slovakia, 6 kilometres from Kremnica town. The village is mentioned first in archive documents in 1487.

== Geography ==
The municipality lies at an altitude of 691 metres (2,267 ft) and covers an area of 3.10 km^{2} (1.20 sq mi) (2025).

== Population ==
Population statistic (10 years)
Year	1995	2005	2015	2025
Count	430	423	409	387
Difference		−1.62%	−3.30%	−5.37%

Population statistic
Year	2024	2025
Count	390	387
Difference		−0.76%

It has a population of 387 people (31 December 2025).

=== Ethnicity ===
Census 2021 (1+ %)
Ethnicity	Number	Fraction
Slovak	399	98.51%
Total	405	

In year 2021 was 405 people by ethnicity 399 as Slovak, 3 as Czech, 3 as Not found out, 2 as German, 1 as Romani, 1 as Polish and 1 as Other.

Note on population: The difference values of population numbers in the table "Population statistic" and in the sections "Ethnicity" & "Religion" is caused by the use of various statistical methods.

=== Religion ===
Census 2021 (1+ %)
Religion	Number	Fraction
Roman Catholic Church	342	84.44%
None	51	12.59%
Total	405	

In year 2021 was 405 people by religion 342 from Roman Catholic Church, 51 from None, 3 from Not found out, 2 from Other, 2 from Evangelical Church, 2 from Ad hoc movements, 1 from Other and not ascertained christian church, 1 from Greek Catholic Church and 1 from Buddhism.

== Notable people ==
- Blažej Baláž, artist
- Rudolf Baláž, Roman Catholic bishop
