= Šášovské Podhradie =

Coordinates: 48°34′32″N 18°53′56″E

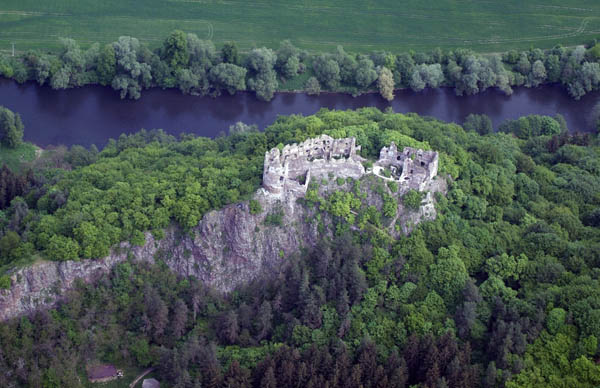
Šášov Castle

Šášovské Podhradie (Hungarian: Saskőváralja) is a neighbourhood and a municipal borough of Žiar nad Hronom, located some 5 km southeast of the city center.

== Location ==
Šášovské Podhradie lies in the northern valleys of Štiavnica Mountains, on the left bank of Hron, near the confluence with Istebný potok brook at an altitude of 270 meters. It also includes outposts of Bukovinka and Srnosiete.

== History ==
The settlement is first mentioned in 1363 as a place of processing of oak bark for tanners from Liptov. Šášov Castle towers on the rocks above the settlement. The Castle is first mentioned in 1253 and is recorded as a royal castle since 1330. It served to protect the commercial routes near the important crossroads at Žiar nad Hronom, along the Hron. It was devastated in 1667 and deserted since the 18th century. In the 21st century, the castle is renovated by a local civic association and volunteers.

Šášovské Podhradie is a part of the city of Žiar nad Hronom since 1971.

== Transport ==
Intra-city bus line number 4 connects Šášovské Podhradie with the rest of the city. The neighbourhood is also easily accessible via Road I/65. It is also a junction of hiking trails to Podhorie, Ladomerská Vieska and Hronská Breznica.
