= Peter Antal =

Slovak politician (born 1972)

Member of the National Council
- In office 23 March 2016 – 20 March 2020

Personal details
- Born: 11 August 1972 (age 54) Žiar nad Hronom, Czechoslovakia
- Party: Most–Híd
- Education: Comenius University in Bratislava

Peter Antal (born 11 July 1972) is a Slovak lawyer, politician, former businessman and manager. Since 2014, he has been the mayor of Žiar nad Hronom, and from 2016 to 2020, he served as a member of the National Council of the Slovak Republic for the MOST – HÍD party.

== Biography ==
Antal was born in Žiar nad Hronom. In 1986-1990 he graduated in Fire Protection at the Secondary Industrial School of Construction in Žilina; in 1990–1996, he graduated in Law at the Faculty of Law of Comenius University in Bratislava. From 1996 to 1998, he worked as a trainee lawyer in the law office of JUDr. Richard Schin in Bratislava, then from 1998 to 2003, he worked in the company Poľnonákup SLATINA a.s., first as a lawyer and organisational and legal deputy director (1998-2001), then as a director (2001-2003) and from 10 March 2000 to 20 May 2004 as vice-chairman of the board of directors.

From 2001 to 2010, he was engaged in business activities. From 5 May 2003 to 31 December 2009, he was engaged in business within the framework of a trade licence in the field of organisational, economic and business consultancy. He was also a partner and managing director of several companies.

In the 2014 Slovak local elections, he received 4,253 valid votes as an independent candidate for mayor of the town of Žiara nad Hronom, and won against the Slovak Conservative Party candidate Miroslav Grznár (411 votes) and the People's Party Our Slovakia candidate Radovan Jakúbek (199 votes).

He defended his position as mayor in the 2018 Slovak local elections, when he ran with the support of MOST – HÍD, Direction – Slovak Social Democracy and the Slovak National Party, and won 3 456 valid votes (76.98%), which is 2 423 votes more than his opponent Mariana Páleníková.

In the 2016 Slovak parliamentary election, he received 2,825 preferential votes, which placed him 17th among the party's candidates (he was number 16 on the candidate list).

In the National Council of the Slovak Republic, he served as the chairman of the Committee on Agriculture and Environment, a member of the Special Control Committee to control the activities of the National Security Office, and a substitute member of the permanent delegation to the Parliamentary Assembly of the Organization for Security and Cooperation in Europe.
