= Blažej Baláž =

Slovak artist

- Born: 29 October 1958 (age 67); Nevoľné, Czechoslovakia
- Education: Academy of Fine Arts and Design in Bratislava
- Known for: Painting, Drawing, Media painting, Printmaking, Objet d'art, Performance, Event
- Movement: Neo-conceptual art, Political art, Environmental art and Activism

Blažej Baláž (born 29 October 1958) is a Slovak contemporary artist. His practise as an artist is usually associated with political art, environmental, activist, mail-art and neo-conceptualism. After 1988 he began working with text as art, neo-conceptual and post-conceptual texts (intext, outtext).

== Life and work ==
Baláž was born in Nevoľné, Czechoslovakia (today Slovakia). He studied at the Academy of Fine Arts, Bratislava, and his Magister of Fine Arts degree received in 1983. Baláž has been the Head of Department of Fine Arts Education at the University of Trnava since 1999. He was a founder member of the artists group East of Eden (1998). Since 1979, he has been married to the artist Mária Balážová.

He lives and works in Trnava.

He has worked in the areas of political, environmental, activist and neo-conceptual art. His practice also comprises media painting, works on paper, performances, drawing, object, mail art and printmaking.

He has shown work internationally in exhibitions including the Drawing 1990, Provo, USA (1990), Vth International Drawing Triennale, Wrocław (1992), 12th International Biennale of Small Sculpture, Murska Sobota (1995), International Biennale of Graphic Arts, Ljubljana (1989, 1995, 1999), Object / Object. Prague, Czech Museum of Fine Arts (2001), Intertext / From the conceptual to postconceptual text, Ján Koniarek Gallery, Trnava (2009), Formats of Transformation 89 – 09 / Seven views on the new Czech and Slovak identity, House of Art, Brno (2009).

Solo exhibitions (retrospective): Geld macht Kunst, Ján Koniarek Gallery, Trnava (2003), Blažej Baláž Texts 1988/2007, The East Slovak Gallery, Košice (2007), Museum of Fine Arts, Žilina (2007), SUCHARATOLEST House of Art, Bratislava (2009), WARTEZEIT, Slowakisches Institut Wien (2009), Post-Geo-Text (with Mária Balážová), Slowakisches Institut Berlin (2011).

His works are held in the public collections of Slovak National Gallery, Bratislava, National Gallery in Prague (CZ), Muzeum Archidiecezjalne, Katowice (PL), Fries Museum, Leeuwarden (NL), Jan Koniarek Gallery, Trnava, East Slovak Gallery Košice, City Gallery, Bratislava, Central Slovak Gallery, Banská Bystrica.

== Cycle Treptomachia ==
Baláž's works brings the new possibilities at the field of post-conceptual and neo-conceptual text. The exhibition is divided in three segments, all of them are connected by the specific and authentic search of the possibilities in the conceptual Macaronic language.

The first is created from the neo-conceptual horizontal/vertical texts, a part of Treptomachia, (WARTEZEIT, 2006, WARTERAUM, 2006 and How to domesticate the English language, 2006). The internal orientation of artworks, the search of art itself, the search of language and text brings the cracking of syntactic/semantic wholeness of graphems. The metatexts of initial prototext are distinguished by the colors (oil on canvas, 300 x 200 cm).

In this regard Baláž's eff ort culminates by the diptych TREPTOMACHIA.EN-A / How to domesticate the English language and TREPTOMACHIA.DE-B / How to domesticate the German language (2006). Both are depicted on big-size canvas, within which the only dominating word with partial messages is replaced with newly defined optical language with tens of words. The colour decomposition of the grapheme creates a symptomatic background for language overlapping and the contamination, which creates the supreme moment of the author's Babylonian crossroads.

Another, the second segment, black and white acryl-paintings enriches the former one, the artworks are created on principle of the structuralist analysis of text. It is a variant, which is called and named by author and curator the intext. By the segmentation of text the author discovers several lexis. These have a different lexical origin, five West-European, five East-European, and „dead“ language of Medieval Esperanto – Latin. Despite the cold artificiality of works, this segment has also the hidden sociocritical context, which is oscillated between phenomenons West and East, art and politics.

The third segment is the most open and subjective. These horizontal texts are named by its author as the simultaneous texts. It is a different alternative in the post-conceptual Makaronian text, the melange is created by harmony of the initial and derivative text. Its ironic and attacking character replaces a cold aspect of the first two segments. Vajanský's Suchá ratolesť (an ironic parallel of failing elits) is floundered by streams, the subject is named by the author as east rat in the age of 20-years of wandering a la democrazy, with a more complicated ambivalent reading. The fragility of ground – paper [four artworks, width 10 m] raises the openness of statement, ODRBMADEMOKRATICKY, 2008 [screw me over democratically], is predominative.

== Awards ==
- 1987 Honorable Mention, Biennale of Slovak Graphic Art IX, Banská Bystrica
- 1987 3rd Prize for Printmaking, Competition of Slovak Fine Artists, Bratislava
- 1989 Purchase Prize, 9è Mini Print Internacional, Cadaqués (E)
- 1989 1st Prize for Painting, Competition of West-Slovak Fine Artists, Trenčín
- 1990 Award of Excellence, 6th International Miniature Print Biennale, Seoul (South Korea)
- 1995 Award of The Masaryk's Academy of Arts, Prague (CZ)
- 1996 Prize Ex Aequo, Biennale of Slovak Graphic Art XIII, Banská Bystrica
- 2005 The Jury's Award, Biennale of small graphics GRAFIX, Břeclav (CZ)
- 2005 Award of The City Banská Bystrica, Triennial of Slovak Graphic Art XVI, Banská Bystrica
- 2008 Award of The City Trnava
- 2014 Prize of the Czech Union of Visual Artists of the Czech Republic, 9th International Biennial of Drawing Plzeň (CZ)
- 2016 Special Award by the Jury - Osten Biennial of Drawing 2016, Skopje (MK)

== Collections ==
- Slovak National Gallery, Bratislava
- Galéria mesta Bratislavy, Bratislava
- East-Slovak Gallery, Košice
- Central Slovak Gallery, Banská Bystrica
- J. Koniarek Gallery, Trnava
- M. A. Bazovský Gallery, Trenčín
- National Gallery, Prague (CZ)
- Moravská galerie, Brno (CZ)
- Osten Museum of Drawing, Skopje (MK)
- Muzeum Archidiecezjalne, Katowice (PL)
- Miejska Galeria Sztuki, Łódź (PL)
- Cremona Civic Museum, Prints Cabinet (I)
- Friske Museum, Leeuwarden (N)

== Books, catalogues ==
- VALOCH, J. – VARTECKÁ, A. 2003. Blažej Baláž. Trnava : Trnava University, East of Eden, 132 p. (In English and Slovak) ISBN 80-89074-22-7
- BESKID, V. – GAJDOŠ, R. 2007. Blažej Baláž : Texts 1988 /2007. Trnava : East of Eden, Trnava University, 48 p. (In English and Slovak) ISBN 978-80-8082-129-6
- BALÁŽ, B. 2009. The Texts of the Texts. Trnava : Trnava University, 30 p. ISBN 978-80-8082-314-6
- ORIŠKOVÁ, M. – GAJDOŠ, R. – BALÁŽ, B. 2016. Blažej Baláž – My Way. Trnava : Typi Universitatis Tyrnaviensis, 202 p. ISBN 978-80-8082-992-6
