= Štefan Moyses =

Slovak bishop and politician (1797–1869)

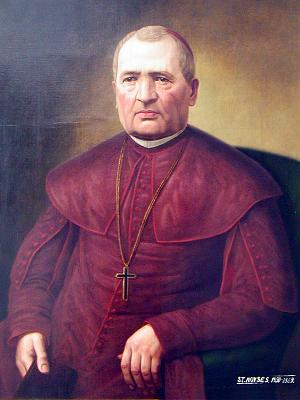
- Portrait by Jozef Božetech Klemens
- Born: October 24, 1797; Veszele (Veselé), Kingdom of Hungary (now Slovakia)
- Died: July 5, 1869 (aged 71); Garamszentkereszt (Žiar nad Hronom), Austria-Hungary (now Slovakia)
- Other names: Štefan Moyzes, Moyzes István

Štefan Moyses (also as Štefan Moyzes, Hungarian: Moyzes István; October 24, 1797 in Veszele (today Veselé) – July 5, 1869 in Garamszentkereszt (now Žiar nad Hronom)) was a Slovak prelate who served as the 6th Bishop of Besztercebánya (now Banská Bystrica), teacher, patriot, co-founder and first Chairman of Matica slovenská.

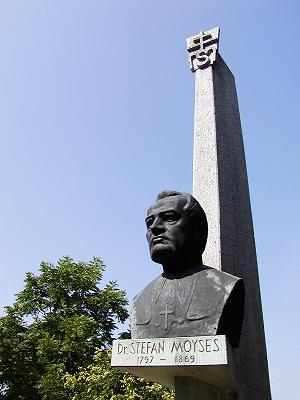
Memorial in Veselé

== Biography ==
Štefan Moyses was ordained a priest in 1821. He served as chaplain in several parishes of the archdiocese of Esztergom, later worked in Croatia. In January 1830 he became professor of Zagreb Academy. In 1847 he was appointed a canon of Zagreb chapter and was elected member of Diet of the Kingdom of Hungary. He was supporter of Ľudovít Štúr proposals put forward by the Diet of the Kingdom of Hungary in 1848, the re-introduction of mother tongue in primary education and in worship. In 1850 he was appointed the 6th Bishop of Besztercebánya. He was the head of the Slovak delegation that arrived at the imperial court of Emperor Franz Joseph I on 12 December 1861 to submit Memorandum národa slovenského (Memorandum of the Slovak nation) and Prosbopis Slovákov to the Emperor. On 3 August 1863 he became the first Chairman of Matica slovenská. He was granted the permission from Holy See to celebrate 5 July as the Feast day of Sts. Cyril and Methodius.
