= Rudolf Baláž =

Slovak Roman Catholic prelate (1940–2011)

His Excellency Rudolf Baláž
- Bishop of Banská Bystrica
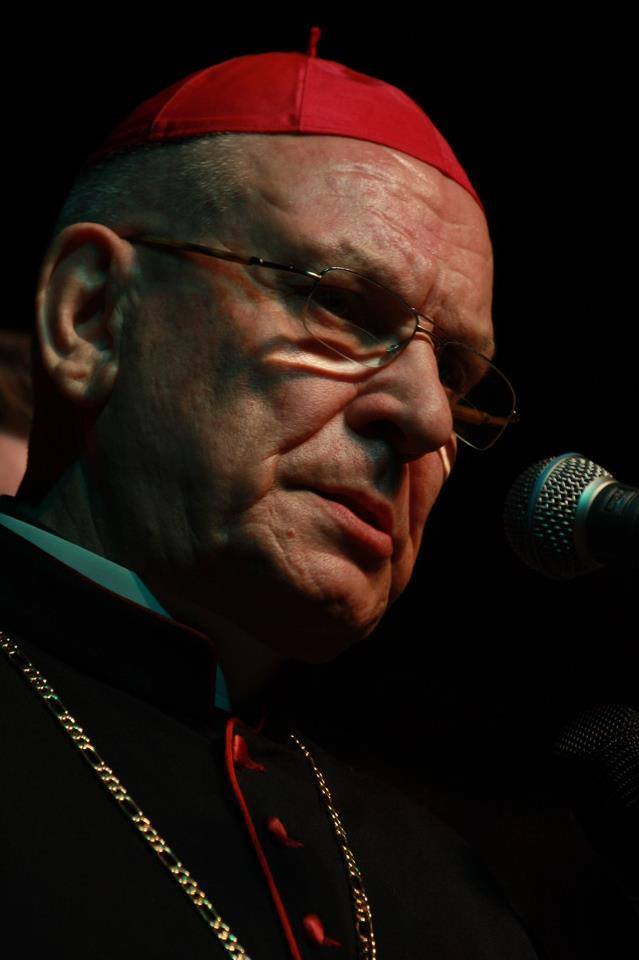
- Church: Roman Catholic
- Appointed: 14 February 1990
- Term ended: 27 July 2011
- Predecessor: Jozef Feranec
- Successor: Marián Chovanec

Orders
- Ordination: 23 June 1963 by Ambróz Lazík
- Consecration: 19 March 1990 by Jozef Tomko

Personal details
- Born: 20 November 1940 Nevoľné, Slovakia
- Died: 27 July 2011 (aged 70) Banská Bystrica, Slovakia
- Education: Comenius University
- Motto: Veritas liberabit vos (Latin for 'Truth will set you free')
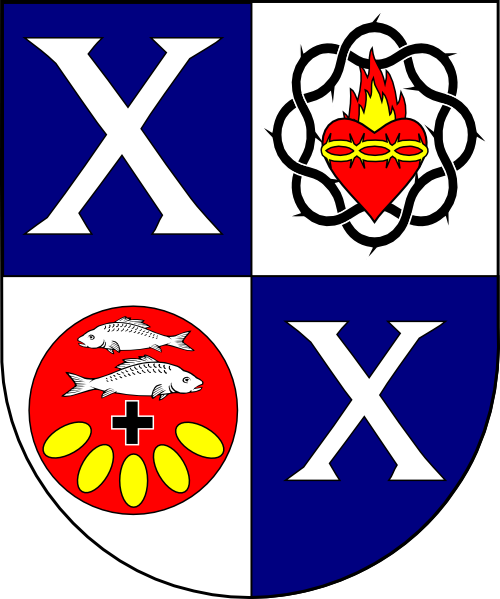
- Coat of arms

Rudolf Baláž (20 November 1940 in Nevoľné – 27 July 2011 in Banská Bystrica) was a Slovak Bishop of the Roman Catholic Diocese of Banská Bystrica from 1990 until his death in 2011. Baláž was ordained as a Catholic priest on 23 June 1963. He died on 27 July 2011 at the age of 70.

== Biography ==
=== Early life and priesthood ===
Rudolf Baláž was born on 20 November 1940 in the village of Nevoľné, nearby Kremnica. He was the youngest of six children. Baláž was raised only by his mother because father died shortly before he was born. He was educated at the elementary school in Nevoľné and gymnasium in Kremnica. Between 1958 and 1963 he studied theology at the Comenius University. He was ordained priest on 23 June 1963 at the St Martin's Cathedral in Bratislava and served as a chaplain in Brezno (1963–1964), Krupina (1965–1966) and Vrútky (1967). In December 1967, he was appointed parish priest in Vrícko.

Immediately after his ordination, Baláž became a target of the communist regime in Czechoslovakia due to his independence, his appeal among young people, and his refusal to cooperate with state authorities. After participating in the 1966 millennium celebrations of the Polish Church, he was subjected to intensive surveillance and interrogation by the State Security. In 1971 he was stripped of his state permission to serve publicly as a priest and was forced to work for more than a decade as a laborer, tractor driver, and truck driver. During this period he remained active in the clandestine pastoral network, organizing retreats, producing religious materials, and maintaining contact with figures of the underground Church, including Cardinal Ján Korec.

=== Bishop ===
Following the political thaw of the 1980s, Baláž returned to official ministry and became an important link between the legal and underground Church. In March 1990 Pope John Paul II appointed him Bishop of Banská Bystrica. As a Bishop, Baláž reorganized diocesan structures, supported the development of Catholic media and educational institutions, and defended ecclesial independence from political influence. During the 1990s he became one of the few high-ranking Church leaders in Slovakia to openly criticize the authoritarian tendencies of Vladimír Mečiar. His public interventions, including speeches at civic demonstrations, positioned him as a significant moral authority in the emerging public sphere.

Baláž was also the target of political pressure and intelligence operations, most notably the 1995 “triptych affair,” in which the Slovak Information Service attempted to implicate him in an alleged illegal art sale. The subsequent unauthorized police search of the diocesan offices provoked national and international criticism and was widely interpreted as an effort to intimidate the Church. Despite persecution by the state, Balaž played a key role in establishing institutions such as Rádio Lumen, TV Lux, the Catholic University in Ružomberok, and the Saint Agatha Breast Cancer Center.
