= SNP Square (Banská Bystrica) =

Square in Banská Bystrica, Slovakia

Coordinates: 48.7353°N 19.1452°E

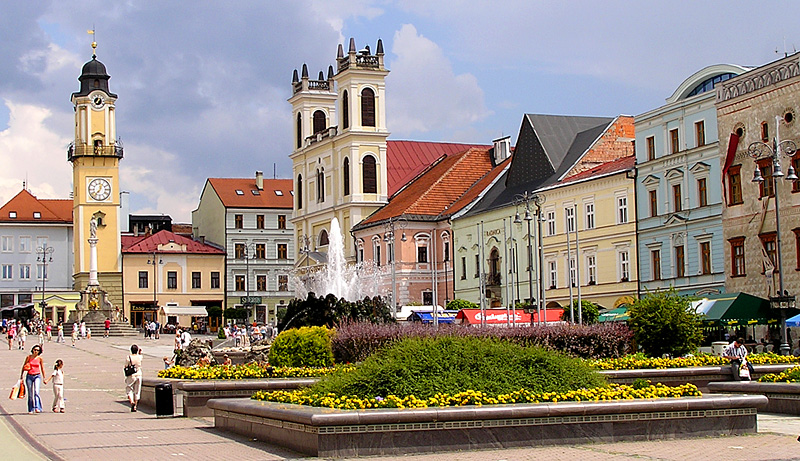
The Slovak National Uprising Square

Slovak National Uprising Square (Námestie Slovenského národného povstania), or SNP Square (Námestie SNP) is an area in central Banská Bystrica, Slovakia, named after the insurgency of 1944. It has been the hub of the city's life and a prestigious address for more than 600 years. During the 20th century, the square saw periodic mass gatherings celebrating first national independence, then the defeat of the uprising after which it is now named, and finally the memory of the event. Dotted by cafés, restaurants, and small stores, it is a popular place for the locals to linger, and a tourist attraction notable for its historical buildings, and visual appeal. The whole square is a free public WiFi hotspot.

== History ==
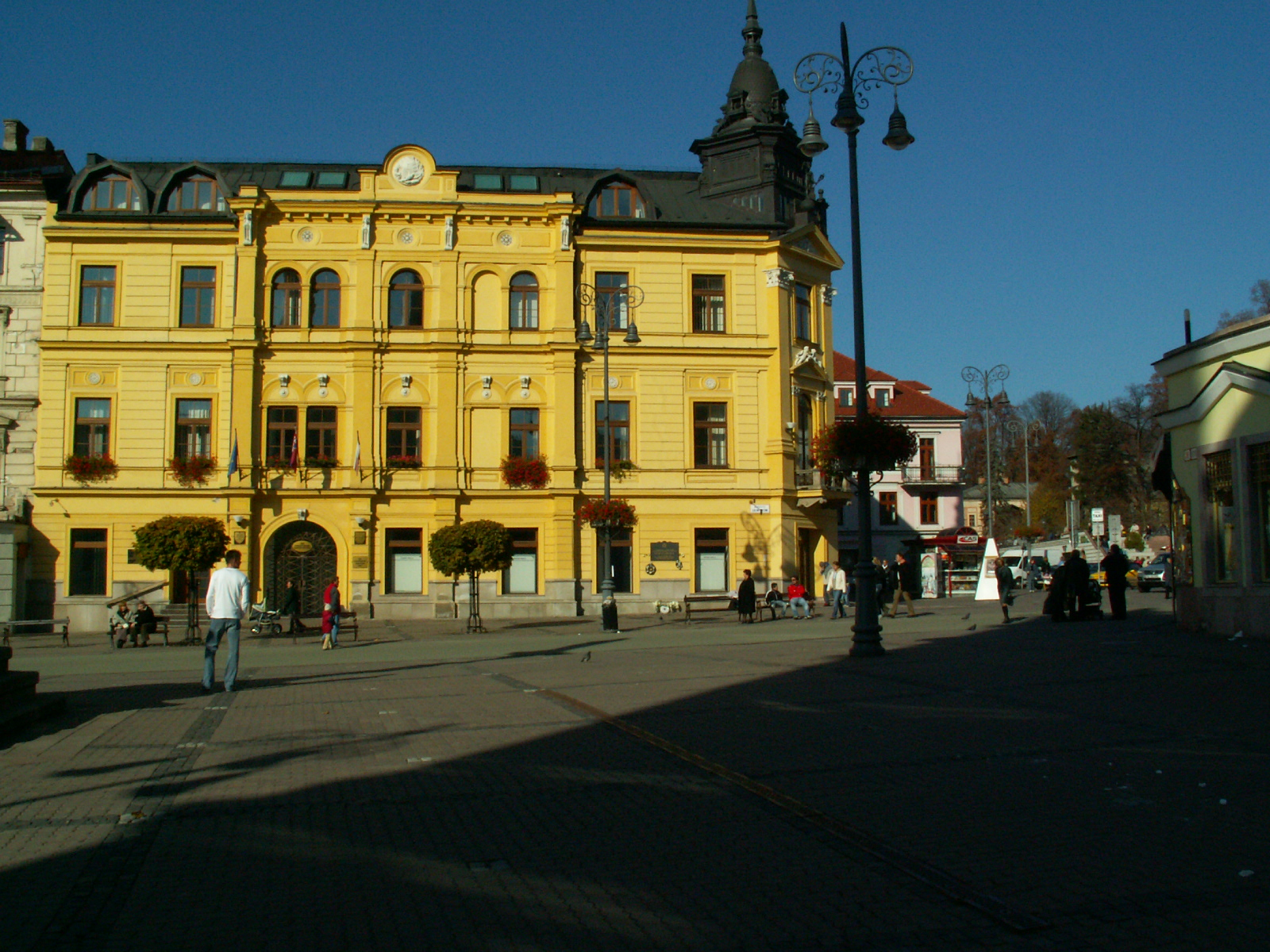
Ebner House, seat of the self-governing region

=== The Square ===
The central area surrounded by merchants' and businessmen's homes was known as the (town) "Square," Ring in German (literally: "circle," a word used in the sense of "a marketplace" in the past) and Rínok in Slovak, for centuries. After Banská Bystrica was granted its Royal Charter in the 13th century, the "Square burghers" (Ringbürger in German, circulari in Latin) with residences at the Square attained special privileges among the citizens of the royal free town (a self-governing municipality outside the county jurisdiction − directly under the monarch and with its own representation in the Diet). The word Ringbürger remained an honorific, "Esteemed Citizen," in Banská Bystrica through the 19th century.

=== Main Square, and King Béla IV Square ===
When new town squares developed elsewhere in Banská Bystrica, the central one came to be called "Main Square" (Slovak: Hlavné námestie; the town had a Slovak majority, a German minority, with a scattering of Hungarians by the end of the 18th century). Budapest formalized the name in its Hungarian version (Fő tér) in the 1860s as part of a drive to assign Hungarian names to all the country's localities, and emphasized history in 1886 by renaming it "King Béla IV Square" (Hungarian: IV. Béla király tér, Slovak: Námestie kráľa Bela IV.) after the monarch who granted Banská Bystrica its Royal Charter in 1255.

=== Masaryk Square ===
The name of the central square remained the politicians' target in the 20th century. By 1923 it had already been renamed "Masaryk Square" (Masarykovo námestie) after the country's first president Tomáš Masaryk, shortly after Czecho-Slovakia (soon unhyphenated as Czechoslovakia) was created in 1918. The square saw a massive gathering to celebrate the new statehood during President Masaryk's visit in 1923. Banská Bystrica became the administrative center of the Central Slovak District, which enhanced the role of the square in the social, economic, and political life of the region.

=== Andrej Hlinka Square ===
A month after Slovakia acquired autonomy in October 1938, the square was renamed "Andrej Hlinka Square" (Námestie Andreja Hlinku) after the leader of the largest party with autonomy in its program. On 29 August 1944, Banská Bystrica became the center of the Slovak National Uprising against the country's totalitarian government and its alliance with Germany, the most extensive revolt in Western and Central Europe during World War II. The square became an assembly area for the insurgency. After the suppression of the uprising, President Jozef Tiso arrived at the square in October 1944 for an approbatory ceremony to decorate German soldiers who defeated the Slovak insurgents.

=== SNP Square ===
When Slovakia was reincorporated in a truncated Czechoslovakia in 1945, the square was first renamed "National Uprising Square" (Námestie Národného povstania), and eventually "Slovak National Uprising Square" (Námestie Slovenského národného povstania). The name has remained unchanged through the present. The square was the site of massive commemorations of the event staged by the Communist authorities once every five years for much of their rule.

An early event during the Velvet Revolution was a student demonstration at SNP Square on 21 November 1989, part of the popular movement that brought about the downfall of communism.

== Buildings ==
The square is dominated by a clock tower built in 1552. Although less known than its famous counterpart in Pisa, it is a leaning tower with the top 40 centimeters (16 in.) off the perpendicular. It hosts the main antenna that makes all of SNP Square a free WiFi hotspot provided by the city. A plague column (Slovak: Morový stĺp) was erected in the square in the 18th century in gratitude to the Virgin Mary for ending a deadly plague. The column was temporarily removed before a visit of the Soviet leader Nikita Khrushchev in 1964 because a religious symbol was considered too embarrassing a background for the Communist leader's speech. The St. Francis Xavier Cathedral (Slovak: Kapitulský kostol, "Chapter Church") is a copy of the Jesuit Church of the Gesu in Rome and has been the seat of the Roman Catholic Diocese of Banská Bystrica since 1776. Thurzo House hosts the historical exposition of the Museum of Central Slovakia (Slovak: Stredoslovenské múzeum), the oldest museum in the city. Other major monuments on the square include an Art Nouveau fountain from the beginning of the 20th century and a black obelisk raised to the honor of the Soviet soldiers killed during the liberation of the city in 1945.
