= Vrútky =

- Municipality
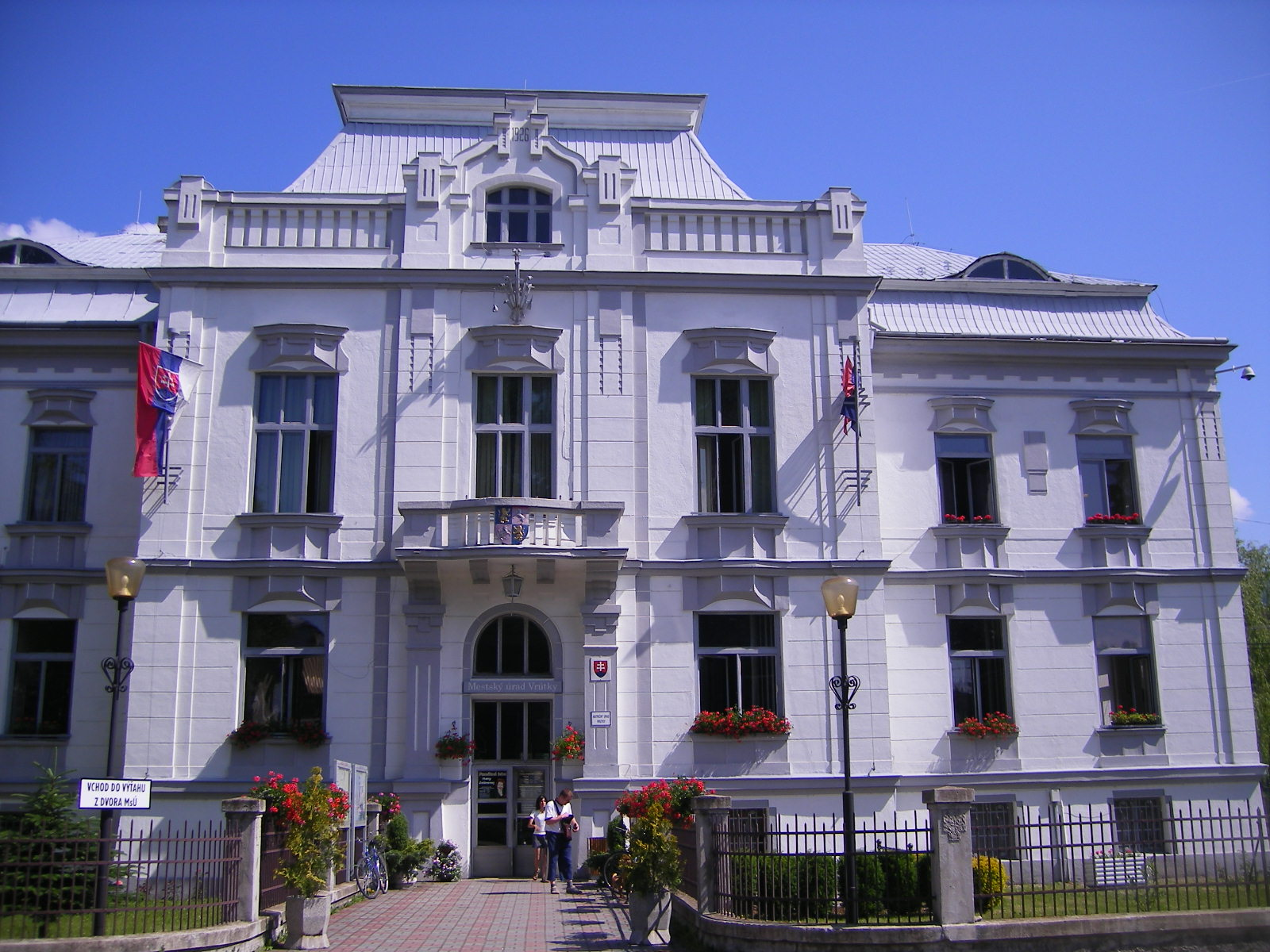
- Town hall of Vrútky

- Flag Coat of arms

- Location of Vrútky in the Žilina Region Location of Vrútky in Slovakia
- Coordinates: 49.11°N 18.92°E
- Country: Slovakia
- Region: Žilina Region
- District: Martin District
- First mentioned: 1255

Government
  - Mayor: Branislav Zacharides

Area
  - Total: 18.65 km^{2} (7.20 sq mi)
- Elevation: 381 m (1,250 ft)

Population (2025)
  - Total: 7,333
- Time zone: UTC+1 (CET)
  - Summer (DST): UTC+2 (CEST)
- Postal code: 386 1
- Area code: +421 43
- Vehicle registration plate (until 2022): MT
- Website: www.vrutky.sk

Vrútky (Slovak pronunciation: [ˈʋruːtki]; German: Ruttek (rare); Hungarian: Ruttka) is a town in northern Slovakia, close to the city of Martin. It lies in the historic Turiec region.

== Geography ==
The municipality lies at an altitude of 381 metres (1,250 ft) and covers an area of 18.65 km^{2} (7.20 sq mi) (2025).

The town lies at the confluence of Váh and the Turiec, in the Turčianska kotlina, near the Malá Fatra mountain range. It is located 3 km (2 mi) north of the city of Martin, with which it shares a public transport system, and 25 km (16 mi) from Žilina.

== Etymology ==
The name is derived from a plural form of Proto-Slavic *vьrǫ tъkъ > vrútok meaning "a hot spring".

== History ==
The town was first mentioned in 1255 as villa Vrutk. However, a settlement had previously existed, and had the old Slavic name vrutok. By the end of the 13th century, the settlement had been divided into Dolné Vrútky and Horné Vrútky. By 1332, the settlement gained independence and in 1809, the town had almost 300 inhabitants. The construction of the Košice–Bohumín Railway in 1870 and of the Hungarian State Railways line from Salgótarján in 1872 brought economic development and Vrútky gained the status of being a key railway junction. This new status was also reflected in the increased number of inhabitants, which rose from 915 in 1869, to 1,944 in 1880 and 4,345 in 1900. Before the establishment of independent Czechoslovakia in 1918, Vrútky was part of Turóc County within the Kingdom of Hungary. From 1939 to 1945, it was part of the Slovak Republic. Between the years 1949–1954 and 1971–1990 the town was amalgamated with Martin under the name Martin-Vrútky. Vrútky regained independence in the year 1990, when it separated from Martin.

== Population ==
Population statistic (10 years)
| Year | 1995 | 2005 | 2015 | 2025 |
|---|---|---|---|---|
| Count | 7350 | 7247 | 7745 | 7333 |
| Difference | | −1.40% | +6.87% | −5.31% |

Population statistic
| Year | 2024 | 2025 |
|---|---|---|
| Count | 7397 | 7333 |
| Difference | | −0.86% |

It has a population of 7333 people (31 December 2025).

=== Ethnicity ===
Census 2021 (1+%)
| Ethnicity | Number | Fraction |
|---|---|---|
| Slovak | 7052 | 93.88% |
| Not found out | 340 | 4.52% |
| Romani | 199 | 2.64% |
| Czech | 105 | 1.39% |
| Total | 7511 | |

In year 2021 was 7511 people by ethnicity 7052 as Slovak, 340 as Not found out, 199 as Romani, 105 as Czech, 21 as Hungarian, 16 as German, 12 as Rusyn, 9 as Russian, 8 as Other, 7 as Polish, 7 as English, 5 as Moravian, 3 as Ukrainian, 3 as Turkish, 3 as Italian, 3 as Croatian, 3 as Bulgarian, 2 as Jewish, 1 as Chinese, 1 as Vietnamese, 1 as Serbian and 1 as Silesian.

Note on population: The difference values of population numbers in the table "Population statistic" and in the sections "Ethnicity" & "Religion" is caused by the use of various statistical methods.

=== Religion ===
Census 2021 (1+%)
| Religion | Number | Fraction |
|---|---|---|
| None | 3152 | 41.97% |
| Roman Catholic Church | 2812 | 37.44% |
| Evangelical Church | 993 | 13.22% |
| Not found out | 312 | 4.15% |
| Total | 7511 | |

In year 2021 was 7511 people by religion 3152 from None, 2812 from Roman Catholic Church, 993 from Evangelical Church, 312 from Not found out, 39 from Other and not ascertained christian church, 30 from Ad hoc movements, 29 from Christian Congregations in Slovakia, 28 from Other, 26 from Greek Catholic Church, 13 from Eastern Orthodox Church, 13 from Jehovah's Witnesses, 11 from Apostolic Church, 10 from Seventh-day Adventist Church, 7 from United Methodist Church, 6 from Church of the Brethren, 6 from Buddhism, 5 from Paganism and natural spirituality, 5 from Islam, 3 from Calvinist Church, 3 from Hinduism, 3 from Church of Jesus Christ of Latter-day Saints, 2 from Czechoslovak Hussite Church, 2 from Baptists Church and 1 from Jewish community.

According to the 2001 census, the town has 7,298 inhabitants; 96.01% of inhabitants are Slovaks, 1.33% Czechs, 0.47% Roma and 0.33% Hungarians. This same census shows that Roman Catholics account for 50.34%, people with no religious affiliation account for 24.86% and Lutherans account for 19.01% of the total town population.

In the Slovak educational system, gymnáziums are secondary or high schools which prepare students for university study. Over 85% of students at the local four-year, co-educational Gymnázium Vrútky attend university.

== Twin towns — sister cities ==
Vrútky is twinned with:

- Bebra, Germany
- Fulnek, Czech Republic
- Łaziska Górne, Poland
- Nymburk, Czech Republic

== Notable people ==
- Ján Bodenek – writer, translator
- Emanuel Böhm – politician, writer
- Radoslav Brzobohatý – film and television actor
- John D. Hertz – founded the Yellow Cab Company
- Zora Mintalová – Zubercová – ethnographer, historian and museologist
- Hana Zelinová – prose writer and dramatist
- František Zvarík – film and theater actor
- Tomáš Galis – Bishop of Žilina
