= Jozef Feranec =

- Bishop of Banská Bystrica
- Church: Catholic Church
- Diocese: Diocese of Banská Bystrica
- In office: 19 February 1973 – 14 February 1990
- Predecessor: Andrej Škrábik
- Successor: Rudolf Baláž

Orders
- Ordination: 18 December 1932 by Marián Blaha
- Consecration: 3 March 1973 by Agostino Casaroli

Personal details
- Born: 14 March 1910 Pobedény, Nyitra County, Transleithania, Austria-Hungary
- Died: 3 May 2003 (aged 93) Banská Bystrica, Banská Bystrica Region, Slovakia
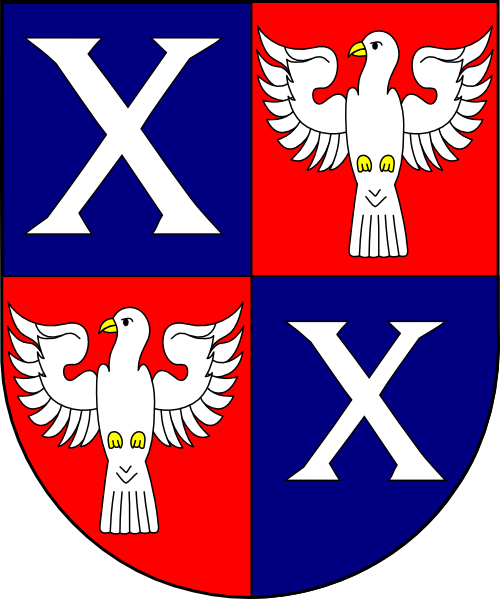
- Coat of arms

Jozef Feranec (14 March 1910 − 3 May 2003) was a Slovak Roman Catholic bishop.

Born in Pobedim, Trenčín Region on 14 March 1910 and ordained in 1932, Feranec was named bishop in February 1973. In March 1973, he was appointed bishop of the Roman Catholic Diocese of Banská Bystrica and retired in 1990.

Feranec died on 3 May 2003, aged 93, in Banská Bystrica.
