= Holy Trinity Cathedral, Žilina =

Holy Trinity Cathedral
- The Cathedral Church of the Holy Trinity
- Farský kostol
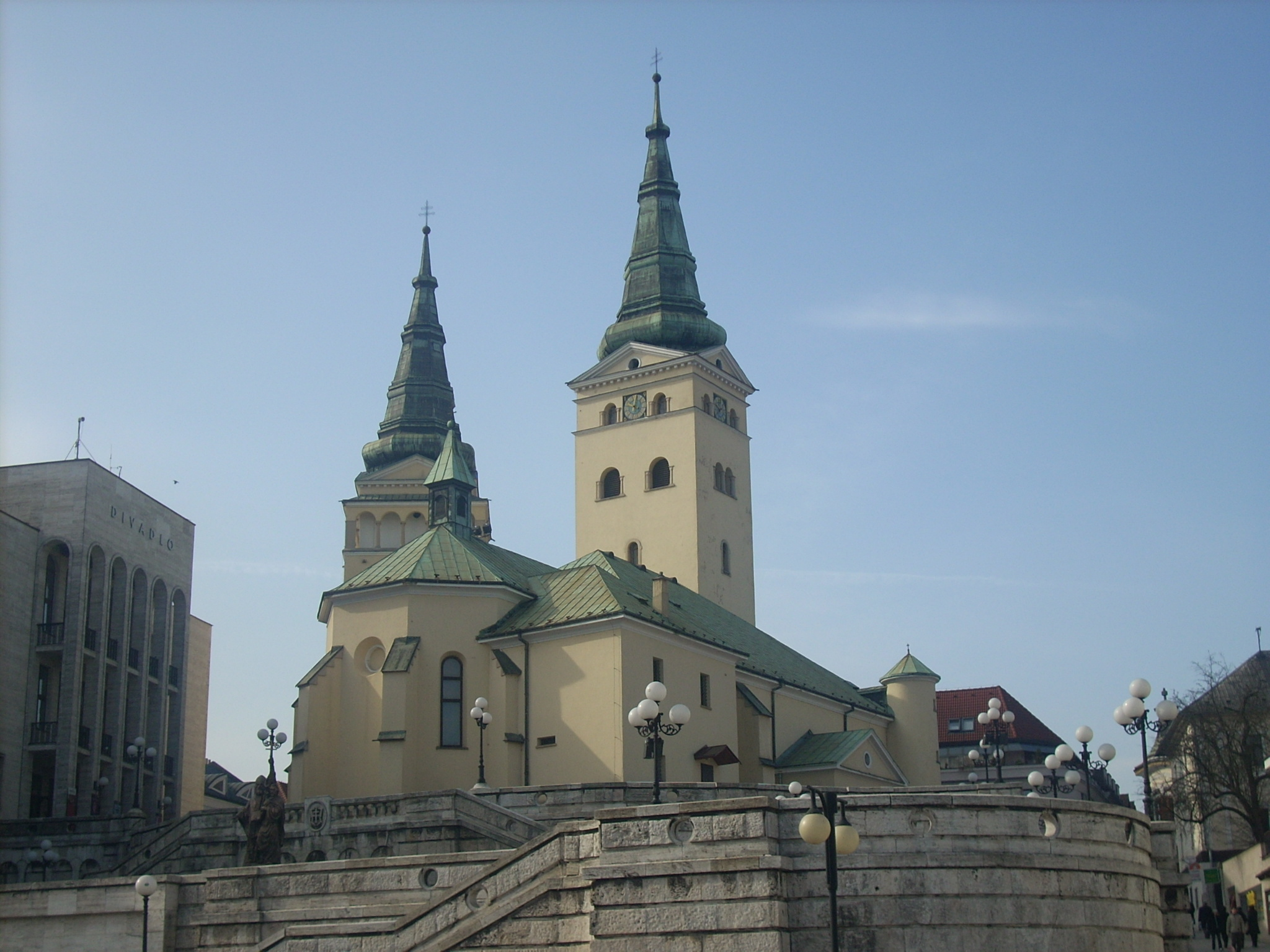
- Church of The Holy Trinity. The Burian's Tower is located on the left.
- Holy Trinity Cathedral
- 49°13′27″N 18°44′27″E
- Location: Žilina
- Country: Slovakia
- Denomination: Roman Catholic

History
- Status: Active
- Founded: 1400

Architecture
- Functional status: Cathedral and Parish Church

Administration
- Diocese: Diocese of Žilina

Clergy
- Bishop: Tomáš Galis

The Church of the Holy Trinity, since February 2008 Holy Trinity Cathedral (colloquially in Slovak Farský kostol, meaning Parish church) is a Roman Catholic church in Žilina, Slovakia. It is one of the town's most significant monuments. Together with the Burian's Tower it creates the typical skyline of the town.

== History ==
The church was built around 1400. The Žilina castle is assumed to be already there as early as the 13th century, of which there are documents from 1318 to 1454. It was originally consecrated to Mary, but in the 16th century it was reconsecrated as the Church of the Holy Trinity. The chapel of John of Nepomuk was added in 1762. The church burned down three times, in 1678, 1848 and partly in 1886. The three naves of the church were originally in Gothic style, but after a reconstruction it was styled to Renaissance style. The last major reconstruction of the church was done in 1942.

The main altarpiece in the main altar depicts the Holy Trinity, the side altars depict Immaculate Conception and the Crucifix, and near the entrance there is a picture of Saint Anne. In the compounds of the church stands separate Burian's Tower, built in the first half of the 16th century. The tower offers a good view of the preserved medieval part of the town.

Since February 2008 the church is the cathedral of the Diocese of Žilina.
