= Jozef Božetech Klemens =

Slovak painter, sculptor and inventor (1817–1883)

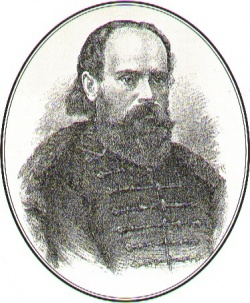
Klemens in c. 1875

Jozef Božetech Klemens (8 March 1817 – 17 January 1883) was a Slovak portrait painter, sculptor, photographer, inventor and naturalist. He chose his middle name, after an 11th-century painter and sculptor who was the last abbot of Sázava Monastery.

== Life and work ==
He was born in Liptovský Mikuláš. His father was a saddler and carriage maker from Kłodzko. His artistic talent was first displayed by painting pictures on his father's coaches. He became an assistant at a printing shop owned by Gašpar Fejérpataky-Belopotocký, a Slovak patriot and cultural figure, who used his influence to promote Klemens' education. In 1837, upon the recommendations of Karel Slavoj Amerling and Father Václav Štulc, he was admitted to the Academy of Fine Arts, Prague for a trial period. He studied there from 1838 to 1843, attending science and technology lectures as well as his art classes.

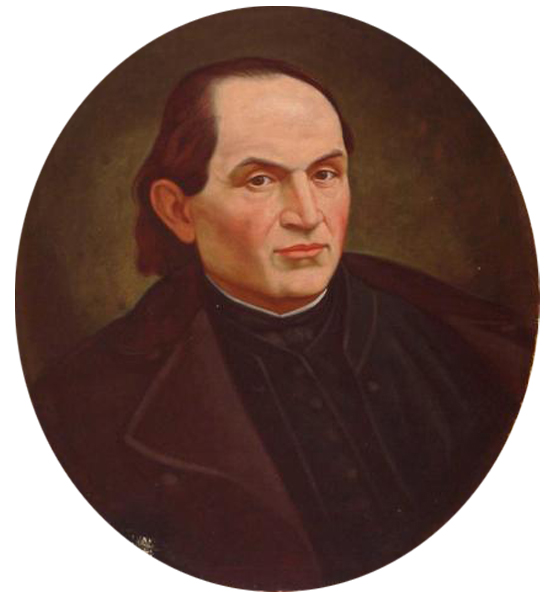
Portrait of Andrej Sládkovič (1872)

After 1839, Klemens also worked as a teacher at a girls' school operated by Amerling, where he experimented with the educational techniques of John Amos Comenius. In 1842, Amerling introduced him to Daguerrotypes in the chemical laboratory at the school. Shortly after, he opened a small photography studio called "Světloobrazárna" (lit. 'light gallery'), in the school's garden. It was only the second such studio in Prague, but financial difficulties forced its closure after a year.

In 1843, Klemens returned to Slovakia, where he devoted himself to geological explorations for coal in Orava and Šariš. He also worked with "Tatrín", a Slovak cultural organization, where he painted the portraits of many notable Slovak nationalists. From 1847 to 1848, he was back in Prague, auditing lectures on medicine at the University of Prague and chemistry at the Technical University. After Amerling's school was ordered closed for its nationalistic tendencies, Klemens attempted to create his own industrial school, but was thwarted by the chaos resulting from the Revolutions of 1848.

He completed his studies in 1849 and went back to his hometown, using his wife's dowry to establish a workshop for manufacturing zinc oxide with equipment he had designed himself. Once again, his enterprise ended in financial failure and he found work painting altarpieces. He briefly considered emigrating to Russia, but accepted an offer to teach at the Belgrade Lyceum (now the University of Belgrade). However, he stayed for only a short time, claiming that the climate was bad for his family's health.

Returning to Prague, Klemens obtained a secondary school teaching certificate and was qualified to teach chemistry, physics and German grammar. In 1856, he won a competitive exam to teach drawing at the Gymnasium in Žilina and remained there until the school was closed in 1863. He then became a professor of natural sciences and drawing at the Catholic high school in Banská Bystrica. He retired in 1878.

In his last years, Klemens suffered from kidney stones. He went to Vienna, seeking surgical relief, but died after the operation.

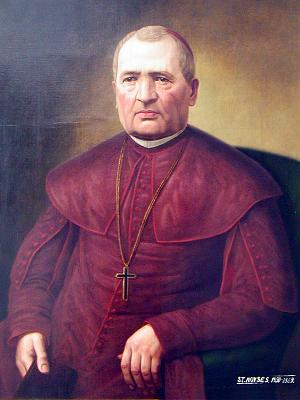
Portrait of Štefan Moyses (1870s)

== Technical and scientific activities ==
In 1865, Klemens came up with a design for a printing machine called the "Samotlač" ('self-print'). The drawings were sent to an exhibition in London, but the idea was never developed. In the late 1870s, he worked on a propulsive steam engine called the "Žiaroruchu" (roughly translated, 'out-motion'), to be used for construction work, and explored the possibility of using exhaust from the machine to inflate balloons that could be used to move heavy machinery. For lack of funds, he failed to create a prototype or obtain a patent, however.

Klemens was a member of Matice česká and a founding member of Matica slovenská. On the basis of his work determining the epicenter of a small earthquake at Žilina in 1858, he was appointed a corresponding member of the "Imperial Geological Institute" in Vienna. He owned one of the largest collections of minerals in Slovakia.
