= Diocese of Žilina =

Roman Catholic diocese in Slovakia

Diocese of Žilina Dioecesis Zilinensis Žilinská Diecéza

Catholic
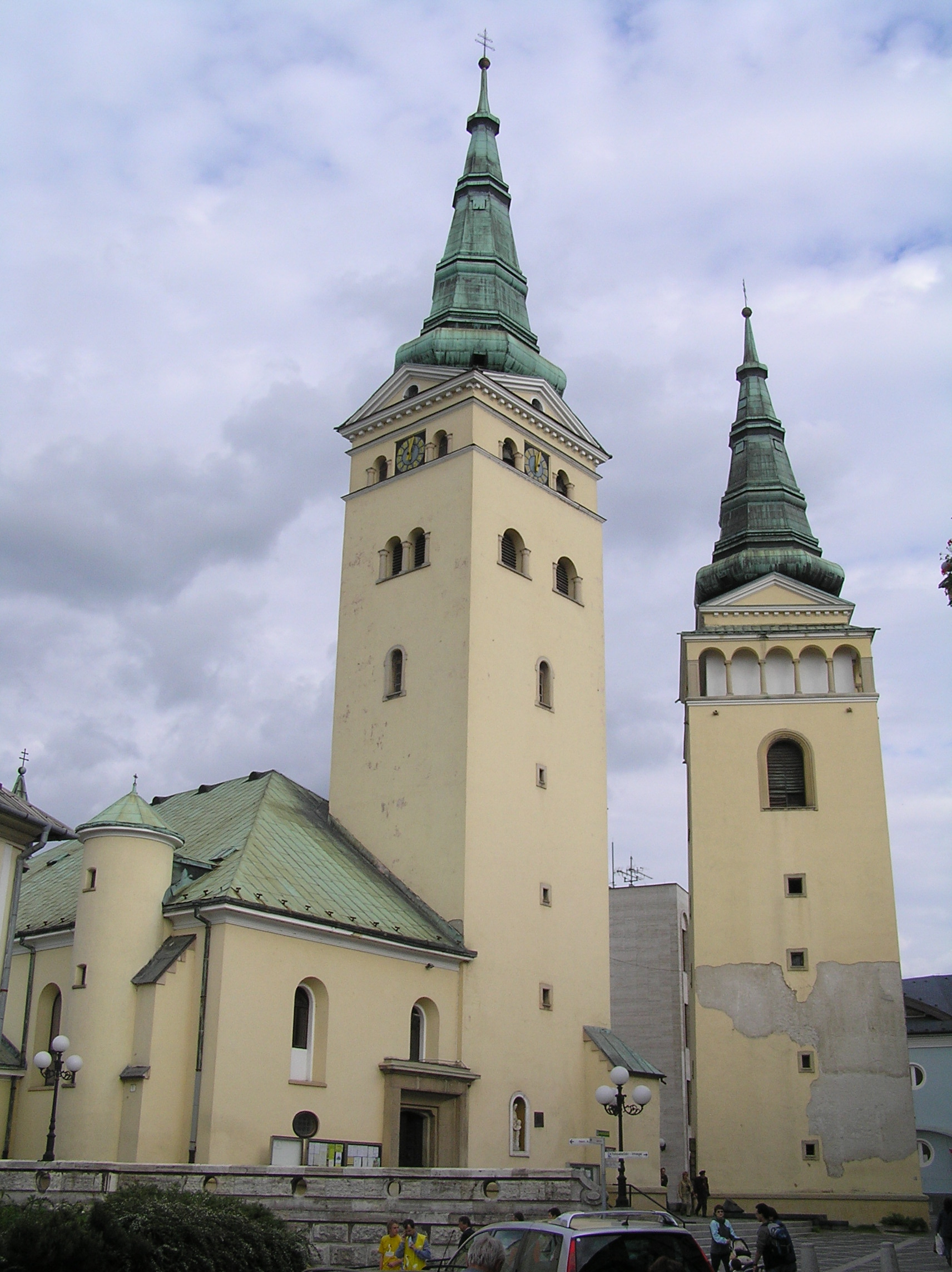
- Cathedral of the Holy Trinity in Žilina

- Coat of arms

Location
- Country: Slovakia
- Territory: NW of Trenčín and W of Žilina regions
- Ecclesiastical province: Bratislava
- Metropolitan: Žilina
- Deaneries: 12

Statistics
- Population: Total; Catholics: (as of 2014); 592,200; 484,200 (81.8%)

Information
- Denomination: Roman Catholic
- Sui iuris church: Latin Church
- Rite: Roman Rite
- Established: 14 February 2008
- Cathedral: Cathedral of the Holy Trinity in Žilina
- Patron saint: Saints Cyril and Methodius

Current leadership
- Pope: Leo XIV
- Bishop: Peter Beňo
- Metropolitan Archbishop: Stanislav Zvolenský
- Vicar General: Mons. ThLic. Marek Hriadel

Map
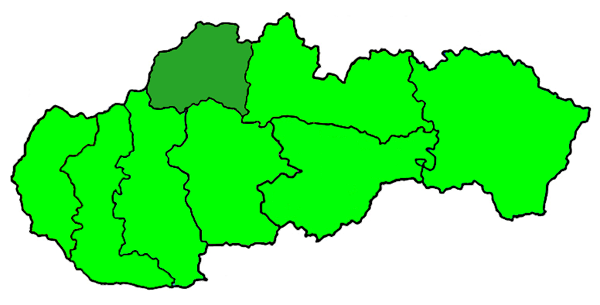
- Map of the Diocese

Website
- Website of the Diocese

The Diocese of Žilina (Slovak: Žilinská Diecéza, Latin: Dioecesis Zilinensis) is a Latin diocese of the Catholic Church in north-western Slovakia including parts of the Trenčín and Žilina regions. It has its seat in Žilina. The current bishop is Peter Beňo.

== History ==
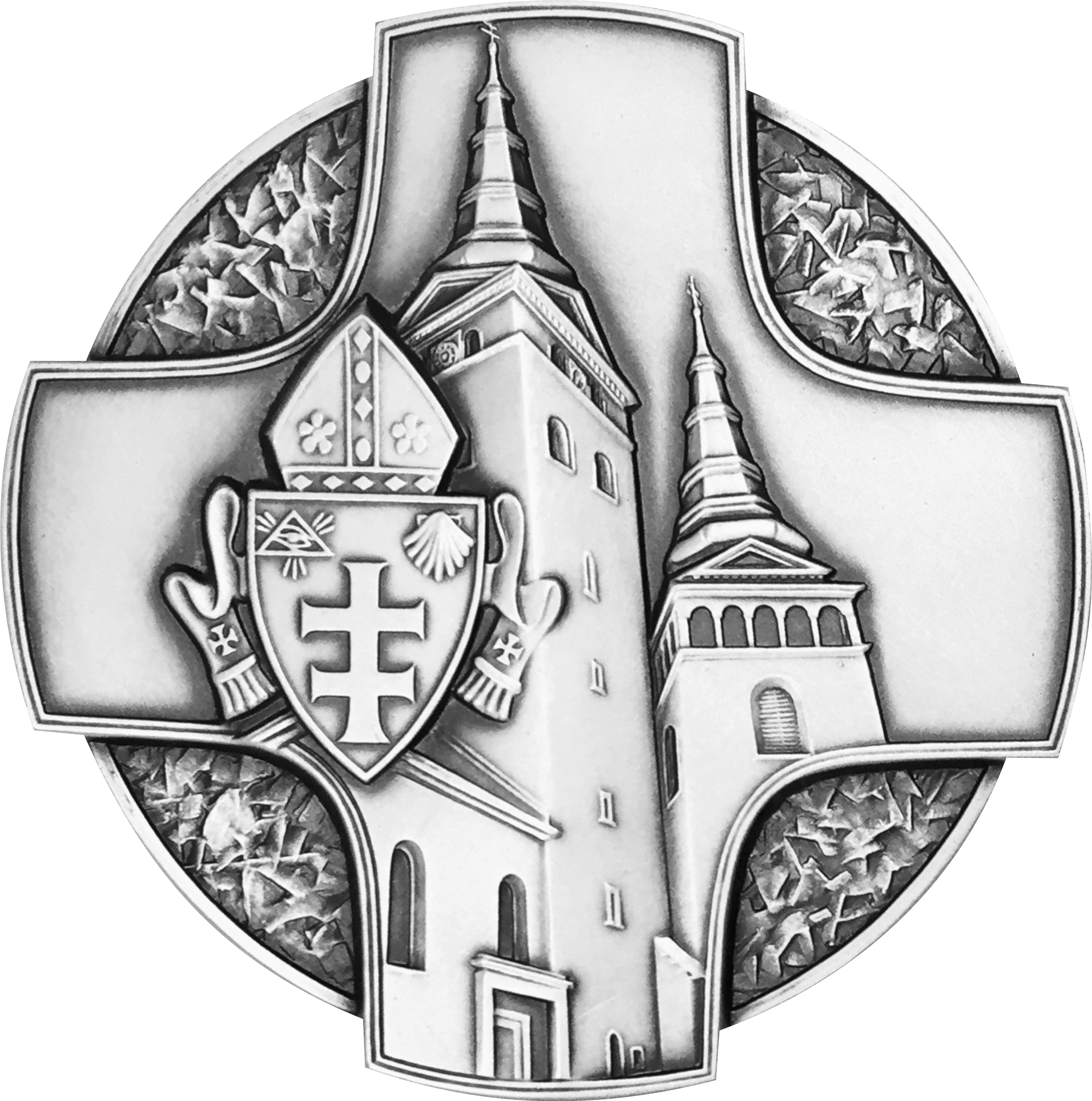
Silver Cross

The diocese was established on 14 February 2008 from the northern parts of the Diocese of Nitra, which shifted more to the south and from a small part of the Diocese of Banská Bystrica.

In 2018, for the diocese’s tenth anniversary, a Silver Cross started to be awarded.

Priest Michal Tichy in Cathedral speaks to Slovaks about Evangelium Mathew 28, 8-15 during the Easter 2022

The newest activities in 2022 from the newly established Chaplain, the Roman Catholic priest Michal Tichy, were connected to another willingness project—The Wikimedia Foundation's interests. The priest allowed Wikipedians, from the first point, to publish the edited record of his Holy Mass freely to the whole world. His own homilies were firstly recorded 18 April 2022 in consideration of the Evangelium of Mathew 28, 8–15.

== Deaneries ==
The diocese currently has 12 deaneries in the towns:

- Bytča
- Čadca
- Ilava
- Krásno nad Kysucou
- Kysucké Nové Mesto
- Martin
- Považská Bystrica
- Púchov
- Rajec
- Turzovka
- Varín
- Žilina
