= Zemplínska Teplica =

Zemplínska Teplica Szécskeresztúr
- Municipality
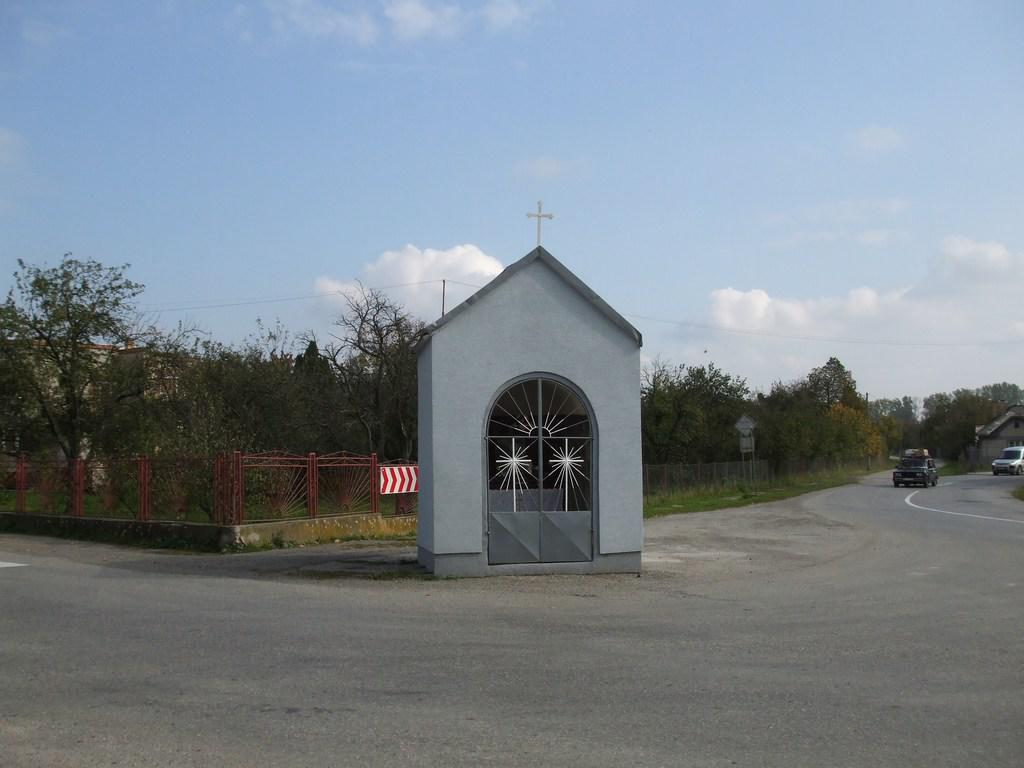
- A chapel in Zemplínska Teplica.

- Flag

- Location of Zemplínska Teplica in the Košice Region Location of Zemplínska Teplica in Slovakia
- Coordinates: 48.65°N 21.57°E
- Country: Slovakia
- Region: Košice Region
- District: Trebišov District
- First mentioned: 1263

Government
  - Mayor: Rastislav Majoroš (The Democratic Party)

Area
  - Total: 26.81 km^{2} (10.35 sq mi)
- Elevation: 204 m (669 ft)

Population (2025)
  - Total: 1,861
- Time zone: UTC+1 (CET)
  - Summer (DST): UTC+2 (CEST)
- Postal code: 766 4
- Area code: +421 56
- Vehicle registration plate (until 2022): TV
- Website: www.zemplinskateplica.sk

Zemplínska Teplica (Hungarian: Szécskeresztúr) is a village and municipality in the Trebišov District in the Košice Region of eastern Slovakia.

First mentioned in 1236 as Cristúr, later Santa Crux, Kereztur, Kiskeresztur, Kerežtur, Križovany, Kerestúr, Zemplínsky Svätý Kríž (Zemplin Holy Cross) holds its present name since 1955

== Geography ==
The municipality lies at an altitude of 204 metres (669 ft) and covers an area of 26.81 km^{2} (10.35 sq mi) (2025).

== Population ==
Population statistic (10 years)
Year	1995	2005	2015	2025
Count	1402	1487	1674	1861
Difference		+6.06%	+12.57%	+11.17%

Population statistic
Year	2024	2025
Count	1859	1861
Difference		+0.10%

It has a population of 1861 people (31 December 2025).

=== Ethnicity ===
Census 2021 (1+ %)
Ethnicity	Number	Fraction
Slovak	1736	96.65%
Romani	94	5.23%
Not found out	53	2.95%
Total	1796	

In year 2021 was 1796 people by ethnicity 1736 as Slovak, 94 as Romani, 53 as Not found out, 14 as Czech, 10 as Other, 5 as Rusyn, 4 as Hungarian, 1 as Ukrainian, 1 as German, 1 as French, 1 as English and 1 as Albanian.

Note on population: The difference values of population numbers in the table "Population statistic" and in the sections "Ethnicity" & "Religion" is caused by the use of various statistical methods.

=== Religion ===
Census 2021 (1+ %)
Religion	Number	Fraction
Roman Catholic Church	1005	55.96%
Greek Catholic Church	447	24.89%
None	234	13.03%
Not found out	57	3.17%
Evangelical Church	18	1%
Total	1796	

In year 2021 was 1796 people by religion 1005 from Roman Catholic Church, 447 from Greek Catholic Church, 234 from None, 57 from Not found out, 18 from Evangelical Church, 9 from Eastern Orthodox Church, 7 from Calvinist Church, 5 from Other and not ascertained christian church, 5 from Jehovah's Witnesses, 3 from Islam, 3 from Buddhism, 2 from Other and 1 from Christian Congregations in Slovakia.
