= Marián Chovanec =

Slovak Roman Catholic prelate (born 1957)

His Excellency Marián Chovanec
- Bishop of Banská Bystrica
- Church: Roman Catholic
- Appointed: 20 November 2012
- Predecessor: Rudolf Baláž
- Previous post: Auxiliary Bishop of Nitra (1999–2012)

Orders
- Ordination: 17 June 1989
- Consecration: 18 September 1999 by Ján Chryzostom Korec

Personal details
- Born: 16 September 1957 (age 69) Trenčín, Czechoslovakia
- Education: John Paul II Catholic University of Lublin; Comenius University
- Motto: Omnia impendam pro animabus vestris! (Latin for 'I will give up everything for your souls')
- Coat of arms: Marián Chovanec's coat of arms

Styles of Marián Chovanec
- Reference style: His Excellency; The Most Reverend
- Spoken style: Your Excellency
- Religious style: Bishop

Marián Chovanec (born 16 September 1957) is a Slovak Roman Catholic prelate. Since 2012 he serves as the bishop of the Diocese of Banská Bystrica.

== Biography ==
Marián Chovanec was born on 16 September 1957 in Trenčín. He studied theology at the Comenius University in Bratislava. In 1981 his studies were suspended by the communist regime as a punishment for Chovanec's participation in a hunger strike against the pro-regime priestly organization Pacem in Terris. He was allowed to return to his studies in 1986. In 1990 he continued his studies at the John Paul II Catholic University of Lublin, where he earned a doctorate in dogmatic theology in 1994.

Chovanec was ordained as a priest on 17 June 1989. Afterwards he served as a priest and archivist of the Roman Catholic Diocese of Nitra. On 22 July 1999 he was appointed auxiliary bishop of Nitra and titular bishop of Maxita by the Pope John Paul II. He was consecrated on 18 September 1999 at the St. Emmeram's Cathedral in Nitra by the bishop of Nitra, Cardinal Ján Chryzostom Korec.

On 20 November 2012, Pope Benedict XVI appointed Chovanec the bishop of Banská Bystrica to replace bishop Rudolf Baláž, who had suddenly died a year prior.
