= Diocese of Banská Bystrica =

Roman Catholic diocese in central Slovakia

Coordinates: 48.7354°N 19.1462°E

Diocese of Banská Bystrica Dioecesis Neosoliensis Banskobystrická Diecéza

Catholic
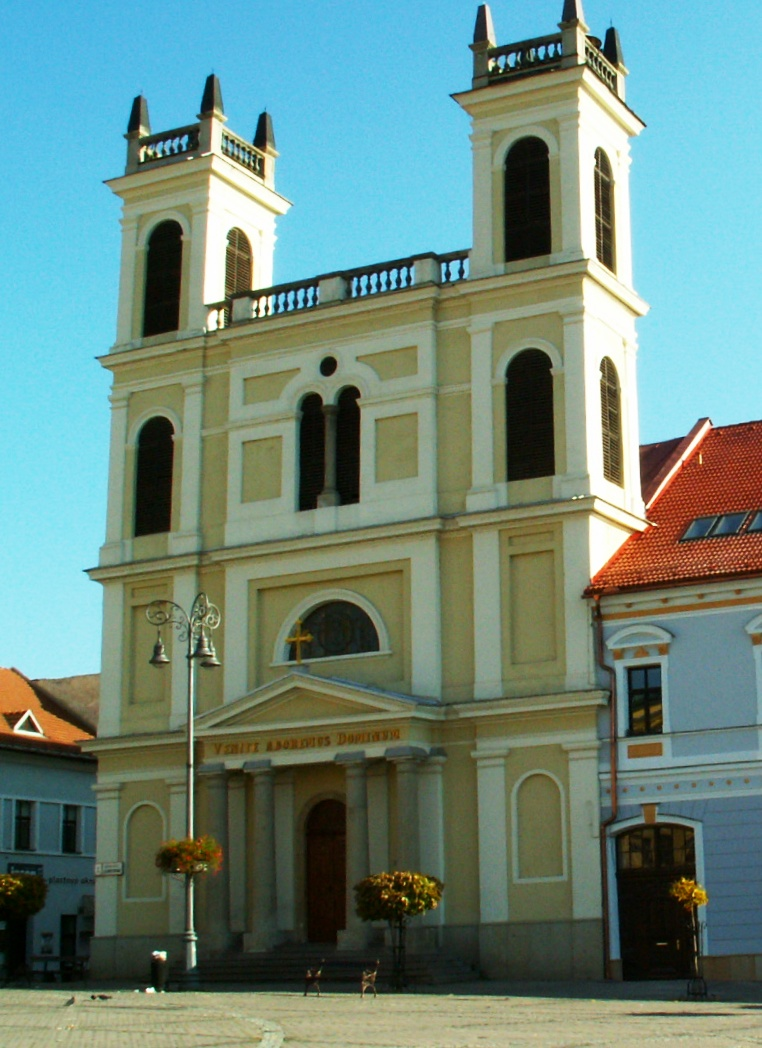
- Cathedral of St. Francis Xavier in Banská Bystrica

- Coat of arms

Location
- Country: Slovakia
- Territory: Western part of Banská Bystrica, parts of Žilina, Nitra and Trenčín regions
- Ecclesiastical province: Bratislava
- Metropolitan: Bratislava

Statistics
- Area: 6,750 km^{2} (2,610 sq mi)
- Population: Total; Catholics: (as of 2020); 594,124; ▼366,258 (▼61.6%)
- Parishes: 155

Information
- Denomination: Roman Catholic
- Sui iuris church: Latin Church
- Rite: Roman Rite
- Established: 13 March 1776
- Cathedral: Cathedral of St. Francis Xavier in Banská Bystrica

Current leadership
- Pope: Leo XIV
- Bishop: Marián Chovanec

Map
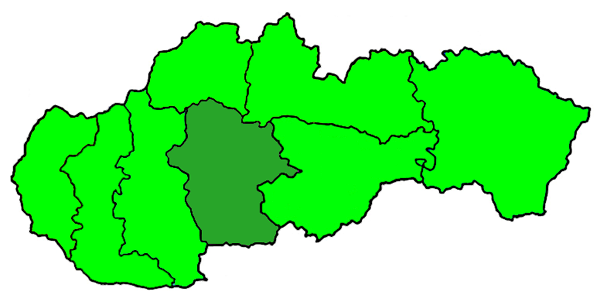
- Map of the Diocese

The Diocese of Banská Bystrica (Slovak: Banskobystrická diecéza, Latin: Dioecesis Neosoliensis) is a Latin Church diocese of the Catholic Church in central Slovakia. Its seat is in Banská Bystrica. On Tuesday 20 November 2012, according to biographical information in a press release from the Holy See Press Office's Vatican Information Service (VIS), Pope Benedict XVI appointed Auxiliary Bishop Marián Chovanec of the Roman Catholic Diocese of Nitra (based in Nitra, Slovakia), Titular Bishop of Massita, as Bishop-elect of the Roman Catholic Diocese of Banská Bystrica. Bishop Chovanec was born on 16 September 1957 in Trenčin, Slovakia, a part of the Diocese of Nitra. He was expelled from the Seminary in Bratislava, Slovakia, because he had refused to cooperate with the Government-backed Association "Pacem in Terris" (Peace on Earth). He then worked as a laborer. After seven years, he was able to conclude his theological studies and be ordained a priest in 1989; he became an Auxiliary Bishop of Nitra in 1999 and Vicar General in 2003 and is active in the Slovak Bishops' Conference.

== History ==
The diocese was established on 13 March 1776 as a suffragan of the Archdiocese of Esztergom. On 30 December 1977, it was taken from the former and became part of the newly created Slovak ecclesiastical province with metropolitan being the Diocese of Trnava, which was renamed on 31 March 1995 to the Archdiocese of Bratislava-Trnava. It covers western and central parts of the Banská Bystrica Region, eastern parts of the Trenčín Region and southern central parts of the Žilina Region. It covered an area of 5,424 km^{2} with 590,494 people of which 62% were of Catholic faith (2006).

On 14 February 2008, as a part of the changes in Slovak dioceses, the diocese lost area around Martin to the newly created Diocese of Žilina and territory around Brezno to Diocese of Rožňava. On the other hand, it gained former eastern areas of the Archdiocese of Bratislava-Trnava (from Banská Štiavnica to Šahy and Veľký Krtíš) (see e.g. this map (in Slovak), and some other border changes occurred as well.

Jozef Feranec held the title from 1973 until 1990.

== Bishops ==
Bishop or administrator	Appointment date	End date	Notes	Picture
Marián Chovanec (born 16 September 1957)	20 November 2012		Appointed by Pope Benedict XVI.	
Marián Bublinec	28 July 2011	20 November 2012	Apostolic administrator, following the death of Bishop Rudolf Baláž.	
Rudolf Baláž (20 November 1940 – 27 July 2011)	14 February 1990	27 July 2011	First and only bishop born within the diocese.	
Jozef Feranec (14 March 1910 – 3 May 2003)	19 February 1973	14 February 1990	Retired in 1990.	
Andrej Škrábik (13 May 1882 – 8 January 1950)	21 August 1943	8 January 1950	Appointed coadjutor bishop on 14 June 1941. Dr. Škrábik was a university professor of theology, a judge of the ecclesiastical court, and an author of polemical work in defense of the Catholic Church and religion. During the Second World War, he used the seminary and the episcopal residence to hide many political exponents. Together with Dr. John Balk is credited with the rescue of ten people.	
Marián Blaha (10 July 1869 – 21 August 1943)	20 December 1920	21 August 1943	Appointed bishop by Pope Benedict XV.	
Wolfgang Radnai (25 March 1848 – 14 October 1935)	11 July 1904	16 December 1920	Resigned in 1920.	
Karol Rimely (4 February 1925 – 13 January 1904	25 May 1893	13 January 1904		
Imre Bende (28 August 1824 – 18 March 1911)	8 November 1886	18 March 1911		
Arnold Ipolyi-Stummer (22 October 1823 – 2 December 1886	23 September 1871	1886		
Sigismund Suppan (18 January 1814 – 17 July 1881)	30 March 1870	7 October 1870	Resigned.	
Štefan Moyses (24 October 1797 – 5 July 1869)	5 September 1850	5 July 1869		Portrait by Jozef Božetech Klemens
Józef Rudňanský (28 October 1788 – 24 November 1859)	22 August 1844	14 March 1850	Resigned.	
Jozef Belanský (20 June 1769 – 3 January 1843)	10 October 1823	3 January 1843	Emperor Francis II appointed him bishop on 4 March 1823, and the Pope confirmed it in November 1823.	
Anton Makai (24 February 1756 – 8 January 1825)	7 August 1818	1823	Selected bishop of Veszprém on 10 October 1823.	
Gabriel Zerdahelyi (16 October 1742 – 5 October 1813	22 December 1800	5 October 1813		
František Berchtold (25 June 1730 – 14 August 1793	15 January 1776	14 August 1793		

== Churches ==
- Church of Saint Matthew of Zolná

== See also ==
- Ján Dechet
