= Jozef Haľko =

Slovak Roman Catholic bishop

His Excellency Mons. Jozef Haľko
- Auxiliary Bishop of the Archdiocese of Bratislava; Titular Bishop of Serra
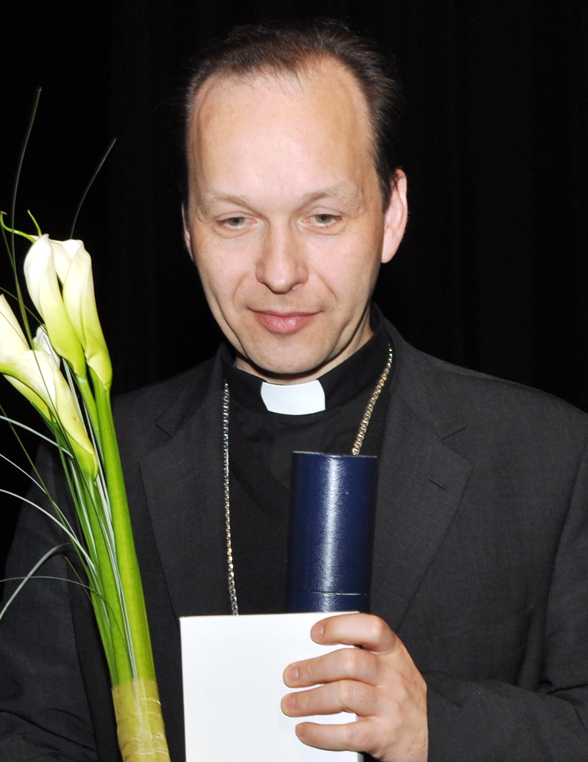
- Jozef Haľko in 2012
- Church: Roman Catholic Church
- Archdiocese: Archdiocese of Bratislava
- Appointed: 31 January 2012
- Installed: 17 March 2012

Orders
- Ordination: 4 July 1994 by Ján Sokol
- Consecration: 17 March 2012 by Stanislav Zvolenský
- Rank: Auxiliary Bishop

Personal details
- Born: 10 May 1964 (age 62) Bratislava, Czechoslovakia
- Motto: Resurrexit! (He rose from the dead!)
- Coat of arms

Jozef Haľko (born 10 May 1964) is an Auxiliary Bishop of the Roman Catholic Archdiocese of Bratislava, Titular Bishop of Serra, professor of church history at the Roman Catholic Cyrilo-Methodian Theological Faculty at the Comenius University in Bratislava and an author.

== Early life ==
Haľko was born on 10 May 1964 in Bratislava as the grandson of Jozef Haľko Sr., one of the first Greek Catholic priests in Bratislava. Following his gymnasial studies, he studied at the University of Economics in Bratislava. Following his studies, he attempted to continue his education at the Faculty of Theology at the Comenius University. His applications were, however, denied by the socialist regime. Consequently, he began to work as labourer in Bratislava waterworks and a caregiver in a social care institute.

== Theological studies and early priesthood ==
Haľko began his studies at the Theological Faculty of Comenius University after the Velvet Revolution in 1990. He completed his studies at the Pontifical University of the Holy Cross in Rome. On 4 July 1994, Haľko was ordained a priest by Ján Sokol, the Metropolitan Archbishop of Trnava, in the city's Cathedral of St. John the Baptist.

In October 1997, he was named the chaplain of Bratislava's St. Martin's Cathedral and he was entrusted with the pastoral care of the Hungarian ethnic and linguistic minority. He also began to work at the Department of Church history at the Faculty of Theology, where he began his studies. He wrote scripts for STV, he was an accompanying commentator during broadcast Masses from the Vatican and he also cooperated with Czech Catholic broadcaster TV Noe. He contributed to academic journals and regularly contributed to the Slovak broadcast of the Vatican Radio.

In 2000, Haľko had completed his doctoral studies on the topic of Church history at the Pontifical University of the Holy Cross and in 2006 he became an associate professor at the Theological Faculty of Comenius University. Since 2008, he led the media department of the newly established Archdiocese of Bratislava, serving as its spokesperson. In 2009, Pope Benedict XVI named him a Monsignor - the chaplain to His Holiness.

Between 2009 and 2010, Haľko coordinated the research of the subterranean levels at St. Martin's Cathedral, which led to the identification of the resting place of Péter Pázmány. In February 2013, based on this research, the university approved the professoral application filed by the Faculty of Theology and he was subsequently named professor of Catholic theology. President of Slovakia Ivan Gašparovič had named him a professor in November 2013.

== Bishop ==
On 31 January 2012, Pope Benedict XVI had named Haľko the first auxiliary bishop of the Archdiocese of Bratislava and a titular Bishop of Serra. He was consecrated on 17 March 2012 in St. Martin's Cathedral by the hands of the Archbishop Stanislav Zvolenský, Apostolic Nuncius Mario Giordana and Prefect Emeritus of the Congregation for the Evangelization of Peoples Jozef Tomko. On 21 March 2012, he was additionally named the vicar general of the Archdiocese.

Within the Slovak Episcopal Conference, Haľko presided the Council of Expatriate Slovaks and Migrant's and Refugee's Council. Since November 2012, Haľko is a delegate of the Conference at COMECE.

=== Social media engagement ===
As a Bishop, Haľko is pastorally active on social media, namely YouTube and Facebook. His main content includes a Na minútku ('For a minute') weekly series, where he shares short one-minute Gospel passages and sermons from next Sunday's Gospel and he also informs of his pastoral activities at home and abroad, as well as interesting facts and lessons from Church's history.

== Criticism ==
In January 2022, Jozef Haľko faced criticism after commenting on the first episode of the Priznanie series broadcast by public broadcaster RTVS. In a video on Facebook, he compared the romantic kiss and expression of love of two women in the series to Marxist ideological propaganda and manipulation. He further called the series "homosexual propaganda" and added that it can be "very harmful or even devastating" for young people. He repeatedly called homosexual orientation a "problem". He added that expressions of love in gay couples do not belong on the screen.
