= Ján Orosch =

Slovak catholic archbishop

The Most Reverend Ján Orosch
- Archbishop of Trnava
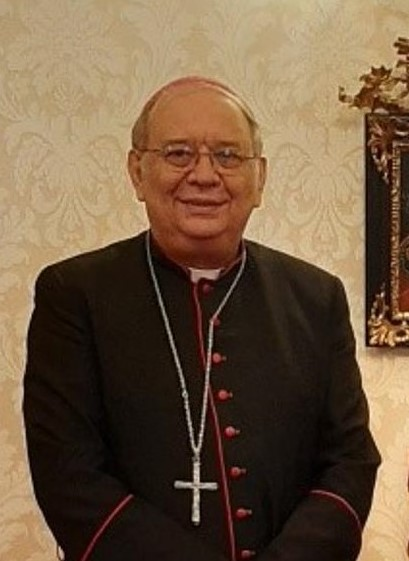
- Church: Roman Catholic Church
- Archdiocese: Trnava
- See: Trnava
- Appointed: 11 July 2013
- Installed: 30 August 2013
- Predecessor: Róbert Bezák
- Previous posts: Auxiliary Bishop of Bratislava-Trnava (2004-08); Titular Bishop of Semina (2004-13); Auxiliary Bishop of Trnava (2008-12); Apostolic Administrator of Trnava (2012-13)

Orders
- Ordination: 6 June 1976 by Julius Gábriš
- Consecration: 2 May 2004 by Ján Sokol

Personal details
- Born: Ján Orosch; 28 May 1953 (age 73) Bratislava, Slovakia
- Motto: Corde videre
- Coat of arms

Ján Orosch (born 28 May 1953, Bratislava) is a Roman Catholic prelate currently serving as the Archbishop of Trnava.

== Biography ==
After graduating, he was ordained to the priesthood by bishop Julius Gábriš on 6 June 1976 in Bratislava. He worked in Komárno, Bušince, Okoč (1982), Hodruša-Hámre (1983), Vyškovce nad Ipľom(1984), Nové Zámky(1990), Bratislava-Prievoz (1991) and Bratislava-Čunovo (1992).

Pope John Paul II on 2 April 2004 appointed him Auxiliary Bishop of Bratislava-Trnava and the titular bishop of Semina. received his episcopal ordination on 2 May 2004, together with today's Archbishop Stanislav Zvolenský in the Cathedral of SS. John the Baptist in Trnava.

On 2 July 2012 Pope Benedict XVI appointed him apostolic administrator after Archbishop Róbert Bezák was dismissed from the Archdiocese of Trnava. On 11 July 2013 Pope Francis named him Apostolic Administrator for Archbishop of Trnava.

Orosch is the Grand Prior of the Slovakia Lieutenancy of the Equestrian Order of the Holy Sepulchre of Jerusalem.

In November 2022, Orosch questioned the innocence of the two victims of a terrorist attack outside a gay bar in Bratislava. His comments were condemned by Slovakian President Zuzana Čaputová and Prime Minister Eduard Heger among others and he was awarded the Homophobe of the Year prize by the NGO Human Rights Institute. He later apologized for the comments.
