= Ján Havlík =

Slovak Roman Catholic martyr (1928–1965)

Blessed Ján Havlík CM
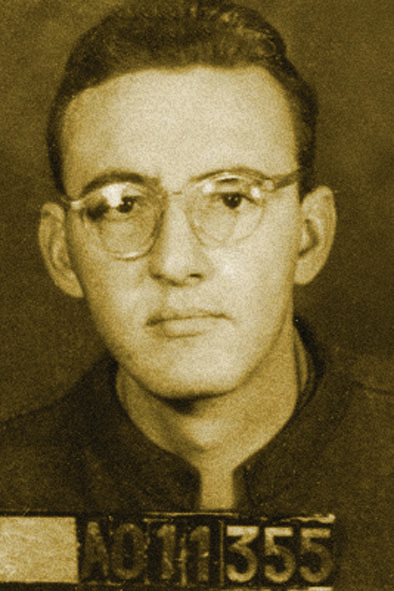
- Blessed Ján Havlík as a prisonner

Martyr
- Born: 12 February 1928; Dubovce, Czechoslovakia
- Died: 27 December 1965 (aged 37); Skalica, Czechoslovakia
- Beatified: 31 August 2024, Šaštín-Stráže by Pope Francis through the papal legate Marcello Semeraro
- Feast: 12 February (Memorial)
- Attributes: Prison uniform

Ján Havlík CM (12 February 1928 – 27 December 1965) was a Slovak Catholic seminarian with the Congregation of the Mission. He was beatified by Pope Francis in 2024 for his martyrdom under Communist rule in Czechoslovakia. His feast day is 12 February. He was dubbed "the martyr of faithfulness" by the Conference of Slovak Bishops.

== Biography ==
=== Early life and education ===
Ján Havlík was born on 12 February 1928 in the village of Dubovce in the Skalica District. He was the eldest of four children. His family was poor and very religious. As a child, he was influenced by his aunt Angela, who was a nun of the Daughters of Charity of Saint Vincent de Paul.

Havlík started his education at the elementary school in Holíč, where he had to walk 8 kilometers daily from his home village to attend classes. In 1943 he enrolled at the Lazarist missionary school in Banská Bystrica, planning to study at a seminary and become a priest after graduation. Nonetheless, the school was evacuated following the breakout of the Slovak National Uprising and the students were sent home. Havlík was only able to return to Banská Bystrica and resume his education after the war.

By the time he eventually graduated in 1949, the seminaries were either closed or controlled by the agents of the Communist authorities and not recognized by the Vatican. Consequently, Havlík opted to instead enter novitiate with the Lazarists and study at an underground seminary. Nonetheless, even this alternative plan did not go smoothly as the authorities forcibly removed all the novices to a reeducation camp in Kostolná-Záriečie. After that, Havlík was forced into hard manual labor building a dam in Púchov. After the dam was finally completed in August 1950, he moved to a rented apartment in Nitra, found a laborer job while continuing to study at the underground seminary.

=== Arrest and persecution ===
On 29 October 1951, StB agents stormed the rented apartment and arrested Havlík and his roommates, who also studied at the underground seminary. Havlík was detained without trial for 15 months, while regularly tortured.

In February 1953 he was charged of treason and espionage for the Vatican. In spite of the harsh treatment, he refused to admit guilt, insisting "My only goal was to become a priest. I acted according to my conscience. This is all I have to say." He was sentenced to 10 years of hard labor. He was transported to the work camp Equality in Jáchymov, where he was forced to work at a uranium mine. While working at the mine, he was repeatedly injured and underwent a back surgery.

In spite of cruel treatment, Havlík continued to serve the Church by smuggling small pieces of sacramental bread hidden in cigarette papers into the camp and distributing them to his fellow prisoners. In 1958, the authorities learned about this. Havlík was placed in a solitary imprisonment and sentenced to another year of hard labour. His health quickly deteriorated and by 1960 he was nearly constantly in the hospital and clearly incapable of physical labour. Havlík formally applied for release due to his poor health but his application was denied.

=== Late years and death ===
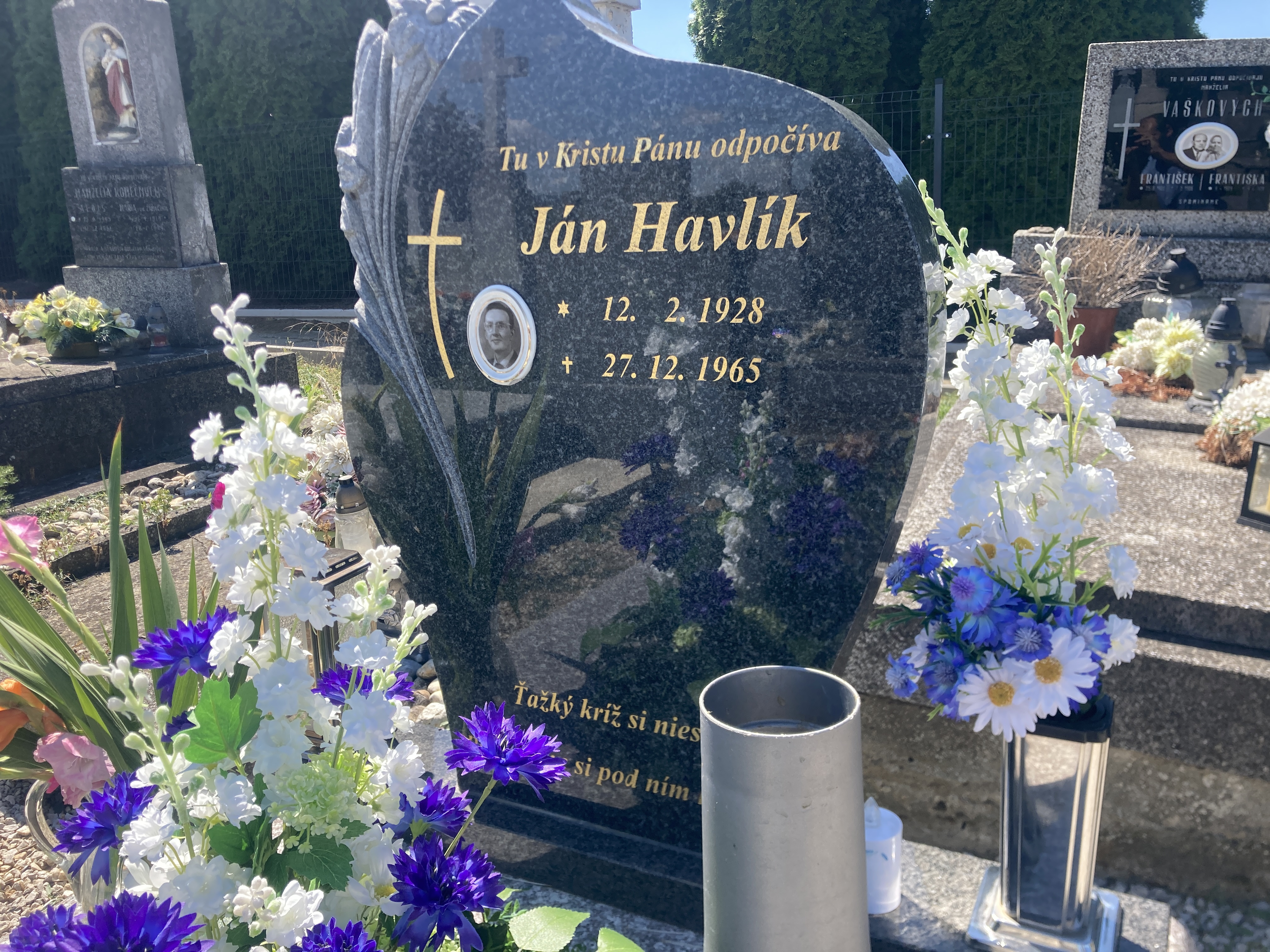
The grave of Ján Havlík.

Havlík was finally released in 1962 after nine years of hard labour. He was assigned a disability pension of only 407 crowns, about a third of standard laborer's wage. When he complained, his pension was further decreased to 300 crowns. For the rest of his life, Havlík depended on his parents for financial support to afford life necessities.

In 1965 he was again hospitalized. He was released from hospital on Christmas Eve. Just two days later, on 27 December he collapsed after attending the morning Mass in Skalica. Havlík was found barely conscious leaning against a rubbish bin by Dr. Barát, a gynecologist who was taking out the trash. Barát carried Havlík into his home with the aid of another passer-by, where Havlík died soon thereafter. Havlík was buried in his home village of Dubovce.

=== Beatification ===
Havlík's beatification was initiated by the Lazarist priest Augustín Slaninka and supported by the Salesian priest Anton Srholec. The process was formally initiated on Sunday, 9 June 2013 in Skalica by the Archbishop of Bratislava Stanislav Zvolenský. The diocese phase ended on 24 February 2018. With the consent of the Pope Benedict XVI, Havlík's death was considered martyrdom although he did not die directly of the torture. Pope Francis issued a decree confirming Havlík's martyrdom in odium fidei (in hatred of the faith). On 7 July 2024, the remains of Havlík were exhumated for the purpose of creating relics.

Havlík was beatified on Saturday, 31 August at Šaštín-Stráže by the papal legate Marcello Semeraro, the prefect of the Dicastery for the Causes of Saints. The ceremony was attended by about 30 bishops, 370 priests and 13,000 faithful.

Havlík's relics are displayed in the Church of Saint Vincent de Paul in the Ružinov borough of Bratislava. A newly constructed chapel of the Blessed Ján Havlík was constructed in the church to hold the relics. 11 vertical columns are installed in the chapel symbolizing 11 years Havlík spent imprisoned for his faith. Litanies to Ján Havlík were published in March 2023 in preparation for the beatification. The writer Daniel Hevier wrote the words of the hymn to Blessed Ján Havlík.
