= Conference of Slovak Bishops =

Assembly of Catholic bishops

The Conference of Bishops of Slovakia
- Konferencia biskupov Slovenska
- Abbreviation: KBS
- Formation: 1993; 33 years ago
- Type: Episcopal conference
- Purpose: To support the ministry of bishops
- Headquarters: Bratislava, Slovakia
- Coordinates: 48.8493°N 2.31136°E
- Region served: Slovakia
- President: Archbishop Stanislav Zvolenský
- Main organ: Conference
- Website: kbs.sk (in Slovak)

The Conference of Bishops of Slovakia (Konferencia biskupov Slovenska) (KBS), was established on 23 March 1993, and is composed of the Catholic bishops in active service (both Latin and Byzantine rite) in the Slovak Republic.

== Function ==
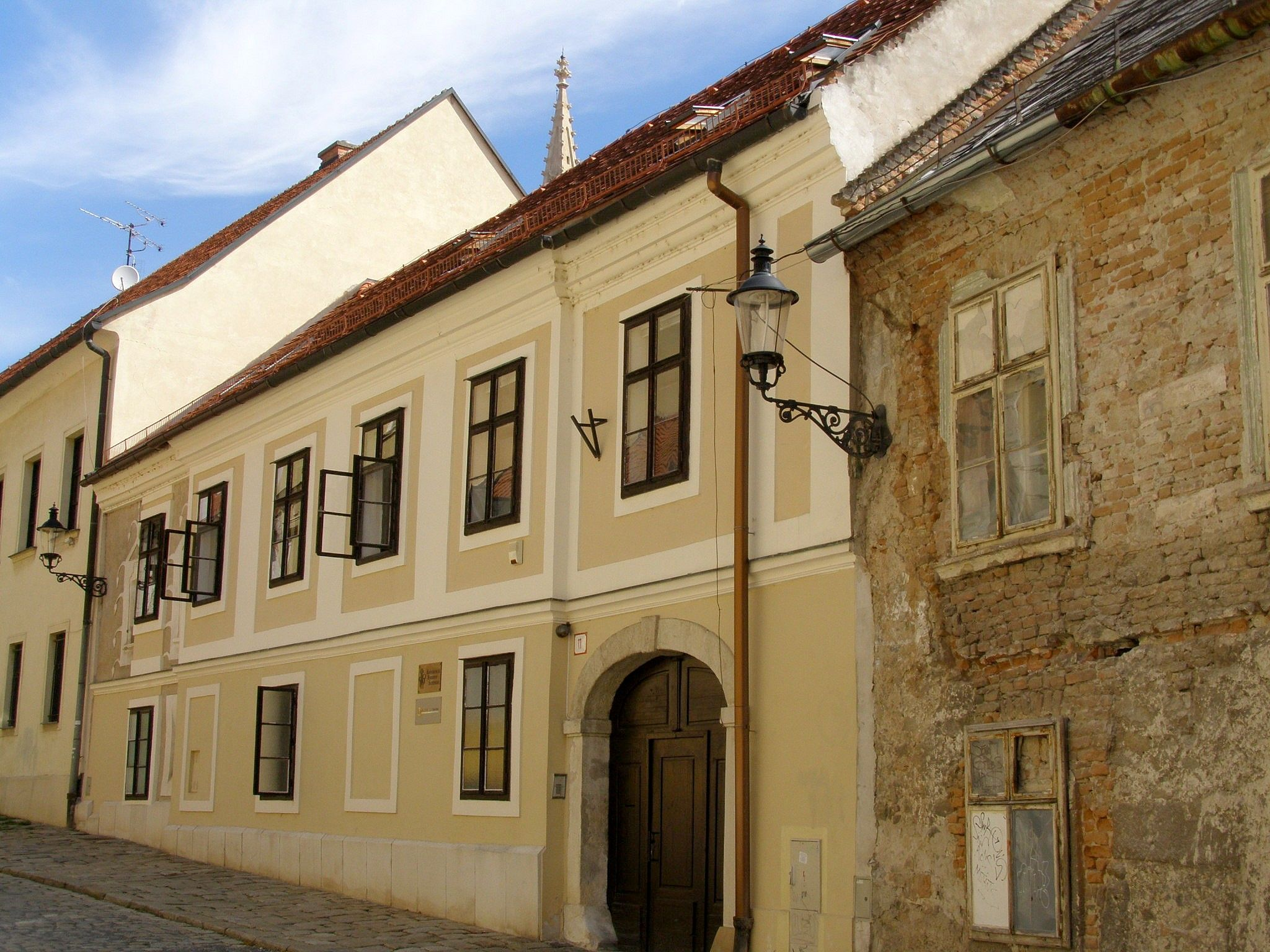
Seat of the Conference on the Kapitulská street in the Bratislava old town

The bishops gather together to clarify the form and manner of the apostolic activities in Slovakia. They gather and act in accordance with various Church laws which take into account local circumstances (cf. c. 447 and 449, § 1 CIC).

The conference is based on the law itself have legal personality (cf. c. 449, § 2 CIC).

The conference includes all diocesan bishops of the Slovak Republic and according to their rights on a par with the position, and coadjutor bishops, auxiliary bishops and other titular bishops who are in that territory or outside it perform a specific task entrusted to them the Apostolic See or the Episcopal Conference of the common good of the country (cf. c. 450, § 1 CIC).

Emeritus Bishops are not members of the Episcopal Conference of Slovakia, but may be invited as consultors of several plenary sessions and to be members of some episcopal commissions. The sessions and committees include: Plenary Session, the Permanent Council General Secretariat, Council for Economic Affairs and the Committee and the Conference Board provided for a defined purpose (cf. c. 451, CIC), according to the Statute of the Slovak Bishops' Conference adopted on 21 6th 2000, Art. 1 to 4.

== The Conference of Bishops of Slovakia ==
President: Metropolitan Archbishop Stanislav Zvolenský

=== Western Ecclesiastical province ===
- Stanislav Zvolenský - Metropolitan Archbishop of Bratislava
- Jozef Haľko - Auxiliary Bishop of Bratislava
- Ján Orosch - Archbishop of Trnava
- Viliam Judák - Diocesan Bishop of Nitra
- Peter Beňo - Diocesan Bishop of Žilina
- Marián Chovanec - Diocesan Bishop of Banská Bystrica

=== Eastern Ecclesiastical province ===
- Marek Forgáč - Metropolitan Archbishop of Košice
- Stanislav Stolárik - Diocesan Bishop of Rožňava
- František Trstenský - Diocesan Bishop of Spiš
- Ján Kuboš - Auxiliary Bishop of Spiš

=== Military ordinariate ===
- Pavol Šajgalík - Bishop – Ordinary of the Military Ordinariate

=== Prešov Ecclesiastical province (Greek Catholic) ===
- Jonáš Maxim - Metropolitan Archieparch of Prešov and head of the Slovak Greek Catholic Church
- Cyril Vasiľ - Eparchial Bishop of Košice
- Milan Lach - Eparchial Bishop of Bratislava

== See also ==
- Caritas Slovakia
