= Stanislav Zvolenský =

Slovak prelate

His Excellency Stanislav Zvolenský
- Archbishop of Bratislava
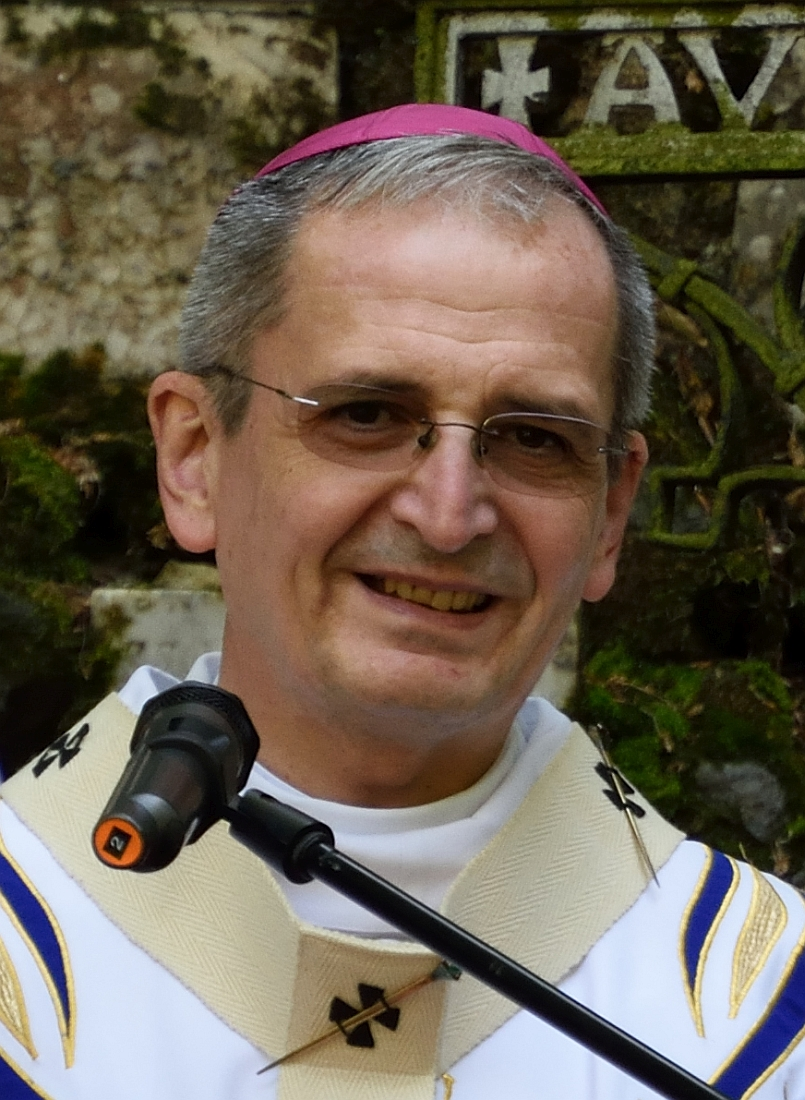
- Archbishop Stanislav Zvolenský
- Church: Roman Catholic
- Appointed: 14 February 2008
- Installed: 8 March 2008
- Other post: President of the Conference of Slovak Bishops
- Previous post: Auxiliary Bishop of Bratislava-Trnava (2004-2008)

Orders
- Ordination: 13 June 1982 by Julius Gábriš
- Consecration: 2 May 2004 by Ján Sokol

Personal details
- Born: November 19, 1958 (age 67) Trnava, Czechoslovakia
- Coat of arms

Styles of Stanislav Zvolenský
- Reference style: The Most Reverend
- Spoken style: Your Excellency
- Religious style: Monsignor
- Posthumous style: not applicable

Stanislav Zvolenský (born November 19, 1958) is a Slovak Catholic prelate who has served as the first Archbishop of Bratislava since 2008.

== Biography ==
Stanislav Zvolenský was born in Trnava, and was ordained to the priesthood by Bishop Julius Gábriš on June 13, 1982.

On April 2, 2004, he was appointed Auxiliary Bishop of Bratislava-Trnava and Titular Bishop of Nova Sinna by Pope John Paul II. Zvolenský received his episcopal consecration on the following May 2 from Archbishop Ján Sokol, with Archbishop Henryk Józef Nowacki and Bishop Dominik Tóth serving as co-consecrators.

He was later named the first Archbishop of Bratislava by Pope Benedict XVI on February 14, 2008, whence the archdiocese was split into that of Bratislava and of Trnava. Zvolenský was installed as Archbishop on March 8. He is the chairman of Slovak Bishop's Conference since 28 October 2009. He served in this position for four consecutive four-year terms until he was replaced on 103rd Plenary Session of the Conference by Metropolitan Archbishop Bernard Bober.

Preceded by Ján Sokol	Archbishop of Bratislava; 2008–present	Succeeded by incumbent
