= Serra (titular see) =

Catholic titular see in Tunisia

Serra is a titular see of the Catholic Church.

It goes back to a defunct bishopric in the ancient city Serra in the Roman province of Africa proconsularis (today in northern Tunisia). The bishopric was in the ecclesiastical province of Carthage.

The Holy See identifies the titular see as "Serrensi in Proconsulari" as well as "Serra".

Titular bishops of Serra
Name	Position	From	To
Józef Olszański	Auxiliary Bishop of Chełm, Poland	25 June 1727	16 May 1738
Krzysztof Michal Dobinski	Auxiliary Bishop of Gniezno, Poland	27 June 1738	21 July 1769
Francis Joseph Green	Auxiliary Bishop of Tucson, USA	29 May 1953	28 September 1960
Saverio Zupi; Titular bishop pro hac vice	Apostolic Internuncio	28 October 1961	1 May 1983
Clemente Faccani; Titular bishop pro hac vice	Apostolic Pro-Nuncio	27 June 1983	15 September 2011
Jozef Haľko	Auxiliary Bishop of Bratislava, Slovakia	31 January 2012	
