= Julius Gábriš =

The Most Reverend Július Gábriš
- Apostolic Administrator of Trnava
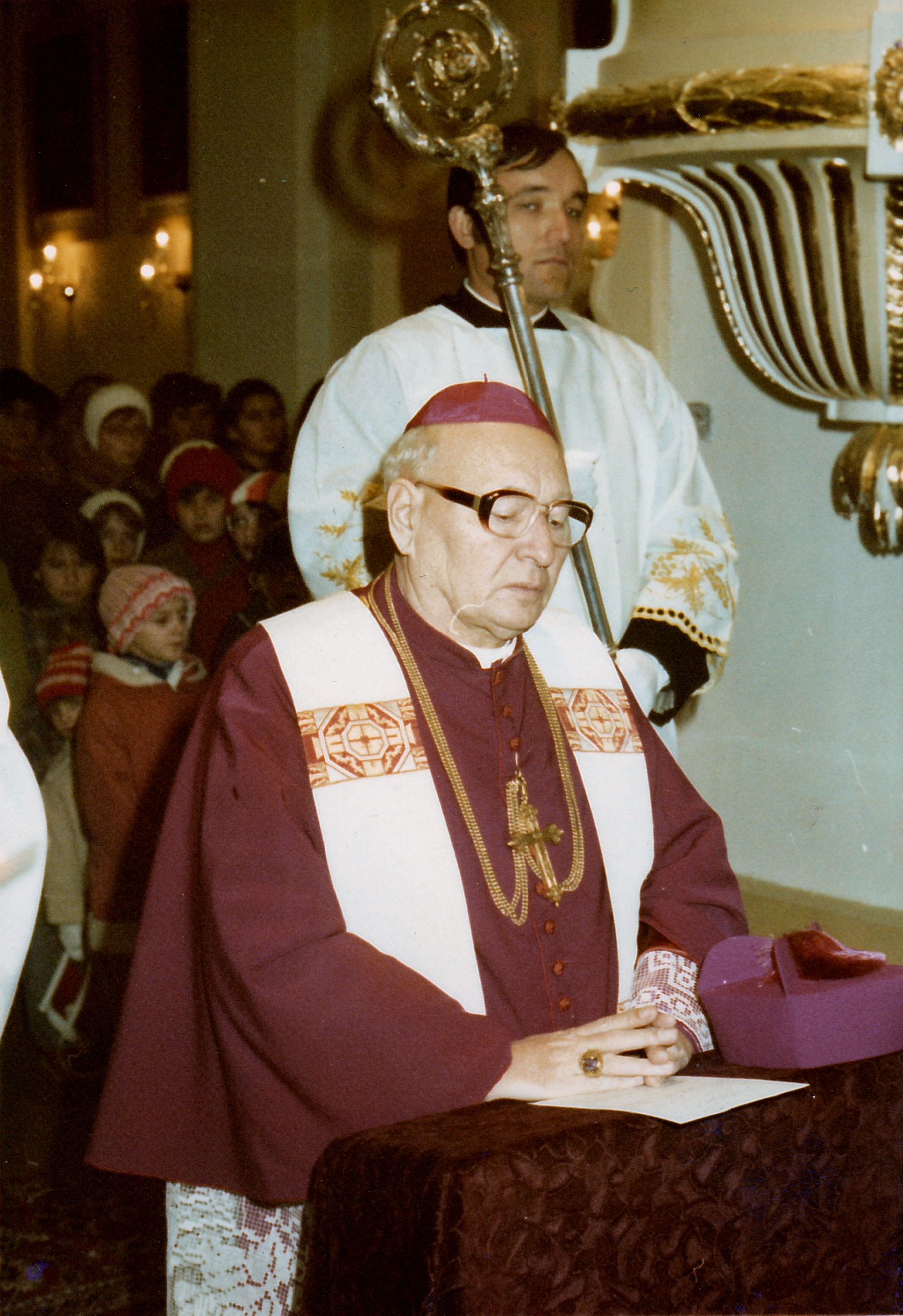
- Archdiocese: Trnava
- Appointed: 19 February 1973
- In office: 3 March 1973 – 13 November 1987
- Predecessor: Ambróz Lazík
- Successor: Ján Sokol

Orders
- Ordination: 26 June 1938 by Pavol Jantausch
- Consecration: 3 March 1973 by Agostino Casaroli

Personal details
- Born: 5 December 1913 Tesárske Mlyňany, Austria-Hungary (now Slovakia)
- Died: 13 November 1987 (aged 73) Trnava, Czechoslovakia
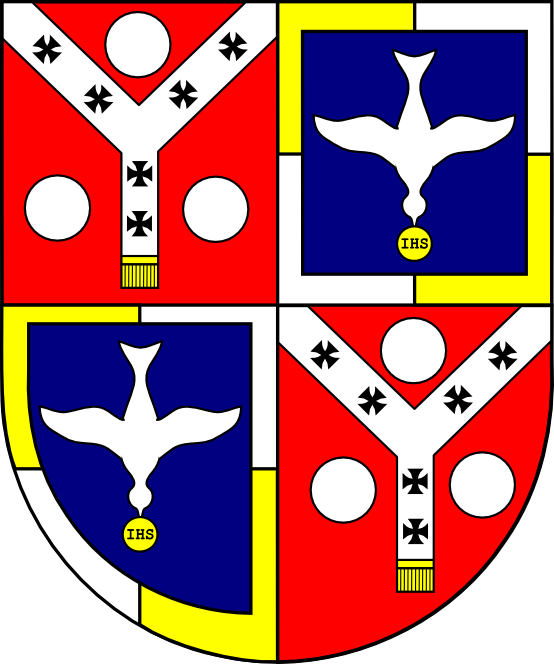
- Coat of arms

Július Gábriš (5 December 1913 in Tesárske Mlyňany – 13 November 1987 in Trnava) was a Slovak Bishop, Apostolic Administrator of Archdiocese of Trnava during communist-controlled Czechoslovakia.

== Biography ==
Born 1913 in Tesárske Mlyňany, he was educated in Zlaté Moravce, Comenius University in Bratislava and at the seminary in Trnava. He was ordained on 26 June 1938 by Pavol Jantausch. He worked as priest in Tekovské Šarluhách, Holíč and Stupava. In 1951 he was promoted to dean in Jablonice, and soon after Nové Mesto nad Váhom.

In 1969 Ambróz Lazík, apostolic administrator of Trnava, died and then Pope Paul VI appointed him as successor. However his appointment was opposed by the communist government of Czechoslovakia and it was only 4 years later, on 3 March 1973, that he was able to receive official consecration which took place in Nitra by Cardinal Casaroli, František Tomášek, and Trochty.
