= Dominik Tóth =

Slovak catholic priest (1925–2015)

Coat of arms of Dominik Tóth

Dominik Tóth (3 August 1925 – 16 May 2015) was a Slovak Catholic bishop.

Born in Kostolný Sek, he was ordained a priest in Trnava and appointed the titular bishop of Ubaba in 1990. Tóth retired as the auxiliary bishop of Bratislava in 2004, and died in 2015.
