= Clemente Faccani =

Italian Roman Catholic prelate

- Titular Archbishop of Serra
- Church: Roman Catholic Church
- See: Titular See of Serra
- In office: 1983–2011

Orders
- Ordination: 10 April 1943

Personal details
- Born: 19 October 1920 Lugo, Italy
- Died: 15 September 2011 (aged 90) Bologna, Italy

Clemente Faccani (19 October 1920 – 15 September 2011) was an Italian prelate of the Catholic Church who worked in the diplomatic service of the Holy See.

== Biography ==
Faccani was born in Lugo, Italy, and was ordained a priest on 10 April 1943. He earned degrees in canon and civil law. To prepare for a diplomatic career he entered the Pontifical Ecclesiastical Academy in 1953.

He entered the diplomatic service of the Holy See in 1955, and his early assignments took him to Guatemala, Costa Rica, China, Belgium, Australia, Papua New Guinea, the United States and Kenya.

Pope John Paul II appointed him titular archbishop of Serra and Apostolic Pro-Nuncio to Kenya, on 27 June 1983. He was consecrated a bishop on 3 September 1983 by Cardinal Agostino Casaroli.

Pope John Paul named him Apostolic Pro-Nuncio to the Seychelles on 7 February 1985.

He was succeeded in the Seychelles when Blasco Francisco Collaço was named Nuncio there on 14 May 1994.

At the age of 74, he retired from his position in Kenya with the appointment of his successor, Giovanni Tonucci, on 9 March 1996.

He lived in a home for retired clergy in Imola. He died in a hospital in Bologna on 15 September 2011.
