= Dubovce =

- Municipality
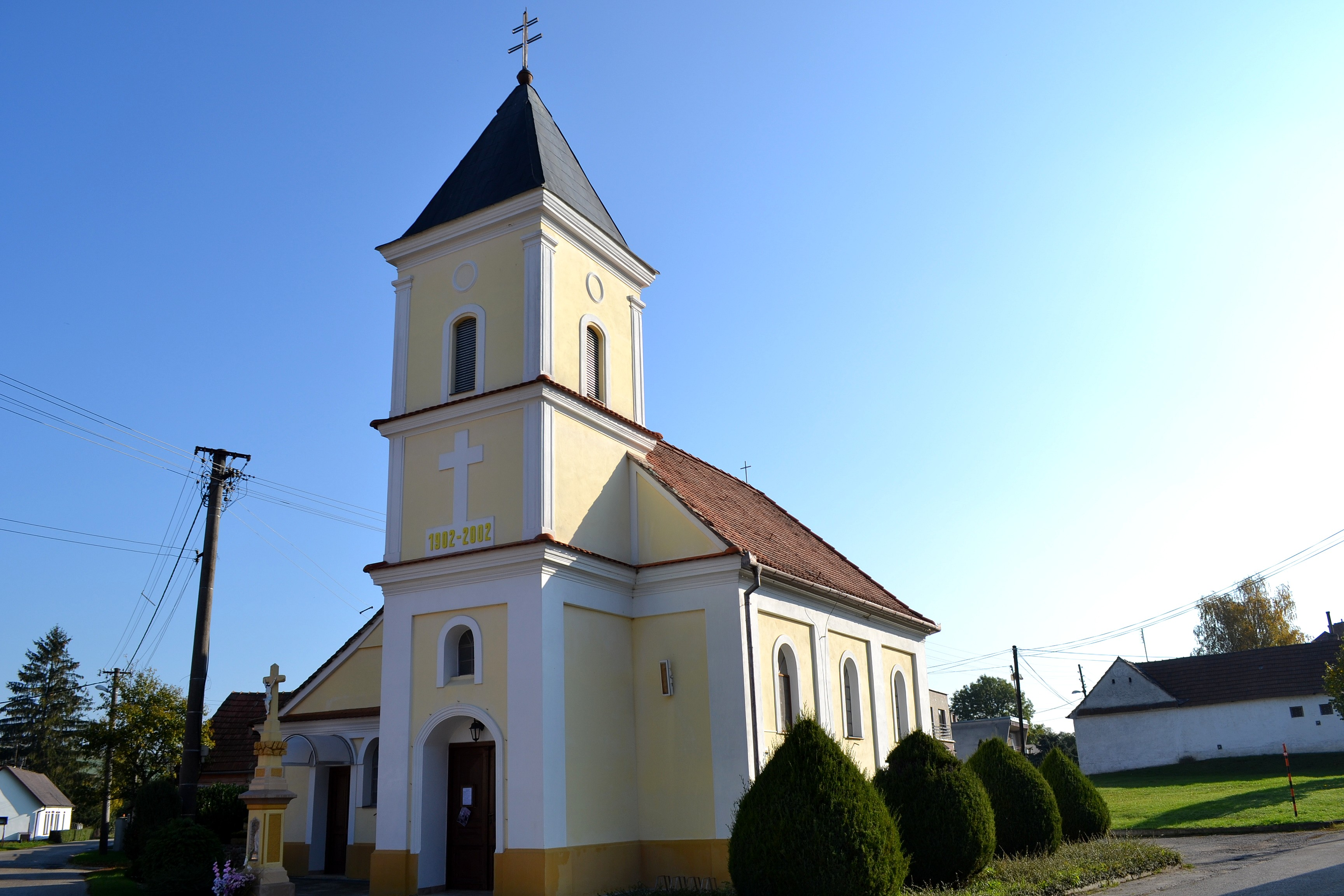
- Church of Saint Anthony of Padua

- Flag

- Location of Dubovce in the Trnava Region Location of Dubovce in Slovakia
- Coordinates: 48.77°N 17.25°E
- Country: Slovakia
- Region: Trnava Region
- District: Skalica District
- First mentioned: 1500

Area
  - Total: 8.45 km^{2} (3.26 sq mi)
- Elevation: 210 m (690 ft)

Population (2025)
  - Total: 623
- Time zone: UTC+1 (CET)
  - Summer (DST): UTC+2 (CEST)
- Postal code: 908 62
- Area code: +421 34
- Vehicle registration plate (until 2022): SI
- Website: dubovce.sk

Dubovce (Hungarian: Farkashelyvidovány) is a village and municipality in Skalica District in the Trnava Region of western Slovakia.

== History ==
In historical records, the village was first mentioned in 1500.

== Geography ==
The municipality lies at an altitude of 210 metres (690 ft) and covers an area of 8.45 km^{2} (3.26 sq mi) (2025).

== Population ==
Population statistic (10 years)
Year	1995	2005	2015	2025
Count	661	675	636	623
Difference		+2.11%	−5.77%	−2.04%

Population statistic
Year	2024	2025
Count	623	623
Difference		+0%

It has a population of 623 people (31 December 2025).

=== Ethnicity ===
Census 2021 (1+ %)
Ethnicity	Number	Fraction
Slovak	591	96.25%
Not found out	22	3.58%
Total	614	

In year 2021 was 614 people by ethnicity 591 as Slovak, 22 as Not found out, 6 as Czech, 2 as Romani, 1 as Hungarian and 1 as French.

Note on population: The difference values of population numbers in the table "Population statistic" and in the sections "Ethnicity" & "Religion" is caused by the use of various statistical methods.

=== Religion ===
Census 2021 (1+ %)
Religion	Number	Fraction
Roman Catholic Church	483	78.66%
None	92	14.98%
Not found out	18	2.93%
Greek Catholic Church	7	1.14%
Evangelical Church	7	1.14%
Total	614	

In year 2021 was 614 people by religion 483 from Roman Catholic Church, 92 from None, 18 from Not found out, 7 from Greek Catholic Church, 7 from Evangelical Church, 2 from Calvinist Church, 2 from Ad hoc movements, 1 from Other and not ascertained christian church, 1 from Christian Congregations in Slovakia and 1 from Other.

== Genealogical resources ==
The records for genealogical research are available at the state archive "Statny Archiv in Bratislava, Slovakia"

== Notable people ==
- Ján Havlík (1928–1965) - martyr

== See also ==
- List of municipalities and towns in Slovakia
