= Róbert Bezák =

Slovak Roman Catholic priest

His Excellency Róbert Bezák C.SS.R.
- Archbishop Emeritus of Trnava
- Church: Roman Catholic
- Archdiocese: Archdiocese of Trnava
- Appointed: April 18, 2009
- Installed: June 6, 2009
- Term ended: July 2, 2012
- Predecessor: Ján Sokol
- Successor: Ján Orosch

Orders
- Ordination: June 14, 1984
- Consecration: June 6, 2009 by Cardinal Jozef Tomko

Personal details
- Born: March 1, 1960 (age 66) Handlová, Czechoslovakia (now Slovakia)
- Coat of arms

Styles of Róbert Bezák
- Reference style: The Most Reverend
- Spoken style: Your Excellency
- Religious style: Monsignor
- Posthumous style: not applicable

Mons. Róbert Bezák, C.SS.R. (born 1 March 1960) is a Slovak Roman Catholic prelate. He was consecrated as Archbishop of Trnava on June 6, 2009, by Cardinal Jozef Tomko.

He was removed from his see on July 2, 2012. Hundreds of Catholics protested at Trnava Cathedral following the decision. Bezák told his congregation that the Holy See had made "serious allegations" against him and barred him from speaking to the media.

In December 2013 Bezák moved to the Redemptorist monastery in the Italian town of Bussolengo near Verona, in Italy.
