= St Martin's Cathedral, Bratislava =

Church in Bratislava, Slovakia

Coordinates: 48°08′31.7″N 17°06′17.2″E

St Martin's Cathedral
- Slovak: Katedrála svätého Martina or Dóm svätého Martina; Hungarian: Szent Márton-dóm or Koronázó templom German: Kathedrale des Heiligen Martin
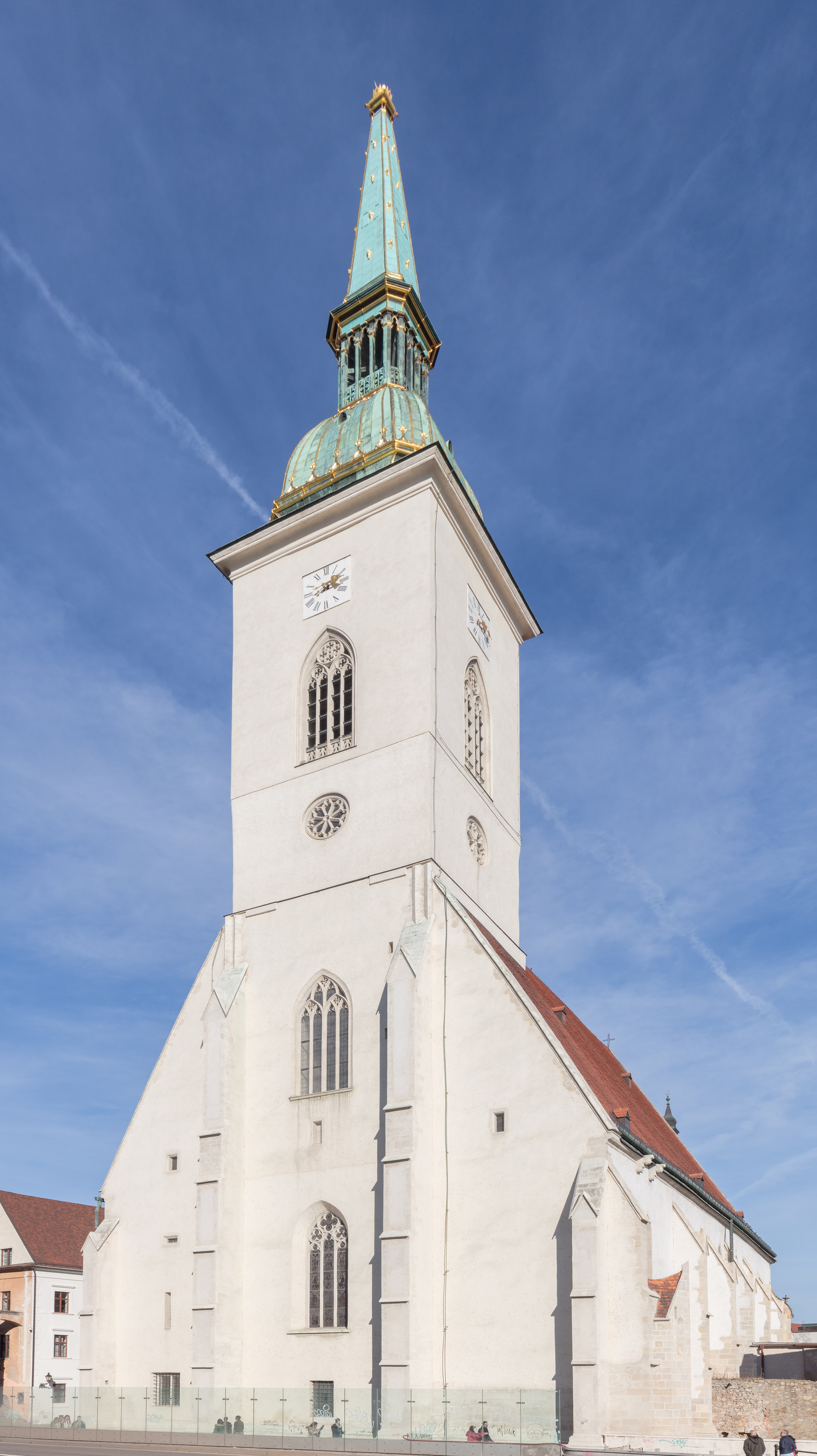
- St Martin's Cathedral
- Location: Old Town, Bratislava
- Address: Dóm sv. Martina; Rudnayovo námestie No. 1
- Country: Slovakia
- Denomination: Roman Catholic Church
- Website: Official website

History
- Status: Cathedral; Coronation church (1563–1830)
- Dedication: Martin of Tours
- Consecrated: 1452

Architecture
- Functional status: Active
- Heritage designation: Cultural Heritage Monument of Slovakia
- Designated: 11 November 2002
- Architectural type: Fortified church
- Style: Gothic

Administration
- Archdiocese: Bratislava

Recording of the Cathedral's Wederin bell from 1935

St Martin's Cathedral (Slovak: Katedrála svätého Martina or Dóm svätého Martina, Hungarian: Szent Márton-dóm or Koronázó templom, German: Kathedrale des Heiligen Martin) is a church in Bratislava, Slovakia, and the cathedral of the Archdiocese of Bratislava.

It is situated at the western border of the historical city center below Bratislava Castle. It is the largest and one of the oldest churches in Bratislava, known especially for being the coronation church of the Kingdom of Hungary between 1563 and 1830.

Together with the castle on the hill adjacent, and somewhat similar in its striking, but fairly stark Gothic lines and colouring, St Martin's tower and spire, at 85 metres (278 ft 10 in), dominates Old Town's skyline. The tower virtually formed a part of the town's fortifications, built as it was into the city's defensive walls.

As with the castle, the surroundings of St Martin's are as memorable as the structure itself. In the cathedral's case, this includes the picturesque remains of outbuildings in a spacious staired courtyard, and a working seminary with robed students on a cobblestone side-street.

A small but significant neighbour of the cathedral is a monument to the synagogue, which stood next door for centuries until the Communist government demolished it around 1970 to make room for a new bridge, Nový Most. The cathedral contains the remains of Saint John the Merciful who died in the early 7th century.

== Structure, shape and characteristics ==
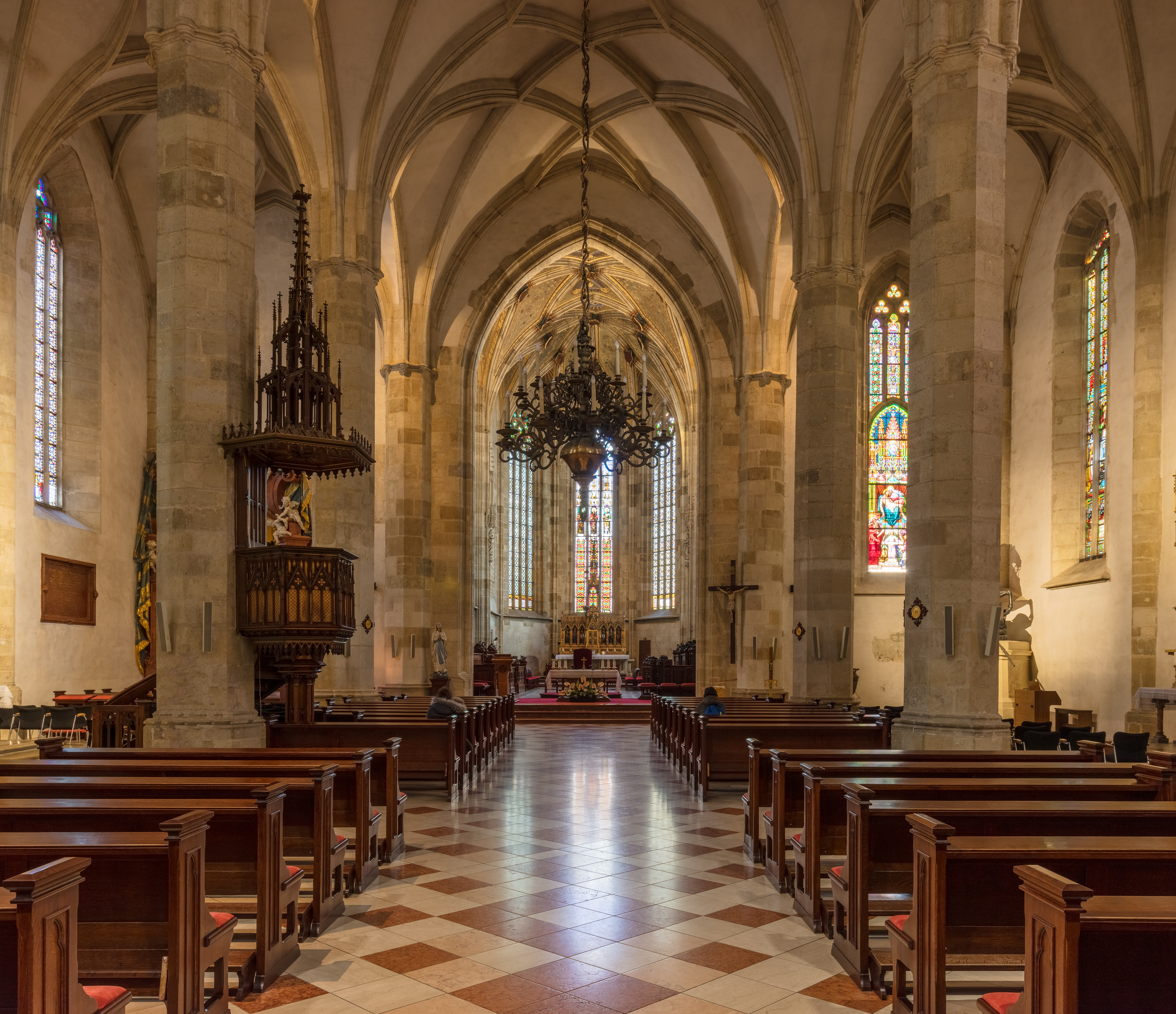
General view of the interior

The nave of the structure consists of three aisles divided by two rows of eight columns. The nave is 69.37 metres (227 ft 7 in) by 22.85 metres (75 ft 0 in) with a maximum height of 16.02 m (52.6 ft). The tower is 85 metres (278 ft 10 in) high and at one time was part of the medieval city fortifications. The cathedral is constructed as traditional cruciform basilica.

Together with the castle on the hill adjacent, and somewhat similar in its striking but fairly stark Gothic lines and colouring, St Martin's spire dominates Old Town's skyline.

As with the castle, the surroundings of St Martin's are as memorable as the structure itself. The cathedral sits amid picturesque remains of outbuildings in a spacious stepped courtyard, and a working seminary with robed students on a cobblestoned side-street. The spire is capped by a replica of the Hungarian Crown resting on a gilded pillow.

The altar is dominated by an equestrian statue group depicting St Martin in a typical Hungarian hussar dress. The saint is dividing his cloak to give part to a beggar as protection from the cold.

== Construction history ==
Long before the construction of the cathedral, the site had been the crossroads and contained the former centre of the town, a market and probably also a chapel. Worship services were held at Bratislava Castle, where the chapter and provost's office had their seat. As the visits became less bearable and the castle's safety was threatened, King Emeric of Hungary requested the Pope Innocent III for permission to relocate the provost's office into forecastle, and the pope assented in 1204. The church was relocated in 1221, and was originally built in Romanesque style and dedicated to the Holy Saviour.

As the town grew into a city and received additional privileges in 1291, the sanctuary became insufficient for its needs. Construction of a new Gothic cathedral began in 1311 on the site of the earlier church and an adjacent cemetery.

Construction continued until 1452 due to the difficulty of construction and lack of funding. For a period in the early fifteenth century, construction halted due to the Hussite Wars. In 1452, the church was finally completed and consecrated, however, work continued until the sixteenth century. During this period, a new long presbytery and the Gothic chapels of Czech Queen Sofia and of Saint Anne were added in the 15th century.

Eighteenth century additions to the sanctuary include the Baroque Chapel of John the Merciful, and serves as a mausoleum. It was constructed at the price of 2000 pieces of gold at the expense of Cardinal Emeric Esterházy and the famous Baroque equestrian sculpture of St Martin was added in 1744. Both works were designed by Georg Rafael Donner.

In 1760, the top of the Gothic tower was struck by lightning and later replaced by a Baroque one, which was subsequently destroyed by fire in 1835 and reconstructed in 1847 (with some modifications), and topped by the crown of St Stephen (see below).

The church attained its present-day appearance during the period 1869 to 1877, when it was re-Gothicised after suffering damage by fire, war, earthquake and other disasters.

== Coronations ==
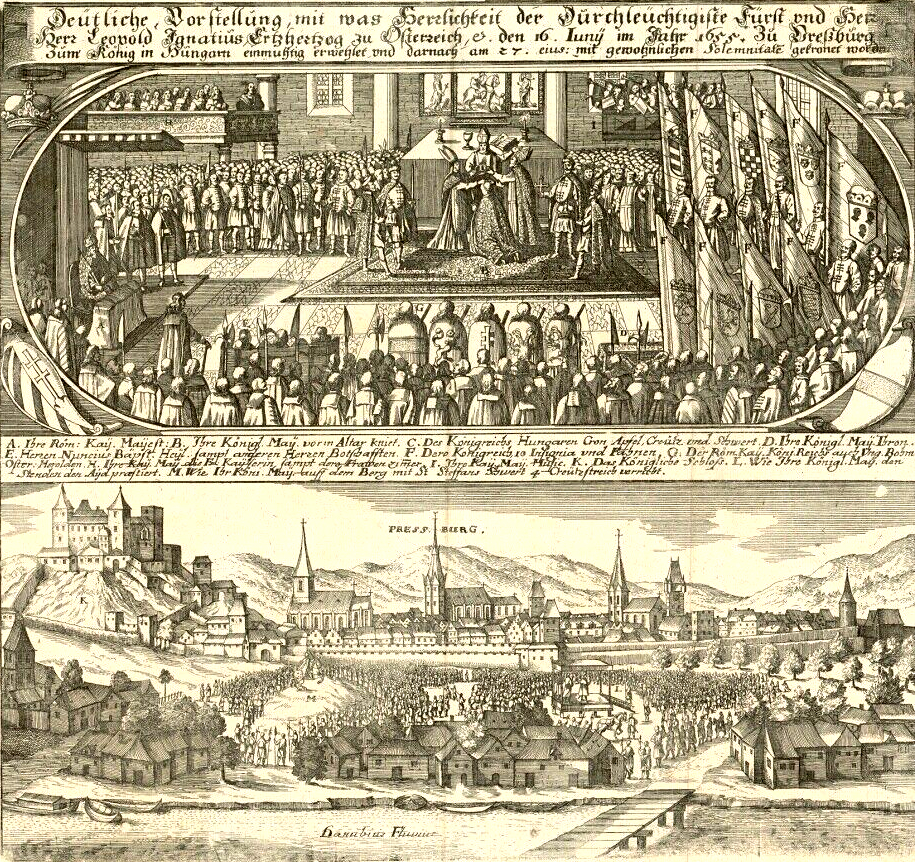
Coronation of Emperor Leopold I at St. Martin's Cathedral, 1655

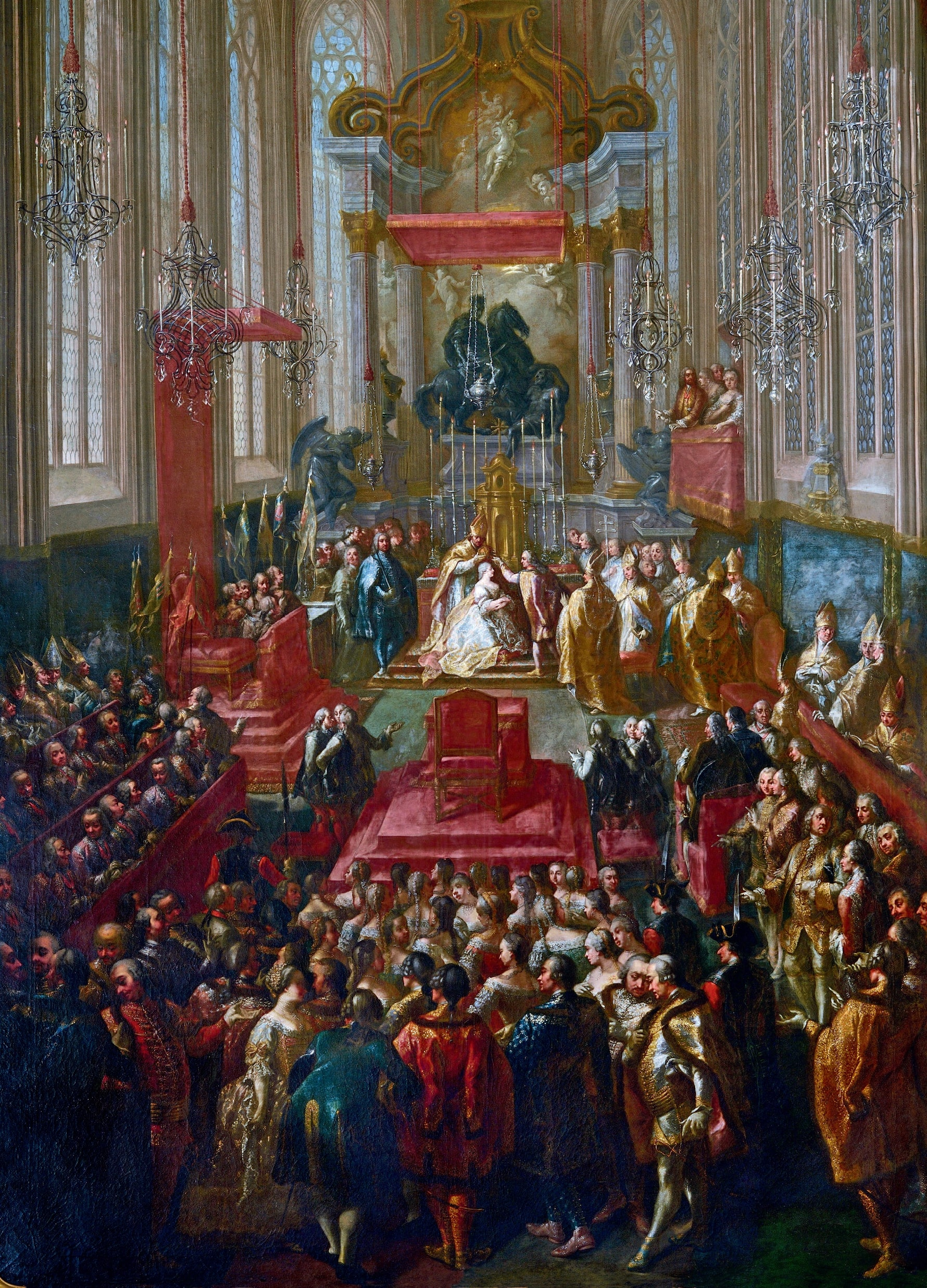
Coronation of Queen Maria II Theresa, 1741

The cathedral became the coronation church of the sovereigns of the Kingdom of Hungary in 1563, succeeding the Basilica of the Assumption of the Blessed Virgin Mary in Székesfehérvár, after the Ottoman Empire conquered that city. On 8 September 1563, the Crown of St Stephen was placed on the head of Maximilian II, son of Emperor Ferdinand I of Habsburg. In total, the coronations of eleven kings and queens, plus eight of their consorts occurred here between 1563 and 1830, including Maria Theresa of Austria.

List of crowned kings/queens and of their consorts, with dates in parentheses:

- Maximilian II (8 September 1563)
- Maria, wife of Maximilian II (9 September 1563)
- Rudolf II (25 September 1572)
- Matthias (19 November 1608)
- Anna, wife of Matthias (25 March 1613)
- Ferdinand II (1 July 1618)
- Eleonore, second wife of Ferdinand II (26 July 1622)
- Maria Anna, first wife of Ferdinand III (14 February 1638)
- Ferdinand IV (16 June 1647)
- Eleanor, third wife of Ferdinand III (6 June 1655)
- Leopold I (27 June 1655)
- Joseph I (9 December 1687)
- Charles III (22 May 1712)
- Elisabeth Christine, wife of Charles III (18 October 1714)
- Maria Theresa (25 June 1741)
- Leopold II (15 November 1790)
- Maria Ludovika, third wife of Francis I (7 September 1808)
- Caroline Augusta, fourth wife of Francis I (25 September 1825)
- Ferdinand V (28 September 1830)

== Crown of St Stephen ==
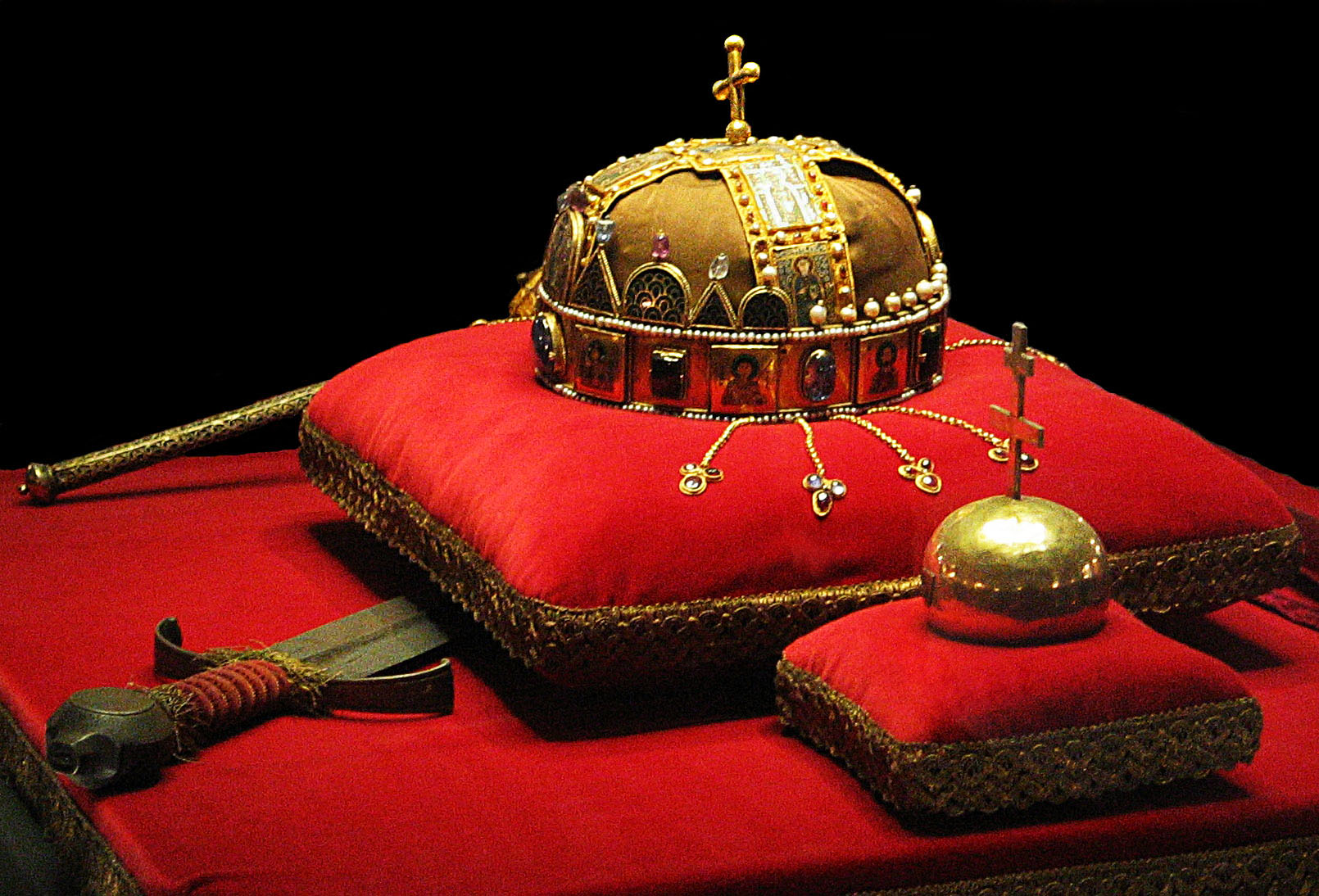
Crown of St. Stephen

The tower is topped by a gold-plated replica of the Crown of St Stephen. It was placed in 1847 following restoration of the damaged tower, to commemorate the cathedral's importance as a coronation church. It weighs 150 kilograms (330 lb 11 oz), measures over 1 metre (3 ft 3 in) in diameter, and rests on a 1.2 metres (3 ft 11 in) by 1.2 metres (3 ft 11 in) gold-plated pillow and stands 1.64 metres (5 ft 5 in) high. The pillow and crown contain a total of 8 kilograms (17 lb 10 oz) of gold and were restored in August 2010.

== Catacombs, crypts and sepulchres ==
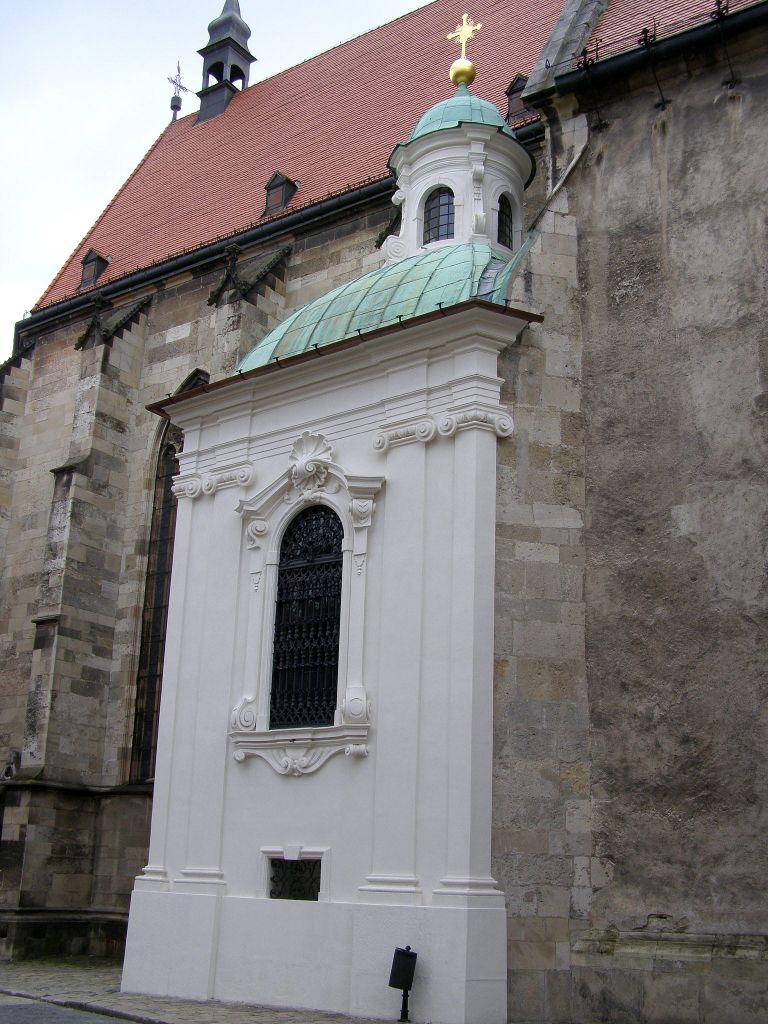
Chapel of Saint John the Merciful

Since the cathedral was built over a cemetery, it contains catacombs of unknown length and crypts holding the sepulchres of many significant historical figures, up to 6 metres (19 ft 8 in) below the church. To date, three crypts are known:

- Pálffy family crypt (Hungarian: A Pálffy család kriptája) is located under the main altar (sanctuary) and is accessed from the exterior. Entrance to this crypt is at the northern side of the cathedral and is covered by a white marble slab bearing the coat of arms of the Pálffy family. Above is a funeral sculpture by Ján Draškovch from the year 1613, depicting a knight in armour and a sea shell. The Pálffy family was notable in Bratislava as they were the hereditary owners of the Bratislava Castle.
- Jesuit crypt (Hungarian: A jezsuiták kriptája) is accessible from chapel of Saint Anne and is located under the road between the cathedral and the adjacent seminary.
- Archbishop's crypt (Hungarian: Érseki kripta) is accessible from the chapel of Saint Anne and is the only crypt open to the public. It branches into four hallways under the nave in the direction of Kapitulská Street and contains over 90 graves.

Over the centuries, the cathedral's sepulchres filled with many significant figures, such as ecclesiastic dignitaries, presidents of the historic Pozsony county as well as Jozef Ignác Bajza, the author of the first novel in Slovak, but also with dozens of bishops, canons, French priests fleeing the French Revolution and many people outside the Catholic Church.

== Present ==
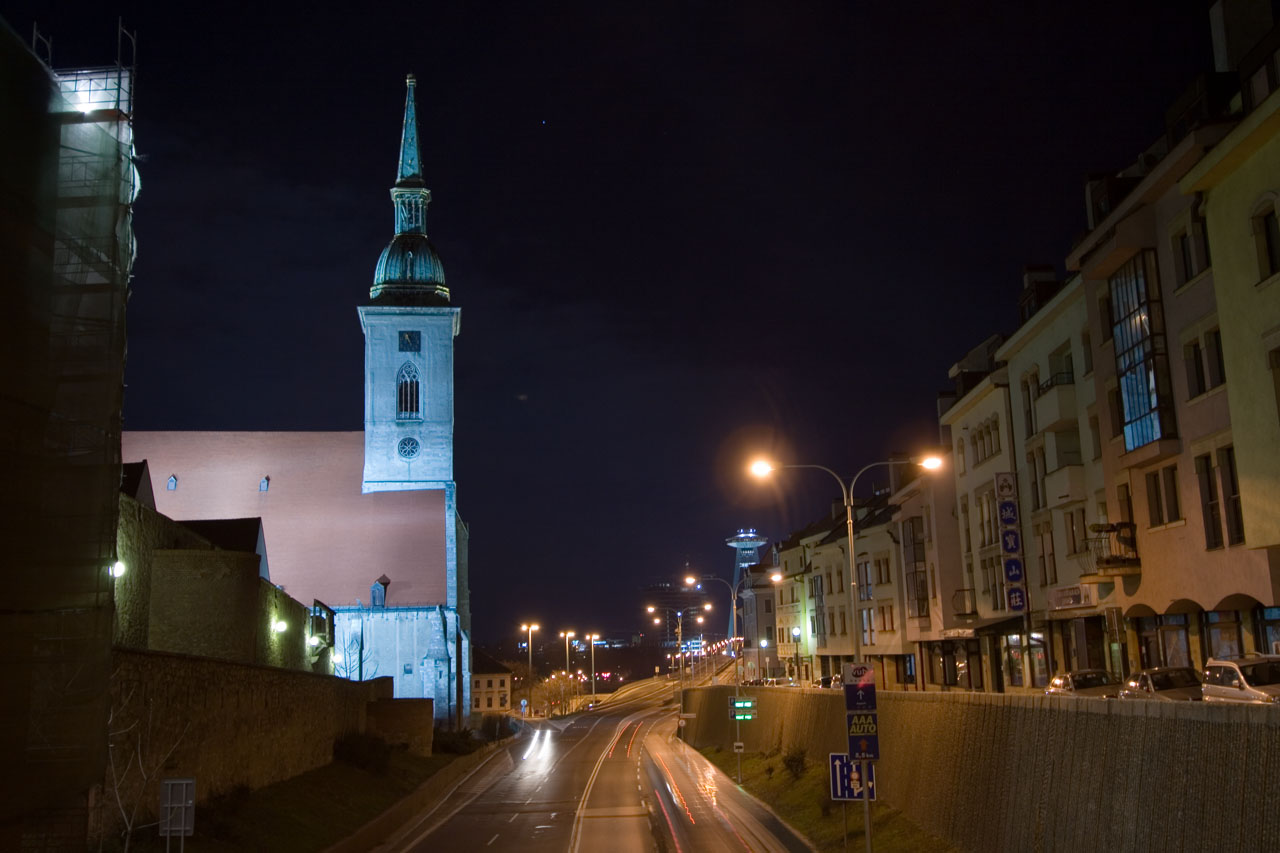
Night shot of the cathedral, looking towards Nový Most and Petržalka

Today, the church is deteriorating due to vibrations caused by heavy traffic on the access ramp to the nearby Nový Most. Restoration efforts began in 1997 and the cathedral has been a national cultural monument since 11 November 2002.

Since 2003, it has hosted the Korunovačné slávnosti (Coronation Feasts) festival which re-enacts the coronation of one of the monarchs crowned in the cathedral. From 1995 to February 2008 it was the co-cathedral of the Archdiocese of Bratislava-Trnava.

== Additional information ==
Video and Photo of reconstruction of gold-plated representation of the Crown of St Stephen (in Slovak).

== Picture gallery ==
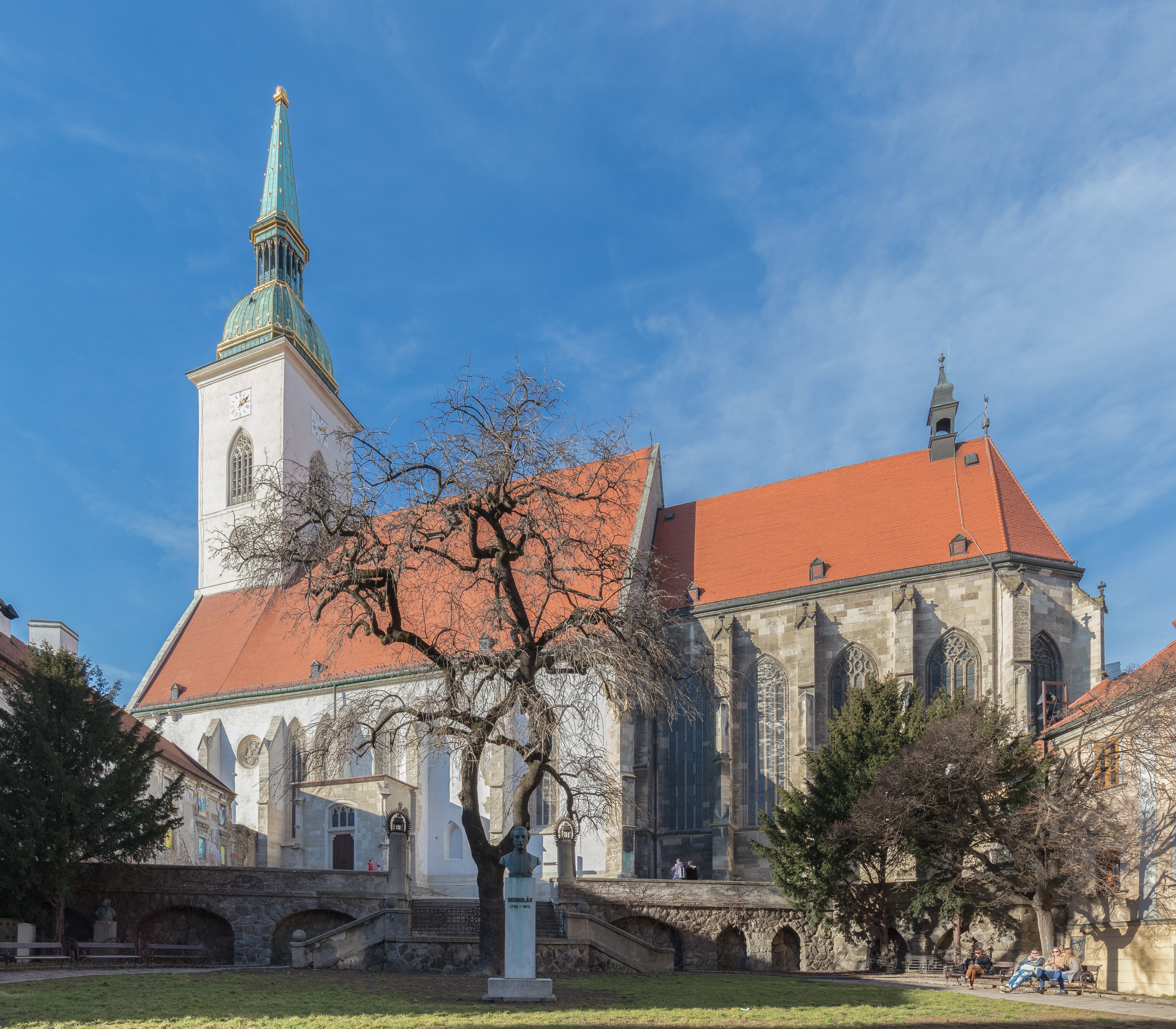
View of the whole building

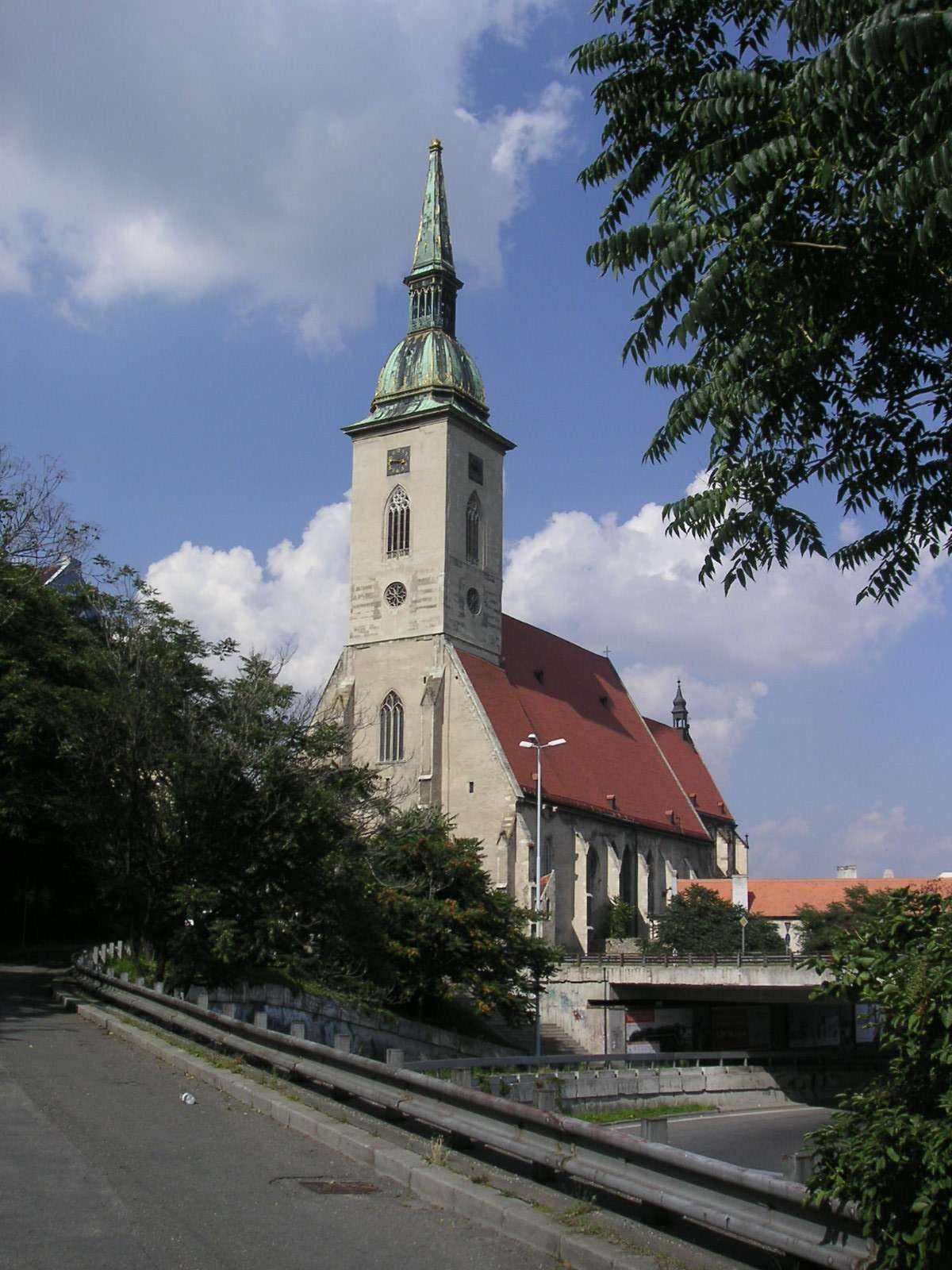
Front view of the cathedral

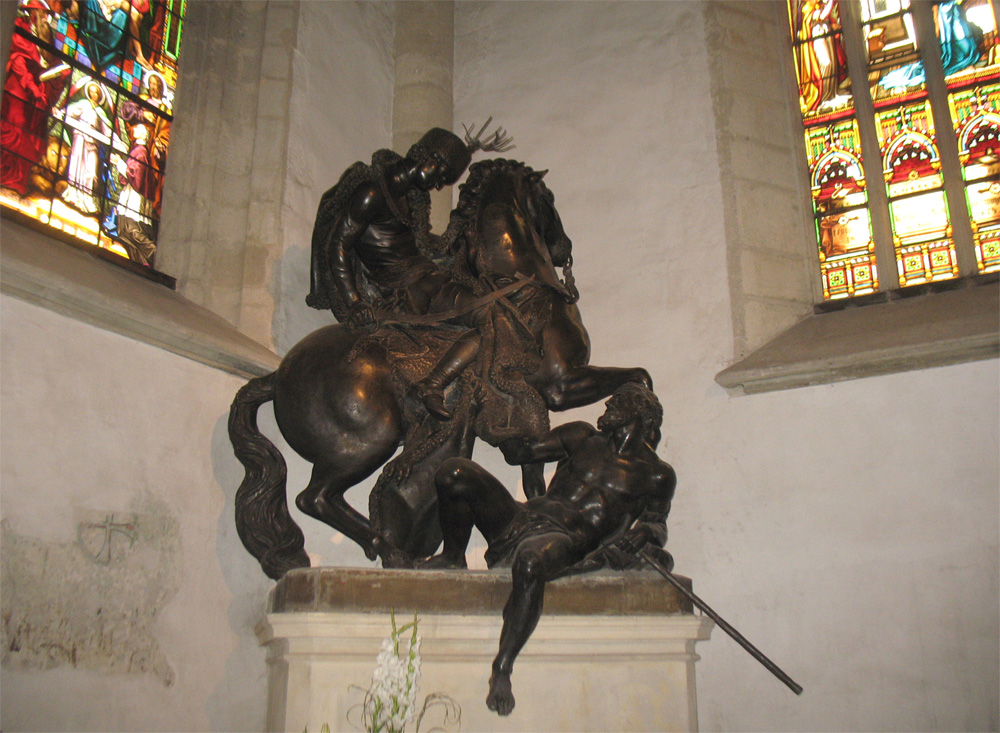
Statue of Saint Martin

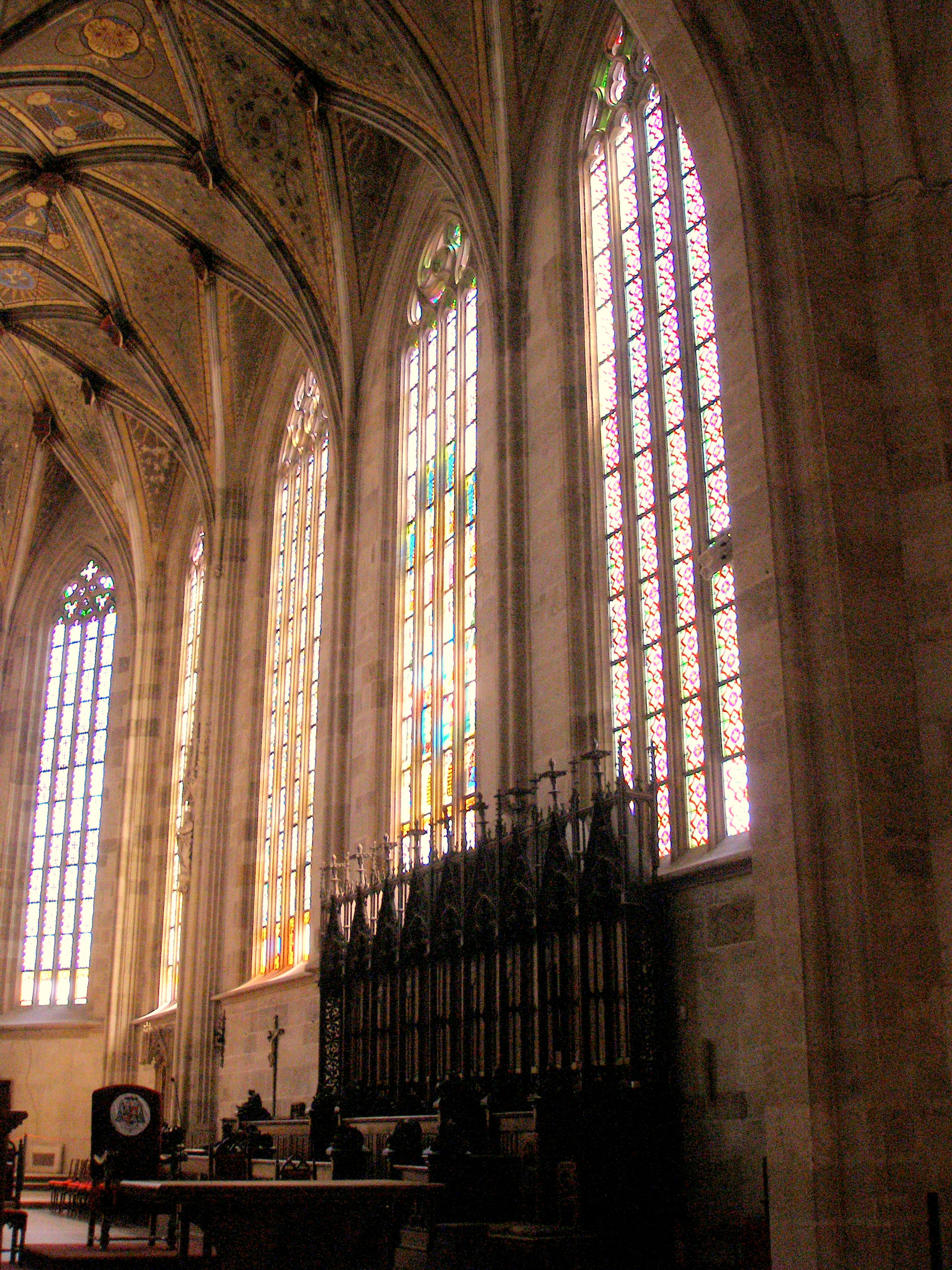
Interior of the cathedral

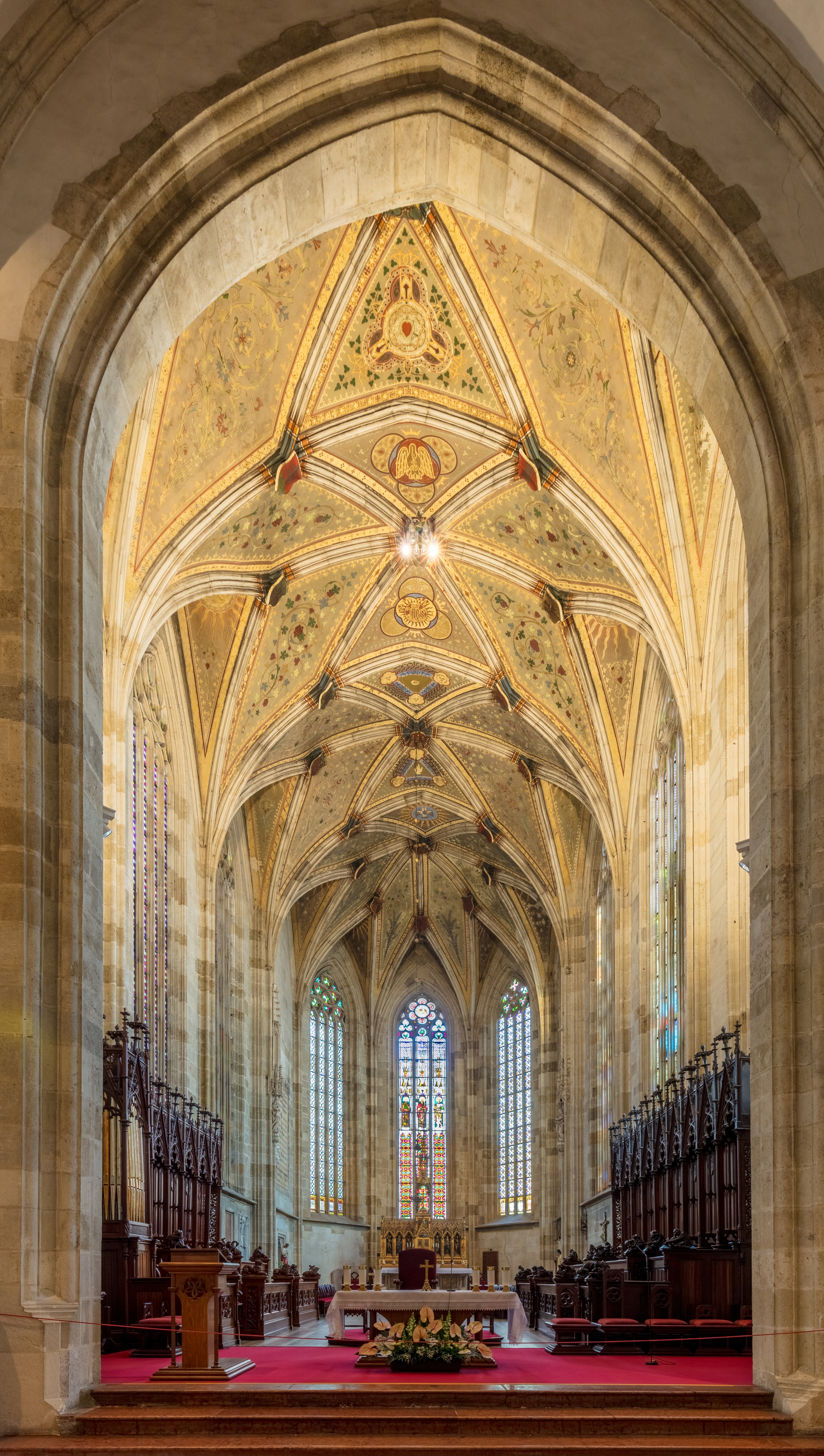
High altar

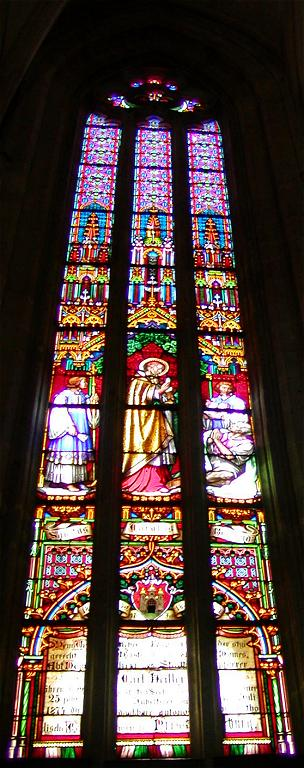
Stained glass window

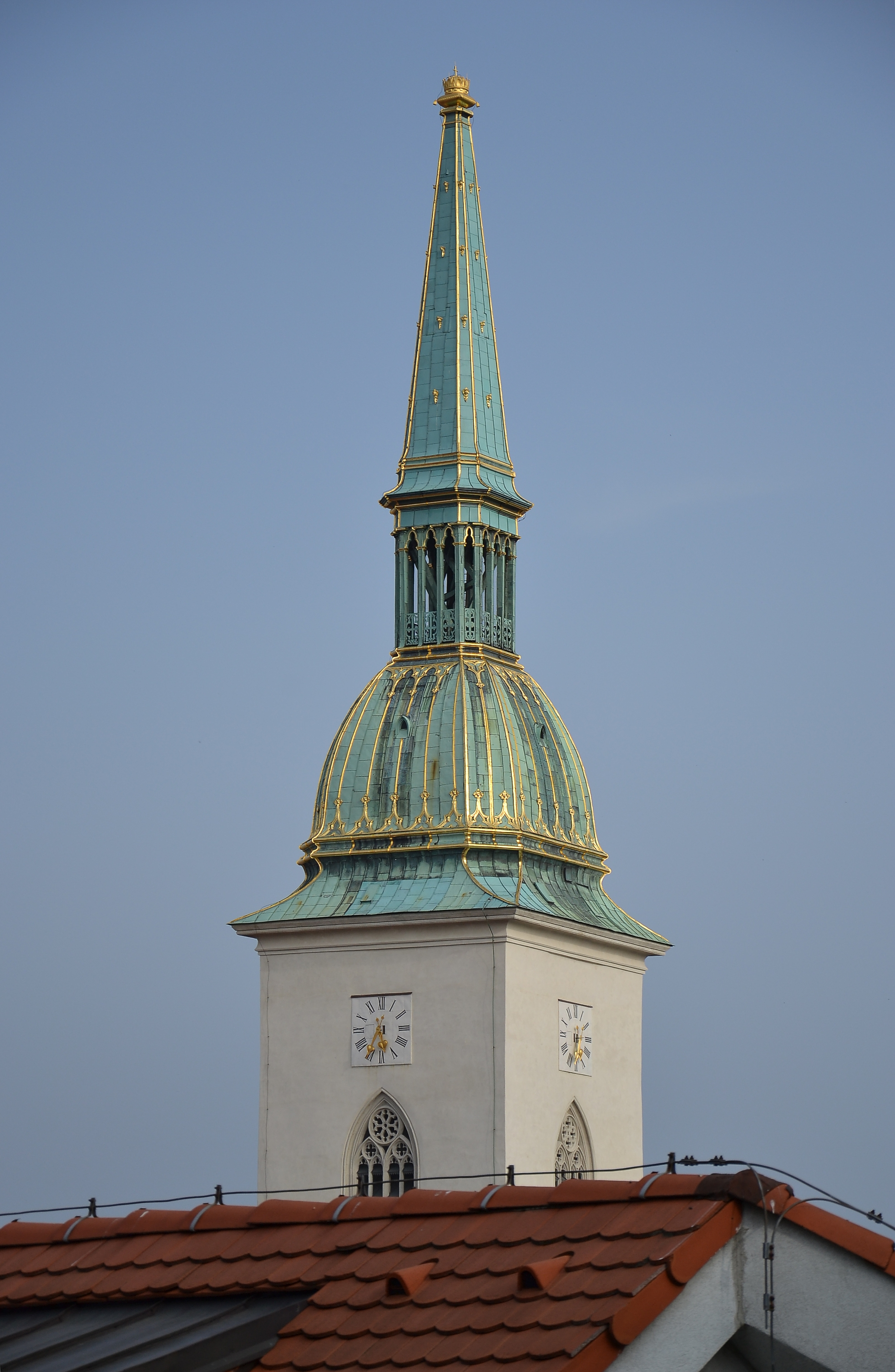
Cathedral tower and spire

== See also ==
- List of cathedrals in Slovakia
