= St. John the Baptist Cathedral (Trnava) =

Cathedral of St John the Baptist
- The Metropolitan Cathedral of St John the Baptist
- Katedrála svätého Jána Krstiteľa
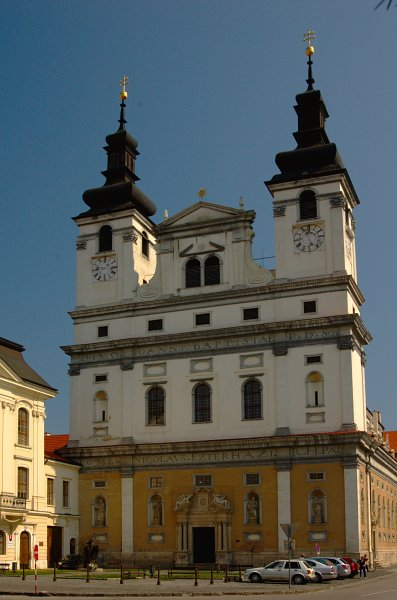

- Location in Slovakia
- 48°22′50″N 17°35′18″E
- Location: Trnava
- Country: Slovakia
- Denomination: Roman Catholic

History
- Status: Active
- Dedication: St John the Baptist
- Consecrated: 1637

Architecture
- Functional status: Cathedral

Administration
- Archdiocese: Trnava

Clergy
- Archbishop: Ján Orosch

St. John the Baptist Cathedral (Slovak: Katedrála svätého Jána Krstiteľa, Hungarian: Keresztelő Szent János székesegyház) is one of the most significant historic monuments of Trnava, western Slovakia.

== History ==
The Cathedral is the first purely Baroque building built in present-day Slovakia. It is part of a complex of academical buildings of a university (now Pázmány Péter Catholic University and Eötvös Loránd University, in Budapest since 1777) founded in 1635 by cardinal Péter Pázmány. The donor of this Cathedral, Miklós Eszterházy, entrusted its construction to the Italian masters Antonio and Pietro Spazzi in 1629. The not-yet-finished cathedral was consecrated in 1637.

The single-nave two-tower Cathedral with straight seal of sanctuary has a west aspect and is about 61 metres (200 ft) in length and 28 metres (92 ft) in width. Above its main portal there is a shield with figures of seated angels and the stoned crest of the Esterházy family.

The interior of the Cathedral amazes a visitor with its massiveness and variety of unique paintings. The main area has barrel vaults with lunettes, while in the chapels on both sides of nave can be found cloister vaults.

The biggest treasure of the whole interior is the colossal main altar which was finished in 1640. On its realisation participated besides the Austrian master B. Knilling and V. Knoth also V. Stadler from Trnava and master Ferdinand from Cífer. The altar is 20.3 metres (67 ft) high and 14.8 metres (49 ft) wide and is one of the biggest altars of its kind in Europe.

The painters and stuccoer's decoration of the interior is the work of artists G. B. Rossa, G. Tornini and P. Conti. The ceiling’s paintings are by the north Italian painters F. I. Grafenstein and C. Ricchi (Source Dr. Medvecky, 2008).

The church doesn’t hold only spiritual functions; there were many theological treatises and graduations. Very interesting also are the catacombs with graves.

In December 1978 Pope John Paul II established the church as the Cathedral of the Archdiocese of Trnava. The name of the archdiocese was changed in 1995 to the Archdiocese of Bratislava-Trnava and in 2008 changed back to Archdiocese of Trnava when the territory was split between two archdioceses. Pope John Paul II visited the cathedral on November 9, 2003.

== See also ==
- List of cathedrals in Slovakia
- List of Jesuit sites
