= Jacovce =

Municipality in Slovakia

Jacovce Jác
- Municipality
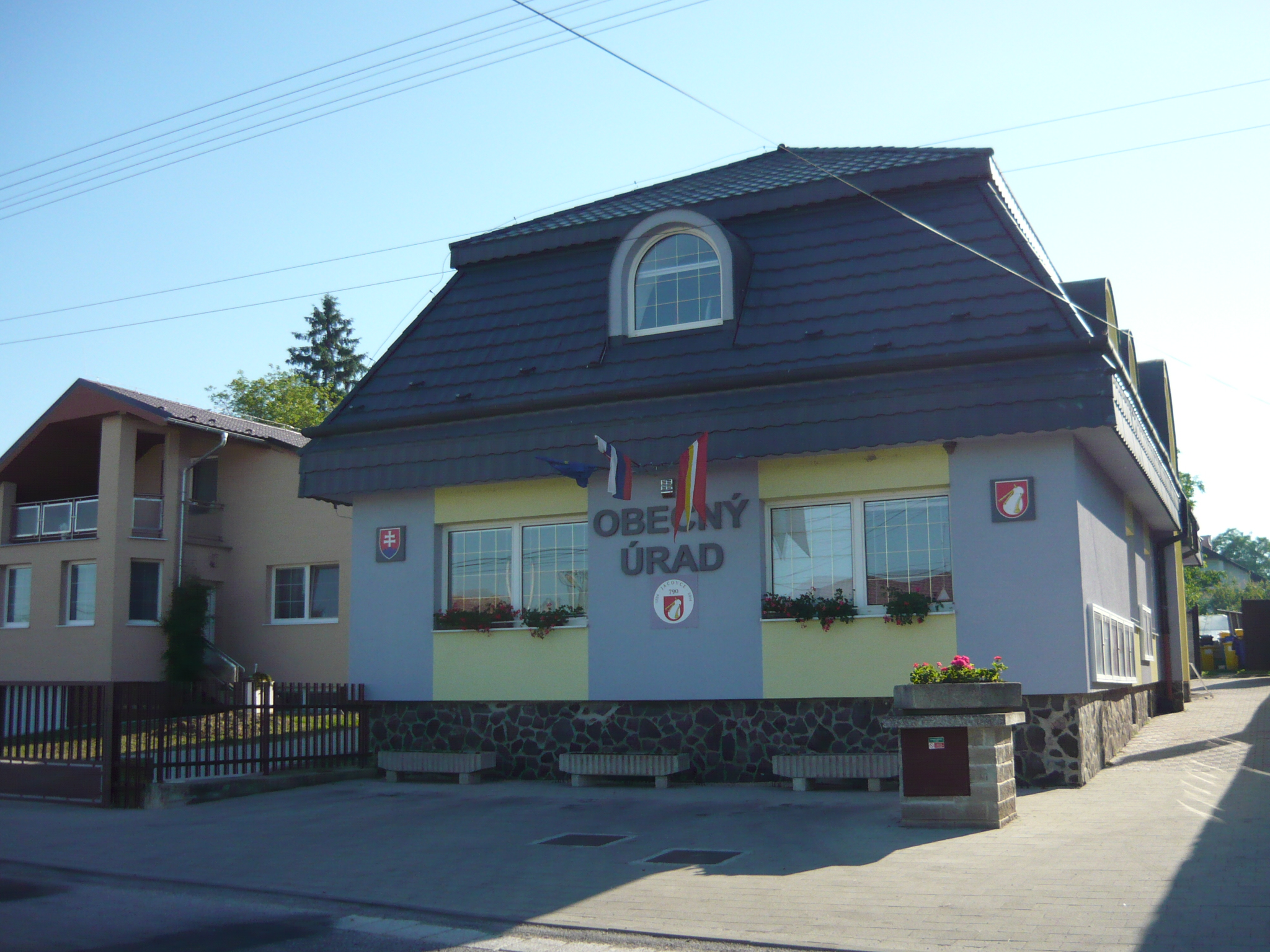
- Municipal office

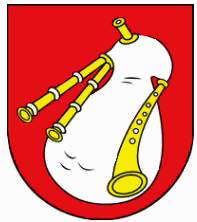
- Flag Coat of arms

- Location of Jacovce in the Nitra Region Location of Jacovce in Slovakia
- Coordinates: 48.58°N 18.15°E
- Country: Slovakia
- Region: Nitra Region
- District: Topoľčany District
- First mentioned: 1255

Area
  - Total: 10.06 km^{2} (3.88 sq mi)
- Elevation: 193 m (633 ft)

Population (2025)
  - Total: 1,756
- Time zone: UTC+1 (CET)
  - Summer (DST): UTC+2 (CEST)
- Postal code: 956 21
- Area code: +421 38
- Vehicle registration plate (until 2022): TO
- Website: www.obecjacovce.sk

Jacovce (Hungarian: Jác) is a municipality in the Topoľčany District of the Nitra Region, Slovakia. In 2011 it had 1770 inhabitants. Jacovce is a birthplace of Slovak ice-hockey star Miro Šatan.

== Geography ==
The municipality lies at an altitude of 193 metres (633 ft) and covers an area of 10.06 km^{2} (3.88 sq mi) (2025).

== Population ==
Population statistic (10 years)
| Year | 1995 | 2005 | 2015 | 2025 |
|---|---|---|---|---|
| Count | 1809 | 1814 | 1755 | 1756 |
| Difference | | +0.27% | −3.25% | +0.05% |

Population statistic
| Year | 2024 | 2025 |
|---|---|---|
| Count | 1770 | 1756 |
| Difference | | −0.79% |

It has a population of 1756 people (31 December 2025).

=== Ethnicity ===
Census 2021 (1+ %)
| Ethnicity | Number | Fraction |
|---|---|---|
| Slovak | 1745 | 96.67% |
| Not found out | 45 | 2.49% |
| Total | 1805 | |

In year 2021 was 1805 people by ethnicity 1745 as Slovak, 45 as Not found out, 13 as Other, 12 as Czech, 5 as Russian, 3 as Ukrainian, 3 as Hungarian, 2 as German, 1 as Jewish, 1 as Irish, 1 as Italian, 1 as Rusyn, 1 as Austrian and 1 as Albanian.

Note on population: The difference values of population numbers in the table "Population statistic" and in the sections "Ethnicity" & "Religion" is caused by the use of various statistical methods.

=== Religion ===
Census 2021 (1+ %)
| Religion | Number | Fraction |
|---|---|---|
| Roman Catholic Church | 1408 | 78.01% |
| None | 256 | 14.18% |
| Not found out | 68 | 3.77% |
| Evangelical Church | 30 | 1.66% |
| Total | 1805 | |

In year 2021 was 1805 people by religion 1408 from Roman Catholic Church, 256 from None, 68 from Not found out, 30 from Evangelical Church, 9 from Apostolic Church, 7 from Christian Congregations in Slovakia, 5 from Ad hoc movements, 4 from Greek Catholic Church, 3 from Eastern Orthodox Church, 3 from Islam, 2 from Paganism and natural spirituality, 2 from Other, 2 from Seventh-day Adventist Church, 2 from Buddhism, 1 from Calvinist Church, 1 from Other and not ascertained christian church, 1 from Hinduism and 1 from Baptists Church.

== Notable people ==
- Ladislav Jurkemik, football player and manager

== See also ==
- List of municipalities and towns in Slovakia

== Genealogical resources ==
The records for genealogical research are available at the state archive "Statny Archiv in Nitra, Slovakia"
