= Pavol Jantausch =

- Apostolic Administrator of Trnava
- Church: Catholic Church
- See: Apostolic Administration of Trnava
- In office: 29 May 1922 – 29 June 1947
- Predecessor: Apostolic Administration began
- Successor: Ambróz Lazík
- Other post: Titular Bishop of Priene (1925-1947)

Orders
- Ordination: 21 September 1893
- Consecration: 14 June 1925 by Karol Kmeťko

Personal details
- Born: 27 June 1870 Verbó, Nyitra County, Transleithania, Austria-Hungary
- Died: 29 June 1947 (aged 77) Trnava, Slovak Region, Czechoslovak Republic
- Motto: Pro Veritate Cum Caritate

Pavol Jantausch (27 June 1870 – 29 June 1947) was a Slovak priest and Bishop of the Roman Catholic Church. During World War II, he protested the antisemitic policies of the Nazi aligned Slovak Republic (1939–1945).

== Biography ==
Born in Vrbové in 1870, he was ordained a priest in 1893. In 1922 he was appointed Apostolic Administrator of Trnava and in 1925 he was ordained Titular Bishop of Priene.

Following Adolf Hitler's dismemberment of Czechoslovakia prior to the Second World War, the small and predominantly Catholic and agricultural Slovak region became the Fascist Slovak Republic in 1939, a nominally independent Nazi puppet state. In February 1942, Slovakia agreed to begin deportations of Jews to German concentration camps. Distressing scenes at railway yards of deportees being beaten by Hlinka Guard paramilitary spurred community protest, including from Bishop Pavol Jantausch. Jantausch was active in protecting Jews.

== See also ==
- Catholic resistance to Nazism
