= Ján Sokol (bishop) =

Slovak archbishop (born 1933)

His Excellency Ján Sokol
- Archbishop Emeritus of Trnava
- Church: Roman Catholic
- Archdiocese: Archdiocese of Trnava
- Appointed: May 19, 1988
- Installed: June 12, 1988
- Term ended: April 18, 2009
- Successor: Róbert Bezák

Orders
- Ordination: June 23, 1957
- Consecration: June 12, 1988 by Francesco Colasuonno

Personal details
- Born: October 9, 1933 (age 92) Jacovce, Czechoslovakia (now Slovakia)
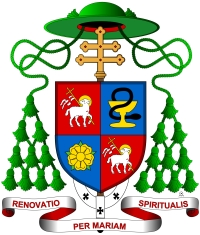
- Coat of arms

Ján Sokol (born 9 October 1933) is a Slovak archbishop and former Archbishop of Trnava and Bratislava.

Styles of Ján Sokol
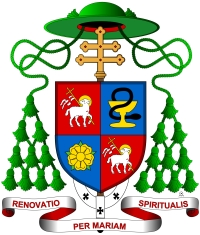
- Reference style: The Most Reverend
- Spoken style: Your Excellency
- Religious style: Monsignor
- Posthumous style: not applicable

== Life ==
Sokol was born in Jacovce, Topoľčany District. He studied at a grammar school in Topoľčany and studied theology and philosophy in Bratislava, before being ordained as a priest in 1957. He was subsequently a chaplain in Šurany (1957–58), Levice (1958–60), Bratislava-Nové Mesto (1960–66) and Štúrovo (1966–68). From 1968 to 1970 he was a prefect at a Catholic seminary in Bratislava, before working again as a chaplain in Sereď in 1970–71, and was a dean there until 1975.

He was appointed Apostolic Administrator of the Archdiocese of Trnava in 1987, and appointed as a titular bishop of Luni in May 1988 and consecrated bishop in June 1988 in the St. John the Baptist Cathedral in Trnava. He became Archbishop of Trnava in 1989 and Archbishop of Bratislava and Trnava in 1995.

On 14 February 2008, Pope Benedict XVI appointed him as the Archbishop of the newly reformed Archdiocese of Trnava, which remained an Archdiocesis despite no longer being metropolitan. In accordance with the canon law, upon reaching 75 years of age, he requested to be released from his office. Pope Benedict XVI named Róbert Bezák as his successor on 18 April 2009.

== Controversy ==
Ján Sokol is listed as having cooperated with the former Communist Czechoslovak secret police, according to the documents from Ústav pamäti národa (ÚPN, Nation's Memory Institute), however, he denied any cooperation. He is also criticized for praising Jozef Tiso, the president of Slovakia from 1939 to 1945. Tiso's government was responsible for the deportation of Jews from Slovakia.
