= Archdiocese of Trnava =

Roman Catholic archdiocese in Slovakia

Coordinates: 48.3804°N 17.5883°E

Archdiocese of Trnava Archidioecesis Tyrnaviensis Arcibiskupstvo Trnava

Catholic
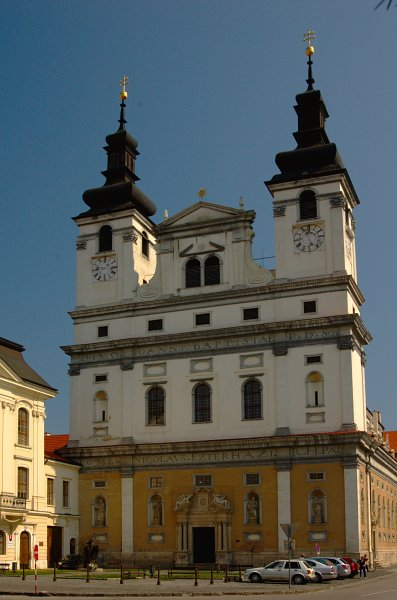
- St. John the Baptist Cathedral

- Coat of arms

Location
- Country: Slovakia
- Territory: Trnava, partly Nitra and Trenčín regions
- Ecclesiastical province: Bratislava
- Metropolitan: Bratislava

Statistics
- Area: 4,833 km^{2} (1,866 sq mi)
- Population: Total; Catholics: (as of 2020); 623,155; ▼451,174 (▼72.4%)

Information
- Denomination: Roman Catholic
- Sui iuris church: Latin Church
- Rite: Roman Rite
- Established: 1977
- Patron saint: John the Baptist

Current leadership
- Pope: Leo XIV
- Archbishop: Ján Orosch
- Bishops emeritus: Róbert Bezák, Ján Sokol

Map
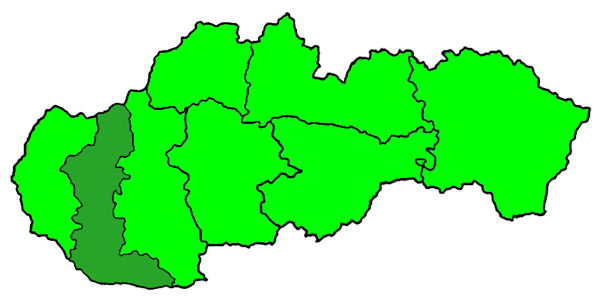
- Map of the Archdiocese

The Archdiocese of Trnava (Slovak: Trnavská arcidiecéza, Latin: Archidioecesis Tyrnaviensis) is a Latin Catholic archdiocese in western Slovakia including bigger part of the Trnava, and parts of Nitra and Trenčín regions. It has its seat in Trnava. Although it is an archdiocese, it is not a metropolitan and is instead a suffragan of Bratislava. In 2013 Pope Francis appointed Auxiliary Bishop Ján Orosch as the next Archbishop of the Archdiocese of Trnava.

== History ==
The diocese was first created as Apostolic Administration of Trnava on 29 May 1922, subordinate to the Holy See, on the territory of Archdiocese of Esztergom which became part of the Czechoslovakia after 1918. The first apostolic administrator was Pavol Jantausch.

On the order of Pope Paul VI on 30 December 1977, it was elevated to the status of metropolitan archdiocese and renamed to the Archdiocese of Trnava, and it had at first suffragans of Nitra, Banská Bystrica, Rožňava, Košice and Spiš. Despite the formal erection in 1977, the first Archbishop, Jan Sokol, was appointed only in 1989 due to the opposition of the Czechoslovak communist government. On 31 March 1995, the archdiocese was renamed to Archdiocese of Bratislava-Trnava, and since then it had only suffragans of Banská Bystrica and Nitra. Its territory covered Bratislava, Trnava, Nitra (except the city of Nitra and the strip connecting it with the main part of the Diocese of Nitra), small part of the Trenčín and south-western part of the Banská Bystrica regions. As of 2004, it covered an area of approximately 14,000 km² with a population of 1,930,000 people of which around 70% were of Catholic faith.

On 14 February 2008, the archdiocese was split between several dioceses. Trnava became seat of the newly created Archdiocese of Trnava, which, despite being an archdiocese, belongs to the ecclesiastical province of Bratislava as its suffragan. Other parts of the former diocese have been split between the dioceses of Nitra and Banská Bystrica (see e.g. this map (in Slovak).

Róbert Bezák, C.SS.R. (a member of the Redemptorist order) served as archbishop from 2009. In January 2012, the Vatican had named the Czech bishop Jan Baxant as its apostolic visitor to the archdiocese of Trnava. Archbishop Bezák's removal from this see was announced 2 July 2012.

== Bishops ==
- Ján Sokol (Archbishop: 26 July 1989 - 18 Apr 2009)
- Róbert Bezák (Archbishop: 18 Apr 2009 - 2 Jul 2012)
- Ján Orosch (Auxiliary Bishop: 14 Feb 2008, Apostolic Administrator: 2 Jul 2012, Archbishop: 11 Jul 2013 -)
