= Archdiocese of Bratislava =

Latin Catholic archdiocese in Slovakia

Coordinates: 48.1420°N 17.1049°E

Archdiocese of Bratislava Dioecesis Bratislaviensis Arcibiskupstvo Bratislava

Catholic
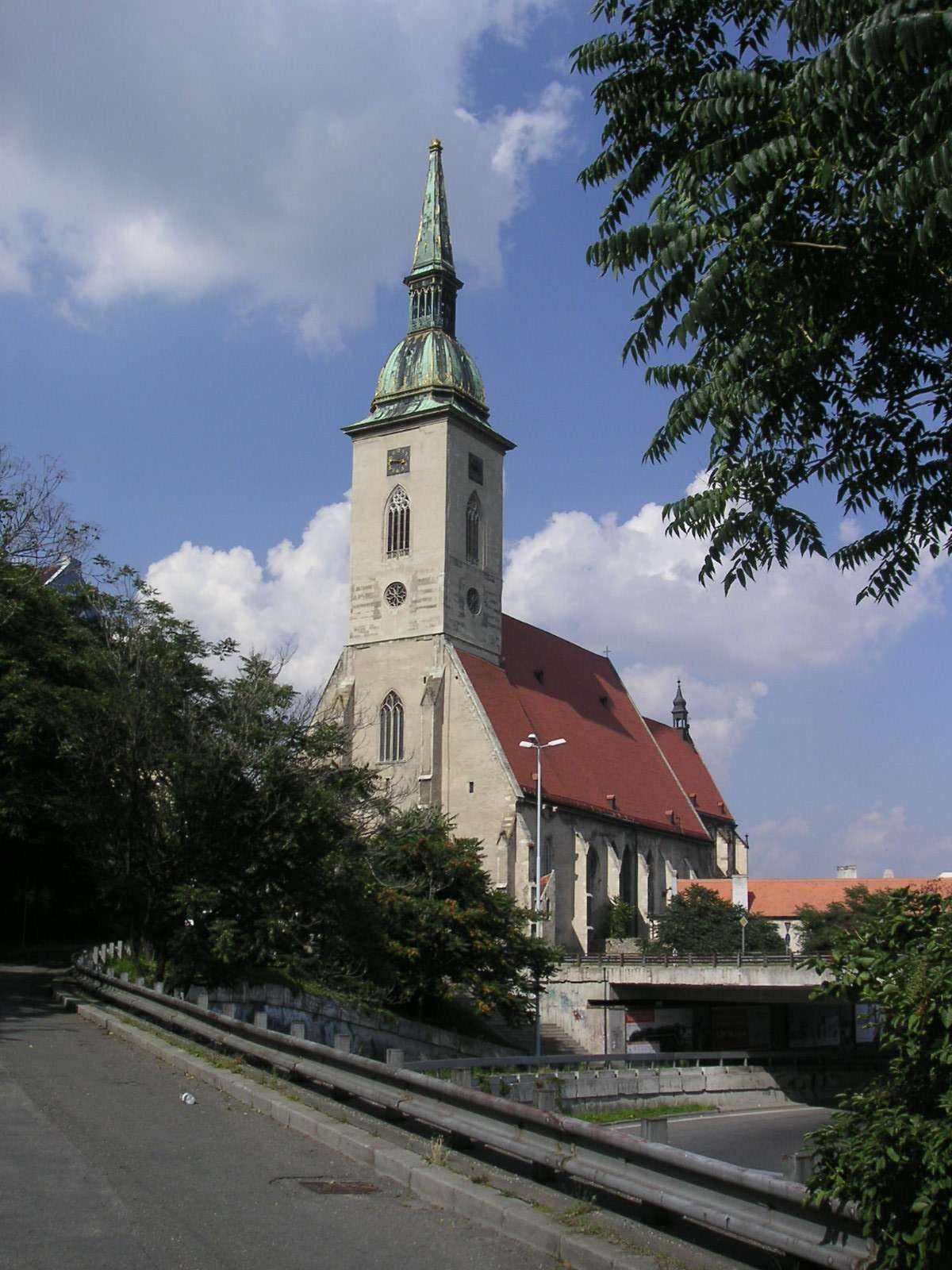
- St. Martin's Cathedral

- Coat of arms

Location
- Country: Slovakia
- Territory: Bratislava Region, parts of the Trnava Region
- Metropolitan: Bratislava

Statistics
- Area: 3,759 km^{2} (1,451 sq mi)
- Population: Total; Catholics: (as of 2020); ▲774,618; ▼443,097 (▼57.2%)
- Parishes: 124
- Churches: 206

Information
- Denomination: Catholic
- Sui iuris church: Latin Church
- Rite: Roman Rite
- Established: 2008
- Cathedral: St. Martin's Cathedral
- Patron saint: St Martin of Tours

Current leadership
- Pope: Leo XIV
- Archbishop: Stanislav Zvolenský
- Auxiliary Bishops: Jozef Haľko
- Vicar General: Jozef Haľko; Daniel Ižold

Map
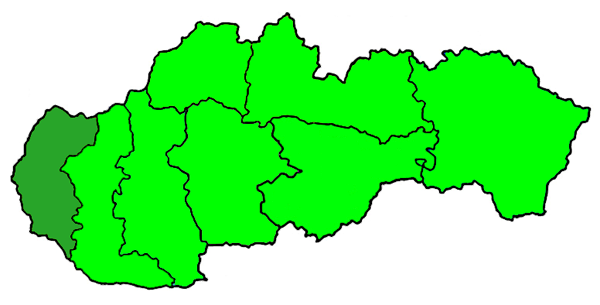
- Map of the Archdiocese

The Archdiocese of Bratislava (Slovak: Bratislavská arcidiecéza, Latin: Archidioecesis Bratislaviensis) is a Latin Church archdiocese of the Catholic Church in western Slovakia including Bratislava and the western Trnava regions. It has its seat in Bratislava. The current archbishop is Stanislav Zvolenský and auxiliary bishop is Jozef Haľko.

== History ==
It was first created as Apostolic Administration of Trnava on 29 May 1922, subordinate to the Archdiocese of Esztergom. On the order of Pope Paul VI on 30 December 1977, it was separated from the former, elevated to the status of Metropolitan Archdiocese, and it had at first suffragans of Nitra, Banská Bystrica, Rožňava, Košice and Spiš. Despite the formal erection in 1977, the first Archbishop, Ján Sokol, was appointed only in 1989 due to the opposition of the Czechoslovak communist government and the "traditional" difficult relationship between the Vatican and Czechoslovakia.

On 31 March 1995, the archdiocese was renamed to Archdiocese of Bratislava-Trnava, and since then it had only suffragans of Banská Bystrica and Nitra (after Košice became archdiocese with a new ecclesiastical province). Its territory covered Bratislava, Trnava, Nitra (except the city of Nitra and the strip connecting it with the main part of the Diocese of Nitra), small part of the Trenčín and south-western part of the Banská Bystrica regions. As of 2004, it covered an area of approximately 14,000 km^{2} with a population of 1,930,000 people of which around 70% were of Catholic faith.

On 14 February 2008, the archdiocese was split between several dioceses. It was renamed from Bratislava-Trnava into Archdiocese of Bratislava and the seat moved from Trnava to Bratislava, which became the seat of the Slovak church. Trnava became seat of the newly created Archdiocese of Trnava, which however still belongs to the ecclesiastical province of Bratislava as its suffragan. Other parts of the former diocese have been split between the dioceses of Nitra and Banská Bystrica.

=== Archbishop of Bratislava-Trnava ===
- Ján Sokol (1995-2008)

=== Archbishop of Bratislava ===
- Stanislav Zvolenský (2008-present)
