= Sládkovič =

Family name

Sládkovič is a name, possibly referring to:

- Andrej Sládkovič (1820–1872), Slovak poet, publicist, critic and translator
- 4781 Sládkovič, a main belt asteroid
