= List of people from Banská Bystrica =

This is a list of notable people from Banská Bystrica, Slovakia.

- Rudolf Baláž, Bishop of the Roman Catholic Diocese of Banská Bystrica 1990 to 2011
- Matej Bel, writer, historian
- Paľo Bielik, film director, actor
- Ján Botto, poet
- Andrej Braxatoris-Sládkovič, poet
- Peter Budaj, ice hockey player
- Ján Cikker, classical composer
- Viliam Figuš-Bystrý, classical composer
- Ján Golian, general
- Marek Hamšík, football player
- Michal Handzuš, ice hockey player
- Judith Hellwig, opera singer
- László Hudec, architect
- Adam František Kollár
- Anastasiya Kuzmina, biathlete, olympic gold medalist
- Ivan Majeský, ice hockey player
- Jozef Murgaš, inventor
- Barbara Nedeljáková, actress
- Vladimír Országh, ice hockey player
- Jana Plauchová, writer
- Hana Ponická, writer, anti-communist dissident
- Haviva Reik, Jewish soldier
- Radovan Sloboda (born 1966), Slovak politician
- Tomáš Surový, ice hockey player
- Peter Tomka, diplomat and judge
- Ladislav Záborský, painter
- Richard Zedník, ice hockey player
