= Sásová =

Neighborhood of Banská Bystrica, Slovakia

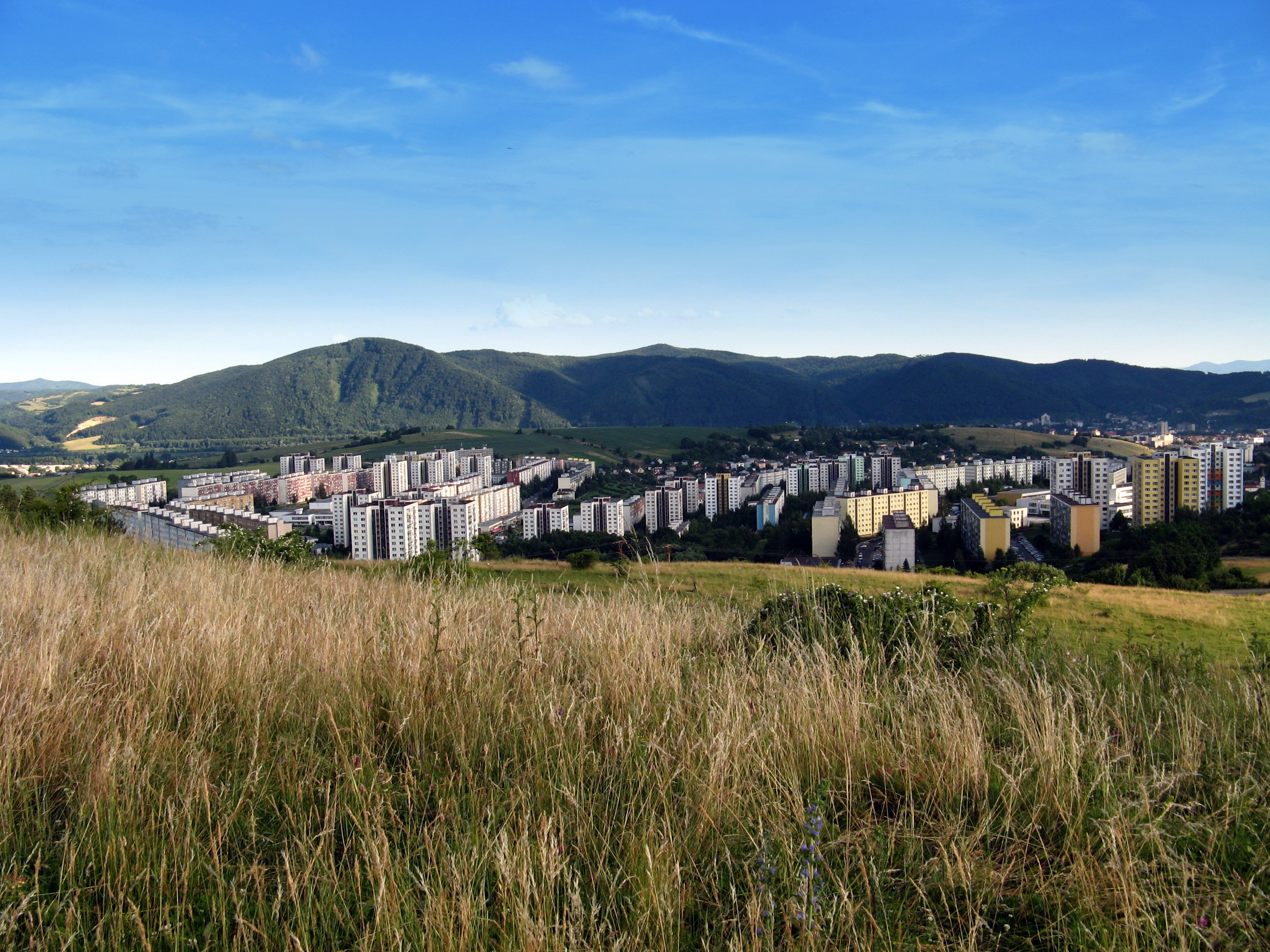
Sásová

Sásová (also known as Sásová-Rudlová, Hungarian: Zólyomszászfalu) is a suburb of Banská Bystrica. Sásová is located in Central Slovakia, approximately 7 kilometers northeast of the center of Banská Bystrica. To the north, it is surrounded by the Panský diel hill, which is home to the recreational area Šachtičky. Approximately 25,000 people live here. In the 1980s, panel houses were built due to the growing demand for new apartments in this area. Originally, most of the residents were people who moved to Banská Bystrica for work. It is located on a relatively small area.

According to data from 2008, the district had 18,082 inhabitants.

== History ==
The first written mention of the area is from 1350 as Villa Militis (“village of the knight”), founded by Mikuláš Sas, the son of Ondrej, the mayor of Banská Bystrica. The original population was engaged in mining and agriculture. Miners mainly mined precious metals in surface pits around Vtáčnik, Štrbina, and Nemčianska dolina, and panned for gold at the mouths of the Sásovský potok and Jelšovie creek.

The housing estate also includes the area of Rudlová (which emerged in the second half of the 14th century due to a property division from Sásová in favor of the mayor Rudelin; it was mentioned in 1390). This area mainly consists of family houses, making it a quieter part of Sásová.

In 1966, it became a part of Banská Bystrica.

== Administration ==
Together with Rudlová, Sásová forms Electoral District No. 3, which has 9 representatives in the city council.

== Culture and attractions ==
- Roman Catholic Church of St. Anthony and St. Paul the Hermits: A single-nave Gothic building with a rectangularly terminated presbytery and a tower forming part of the church structure from the first half of the 14th century. It is located in a fortified area in the middle of the village. The church was modified in the late Gothic style in the 1490s. The presbytery and nave have preserved Gothic rib vaults with donor coats of arms on the keystones and stonemason marks. Two of the original three Gothic altars have been preserved. The oldest side altar of St. Sophia from 1440 is in the collections of the Central Slovak Museum in Banská Bystrica. The main late Gothic altar of St. Anthony and St. Paul dates from around 1500. The altar case contains sculptures of St. Paul and St. Anthony praying at the cross. The altar wings depict scenes from the life of St. Anthony, including four scenes of temptation, Jesus appearing to the saint in a dream, the saint with a caravan, the saint in a coffin, and the saint with an angel. The top features five statues: Madonna with Child, flanked by St. Martin, St. Nicholas, St. Ladislaus, and St. Barbara. The predella depicts Veronica’s veil carried by angels. The church also contains a late Gothic altar of St. Helena and St. Giles from around 1510.
- Evangelical Bell Tower: A masonry building with a square plan and pyramidal roof from 1913. The facade is decorated with corner rustication, and the windows have decorative surrounds. The resonance opening is designed as a double window. A clock face is mounted on the gable. Below, there is a bust of Milan Rastislav Štefánik.

== Interesting facts ==
The village of Sásová is mentioned in a saying: "There are as many of you as there are Sásoväni" (meaning there is a whole crowd of people). In this form, the most famous saying from Sásová was used throughout Slovakia in the 20th century, even in crowded trams in Prague. In practice, this saying reflected how the people of Sásová have always attended social, cultural, and sports events in the village and surrounding areas collectively.

== Public amenities ==
Services in Sásová are at a relatively good level. There are two larger supermarkets, a shopping center, and dozens of other shops. There are also various restaurants and pubs. Additionally, there is a Dalioil gas station, a post office, several flower shops, hair salons, betting offices, gambling establishments, and various other services. The polyclinic on Rudohorská Street houses offices of various doctors, from general practitioners to dentists. There are also several pharmacies available. Sásová also has a retirement home in a peaceful area near a park.

== Education ==
There are five primary schools, one high school, and a faculty of Matej Bel University in Sásová. In 2008, there were considerations to close two or three primary schools, but the proposal was eventually postponed until after the municipal elections. Ultimately, the Magurská and Tatranská schools were closed. Part of the Magurská school was rented by a private company, which established a private school called Fantázia (now known as Two Hands) and a kindergarten.
