= Museum of the Slovak National Uprising =

Museum in Banská Bystrica to commemorate an antifascist revolt during WWII

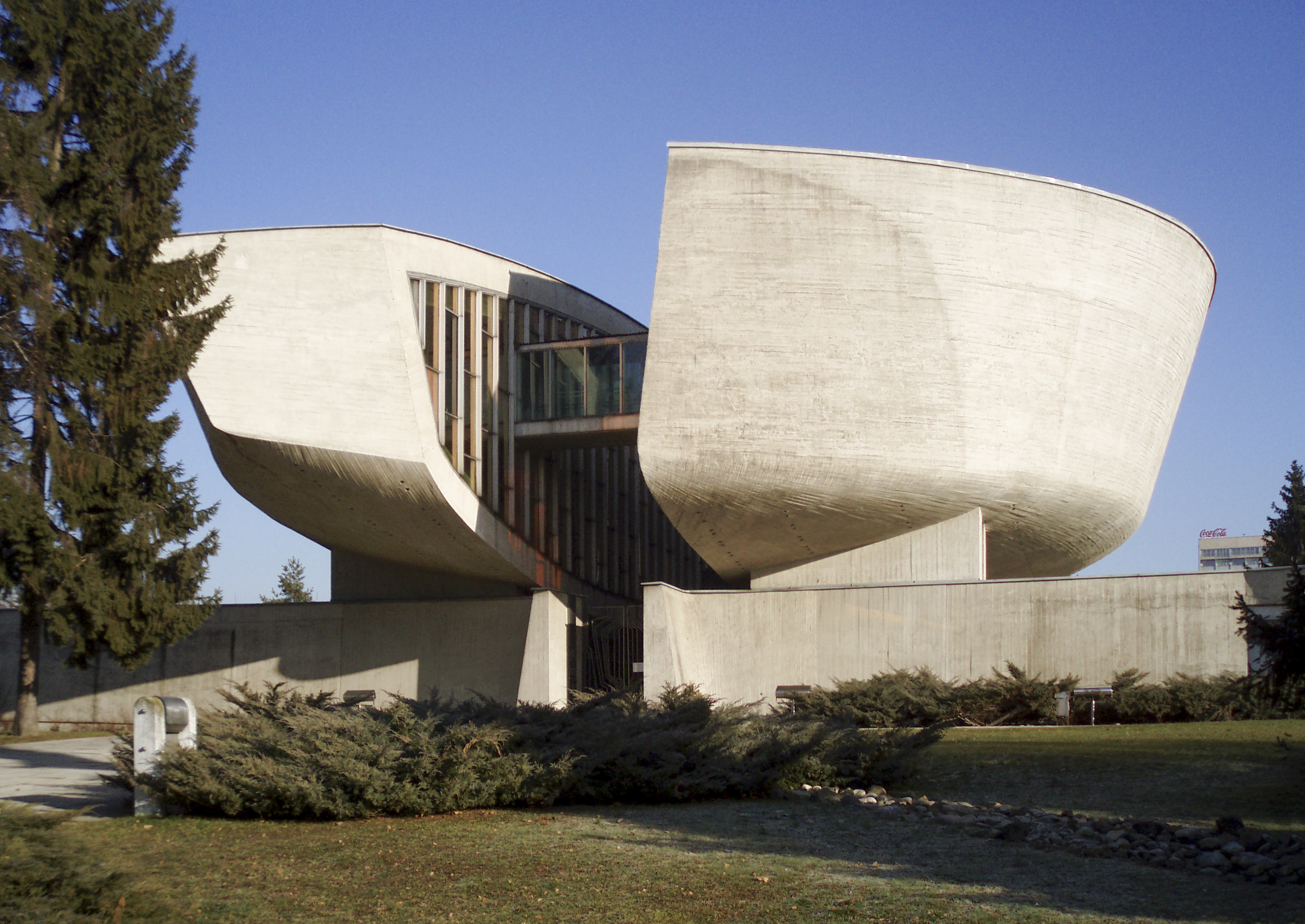

The Museum of the Slovak National Uprising (Slovak: Múzeum Slovenského národného povstania) is a museum in Banská Bystrica that commemorates the Slovak National Uprising of 1944, an antifascist revolt during World War II. The museum documents the history of the Slovak State, which lasted from 1939 to 1945 and collaborated with Nazi Germany, and the Slovak National Uprising.

The Slovak National Uprising (Slovak: Slovenské národné povstanie, abbreviated SNP) was an uprising organized by the Slovak resistance movement during World War II. It was not an insurgency but an organized military effort by the Allied-recognised resistance army—The 1st Czechoslovak Army in Slovakia. This resistance movement was represented mainly by the members of the Democratic Party, but also by Social Democrats and Communists, albeit on a smaller scale. It was launched on 29 August 1944 from Banská Bystrica in an attempt to resist German troops that had occupied Slovak territory, and to overthrow the collaborationist government of Jozef Tiso. Although the resistance was largely defeated by German forces, guerrilla operations continued until the Red Army, Czechoslovak Army and Romanian Army occupied the Slovak Republic in 1945.

The museum was founded in 1955. The building was designed by architect Dušan Kuzma and completed in 1969.
