= Slovenská pošta =

Postal service of Slovakia

- Industry: Postal service
- Predecessor: Czechoslovak Post
- Founded: 1 January 1993; 33 years ago
- Headquarters: Banská Bystrica
- Area served: Slovakia
- Products: Mail, EMS, Postage stamps
- Net income: ▼€342,000 (2017)
- Website: http://www.posta.sk/en

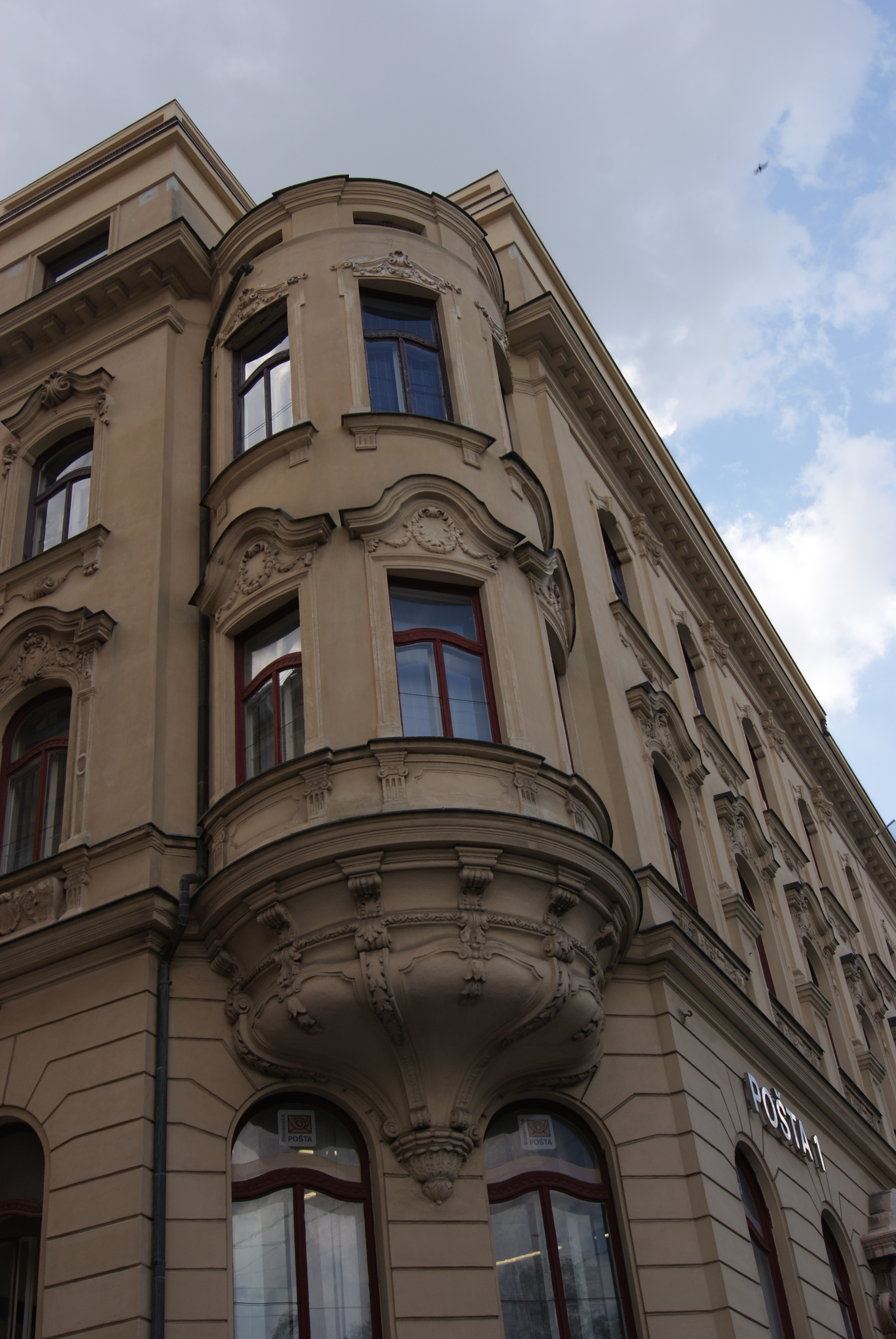
A Slovenská pošta building at námestie Slovenského národného povstania in Bratislava

Slovenská pošta, a. s. (literally Slovak Post) is a state-owned company responsible for providing postal service in Slovakia established on 1 January 1993 when Slovakia became an independent state and became a public limited company owned by the state on 1 October 2004. It operates over 1,500 post offices throughout the country. It is also the third largest employer in Slovakia. The headquarters are located in Banská Bystrica.

Among the organisation's responsibilities are providing a universal postal service, express and courier delivery, operating temporary post offices, issuing postage stamps and a postal museum.
