= Marína =

Slovak romantic poem by Andrej Sladkovic

- Author: Andrej Sládkovič
- Language: Slovak
- Publication date: 1846
- Publication place: Pest, Kingdom of Hungary

Marína is the name of a Slovak romantic poem by Andrej Sládkovič (Andrej Braxatoris) written in the Winter of 1844 and published two years later in 1845 in Pest. Alongside his lyrico-epical work, Detvan, it is considered the pinnacle of his poetic career. It has been translated into German, Polish, Hungarian and French. The work has components of both love and reflexive poetry. Still, balladic themes are also present, which surge from his sorrowful love for Mária Geržová. In the year 1845, on one of the meetings of the Tatrín association, this piece was considered too ''un-Slavic''. Now it is considered to be one of the central works of Slovak Romanticism.

Marína has 286 10-versed stanzas and 5 8-versed stanzas, while every stanza is a closed thought. Together with 2900 verses, Marína has been considered the longest love poem in the world for 170 years.

The main reason for writing this poem was the author's love for his student Mária Pischl, whom he fell in love with in the year 1839, however Mária was forced, by her mother, to marry a man from a prestigious family. Sládkovič mentions many geographical parts of Slovakia (e.g. Sitno, and Hron). Unlike other Slovak Romanticist poets, Sládkovič combines love for the country with love for a woman.

== Parts ==
1. Lyrico-epical - describes the sorrowful love for Mária Pischl
2. Reflexive (sometimes symbolic) - the love gains a social character

There are mainly 4 themes present:

- Beauty
- Love for Marína
- love for Slovakia
- Youth
