= Urpín =

Mountain in Slovakia

Coordinates: 48°43′31″N 19°08′28″E

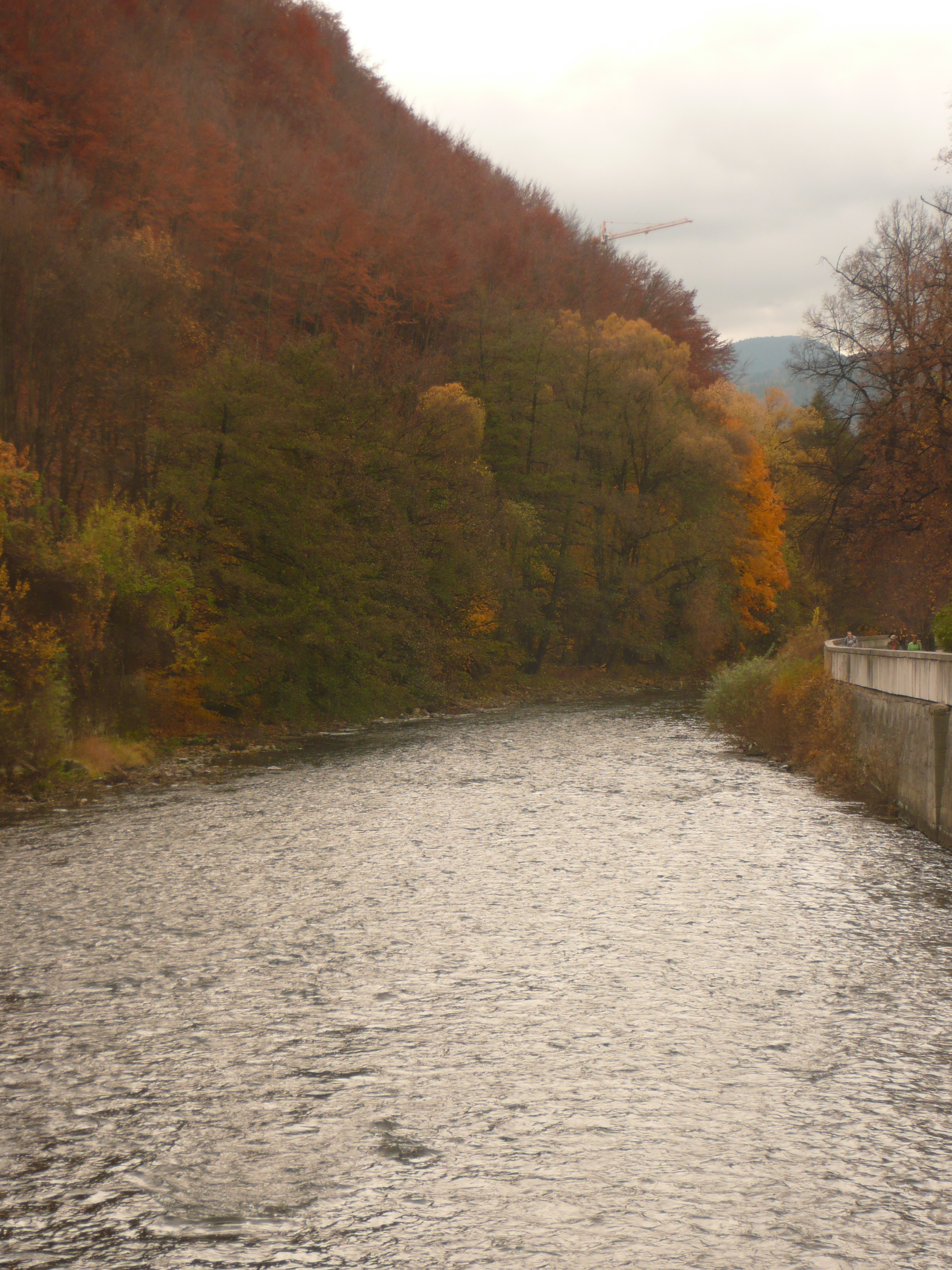
The forested slope of Urpín rising from the left bank of the Hron. On the right bank (not seen) is downtown Banská Bystrica.

Urpín is a mountain in Banská Bystrica, Slovakia. It is situated on the left bank of the Hron river, above the old town. Despite its low elevation of 510 m AMSL (1,673 ft), Urpín dominates the cityscape due to its proximity to the city center. The mountain offers a panoramic view of the Hron basin from the easternmost outskirts of Banská Bystrica to the town of Zvolen, as well as of the surrounding mountain ranges of the Low Tatras and the Veľká Fatra. It is accessible by several hiking trails from the center of Banská Bystrica. Historical monuments located on Urpín chart the turbulent history of the city built underneath this mountain. However, in defiance of its urban environs, the largely forested mountain is characterized by the surprisingly diverse fauna and flora.

== Nature ==
Urpín is mostly covered by a beech forest. Other widespread trees are the pine, maple, and tilia. The top of the mountain has a typical forest steppe vegetation. Despite its proximity to a major city, Urpín contains 35 endangered animal species and many rare plant species. It is also home to 280 species of spiders. An alley of 64 Tilia platyphyllos trees was planted in the 18th century, but the aged trees are now an important part of the ecosystem. A nature preserve founded in 1997 covers an area of 5.02 ha of Urpín.

== History ==
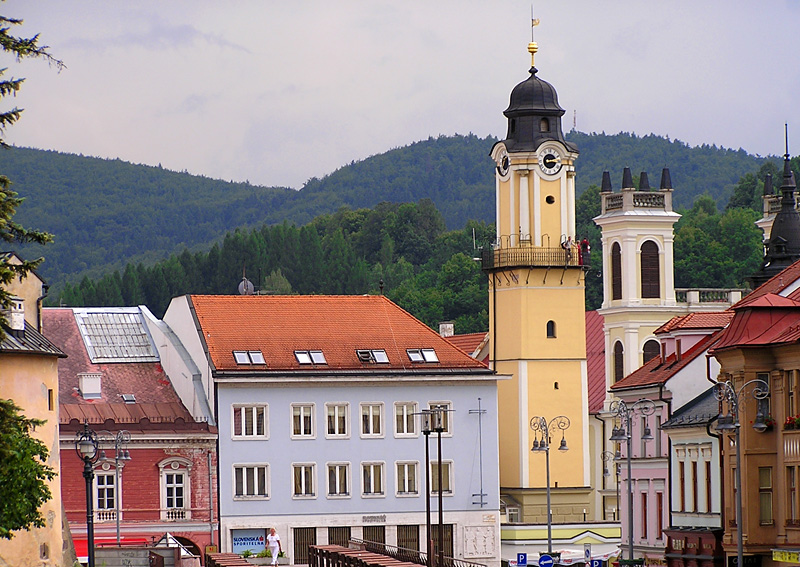
Urpín's two summits (Urpín and Vartovka) behind Banská Bystrica's clock tower

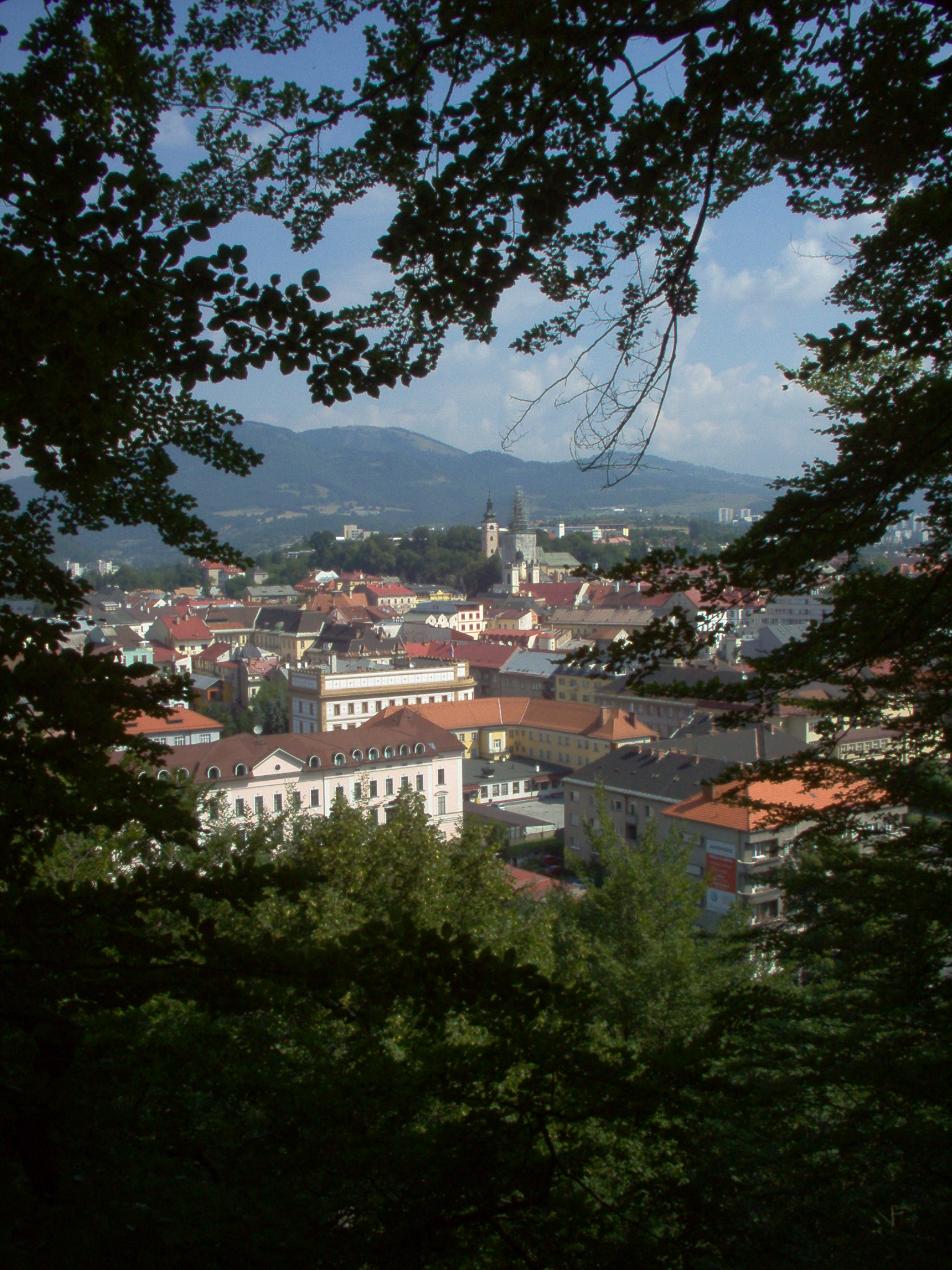
The center of Banská Bystrica viewed from Urpín

The Ottoman Empire's advance northwards in the 16th century threatened rich mining towns in central Slovakia. Banská Bystrica, a leading producer of copper in Europe, responded to this new danger by modernizing its fortification. As part of its early warning system, the city built a watchtower on one of Urpín's summits in 1587. The archaic Slovak word for a watchtower, vartovka, also became the name of that summit itself. The watchtower was connected to the city by a secret underground passage, passing under the Hron river. After it was damaged during the World War II, the tower was converted into an astronomical observatory.

Another historical monument on Urpín is called Calvary (Slovak: Kalvária). Although Banská Bystrica was in the 17th century part of an empire ruled by a Catholic dynasty of the Habsburgs, the city itself was almost purely Protestant. During the state-sponsored Counter-Reformation, the Order of Jesuits arrived to Banská Bystrica in 1648. In 1689, the Jesuits founded a pilgrimage site on Urpín. A church was built on the top in 1713, and small shrines representing the Stations of the Cross were raised along the trail leading to the church in 1714. The interior of the church featured a flag decorated with 1.21 kg of silver. The church and shrines were reconstructed in 2007. The works were finished by putting in a new bell weighing 80 kg. Along with the reconstruction began the building of a small monastery in the vicinity of the old church, which was achieved in 2008. A celebratory mass was held in the church on 28 September 2008 by Mons. Rudolf Baláž, bishop of Banská Bystrica. The church is dedicated to the Holy Cross, and during Lent there are weekly processions of Way of the Cross.

Urpín has been a popular recreation area. The trails leading to the top used to be equipped with nightlights. Until the 1960s, dixieland bands played music on Urpín every Sunday afternoon, attracting dancers and partygoers from the city beneath the mountain.

As a dominant natural feature of Banská Bystrica, the mountain has also given its name to some of the city's companies and organizations, such as Urpiner Beer, Hotel Urpín, and the Urpín folklore ensemble.
