= Radvaň, Banská Bystrica =

Borough of Banská Bystrica, Slovakia

Coordinates: 48.7144°N 19.1367°E

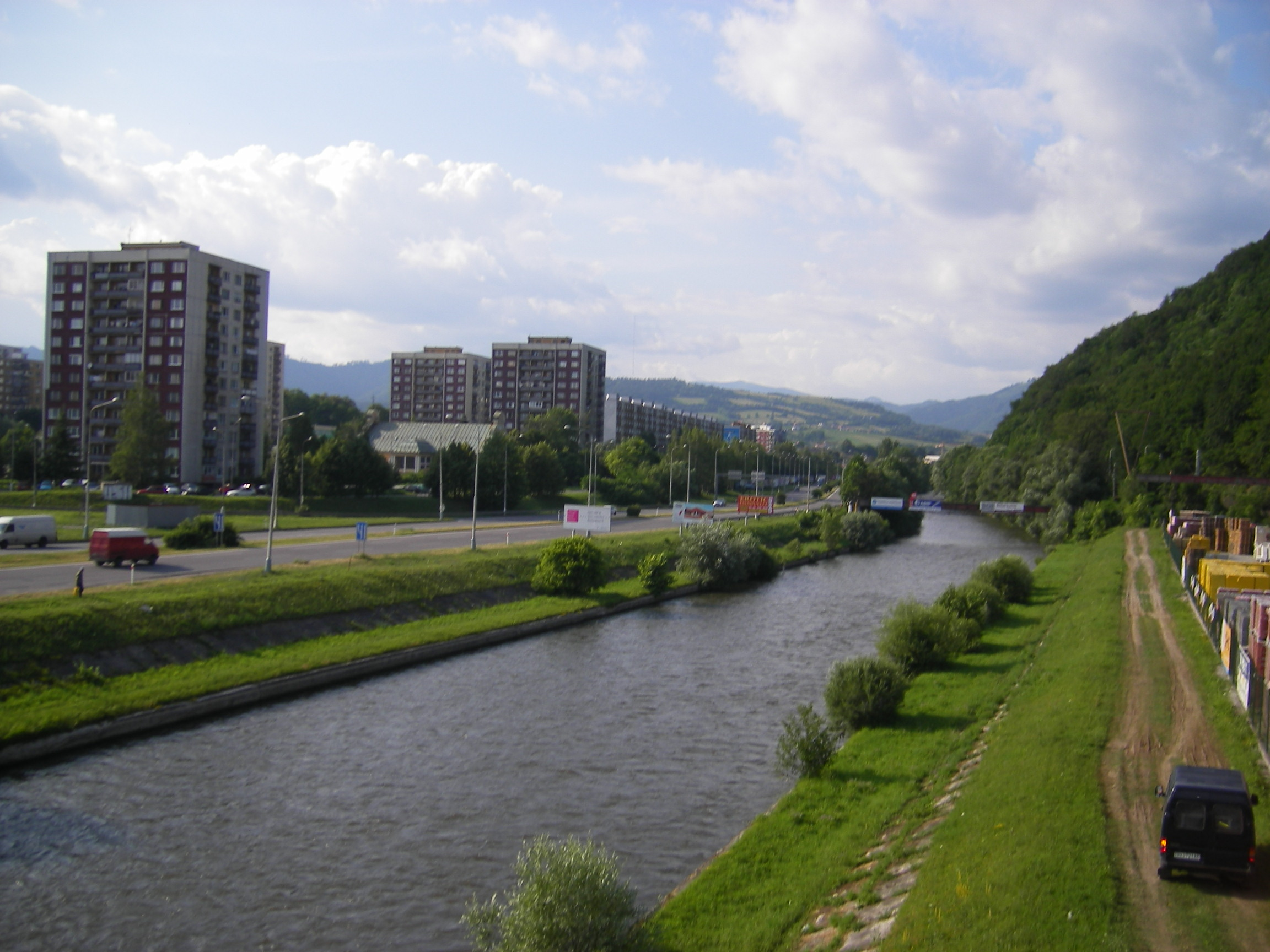
Radvaň (on the left), with the Hron River on the right

Radvaň (Hungarian: Radvány) is a borough of Banská Bystrica, located south-west of the city centre. Until 1964 it was a separate village, when it was merged into the village of Radvaň-Kráľová, which in turn was made part of Banská Bystrica in 1966.

It was first mentioned in 1263. The annual Radvaň fairs on 8 September have been held since 1650, transferred in the 20th century to Banská Bystrica. The writer Andrej Sládkovič lived and worked in Radvaň from 1856 until his death in 1872.
