= Andrej Sládkovič =

Slovak poet

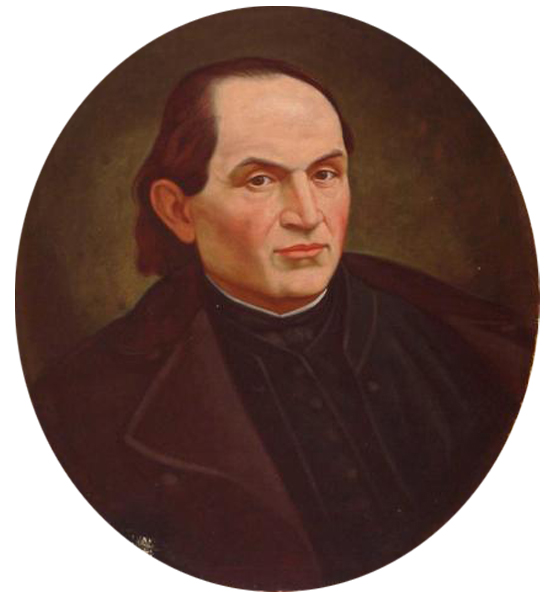
- Portrait by Jozef Božetech Klemens
- Born: 30 March 1820; Krupina, Austrian Empire
- Died: 20 April 1872 (aged 52); Radvaň Nad Hronom, Austria-Hungary
- Other name: born as Andrej Braxatoris
- Employer(s): Lutheran priest, poet, translator and publicist
- Partner: Antónia Júlia Sekovičová (wife)

Signature
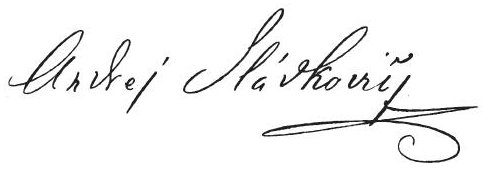

Andrej Sládkovič (born as Andrej Braxatoris, pseudonyms Andrej Braxatoris-Sládkovič, Andrej Sládkovič, Ondřej Krasislav Sládkovič; 31 March 1820, Krupina – 20 April 1872, Radvaň Nad Hronom, today the part of the city of Banská Bystrica) was a Slovak poet, critic, publicist, translator and Lutheran priest.

== Life ==
Andrej Sládkovič was born into a family of teachers in Krupina. His school years started in his hometown (1826–30). He later attended a gymnasium in Krupina and at the Lutheran lyceums in Banská Štiavnica and Bratislava. He continued his studies in theology at the University of Halle, Kingdom of Saxony (1843–44).

In years 1839 – 1840, he taught Pavol Pišla in his household where Andrej Sládkovič met Marína Pišlová, the woman who inspired him to write a poetical work Marína. In 1838, he worked as an assistant of teacher in Ladzany. In 1841, together with Samuel Jurkovič, he contributed to create the "slovak national theater" in Sobotište.

In years 1842 – 1843, he worked as an educator in Hodruša-Hámre, soon after he came back from studies at the University of Halle, he became a family educator in Pavol Bezegh family in Rybáre (today the part of the city of Sliač). In 1847 he became a pastor, he served in Hrochoť. With enthusiasm, he welcomed the revolution in years 1848 – 1849. He believed the ideals of freedom, equality and brotherhood penetrate the consciousness of nations and will become determinative in wide social-political and cultural context. In 1849, he was captured and investigated. Since 1856 until his death in Radvaň, he served as a pastor. He was a member of the Ľudovít Štúr's group and was also one of the founders of the Matica slovenská.

== Works ==
- Sôvety (1843–44)
- Marína (1846, his most significant poem, also translated into Hungarian, German, Polish and French)
- Zaspievam pieseň o slobodnej vlasti (1848)
- Nehaňte ľud môj (1848)
- Detvan (1853, an opera was made in 1928)
- Milica (1858)
- Svätomartiniáda (1861)
- Pamiatka na deň 4. augusta (1863, remembers establishment of the Matica slovenská)
- Hojže, Bože, jak to bolí, keď sa junač roztratí (1863)
- Lipa cyrilo-metodejská (1864)
- Gróf Mikuláš Šubić Zrínsky na Sihoti (1866)

Sládkovič also translated works from German (Goethe), Russian (Pushkin) and French (Voltaire, Jean Racine).
