= Banská Bystrica =

City in Slovakia

- City
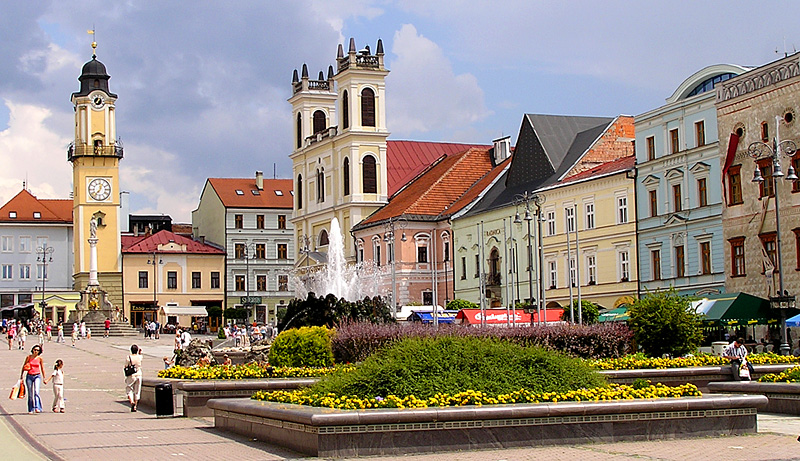
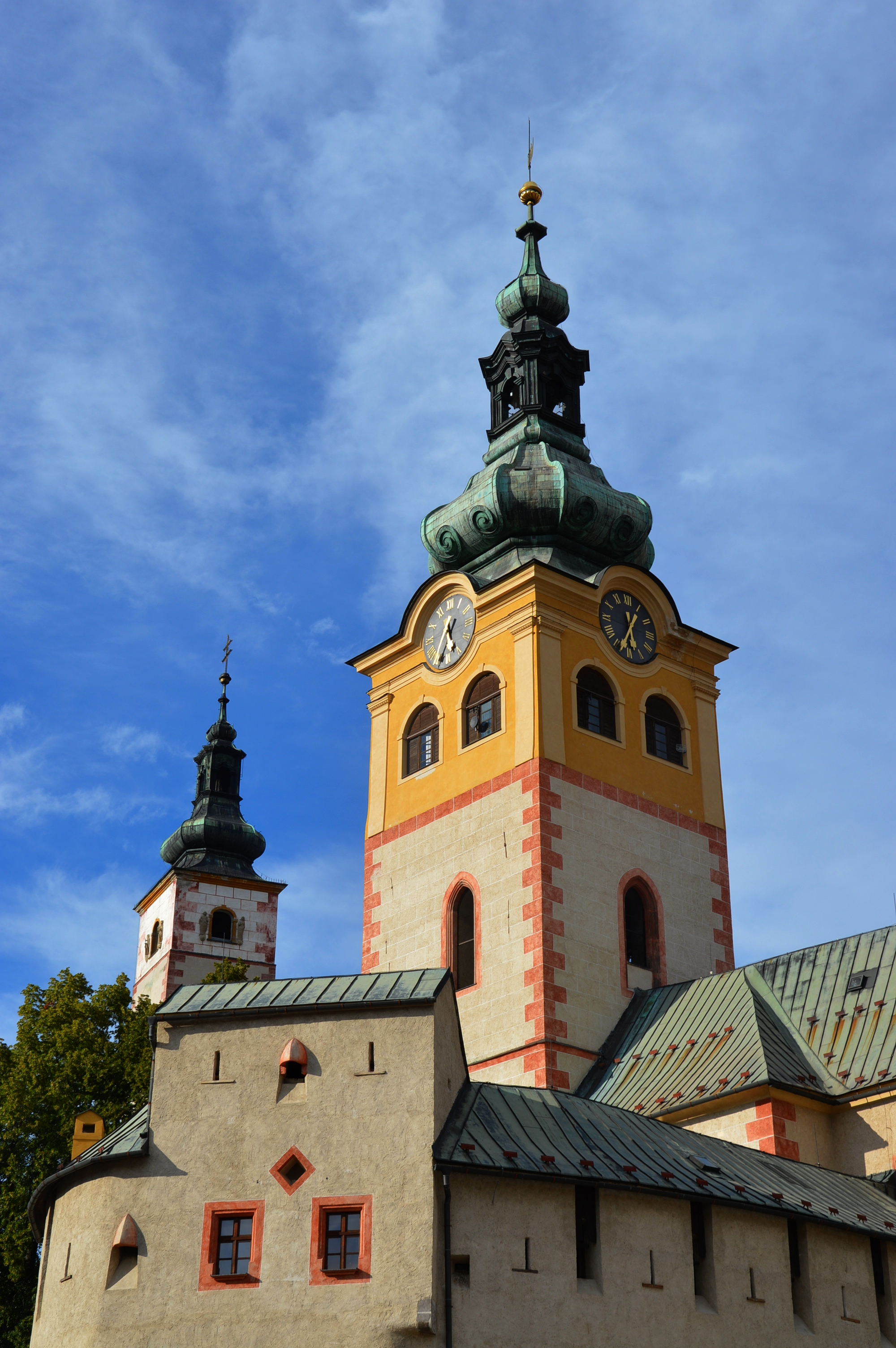
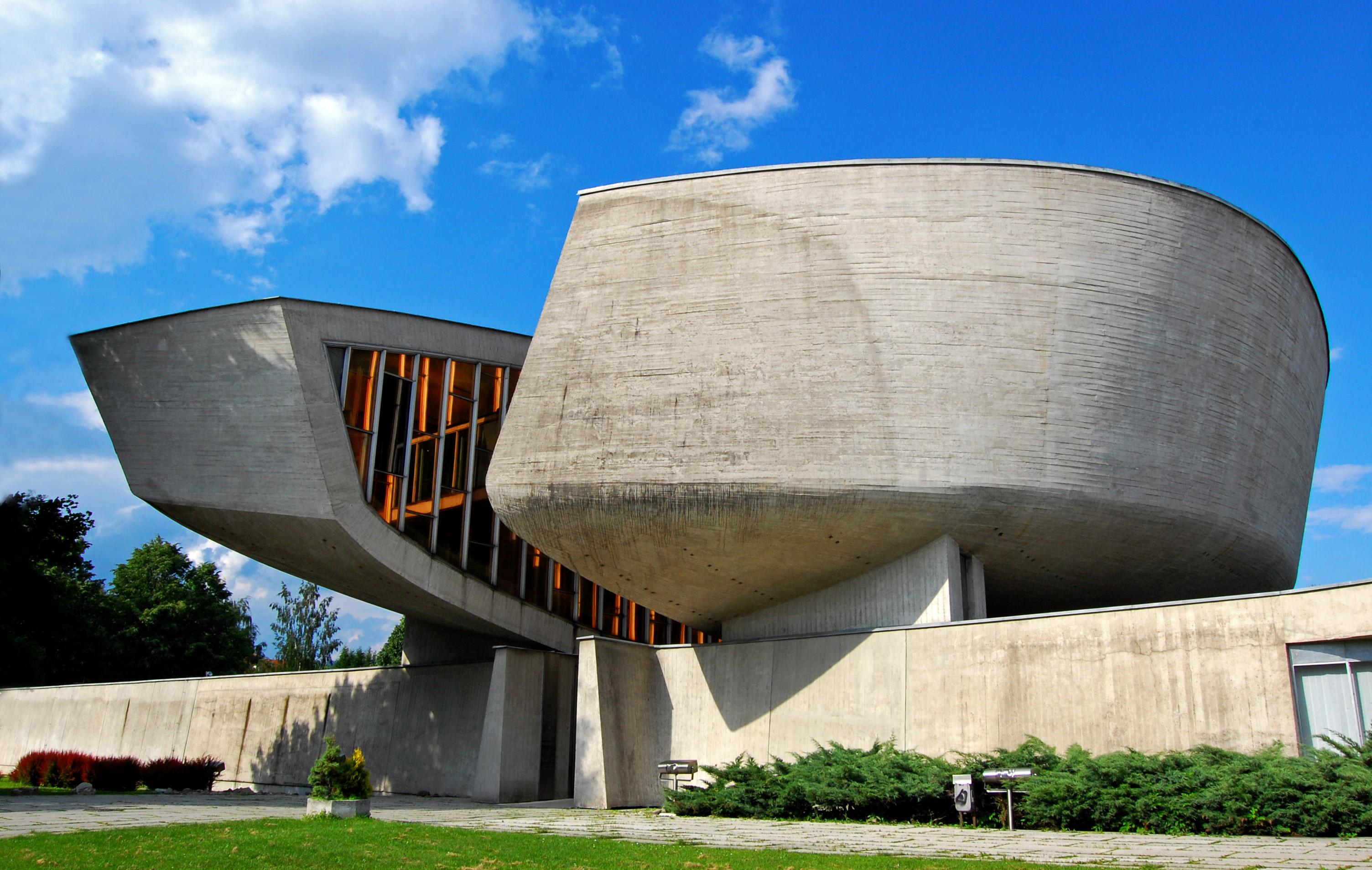
- From the top, SNP Square, The Barbican, Museum of the Slovak National Uprising

- Flag Coat of arms
- Etymology: "Mining creek"
- Location of Banská Bystrica in the Banská Bystrica Region Banská Bystrica (Slovakia)
- Coordinates: 48°44′07″N 19°08′43″E
- Country: Slovakia
- Region: Banská Bystrica
- District: Banská Bystrica
- First mentioned: 1255

Government
  - Mayor: Ján Nosko (Independent)

Area
  - Total: 103.36 km^{2} (39.91 sq mi)
- (2022)
- Elevation: 368 m (1,207 ft)

Population (2025)
  - Total: 73,054
- Time zone: UTC+1 (CET)
  - Summer (DST): UTC+2 (CEST)
- Postal code: 974 01
- Area code: +421 48
- Vehicle registration plate (until 2022): BB
- Website: eng.banskabystrica.sk

Banská Bystrica (Slovak pronunciation: [ˈbanskaː ˈbistritsa], Hungarian: Besztercebánya, German: Neusohl) is a city in central Slovakia, located on the Hron River in a long and wide valley encircled by the mountain chains of the Low Tatras, the Veľká Fatra, and the Kremnica Mountains. With approximately 76,000 inhabitants, Banská Bystrica is the sixth most populous municipality in Slovakia. The present-day town was founded by German settlers who were invited by the Hungarian Árpád kings during the Middle Ages (as part of the Ostsiedlung), but it was built upon a former Slavic/Slovak/Avar settlement. It became a part of Zólyom County after Hungarian conquest. In 1255, during the reign of Béla IV of Hungary, it obtained the municipal privileges of a free royal town of the Kingdom of Hungary and was resettled by Germans from Thüringen. The copper mining town acquired its present picturesque look in the late Middle Ages when the prosperous burghers built its central churches, mansions, and fortifications. It is the capital of the kraj (more specifically Banská Bystrica Region) and the okres (Banská Bystrica District). It is also the home of Matej Bel University. As a historical town with easy access to the surrounding mountains, Banská Bystrica is a popular winter and summer tourist destination.

== Etymology ==
The Slovak name Banská Bystrica includes two roots: the adjective Banská from Slovak baňa – "mine", and the name of the local river Bystrica (from Slavic bystrica – "swift stream"). The name of the town in Hungarian: "Besztercebánya" also comes from the Beszterce stream (from the Slavic name of the stream, Bystrica), and the suffix bánya is connected to the mines of the town. The river lent its name to the town as early as 1255 when the Latin name Villa Nova Bystrice (meaning "New Town of Bystrica") was recorded in the document in which King Béla IV of Hungary granted the town royal privileges.

Several variations of Bystrica (Byztherze, Bystrice, Bystrzice, etc.) were then regularly used without the adjective identifying it as a mining town until the late 16th century. Although the first written record of the name Byzterchebana dates from 1263, it was rarely used afterwards. The Old German name Neusohl ("New Zvolen") (first recorded in 1300) and later its Latin version (Neosolium) reflected the fact that some early settlers came from the nearby town of Zvolen (at the time known in German as Altsohl, literally "Old Zvolen"). The two names have been used in parallel and even together (as in Novizolii Bistriciensis) throughout the history of the town. In the late 16th century, the use of the mining adjective became more frequent (as in Bystrzicze na baniech or Bystricze Banska, both from 1530). This evolution resulted in the current form of the name, first recorded in 1773 as Banska Bystrica. In the Austrian Empire, the German name Neusohl was used until the compromise of 1867, when the Hungarian name Besztercebánya became the official one. The parallel use of Slovak or German names in the written record did not, however, cease in this period. Banská Bystrica became the official name of the town in 1920.

== History ==
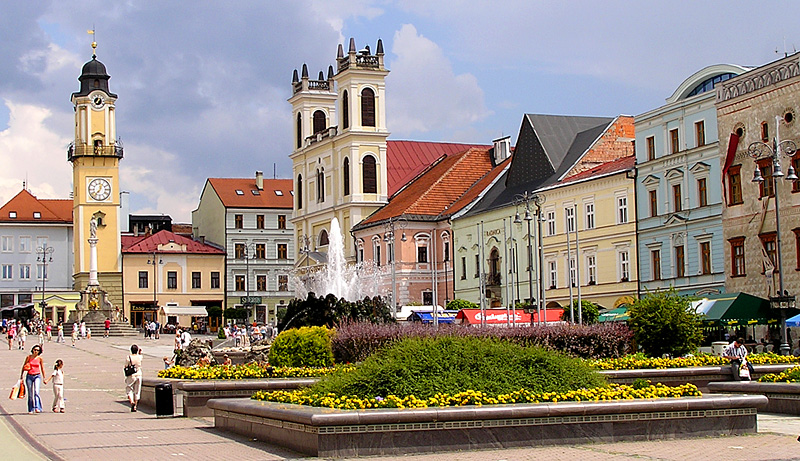
The town square of Banská Bystrica

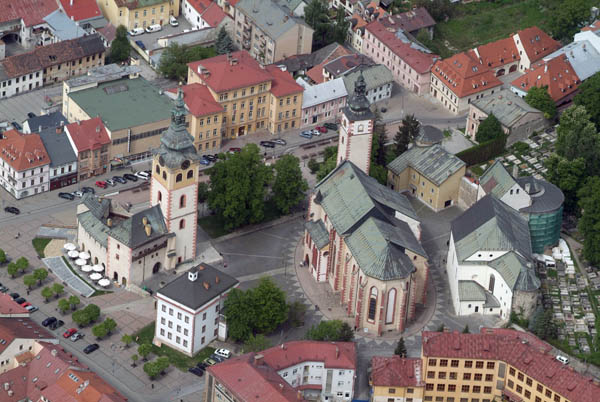
The town centre of Banská Bystrica (seen from above)

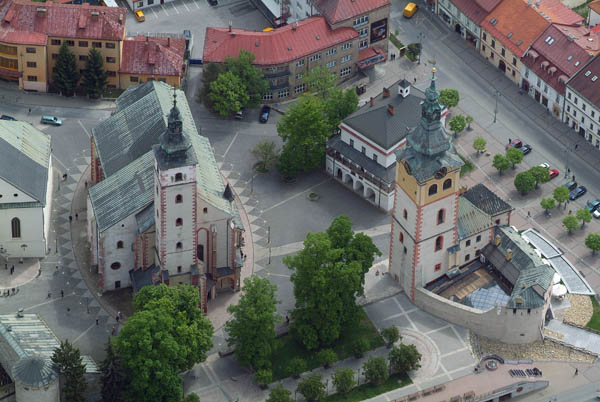
The town centre of Banská Bystrica (seen from above)

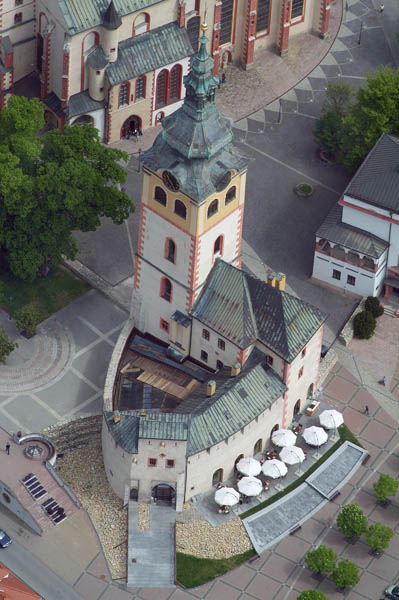
The town barbican (seen from above)

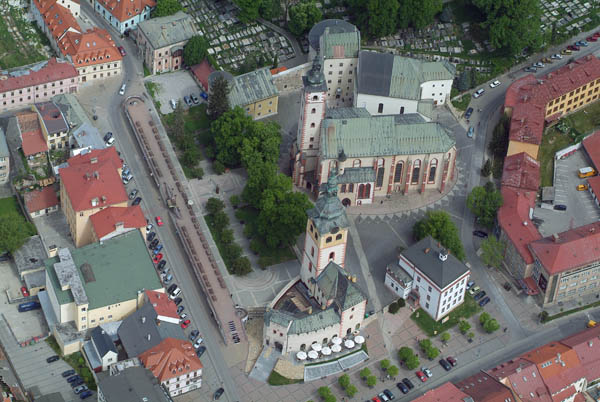
The town centre of Banská Bystrica (seen from above)

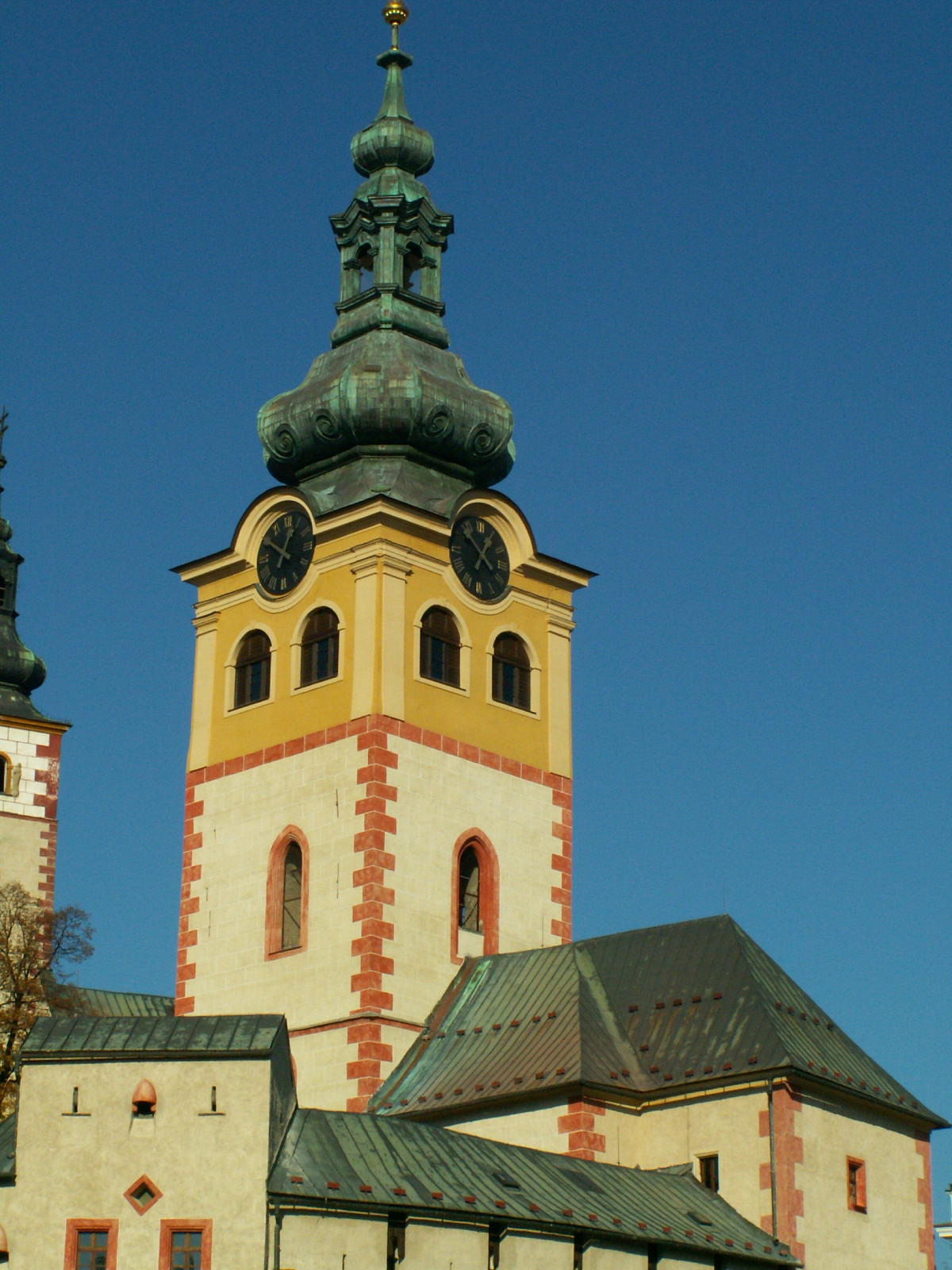
Town barbican (close-up view)

The earliest history of Banská Bystrica was connected to the extraction of its abundant deposits of copper (and to a lesser extent of silver, gold, and iron). The tools used by prehistoric miners at the locality called Špania Dolina have been dated to 2000–1700 BC. People of the Lusatian culture built their settlements at Špania Dolina, Horné Pršany, Malachov, and Sásová. Ancient hill fort locations are still reflected in the local toponym Hrádok, meaning "a small fort (later: castle)". The territory was inhabited by the Celtic tribe of the Cotini (Púchov culture) in the 3rd century BC. The Germanic tribe of the Quadi took over the place during the Roman Era, leaving for instance a hoard of silver artifacts in Netopierska jaskyňa (Bat Cave).

The present city was built upon a former Slavic settlement. After the Hungarian conquest of the Carpathian Basin it was incorporated into Zólyom county of the Kingdom of Hungary. The first known stone church was built by Saxon immigrants in the then still independent settlement of Sásová in the first half of the 13th century, when the area belonged to the king. According to Slovak archaeologists, Banská Bystrica started as a permanent settlement in the 9th century. Other sources claim that due to the attack of Mongols, in 1243–44, the town ceased to exist. In 1255, King Béla IV granted Banská Bystrica extensive municipal privileges to attract more skilled settlers. Descendants of the German immigrants to this and other counties later became known as the Carpathian Germans. The city flourished as a regional mining center. It built the Late Romanesque Church of the Virgin Mary in the second half of the 13th century. During the same period, Banská Bystrica obtained its own coat of arms inspired by the coat of arms of the ruling dynasty of the Árpáds, also used as the historical flag of the Kingdom of Hungary. The local craftsmen were organized in fifty guilds, with the butchers' guild being the oldest.

The affluent Fugger and Thurzo families founded the prosperous Ungarischer Handel company (German for "Hungarian Trade") in 1494. Depending mainly on the mines around Banská Bystrica, the company had become a leading world producer of copper by the 16th century. With the most sophisticated mining technologies in Europe, an advanced accounting system, and benefits including medical care for its 1,000 employees, Ungarischer Handel was one of the largest and most modern early-capitalist firms. An early record of the miners' industrial action is from 1526 when the City Council needed to take refuge within the confines of City Castle. The Ottoman Empire's thrust northwards led the magistrate to improve the city's fortifications with modern stone walls in 1589, but the Turks never occupied the region. Banská Bystrica became one of the foremost centers of the Protestant Reformation in the Kingdom of Hungary in the 16th century. Later on, the city had to fight for its religious freedom, guaranteed by the Royal Charter, against the Austrian ruling dynasty of the Roman Catholic Habsburgs, for its physical independence against the Ottoman Turks and for its self-governance against the Kingdom of Hungary's powerful magnates. In 1620, Prince Gabriel Bethlen of Transylvania, a Protestant, was elected King of Hungary by the Diet meeting at Banská Bystrica.

The village of Radvaň, now a borough of Banská Bystrica, was granted the economically important right to hold annual fairs (Radvanský jarmok) in 1655. The fair was transferred to Banská Bystrica's main square in the 20th century. The copper deposits had been all but depleted by the 18th century, but new industries, such as timber, paper, and textiles, developed. In 1766, the city became the capital of Zólyom county; Banská Bystrica also became the seat of a Roman Catholic bishopric in 1776 and of several institutions of higher education. Public services expanded in the 19th century with the foundation of a permanent municipal hospital (1820), a municipal theater (1841), and a municipal museum (1889). The railway reached the town from Zvolen in 1873.

After Austria-Hungary lost the First World War, Banská Bystrica, along with the entire northern part of Hungary, was given to Czechoslovakia by the peace treaty of Trianon in 1920.

During World War II, Banská Bystrica became the center of anti-Nazi opposition in Slovakia when the Slovak National Uprising, one of the largest anti-Nazi resistance events in Europe, was launched from the city on 29 August 1944. The insurgents were defeated on 27 October, and Banská Bystrica was briefly occupied by German forces before it was liberated by Soviet and Romanian troops on 26 March 1945. After the war, Banská Bystrica became the administrative, economic, and cultural hub of central Slovakia. It has been a university town since the 1950s. Its largest, Matej Bel University, was founded in 1992.

== Geography ==
Banská Bystrica lies at an altitude of 368 metres (1,207 ft) above sea level and covers an area of 103.36 square kilometres (39.9 sq mi). It is about halfway between Slovakia's two largest cities, 208 kilometres (129 mi) north-east from Slovakia's capital Bratislava and 217 kilometres (135 mi) west of Košice. A chain of discrete suburbs and villages connects it with Zvolen, another major town 20 kilometres (12 mi) to the south.

Banská Bystrica is situated in the Hron River valley (Slovak: Pohronie). The Hron River curves through the city from the east to the south. The city nests among three mountain chains: the Low Tatras to the north-east, the Veľká Fatra to the north-west, and the Kremnica Mountains to the west. All three are protected areas because of their environmental value. Banská Bystrica hosts the headquarters of the Low Tatra National Park. Despite the proximity of these mountain ranges, the local landscape is dominated by the much lower Urpín Mountain, 510 metres (1,673 ft), which is a popular place of recreation.

Banská Bystrica lies in the north temperate zone and has a continental climate with four distinct seasons. It is characterized by a significant variation between hot summers and cold, snowy winters.

Climate data for Banská Bystrica (Sliač Airport) 1991−2020, extremes 1961–2020
Month	Jan	Feb	Mar	Apr	May	Jun	Jul	Aug	Sep	Oct	Nov	Dec	Year
Record high °C (°F)	13.3 (55.9)	17.9 (64.2)	24.7 (76.5)	30.4 (86.7)	32.3 (90.1)	35.8 (96.4)	37.8 (100.0)	37.8 (100.0)	34.5 (94.1)	28.3 (82.9)	21.5 (70.7)	15.5 (59.9)	37.8 (100.0)
Mean daily maximum °C (°F)	0.7 (33.3)	4.6 (40.3)	10.1 (50.2)	17.1 (62.8)	21.8 (71.2)	25.3 (77.5)	27.2 (81.0)	27.2 (81.0)	21.4 (70.5)	14.9 (58.8)	7.9 (46.2)	1.8 (35.2)	15.0 (59.0)
Daily mean °C (°F)	−2.6 (27.3)	−0.6 (30.9)	4.0 (39.2)	10.1 (50.2)	15.0 (59.0)	18.4 (65.1)	20.1 (68.2)	19.4 (66.9)	14.2 (57.6)	8.9 (48.0)	4.1 (39.4)	−1.3 (29.7)	9.1 (48.4)
Mean daily minimum °C (°F)	−6.2 (20.8)	−5.1 (22.8)	−1.1 (30.0)	3.1 (37.6)	7.8 (46.0)	11.6 (52.9)	13.2 (55.8)	12.7 (54.9)	8.5 (47.3)	4.4 (39.9)	0.7 (33.3)	−4.3 (24.3)	3.8 (38.8)
Record low °C (°F)	−30.0 (−22.0)	−27.4 (−17.3)	−26.2 (−15.2)	−7.3 (18.9)	−4.4 (24.1)	−0.2 (31.6)	2.7 (36.9)	0.0 (32.0)	−4.0 (24.8)	−10.8 (12.6)	−22.6 (−8.7)	−26.7 (−16.1)	−30.0 (−22.0)
Average precipitation mm (inches)	45.6 (1.80)	41.7 (1.64)	44.0 (1.73)	44.5 (1.75)	72.2 (2.84)	81.2 (3.20)	91.3 (3.59)	64.4 (2.54)	56.2 (2.21)	62.9 (2.48)	58.9 (2.32)	52.0 (2.05)	714.9 (28.15)
Average precipitation days (≥ 1.0 mm)	7.6	7.1	7.2	6.8	9.8	9.2	9.5	7.2	6.9	7.9	8.6	8.3	96.1
Average snowy days	11.8	9.6	5.8	1.2	0.0	0.0	0.0	0.0	0.0	0.6	4.1	9.3	42.4
Average relative humidity (%)	84.2	77.2	70.6	64.3	65.4	67.1	66.9	68.8	74.5	80.2	83.9	85.8	74.1
Mean monthly sunshine hours	64.1	93.7	151.2	200.9	241.0	247.1	270.7	255.6	172.0	113.4	62.1	52.0	1,923.8
Source: NOAA

== Population ==
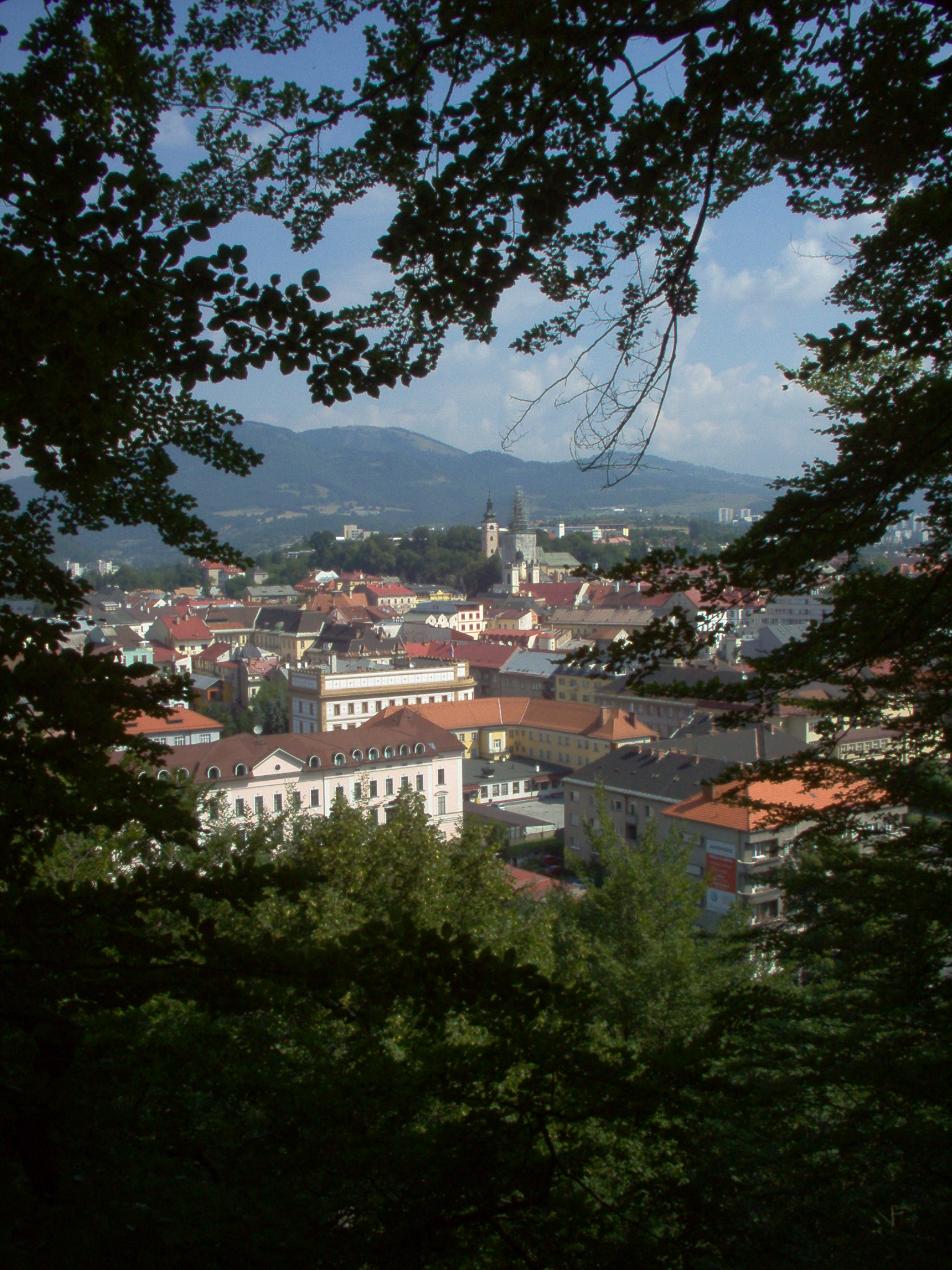
The old town, viewed from Urpín Mountain, is the core of the original settlement

Historical population
Year	Pop.	±%
1720	2,646	—
1869	25,950	+880.7%
1918	10,776	−58.5%
1950	22,651	+110.2%
1970	44,749	+97.6%
1980	62,688	+40.1%
1991	83,698	+33.5%
2001	83,056	−0.8%
2011	80,003	−3.7%
2021	76,018	−5.0%

Population statistic (10 years)
Year	1995	2005	2015	2025
Count	84,919	81,281	78,758	73,054
Difference		−4.28%	−3.10%	−7.24%

Population statistic
Year	2024	2025
Count	73,533	73,054
Difference		−0.65%

It has a population of 73,054 people (31 December 2025).

=== Ethnicity ===
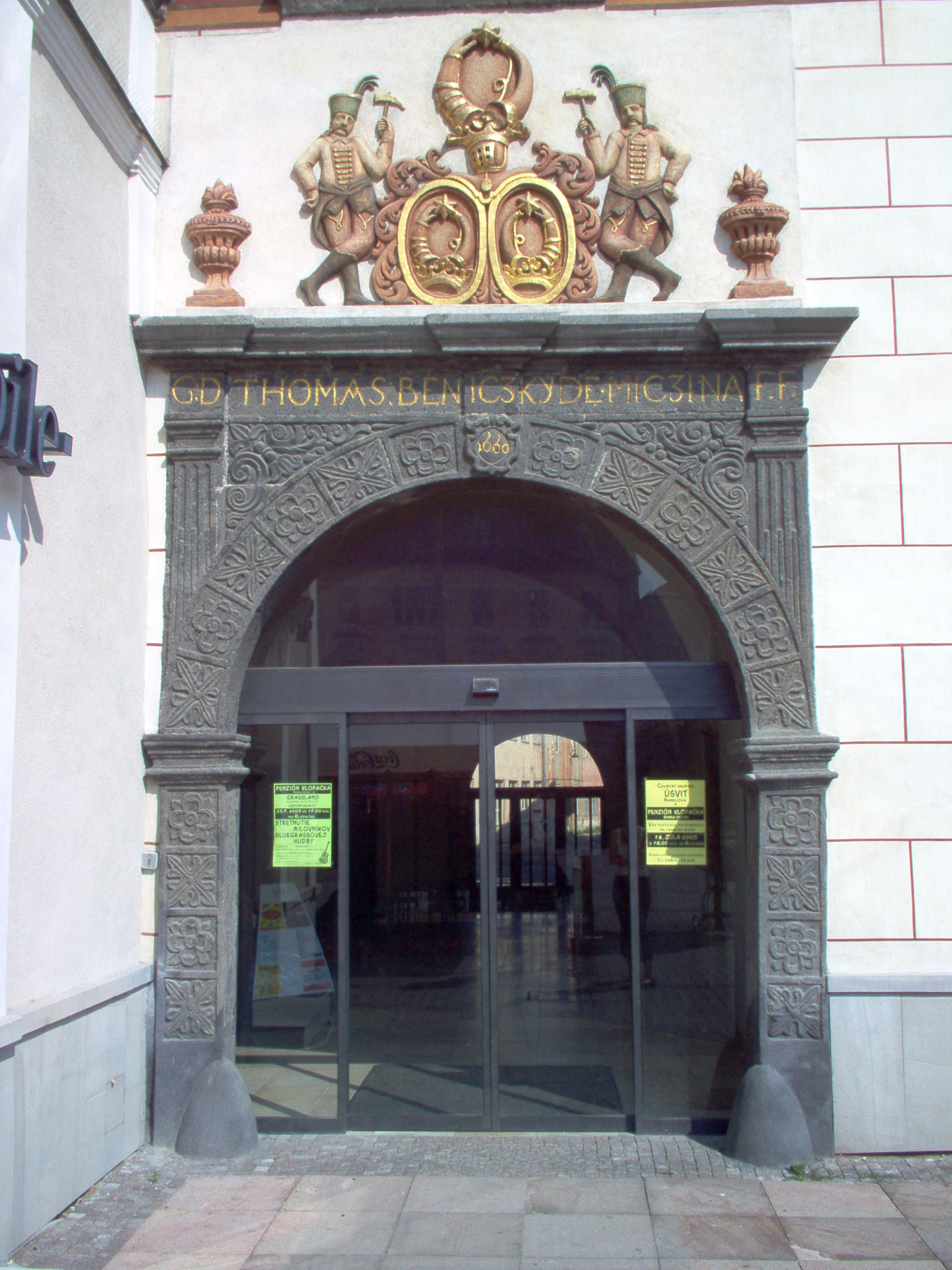
The lavish gate of the Beniczky House, owned by the Hungarian noble Beniczky family, (in Slovak Benický) on SNP Square displays a coat of arms of one of the aristocratic families from Banská Bystrica

Census 2021 (1+%)
Ethnicity	Number	Fraction
Slovak	70,320	92.5%
Not found out	4544	5.97%
Czech	1003	1.31%
Total	76,018	

In year 2021 was 76,018 people by ethnicity 70,320 as Slovak, 4544 as Not found out, 1003 as Czech, 398 as Hungarian, 341 as Romani, 339 as Other, 189 as Russian, 124 as Rusyn, 110 as German, 109 as Ukrainian, 67 as Polish, 39 as Vietnamese, 37 as Croatian, 36 as Italian, 36 as Moravian, 33 as Jewish, 30 as Serbian, 24 as Chinese, 24 as Romanian, 21 as Greek, 21 as English, 19 as French, 19 as Bulgarian, 16 as Turkish, 14 as Austrian, 13 as Albanian, 11 as Irish, 6 as Canadian, 4 as Iranian, 3 as Silesian and 1 as Korean.

Note on population: The difference values of population numbers in the table "Population statistic" and in the sections "Ethnicity" & "Religion" is caused by the use of various statistical methods.

Before World War II, the population of the city also included significant German, Hungarian, and Jewish minorities and many people were trilingual, mastering the Slovak, German, and Hungarian languages. The Jews resided for a long time in Radvaň because they used to be prohibited from entering the city. The synagogue in Banská Bystrica was built in 1867 and demolished in 1983.

Historical populations by ethnicity
Year	Slovaks	Germans	Hungarians
1715	1,899	873	279
1850	4,221	978	44
1910	4,388	?	5,261
1919	8,265	406	1,565
2001	78,700	53	446

=== Religion ===
Census 2021 (1+%)
Religion	Number	Fraction
None	32,391	42.61%
Roman Catholic Church	27,608	36.32%
Evangelical Church	7251	9.54%
Not found out	5046	6.64%
Greek Catholic Church	1020	1.34%
Total	76,018	

In year 2021 was 76,018 people by religion 32,391 from None, 27,608 from Roman Catholic Church, 7251 from Evangelical Church, 5046 from Not found out, 1020 from Greek Catholic Church, 359 from Other and not ascertained christian church, 343 from Ad hoc movements, 314 from Other, 245 from Eastern Orthodox Church, 193 from Christian Congregations in Slovakia, 192 from Seventh-day Adventist Church, 176 from Baptists Church, 148 from Buddhism, 147 from Jehovah's Witnesses, 115 from Church of the Brethren, 86 from Apostolic Church, 81 from Paganism and natural spirituality, 72 from Calvinist Church, 62 from Islam, 57 from United Methodist Church, 38 from Jewish community, 22 from Hinduism, 18 from Bahá'i Community, 15 from Old Catholic Church, 12 from Czechoslovak Hussite Church, 4 from Church of Jesus Christ of Latter-day Saints and 3 from New Apostolic Church.

== Economy ==
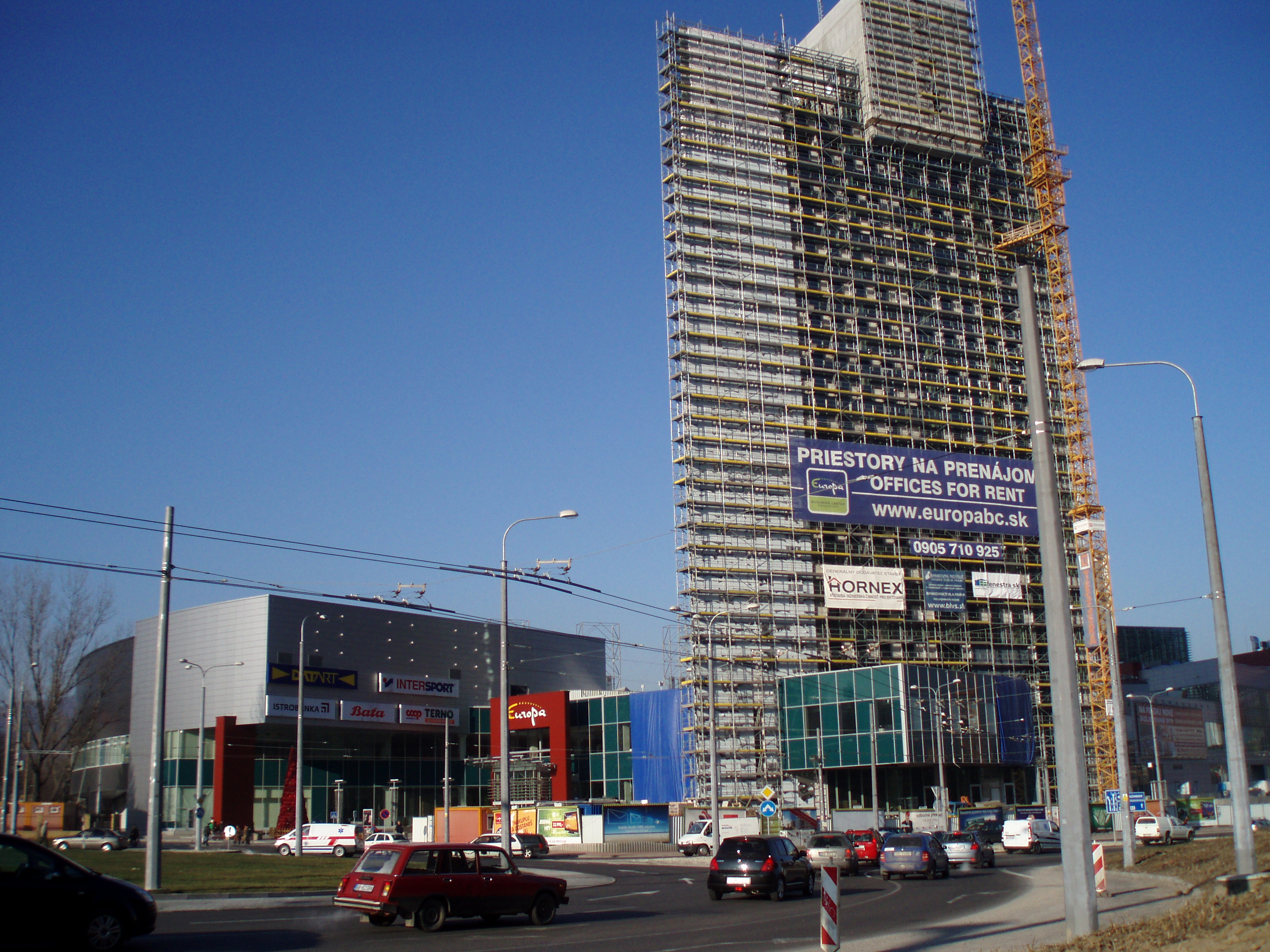
Banská Bystrica's economic growth, exemplified here by the construction of the Europa Business and Shopping Center (2007), mirrors the economic growth of Slovakia

While Banská Bystrica's prosperity used to be derived from copper mining in the distant past, the most important sectors of the local economy are now tourism, timber, and the mechanical industry. Two of the largest employers in Slovakia, Slovenská pošta (the public postal service, ranked as the 3rd largest employer) and Lesy SR (the national forest service, ranked as 13th). have their headquarters in Banská Bystrica. In the period 2007–2013, the city intended to work with Zvolen and other municipalities in the vicinity to jointly develop one of Slovakia's major metropolitan areas. The municipal strategy of economic development envisages Banská Bystrica as a regional center of tourism, services, administration, and entrepreneurship. The proclaimed three pillars of the future development are the natural and cultural heritage, information technologies, and infrastructure.

GDP per capita in 2001 was €3,643, which was below Slovakia's average (€4,400). GDP per capita for the Banská Bystrica Region (Banskobystrický kraj) in 2004 was PPS €10,148.70 (current euros), which was below Slovakia's average of PPS €12,196.20. More recent data disaggregated to the level of districts or municipalities are not available, but all of Slovakia's regional seats have per-capita GDPs above their regional averages. The unemployment rate in Banská Bystrica was 6.2% in December 2006, below the country's average of 9.4% at that time. The unemployment rate in the whole country has been decreasing since then, reaching 7.8% in November 2007.

The city has a balanced budget of more than one billion Slovak korunas (almost €33 million, as of 2007), with a small deficit of 37 million korunas. More than one-fifth of the budget was used for investment. The highest revenue comes from the income tax of persons (437 million korunas in 2006).

== Places of interest ==
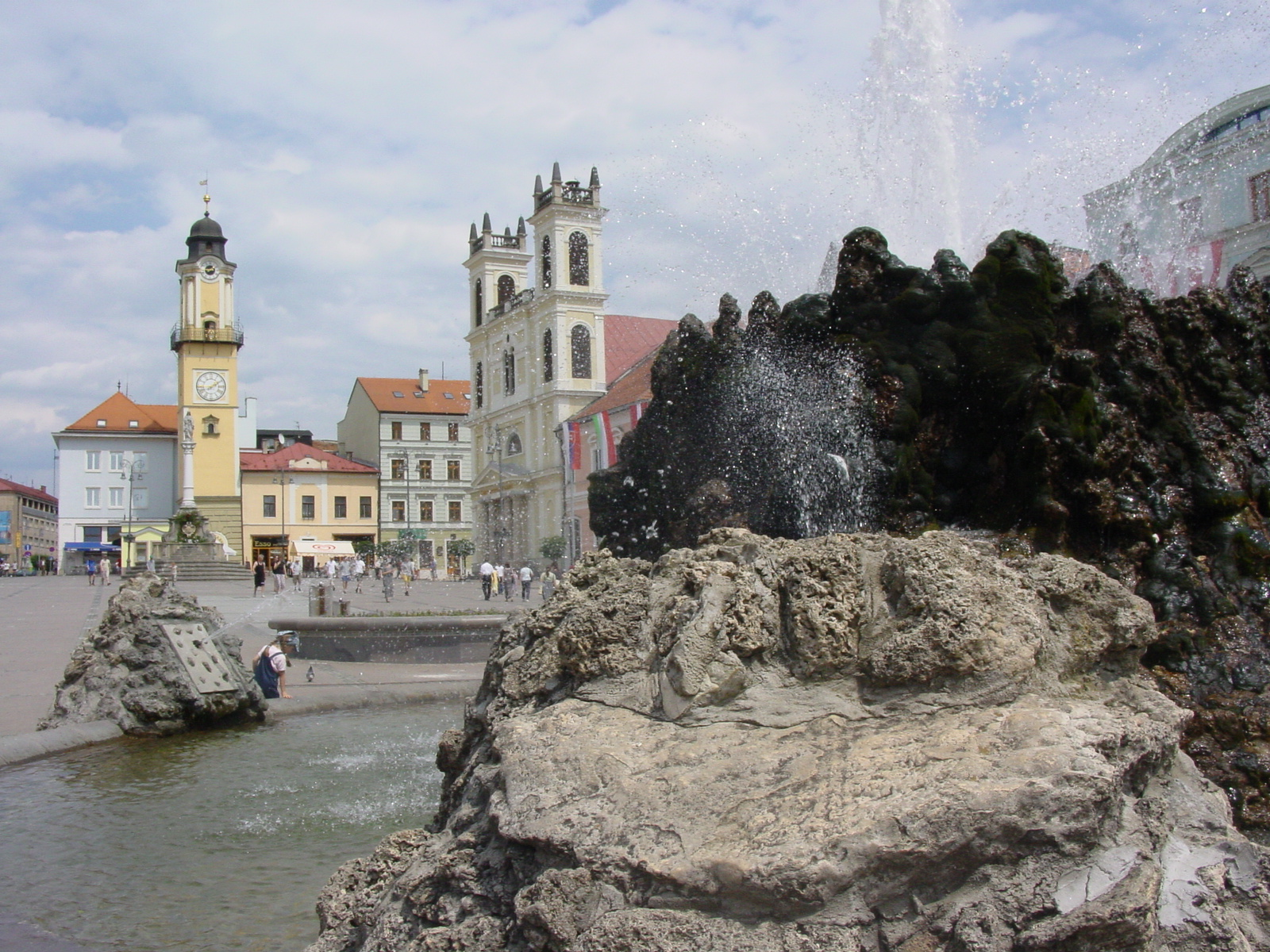
Námestie SNP is the natural center of the city

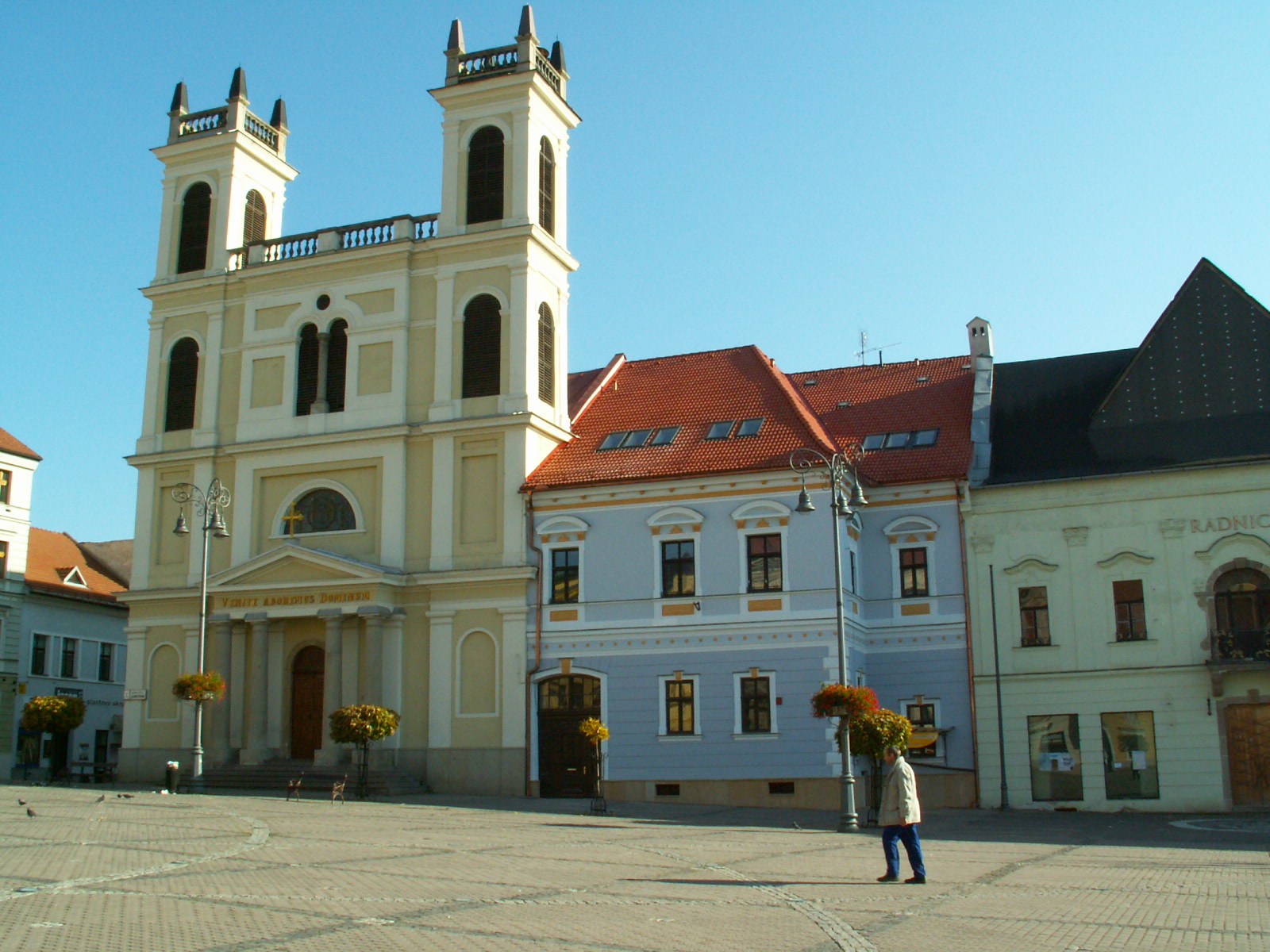
St. Francis Xavier Cathedral

Most of the historical monuments are concentrated near its central, picturesque SNP Square (Slovak: Námestie SNP). The square is named after the Slovak National Uprising. It is dominated by a clock tower built in 1552. Although less known than its famous counterpart in Pisa, it is a leaning tower with the top 40 centimetres (16 inches) off the perpendicular. A plague column (Slovak: Morový stĺp) was erected in the square in the 18th century in gratitude to the Virgin Mary for ending a deadly plague. The column was temporarily removed before a visit of the Soviet leader Nikita Khrushchev in 1964 because a religious symbol was considered too embarrassing a background for the Communist leader's speech. The St. Francis Xavier Cathedral (Slovak: Kapitulský kostol, "Chapter Church") is a copy of the Jesuit Church of the Gesu in Rome and is since 1776 the seat of the Roman Catholic Diocese of Banská Bystrica. Other major monuments on the square include an Art Nouveau fountain from the beginning of the 20th century and a black obelisk raised to honor the Soviet soldiers killed during the liberation of the city in 1945.

Most buildings enclosing the square and in the nearby streets are well-preserved Gothic, Renaissance, and Baroque noblemen's mansions and wealthy burghers' residences. The most interesting among them are the Benicky House and the Thurzo House, the latter hosting a museum with a regional archaeological collection and Gothic frescos. Most of the buildings in the center have been transformed into luxury stores, restaurants, and cafes. SNP Square itself was completely reconstructed in 1994.

The museum located at the Memorial of the Slovak National Uprising contains a large military collection, including an open-air exhibition of World War II tanks, artillery, aircraft, and armored trains.

Banská Bystrica also has a large network of marked hiking trails all around the city. In wintertime, it attracts fans of cross-country skiing and downhill skiing, as there are several ski resorts close to the city, including the Donovaly resort famous for dogsled racing.

=== Town castle ===
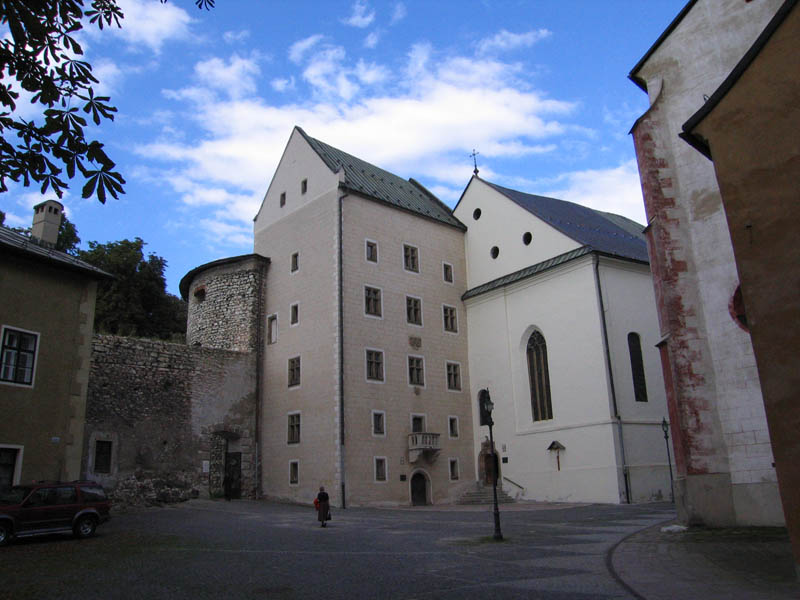
House (Matejov dom) and Holy Cross Church

The oldest part of Banská Bystrica is the town castle at the edge of SNP Square. It is enclosed within what has remained of its original fortifications − a barbican protecting the main gate, three bastions, and part of the walls. The town castle served as the town's administrative center, and it also protected the king's treasury. The Parish Church (Slovak: Farský kostol) of the Assumption of the Virgin Mary built in the Romanesque and Gothic styles contains precious Gothic altars and sculptures. One of the altars was carved by the famous Master Paul of Levoča. The church was built in the 13th century. It is still surrounded by remnants of its ancient cemetery. The neighboring Church of the Holy Cross was built in 1452 by the Slovak burghers as a counterpart to the Church of the Virgin Mary that then acquired the attribute German. The Matthias House (Slovak: Matejov dom) was built in 1479 as a five-story late-Gothic structure with a Gothic portal and stone console balcony. It served as a temporary residence of King Matthias Corvinus and his Queen Consort Beatrix. The Renaissance Old Town Hall, dating from 1500, has been transformed into an art museum.

== Culture ==
There are four theaters in Banská Bystrica. The State Opera (Slovak: Štátna opera v Banskej Bystrici) was founded in 1959. It has given the opera world several divas, Edita Gruberová being the most famous one. Every summer, the State Opera organizes a popular open-air festival at Zvolen Castle. Divadlo Štúdio Tanca is a professional contemporary dance theater established in 1998. A professional marionette theater, Bábkové divadlo na Rázcestí (Puppet Theater at the Fork in the Road) founded in 1960, organizes the only marionette festival in Slovakia. Theatre from the Passage (Slovak: Divadlo z Pasáže) is Slovakia's only theater with a mentally disabled cast whose mission is to help integrate mentally disabled people in society.

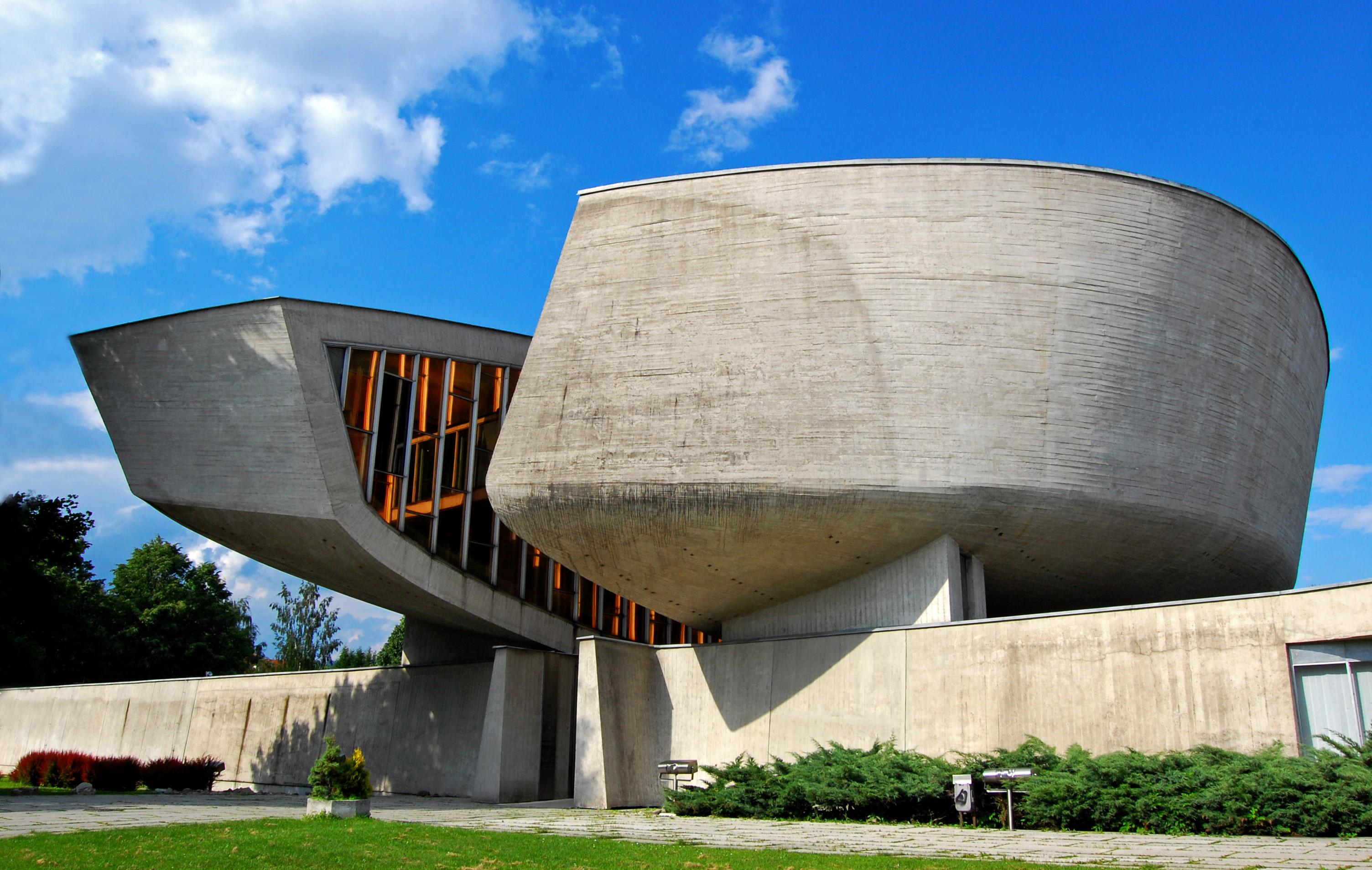
Museum of the Slovak National Uprising

The oldest museum in the city is the Central Slovakia Museum (Slovak: Stredoslovenské múzeum), founded in 1889. Its historical exposition is located in the Thurzo House on SNP Square, while the natural history exposition is in the Tihányi Mansion in Radvaň. The Old Town Hall building at City Castle hosts the State Gallery (Slovak: Štátna Galéria) specialized in contemporary Slovak art. The Museum of the Slovak National Uprising (Slovak: Múzeum Slovenského národného povstania) features a collection of 203,000 militaria, including an open-air exhibition of World War II heavy weapons. Other noteworthy museums are the regional Literature and Music Museum (Slovak: Literárne a hudobné múzeum) and Slovakia's only Postal Museum (Slovak: Poštové múzeum Slovenskej pošty).

The town is the setting for the book St Peter's Umbrella by Kálmán Mikszáth, published in 1895. The book was part of a large increase in Hungarian writing at the time, which was symptomatic of the rise in Hungarian separatism against what was seen as the oppression of the German Habsburgs.

From 22 to 28 February 1959, the first festival of Czechoslovak cinema was presented in Banská Bystrica. While it was planned by Český film as a showcase of the national film production, it turned into a tribunal for those films that did not fit the ideological guidelines of the Communist Party. Several films were banned, among them: Tri prání directed by Ján Kadár and Elmar Klos, Zde jsou lvi by Václav Krška, Hvezda jede na jih by Oldrich Lipský and Konec jasnovidce by Vladimír Svitáček and Ján Roháč.

There are four folklore ensembles for adults and three for children. Their aim is to preserve and present Slovak folklore traditions, especially the traditional music. The oldest one is the award-winning Urpín Folklore Ensemble, founded in 1957. Mladosť Folklore Ensemble is affiliated with Matej Bel University.

== Government ==
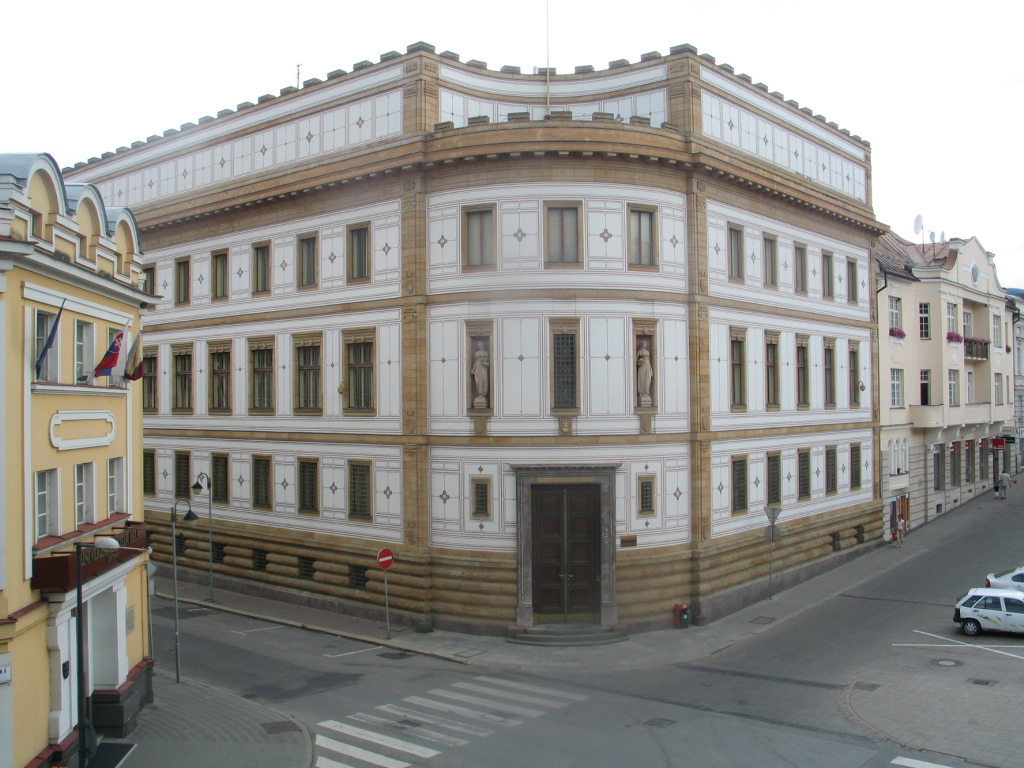
The regional branch of the National Bank of Slovakia in Banská Bystrica

The city is governed by a mayor (Slovak: primátor) and a city council (Slovak: mestské zastupiteľstvo). The mayor is the head of the city and its chief executive. The term of office is for four years. The current mayor, following the 2014 municipal elections, is Ján Nosko, an independent. Banská Bystrica is divided into four electoral districts, consisting of the following neighborhoods:

1. Staré mesto, Uhlisko, Prednádražie, Šalková, Senica, Majer (7 councilors)
2. Kráľová, Iliaš, Kremnička, Rakytovce (4 councilors)
3. Radvaň, Fončorda, Podlavice, Skubín (11 councilors)
4. Sásová, Rudlová, Uľanka, Jakub, Kostiviarska (10 councilors)

Banská Bystrica is the capital of one of eight largely autonomous Regions of Slovakia. It was the capital of an even larger region encompassing the whole of central Slovakia from 1960 until 1990, but the territory was subdivided in 1996 between the Banská Bystrica and Žilina regions, and a part of Trenčín region. Banská Bystrica is also the capital of a smaller district. The Banská Bystrica District (Slovak: okres Banská Bystrica) is entirely contained within the Banská Bystrica Region (Slovak: Banskobystrický kraj).

Several national public institutions have their headquarters in the city, the most prominent are the Tax Directorate of the Slovak Republic and the Slovak public postal service (Slovenská pošta). The city also hosts a regional branch of National Bank of Slovakia.

== Education ==
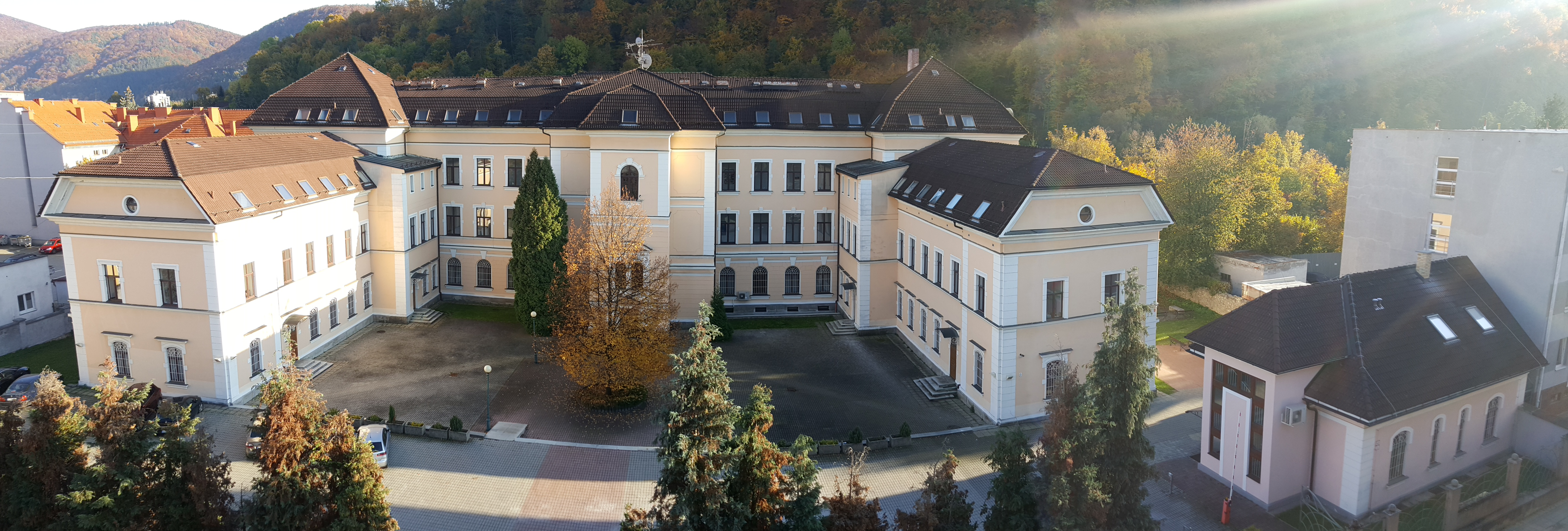
Matej Bel University

Banská Bystrica is the home of Matej Bel University (Slovak: Univerzita Mateja Bela) with 16,460 students, including 416 doctoral students. Academy of Arts (Slovak: Akadémia umení) with 490 students is specialized in performing and fine arts. A satellite campus of the Slovak Medical University is also located in the city.

There are 15 public primary schools, two private primary schools, and two religious primary schools. Overall, they enroll 7,029 pupils. The city's system of secondary education (some middle schools and all high schools) consists of five gymnasia with 3,280 students, seven specialized high schools with 2,873 students, and six vocational schools with 1,884 students.

The largest library is the State Scientific Library with 2 million volumes. The geological institute of the Slovak Academy of Sciences has a branch in Banská Bystrica, and the small Banská Bystrica Regional Astronomical Observatory is located on Urpín Mountain.

== Transportation ==
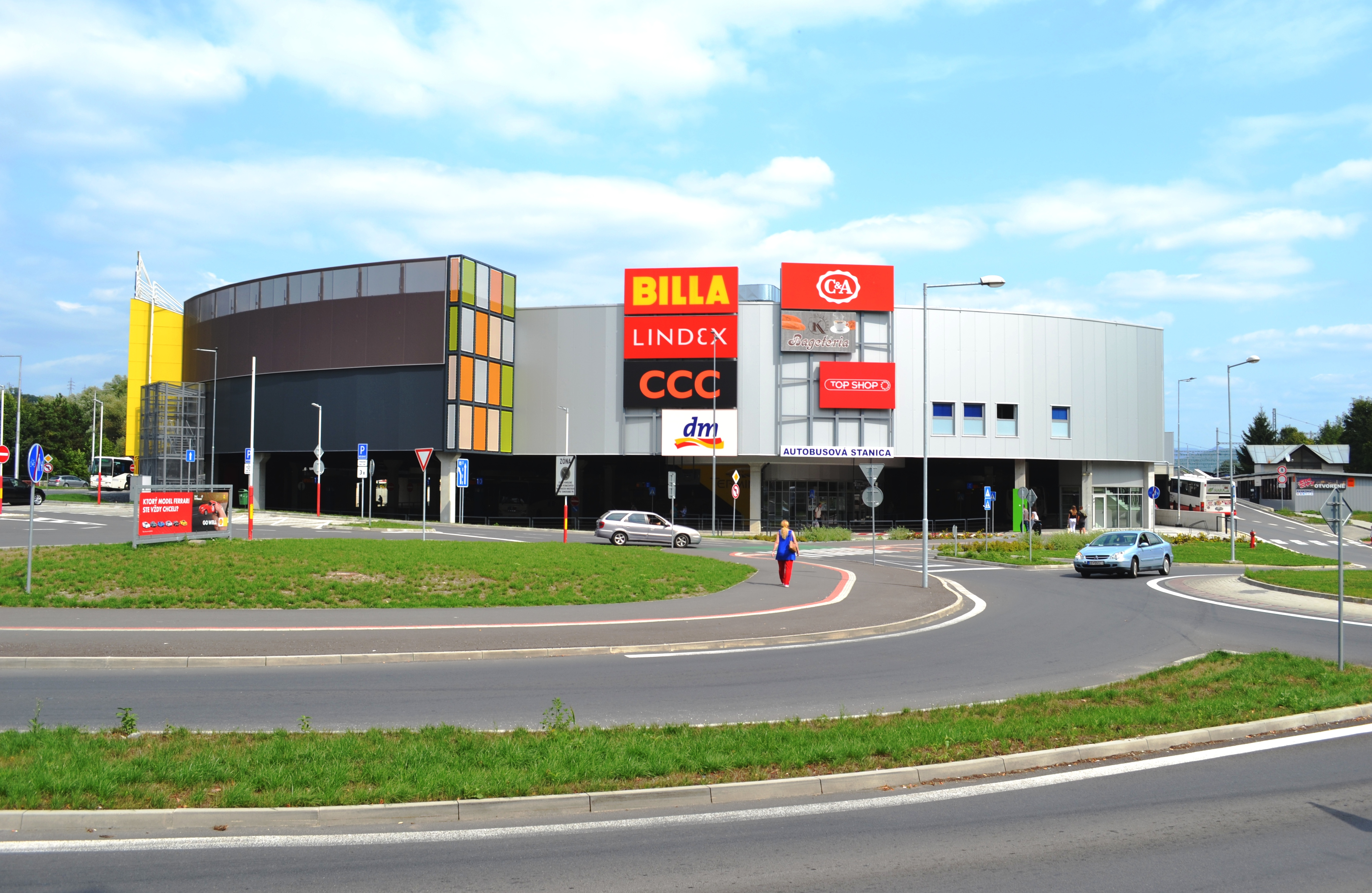
Terminal Shopping Center Bus station in Banská Bystrica

Banská Bystrica has bus and train connections to the rest of the country, as well as to many other European cities.

The R1 expressway connects the city to Zvolen and to Slovakia's capital, Bratislava. Other roads of state importance connect the city to Brezno (No. 66), to Ružomberok (No. 59) and to Turčianske Teplice (No. 14).

Banská Bystrica railway station is a junction between the Vrútky–Zvolen railway, which links Banská Bystrica with Žilina and Bratislava, and the Banská Bystrica–Červená Skala railway, which heads east towards Košice. Banská Bystrica mesto railway station is a smaller station located closer to the city centre, served by trains on the Vrútky-Zvolen line.

Public transport in the city is managed by two different companies. Dopravný podnik mesta Banská Bystrica is a public service run by the municipality. It operates trolleybuses and minibuses. The private company SAD Zvolen has a fleet of buses. In addition to regular lines, it also offers express and night lines. 30% of people use their private cars for journeys to work, and the average commute time is 35 minutes.

== Sport ==
FK Dukla Banská Bystrica is the local football club, playing in the top Slovak football league, the Niké Liga. The city is also home to the Extraliga ice hockey club HC 05 Banská Bystrica.

The Národný Atletický Štadión is a multi-purpose stadium, used mainly for athletics and football matches, and is the home ground of Dukla Banská Bystrica. Built in 1959, the stadium underwent a complete reconstruction in 2018. Motorcycle speedway was held around the football pitch on the site from 1959 to 1966 and the stadium hosted a final round of the Czechoslovak Individual Speedway Championship in 1959 and 1960. In February 1936, the Winter Maccabiah Games were held in Banská Bystrica.

== Twin towns – sister cities ==
Banská Bystrica is twinned with:

- Alba, Italy (since 1967)
- Budva, Montenegro (since 2001)
- Charleston, United States (since 2010)
- Dabas, Hungary (since 2000)
- Durham, England, United Kingdom (since 1967)
- Halberstadt, Germany (since 1998)
- Herzliya, Israel (since 1995)
- Hradec Králové, Czech Republic (since 1967)
- Kovačica, Serbia (since 2002)
- Larissa, Greece (since 1988)
- Mangalia, Romania (since 2006)
- Montana, Bulgaria (since 1995)
- Radom, Poland (since 2001)
- Salgótarján, Hungary (since 1967)
- Tarnobrzeg, Poland (since 1995)
- Tula, Russia (since 1967)
- Vršac, Serbia (since 2004)
- Zadar, Croatia (since 1995)

=== Other forms of cooperation ===
- Ascoli Piceno, Italy (since 1998)
- Jyväskylä, Finland (since 2006)
- Sumy, Ukraine (since 2016)
- Shenyang, China (since 2006)

== Genealogical resources ==
The records for genealogical research are available at the state archive in Banská Bystrica (Slovak: Štátny archív v Banskej Bystrici).

- Roman Catholic church records (births/marriages/deaths): 1628–1900 (parish A)
- Lutheran church records (births/marriages/deaths): 1743–1920 (parish A)

== See also ==
- List of famous people from Banská Bystrica
- List of municipalities and towns in Slovakia
