= Nicholas Apáti =

Hungarian prelate

- Archbishop of Esztergom
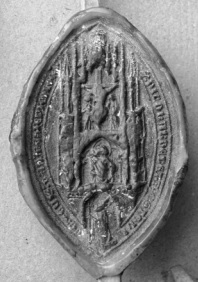
- Seal of Nicholas Apáti, 1358
- Installed: 1358
- Term ended: 1366
- Predecessor: Nicholas Vásári
- Successor: Thomas Telegdi
- Other posts: Provost of Esztergom; Bishop of Nyitra; Bishop of Zagreb; Archbishop of Kalocsa; Chancellor

Personal details
- Died: c. November 1366
- Denomination: Catholic
- Parents: Clement

Nicholas Apáti (also Keszei; Hungarian: Apáti Miklós, Croatian: Nikola Apáti; died November/December 1366) was a Hungarian prelate of the Catholic Church in the 14th century, who served as Archbishop of Esztergom from 1358 until his death. He previously served as the bishop of Nitra from 1347 to 1350, Zagreb from 1350 to 1356 and Kalocsa from 1356 to 1358.

== Ancestry and early life ==
His origin is uncertain; it is possible he was born into a serf family, which originated from Bars County. His father was a certain Clement. He had a brother, Lawrence, and a sister, Elizabeth. Early ecclesiastical scholars – church historians Ferenc Kollányi, Árpád Bossányi and genealogist Mór Wertner – identified him as a member of the Frankói family and called him with the surname "de Franko" or "Frankói". Nicholas' first biographer Antal Pór, however, proved that he had no kinship relationship with the noble family. Instead, he suggested the "Keszei" surname because Judge royal Thomas Szécsényi donated the land of Kesző or Keszi (Garamkeszi; present-day Hronské Kosihy, Slovakia) to him in August 1351, which act was confirmed by Louis I of Hungary in February 1365. Mór Wertner objected to Pór's arbitrary name selection and, also revising his earlier position, suggested the "Lévai" family name because the prelate's two nephews appeared with the "de Lewa" suffix. Despite this, the name of Keszei has spread in historical literature. Modern historians – including Kornél Szovák, Pál Engel and Enikő Csukovits – began to use the "Apáti" family name.

According to the donation mentioned above letter of Thomas Szécsényi, Apáti served faithfully first Charles I, then his son Louis I. The latter king stated in his confirmation charter that Apáti was in the service of the royal court "since almost his childhood". As a result, theologian József Udvardy considered Apáti to come from the lower nobility. His biographer Antal Pór wrote that Apáti began his career at the royal chancellery. It is plausible that he did not attend a foreign universitas because Pope Clement VI did not mention his academic skills during his appointment as Bishop of Zagreb. However, he gained useful practical and administrative experience over the years he spent in the royal court. He was referred to as parson of Szőlős, then a member of the collegiate chapter of Zagreb.

== Early career ==
By early 1349, Apáti elevated to the grand provost of Esztergom. Subsequently, he was made Bishop of Nyitra (present-day Nitra, Slovakia) by 18 May 1349, but soon he was replaced by Stephen Frankói still in that year. Meanwhile, Apáti also served as head (count) of the royal chapel (Latin: comes capellae regiae) from 1349 to 1351. In this quality, he supervised the convent of the royal chaplains, guarded the royal relic treasures and exercised jurisdiction over those servant laymen who secured the liturgical activity of the court clergy. He also served as keeper of the royal seal and director of the place of authentication in the royal court. Apáti was transferred to the Diocese of Zagreb on 11 January 1350 by Pope Clement. Apáti escorted Louis I when the Hungarian monarch departed for his second Neapolitan campaign in April 1350. After the fall of Aversa to Hungarian troops on 3 August, Apáti was consecrated as bishop in the town. The Hungarian troops, including Apáti, arrived in Buda on 25 October 1350.

Apáti actively participated in the last phase of the conversion of the pagan Cumans, who had settled in Hungary a century before, which was completed during the reign of Louis. Apáti was made vice-chancellor in the second half of 1351, following the death of the long-time office-holder Thatamerius. Louis I held a Diet around the same time, in late 1351. As vice-chancellor, Apáti was a draftsman of that law (later called ius viaticum), which confirmed all provisions of the Golden Bull of 1222, save the one that authorized childless noblemen to freely will their estates. The law introduced an entail system, which existed until the Hungarian Revolution of 1848, prescribing that childless noblemen's landed property "should descend to their brothers, cousins and kinsmen". His family was granted the land Kesző for Apáti's legislative role during the diet. However, Nicholas Vásári, the Archbishop of Esztergom, objected to the king's decision, which resulted in a lawsuit between the two prelates. Soon, Vásári acknowledged the rightful donation of the possession. Apáti was considered a faithful confidant of Louis. The Hungarian monarch interceded at the Roman Curia in the bishop's interest on 1 July 1352, when he requested Pope Clement to authorize confessional grace and absolution in certain cases to the Diocese of Zagreb. Apáti also received permission from the papal court to freely donate two benefices within the chapters of Zagreb and Čazma (Csázma). Upon the intervention of Louis, Apáti's nephews were also able to become canons of the collegiate chapter of Zagreb. Apáti successfully recovered the fortress of Medvedgrad for his diocese in February 1352, but it proved to be a short-lived growth. The royal chronicler John of Küküllő started his career under the guidance of Apáti in the early 1350s. John led Apáti's episcopal chancellery since 1353.

== Archbishop of Kalocsa ==
Nicholas Apáti was transferred to the dignity of Archbishop of Kalocsa on 4 August 1356, ending one year of vacancy. He sent John, son of Nicholas, the archdeacon of Syrmia to Avignon for his pallium in October. In that year, Louis invaded Venetian territories without a formal declaration of war. He also laid siege to Treviso on 27 July. Apáti also resided in the province with his military unit. Pope Innocent VI strongly opposed the war and urged the Venetians to make peace with Hungary. He sent Bongiovanni de Campello, the Bishop of Fermo to mediate between the two sides. Louis I commissioned Apáti to represent his interests in the armistice negotiations. The Republic of Venice proposed "uti possidetis", but the Hungarians demanded the recovery of Zadar. The papal envoy travelled to Venice to agree with the Signoria and asked Apáti to wait for his answer in Sacile. The negotiations took longer than expected, and Apáti reported that his money ran out to finance his banderium in the Italian province further. Apáti left Sacile and he was replaced as chief negotiator by Nicolaus of Luxemburg, the Patriarch of Aquileia. Pope Innocent made Louis the "standard-bearer of the Church". He granted him a three-year tithe to fight in the crusade against Francesco Ordelaffi and other rebellious lords in the Papal States. The pope called Apáti and his suffragans to provide their ecclesiastical benefices and taxes to finance his military goals.

Returning home, Apáti was created chancellor of the royal court around November 1356, holding that position until his death. According to historian Imre Szentpétery, Apáti adopted the title, which indicated a more influential and worthy dignity, but in fact, continued the same work as his years as vice-chancellor of the royal court. Since the late 13th century, the vice-chancellors were considered de facto managers of the chancellery, while the chancellor's office depreciated into an honorary title. Apáti, when he was appointed Archbishop of Kalocsa, restored the old function of the chancellor during his term of office (since the early 13th century, the office was usually held by the archbishops of Kalocsa). According to Bernát L. Kumorovitz, the chancellery consisted of several departments during the reign of Louis I. When Apáti was elevated to the archbishopric, the office of vice-chancellor became a degrading title, which would have suggested a setback among the office-holders in the royal court.

Apáti again visited Avignon in early 1357, where he spent the following months until August. He paid his appointment fee at the papal court and arranged the debt of his predecessor, Denis Lackfi. Because of his role as adviser and councillor in the royal court, Apáti rarely stayed in his archdiocese in the following years. He had no auxiliary bishops who could substitute for him in Kalocsa, so he requested that the pope authorize him to consecrate priests and celebrate mass in the whole territory of the kingdom. Pope Innocent approved these privileges for Apáti on 26 July 1357. Still, he limited his authority within the borders of the Archdiocese of Kalocsa to avoid conflicts of jurisdiction with other prelates in Hungary. In the same document, the pope also granted four or five years of indulgence for those penitents who went on a pilgrimage to the Assumption Cathedral of Kalocsa, which building, a "poor and formless church" has been neglected in recent decades. Apáti also requested his superior to authorize his pilgrimage to the Holy Sepulchre with a forty-member escort. However, Apáti never visited the Holy Land. Due to the contribution of the pope, Apáti successfully recovered the archbishopric's lands in Hont and Gömör counties in August 1357, which were exchanged by one of his predecessors, Ladislaus Jánki in the occasion of a disadvantageous contract with Thomas Szécsényi in 1334. A supplication also contains information on Apáti's health condition: because of his physical weakness and the poor digestive system of his stomach, he requested the pope to receive an exemption from that Hungarian tradition during fasting, when practices the faithful abstain from eating eggs, milk and any dairy or animal products. Pope Innocent said that Apáti should have acted on the advice of his court physician.

== Archbishop of Esztergom ==
Nicholas Vásári, the Archbishop of Esztergom, died in the middle of 1358. Apáti was nominated as his successor on 23 August at the latest. As Archbishop of Kalocsa, he was replaced by Thomas Telegdi on 25 August. On 21 September 1358, Apáti, as postulated Archbishop of Esztergom, presided over the investigating court over the charges of disloyalty and betrayal against John, the lector of the Roman Catholic Diocese of Bosnia. When relations between Tvrtko I of Bosnia and Louis I worsened, Bishop Peter Siklósi took Louis's side. He actively supported the calls for a new crusade against Bosnia, earning Tvrtko's hostility. The Ban even attempted to plot against him, corresponding to that end with John in Đakovo. Peter discovered the letters and had the lector imprisoned. Apáti summoned a trial to Bács (present-day Bač, Serbia), also attended by some Hungarian prelates and other secular lords. During the process, John acknowledged his guilt and pledged loyalty to Louis I. Pope Innocent transferred Apáti to the Archdiocese of Esztergom on 8 October 1358.

King Louis I's first seal, infamously stolen from Nicholas Apáti's tent during the campaign against Bosnia

Immediately after his appointment, he held a national synod in Esztergom at the beginning of 1359. There, he demanded the presence of the provost of Székesfehérvár, who had to acknowledge the supremacy of the Archdiocese of Esztergom upon the instruction of Pope Innocent. Apáti visited the papal court at Avignon in the first half of 1359. Pope Innocent authorized him to inaugurate the prelates in the Kingdom of Hungary. The historian John of Küküllő became a member of the cathedral chapter and Apáti's vicar in Esztergom. Sometime in the following years, he was referred to as "lord chancellor" by royal documents, for instance, in June 1364, July 1365 and July 1366. However, there is no consistency in the denomination of the various offices in the royal court. Thus, this title possibly reflects only Apáti's influential position in the royal court. Historian Pál Engel considered the Hungarian cardinal, Demetrius as the first Lord Chancellor of Hungary, adopting the title in 1377.

The archbishop participated in the military campaign against Tvrtko when Louis invaded Bosnia from two directions in the spring of 1363. An army under the command of Palatine Nicholas Kont and Archbishop Nicholas Apáti laid siege to Srebrenik in northern Bosnia, but the fortress did not surrender. Apáti took the royal seal to his military camp, which was stolen during the siege by his servants and sold it to a goldsmith, who resided in Beszterce (present-day Bistrița, Romania). A new seal was made, and all Louis's former charters were to be confirmed with the new seal, which was guarded by Apáti, too. The army under Louis's personal command besieged Sokolac on Pliva in July, but could not capture it. Hungarian troops returned to Hungary in the same month.

Meanwhile, Pope Urban V proclaimed a crusade against the Muslim powers of the Mediterranean upon Peter I of Cyprus's request on 31 March 1363. He levied a three-year tithe on the church revenues in Hungary and asked Louis to support the papal officials to collect the tax. However, Louis I and Palatine Kont made every effort to hinder the activities of the papal tax collectors, stating that he needed resources to cover the costs of his future wars against the infidels and the pope's enemies in Italy. Therefore, Pope Urban urged Apáti to overpersuade his king to withdraw his decision and support the crusade. Apáti was not enthusiastic and tried to prolong the execution of the command; therefore, the Holy See expressed its displeasure towards him. Nicholas Apáti died between 20 November and 2 December 1266.

== Sources ==
- Dobronić, Lelja (1995). "Nikola I. [Nicholas I]". In Franko, Mirošević (ed.). Zagrebački biskupi i nadbiskupi [Bishops and Archbishops of Zagreb] (in Croatian). Školska knjiga. pp. 123–126. ISBN 953-0-60597-8.
- Engel, Pál (1996). Magyarország világi archontológiája, 1301–1457, I. [Secular Archontology of Hungary, 1301–1457, Volume I] (in Hungarian). História, MTA Történettudományi Intézete. ISBN 963-8312-44-0.
- Hegedűs, András (2003). "V. Miklós [Nicholas V]". In Beke, Margit (ed.). Esztergomi érsekek 1001–2003 [Archbishops of Esztergom 1001–2003] (in Hungarian). Szent István Társulat. pp. 175–179. ISBN 963-361-472-4.
- Markó, László (2006). A magyar állam főméltóságai Szent Istvántól napjainkig: Életrajzi Lexikon [Great Officers of State in Hungary from King Saint Stephen to Our Days: A Biographical Encyclopedia] (in Hungarian). Helikon Kiadó. ISBN 963-208-970-7.
- Udvardy, József (1991). A kalocsai érsekek életrajza (1000–1526) [Biographies of Archbishops of Kalocsa, 1000–1526] (in Hungarian). Görres Gesellschaft.

Political offices
| Preceded by John Garai | Head of the royal chapel 1349–1351 | Succeeded by Ladislaus Zsámboki |
| Preceded by Thatamerius | Vice-chancellor; 1351–1356 | Succeeded by Ladislaus Zsámboki |
| Preceded by Stephen Harkácsi | Chancellor; 1356–1366 | Succeeded by Demetrius |
Catholic Church titles
| Preceded by Nicholas Vásári | Bishop of Nyitra; 1349 | Succeeded by Stephen Frankói |
| Preceded by Denis Lackfi | Bishop of Zagreb; 1350–1356 | Succeeded by Stjepan Kaniški |
| Preceded by Denis Lackfi | Archbishop of Kalocsa; 1356–1358 | Succeeded by Thomas Telegdi |
| Preceded by Nicholas Vásári | Archbishop of Esztergom; 1358–1366 | Succeeded by Thomas Telegdi |
