= Coloman (bishop of Győr) =

Hungarian prelate (1317–1375)

- Bishop of Győr
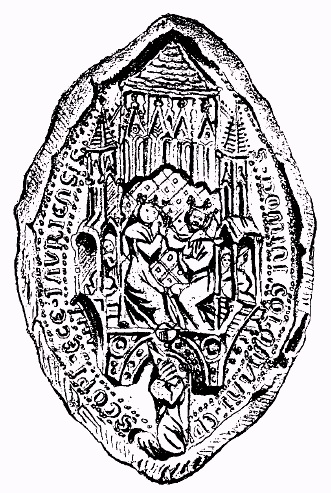
- Seal of Coloman of Győr (1355)
- Church: Roman Catholic
- Diocese: Győr
- Installed: 6 May 1337
- Term ended: 1375
- Predecessor: Nicholas Kőszegi
- Successor: John de Surdis

Orders
- Consecration: 1338

Personal details
- Born: c. 1317
- Died: 1375
- Parents: Charles I of Hungary; Elizabeth Csák (?)

Coloman (Hungarian: Kálmán; c. 1317 – 1375) was a Hungarian prelate who served as bishop of Győr from 1337 to 1375. He was the illegitimate son of King Charles I of Hungary. He was imprisoned from 1353 to 1358/59 on suspicion of having conspired against Charles's successor Louis I, but subsequently released and allowed to continue in office.

== Life ==
=== Early career ===
Coloman was born around 1317 to Charles I and his concubine, who resided in the royal summer residence in Csepel Island, according to the chronicles of Dubnic and Pressburg. Based on depictions of the five keystones on the gate of the Old Town Hall in Bratislava (Pressburg), historian Antal Pór identified her as Elizabeth, the daughter of Gurke, a member of the noble Csák kindred. As a royal standard-bearer, Gurke participated in the Battle of Rozgony in 1312, where he was killed. Hungarian historiography roughly accepted this identification.

Despite Coloman's illegitimacy, Charles favoured him and arranged for his education to be overseen by Bishop Ivánka of Várad, allowing him the use of the title "prince" and the Hungarian royal seal of the House of Anjou. His other tutor was Paul, a canon of Várad. The young Coloman was destined for a church career by his father, preventing any possible future conflict over the Hungarian throne. In early 1334, Charles requested Pope John XXII to acquit Coloman from illegitimate origin and young age. Coloman took up his first ecclesiastical office at the age of 15 as a canon at Várad in 1332, and became the grand provost of Esztergom in 1335, while he was only ordained as a deacon. Coloman also possessed benefices in the cathedral chapter of Székesfehérvár.

=== Bishop of Győr ===
The long-time reigning bishop Nicholas Kőszegi, who had become embroiled in conflict with Charles I several times, died in the late spring-early summer of 1336. At the king's instigation—and despite his young age and a substantial clerical opposition at Győr—Pope Benedict XII installed Coloman to the bishopric of Győr by a bull of 6 May 1337, dispensing him from his impediments (illegitimate origin and young age), after Coloman was "elected by compromise" by the local chapter. This appointment was part of a broader policy on Charles's part to replace Hungarian bishops who had disagreed with his ecclesiastical policies with more reliable men. On 12 June 1337, the pope authorized any Hungarian prelates to ordain Coloman a priest then consecrate him a bishop. Coloman's consecration, however, did not take place until late 1338; the Anjou Legendarium may have been prepared as a gift for him on that occasion.

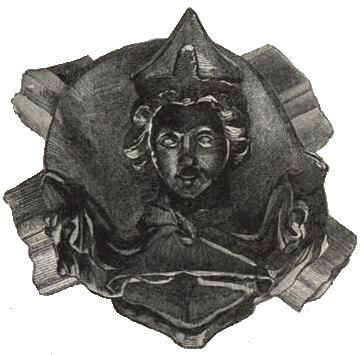
Antal Pór claimed that a keystone of the Old Town Hall in Bratislava depicts Coloman as a young bishop

Charles I died in 1342, and a different political situation prevailed at the court of the new king, Louis I. Coloman may have faced the opposition of the queen's mother in particular, Charles's widow Elizabeth of Poland, on account of his illegitimate birth. At any rate, he served at Louis's side in the Neapolitan campaign of 1350, but he was imprisoned soon afterwards in early 1353, accused of a treasonous conspiracy against the king. Coloman was held under the custody of Archbishop Nicholas Vásári in Esztergom. The details of the alleged conspiracy, including its factuality, are unclear: historians have debated whether Coloman harboured ambitions against his half-brother the king, or was merely the victim of political persecution. This event provoked the reigning pope, Innocent VI, to launch an investigation of his case, entrusting Vásári and Arnošt of Pardubice, Archbishop of Prague. Legal proceedings continued until at least 1358, and a papal bull of 26 March that year was highly critical of Coloman. Nevertheless, he was set free by the king by 1359. A missive from Pope Urban V on 3 September 1364, requesting him to take part in brokering a peace between Ordulf, the archbishop of Salzburg, and Duke Louis VI of Bavaria, indicates that Coloman had subsequently been restored to the good graces of the papacy.

Few details have been preserved of Coloman's career in the decades following his consecration. He maintained a good relationship with the cathedral chapter. For instance, he donated the tithe of Körtvélyes (laid near Kittsee, present-day Austria) to the guardian (custos) of the chapter and his successors. He also restored the formerly confiscated crop tithe of the village Vaszar to the cantor of the chapter, and compensated him with the tithe of Lovászpatona too. Coloman vigorously defended his bishopric's interests; when the residents of Vica (today a borough of Beled) intended to erect a separate chapel, the bishop ruled in favor of his protege, the parish priest of Szentandrás. Sometime around 1343, there was also a conflict of jurisdiction between Coloman and the powerful lord Paul Nagymartoni, when the latter – bypassing the bishop – turned directly to Pope Clement VI to request the assignation of the bishopric tithe of Nagymarton (Mattersburg, Austria) to the local parish church he had just founded. His vicar was Albert, the titular bishop of Nicomedia in 1347, while Guglielmo, a canon at Győr and titular archbishop of Ephesus also served in this capacity from 1359 to 1360.

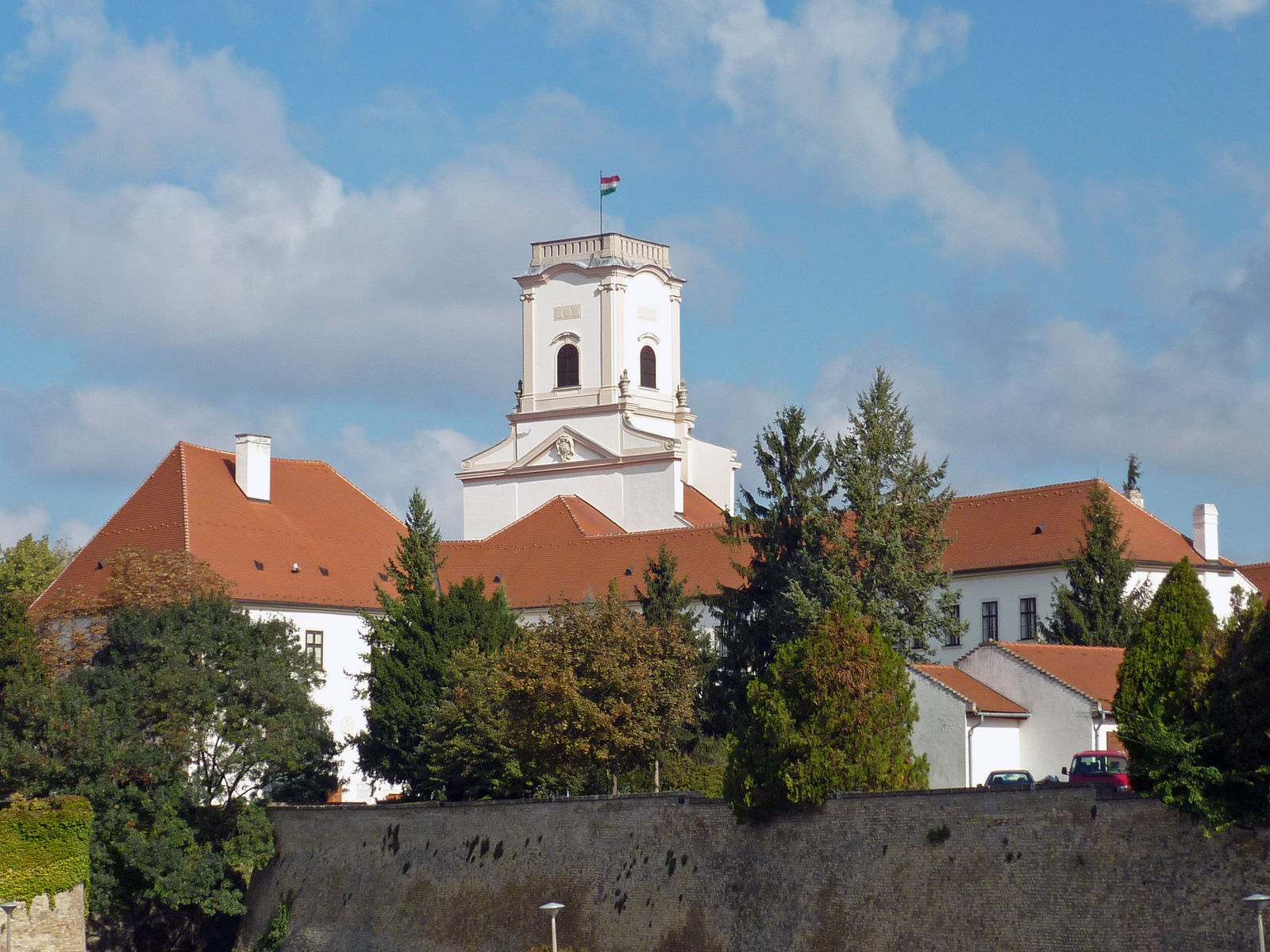
The Bishop's Castle (Püspökvár) in Győr, whose earliest structures were built by Bishop Coloman

Coloman's seals were preserved from the years 1345, 1355 and 1356. The imagery of his seals is considered unusually rich in detail in the period. His first known seal (68x42 mm, 1345) depicts Mary, sitting in a tabernacle-like closed canopy, who holds a scepter in her right hand, with the child Jesus standing on her left knee. A line of blind traceries runs along the front of the throne bench. Attached to the two sides of the structure are appendices of a semicircular cabin of the same size as the height of the bench. There is a standing figure in the booths. The canopy overhanging the throne is crowned by a building pierced with open traceries between its two pinnacles. Below the lower, segmental arch of the building, the left-turning figure of Bishop Coloman kneels, behind which is a blurred coat of arms. The circumscription is "S/IGILLUM/-COLOM/ANI- D/EI-GRAC/IA EPISCOPI/- IAURI- ENSIS...". Coloman's second seal (77x50 mm, 1355, 1356) depicts the Coronation of the Virgin: Mary is crowned by her son Jesus, who holds a book in his left hand. Above the scene, a baldachin overturns, forming a battlemented building with tracery windows and tile covering. The large canopy is held by two rectangular towers set to the edge. The towers are covered with a pointed, tiled helmet, surrounded by a battlement. The mass of their upper level is broken down by tracery windows, the lower ones are transformed into two completely pierced, columnar tabernacles, in which two kneeling angelic figures facing the scene take place. Below the substructure, there is the right-turning, kneeling figure of Bishop Coloman. The base plane of the seal image is decorated with a diamond grid. The circumscription is "S/IGILLUM/-DOMINI-COLOMANI-EPISCOPI-EC/CLESI/E- IAURIENSIS". It is plausible that Coloman's second seal represents a Southern German (Swabian) cultural impact, which affected Central European artistic representations. Besides the cardinals and the archbishops of Esztergom, Coloman is the only known prelate in Medieval Hungary, who used a ring seal (70 mm) with a helmeted coat-of-arms the circumscription "+S-DOMINI COLOMA-------IENSIS". His royal ancestry is reflected by the title "dominus".

Under Coloman's tenure, the Bishop's Castle of Győr (Hungarian: Püspökvár) was built at the point where the Rába flows into a tributary of the Danube (the Moson Danube). The fort became the main residence of the bishops thereafter. The gate tower with bastions and a drawbridge is decorated with Coloman's stone-carved and painted coat-of-arms. According to historian Csaba László, it is possible that he built his new residence, the inner fortified castle, because of his tense relationship with his half-brother, the reigning monarch. During Coloman's episcopate, the Paulines and Franciscans founded their monasteries in Csatka and Szombathely, respectively, both laid in the territory of the diocese of Győr. Coloman consecrated the Franciscan church in Kőszeg. Coloman donated the tithe of Felsőlasztaj (today Oberloisdorf, Austria) to the Cistercian Klostermarienberg Abbey (Borsmonostor) in perpetuity. Coloman permitted the Augustinians to settle down in Pápoc in 1359, where Lady Margaret Gelsei had established their cloister, the Priory of Pápoc. Thereafter, Coloman mediated the conflict between the friars and the local parish priest George. Coloman created the collegiate chapter of Pápoc in 1365, which was confirmed by Louis I three years later. In the following decades, there were various lawsuits over the ownership of landholdings between the collegiate chapter and the Augustinian priory. Coloman died sometime after February 1375. He was succeeded by John de Surdis.

Catholic Church titles
Preceded by Nicholas Kőszegi	Bishop of Győr; 1337–1375	Succeeded by John de Surdis
