= Thomas Vásári =

Thomas (I) Vásári

Ispán of Somogy
- Reign: 1371
- Predecessor: John Paksi
- Successor: Ivan Nelipčić
- Died: after 1381
- Noble family: House of Vásári
- Issue: Stephen Rupolújvári; John Rupolújvári a daughter
- Father: Nicholas I Vásári
- Mother: N Telegdi

Thomas (I) Vásári (also Rupolyi or Rupolújvári; Hungarian: Vásári (I.) Tamás; died after 1381) was a Hungarian nobleman in the 14th century, who served as ispán of Somogy County in 1371.

== Life ==
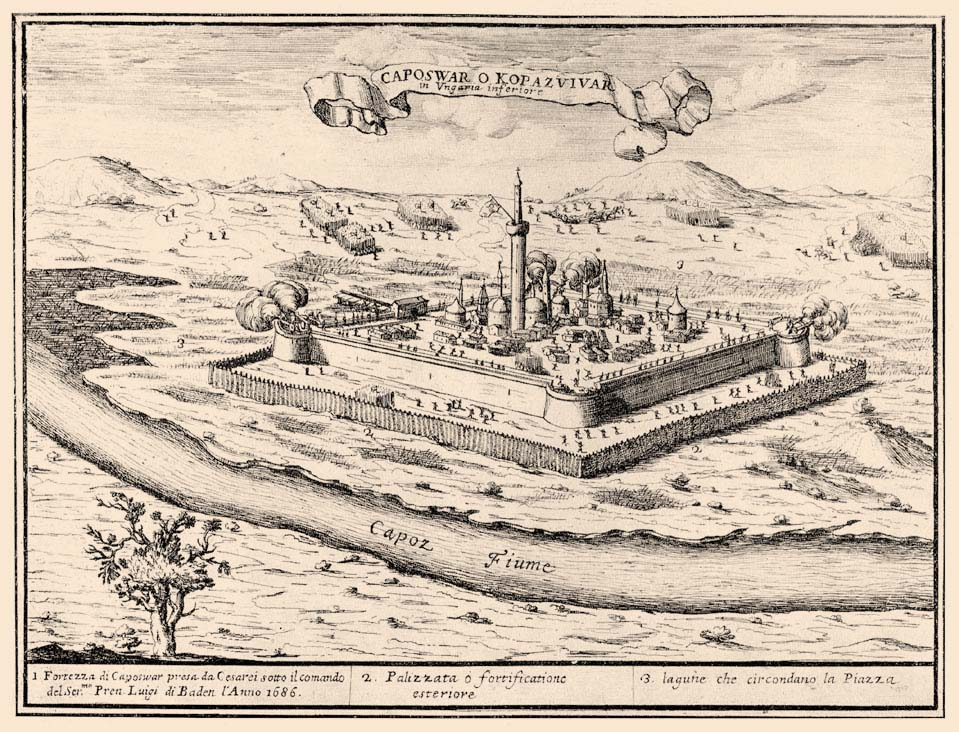
Thomas Vásári was the builder of the castle of Kaposvár (today in negligible ruins)

Thomas Vásári was born into a noble family, which possessed landholdings around their estate centre Vásári in Bihar County. His parents were Nicholas I, the Vice-voivode of Transylvania from 1319 to 1320, and an unidentified sister of Archbishop Csanád Telegdi. One of his brothers was Nicholas II, an influential prelate and diplomat in the Hungarian royal court. Thomas is first mentioned by contemporary records in 1344, when his elder brother Nicholas, who resided in the papal court then, asked Pope Clement VI to permit him and his brothers, John, Thomas and Beke, to pilgrimage to the Holy Land with the accompaniment of each 10 persons. Vásári also requested the pope to grant the right of indulgence to the parish church in their residence Vásári, dedicated to Martin of Tours. Nicholas applied for a similar request five years later, in March 1349, when asked the pope to authorize the confessor of his brothers, John and Thomas, to provide full forgiveness them on their death bed in the future.

Vásári was a courtly knight at least since 1344. He participated in the Hungarian–Venetian Wars. In summer 1356, Louis I of Hungary invaded Venetian territories without a formal declaration of war. He laid siege to Treviso on 27 July. Louis returned to Buda in the autumn, and commissioned Vásári to continue the siege. His troops defeated the Venetian army in the nearby battlefield, but they did not manage to occupy the castle itself. Because of his failure, Thomas Vásári was replaced as leader of the Hungarian army by Benedict Himfi, who also defeated several armies in the region, but the fortified cities, Treviso and Castelfranco remained in the hands of the Venetians. Vásári was able to retake his position by the end of the year. Simultaneously, Louis I won the war in Dalmatia. After the ratification of the Treaty of Zadar in February 1358, Thomas Vásári returned to Hungary.

Following the extinction of the Felsőlendvai family in 1358, he was granted the castle of Rupoly (or Ropoly) and its surrounding lands (today part of Kaposvár) by Louis I. The castle laid in one of the islands of the swampland along the Kapos river. Thereafter Vásári became a prominent landowner in Somogy County. There Thomas Vásári and his sons built a new castle, which was first mentioned by contemporary sources in 1387. Thereafter the family was called with the surname Rupolújvári (lit. "Rupol's New Castle"). His sons, Stephen and John were involved in the 1403 noble uprising against King Sigismund, who confiscated their castle and lands and divided its accessories and handed over to Martin Szerdahelyi and John Tamási. Thomas Vásári also had an unidentified daughter, who married Francis Bebek, Ban of Macsó.

Some documents refer to Thomas Vásári as Ban of Croatia in 1367, but contemporary lists of grand officiers state, Kónya Szécsényi held the dignity during that time. It is presumable, Vásári was a familiaris of Szécsényi and acted as judge and arbitrator on his behalf, who died soon in that year. Vásári served as ispán of Somogy County in 1371.

== Sources ==
- Engel, Pál (1996). Magyarország világi archontológiája, 1301–1457, I. [Secular Archontology of Hungary, 1301–1457, Volume I] (in Hungarian). História, MTA Történettudományi Intézete. ISBN 963-8312-44-0.
- Kristó, Gyula (1988). Az Anjou-kor háborúi [Wars in the Age of the Angevins] (in Hungarian). Zrínyi Kiadó. ISBN 963-326-905-9.
- Hegedűs, András (2003). "Vásári IV. Miklós [Nicholas IV Vásári]". In Beke, Margit (ed.). Esztergomi érsekek 1001–2003 [Archbishops of Esztergom 1001–2003] (in Hungarian). Szent István Társulat. pp. 171–175. ISBN 963-361-472-4.

Thomas I House of Vásári Born: ? Died: after 1381
Political offices
Preceded by John Paksi	Ispán of Somogy; 1371	Succeeded by Ivan Nelipčić
