= Beke Vásári =

Hungarian knight

Ispán of Szilágy
- Reign: 1344
- Died: after 1344
- Noble family: House of Vásári
- Issue: Thomas II
- Father: Nicholas I Vásári
- Mother: N Telegdi

Beke Vásári (Hungarian: Vásári Beke; died after 1344) was a Hungarian courtly knight in the 14th century, who administered the Aranyos Seat and its namesake castle (present-day ruins near Cheud, Romania) with the title ispán of "Szilágy" in 1344. He was the last castellan of Aranyos, who held this title.

Vásári was born into a noble family, which possessed landholdings around their estate centre Vásári in Bihar County. His parents were Nicholas I, the Vice-voivode of Transylvania from 1319 to 1320, and an unidentified sister of Archbishop Csanád Telegdi. His brothers were Nicholas II, an influential prelate and diplomat in the Hungarian royal court, and fello courtly knights John I and Thomas I. Beke is mentioned by a sole contemporary record in 1344, when his elder brother Nicholas, who resided in the papal court then, asked Pope Clement VI to permit him and his brothers, John, Thomas and Beke, to pilgrimage to the Holy Land with the accompaniment of each 10 persons. Vásári also requested the pope to grant the right of indulgence to the parish church in their residence Vásári, dedicated to Martin of Tours. Beke had a son, Thomas II, who was provost of Szenttamás in 1349, under the guidance of his influential uncle Nicholas. As Beke was not mentioned by his brother in 1349, when made similar request to the pope, like five years earlier, it is presumable he was deceased by then.

== Sources ==
- Engel, Pál (1996). Magyarország világi archontológiája, 1301–1457, I. [Secular Archontology of Hungary, 1301–1457, Volume I] (in Hungarian). História, MTA Történettudományi Intézete. ISBN 963-8312-44-0.
- Hegedűs, András (2003). "Vásári IV. Miklós [Nicholas IV Vásári]". In Beke, Margit (ed.). Esztergomi érsekek 1001–2003 [Archbishops of Esztergom 1001–2003] (in Hungarian). Szent István Társulat. pp. 171–175. ISBN 963-361-472-4.
