= Thomas Telegdi =

Hungarian prelate

- Archbishop of Esztergom
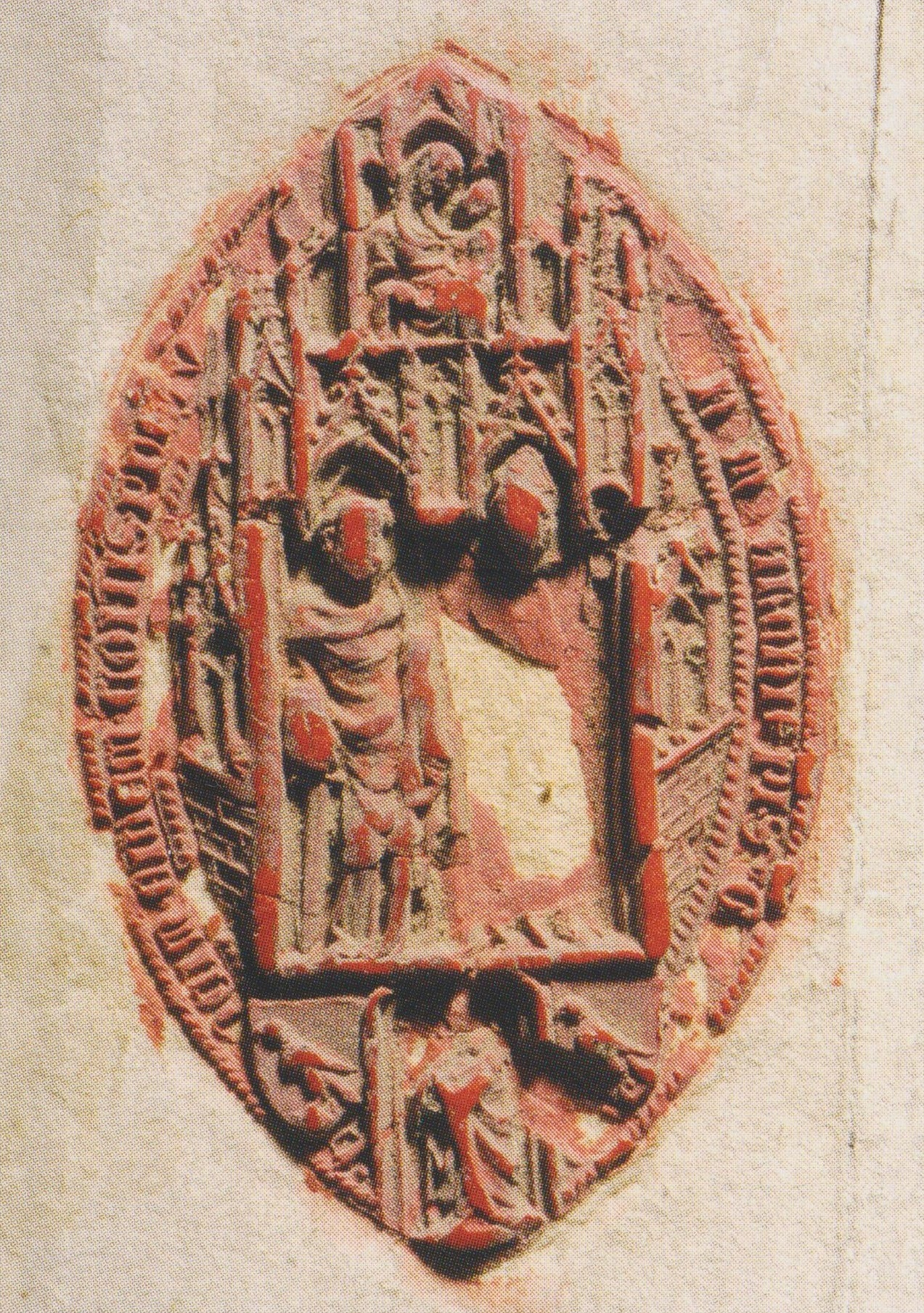
- Seal of Thomas Telegdi, 1367
- Installed: 1367
- Term ended: 1375
- Predecessor: Nicholas Apáti
- Successor: John de Surdis
- Other posts: Bishop of Csanád; Archbishop of Kalocsa

Personal details
- Died: 1375
- Denomination: Roman Catholic
- Parents: Pancras Telegdi
- Coat of arms

Thomas (III) Telegdi (Hungarian: Telegdi (III.) Tamás; died 1375) was a Hungarian prelate in the 14th century. He served as Bishop of Csanád from 1350 to 1358, Archbishop of Kalocsa from 1358 to 1367, then Archbishop of Esztergom from 1367 until his death.

== Early life and career ==
Thomas Telegdi was born into the ancient Hungarian gens (clan) Csanád in the early 14th century, as one of the two sons of Pancras; his only brother was Clement (fl. 1336–1366). Originating from the rich and powerful Telegdi branch, he had several influential relatives, including his uncle Csanád Telegdi, the Archbishop of Esztergom from 1330 to 1349, and cousin Nicholas Vásári, who held the same dignity between 1350 and 1358. The Telegdis rose to prominence during the reign of Charles I of Hungary. Thomas and his brother Clement were first mentioned by contemporary records in 1336 on the occasion of a land exchange contract. Under the patronage of his uncle, Thomas studied in an Italian universitas, obtaining the degree of decretorum doctor, which indicated his competence in science and canon law. Entering ecclesiastical career, Thomas Telegdi was first referred to as archdeacon of Nyitra (Nitra) in 1341. Due to the intervention of his uncle Csanád, he was elected to the collegiate chapter of Esztergom in 1343. With that step, the archbishop caused controversy, because he increased the strictly hierarchical staff (38 members) of the collegiate chapter with one person, for the sake of his nephew. He was made lector of the cathedral chapter still in that year. Simultaneously, he was also a member of the collegiate chapter of Győr in the 1340s.

Pope Clement VI created Telegdi papal chaplain and "Auditor of the Sacred Apostolic Palace" (Latin: auditor sacri palatii). In that capacity, he represented the Apostolic Tribunal of the Roman Rota in legal procedure in the territory of the Kingdom of Hungary, as he never resided in Rome. Upon his request, the pope appointed him grand provost of Esztergom sometimes after 28 January 1350, replacing Nicholas Apáti. He held the office for a brief time, as Pope Clement made him Bishop of Csanád on 31 May 1350. Telegdi sent Conrad Skultéti, the archdeacon of Nyitra to Avignon for his pallium. The bishop paid 20 golds to Skultéti for his service; one-third of his bishopric's annual income. Telegdi appointed his cousin Nicholas as his general and spiritual vicar. Telegdi was a faithful confidant of Louis I of Hungary. His high level qualification made him fit to mediate between the Hungarian royal court and the Holy See. For instance, when Pope Clement handed over the tenth of church income in Hungary to Louis for four years in 1352, Telegdi was entrusted to implement the provision. Telegdi served as representative of Pope Innocent VI in several inaugurations of church benefices at the royal court of Hungary.

== Archbishop of Kalocsa ==
Telegdi's cousin Nicholas Vásári died in mid-1358. Shortly thereafter, Cardinal Guillaume de la Jugié arrived to Hungary with the message of Pope Innocent, who intended to transfer Nicholas Apáti from the Archdiocese of Kalocsa to Esztergom, while wished to appoint Thomas Telegdi as the new Archbishop of Kalocsa, the second most prestigious ecclesiastical dignity in Hungary. However Louis I was reluctant to accept the pope's endeavor, especially with regard to Telegdi, probably not because of his person, but because of the way of his selection, which threatened his right of patronage. Finally, yet, Pope Innocent reached his goal, as he translated Telegdi from the bishopric of Csanád to the see of Kalocsa without any conflict on 25 August 1358. Telegdi again commissioned his confidant Conrad Skultéti to bring his pallium from Avignon to Hungary. Finally, royal envoy Nicholas Zsigrai brought the insignia to the archiepiscopal court of Kalocsa in early 1359.

Pope Innocent VI appointed him patron of the Poor Clares' monastery of Óbuda on 30 July 1360. In the next year, the pope entrusted Telegdi to chair that judicial body, which investigated and ruled the numerous lawsuits relating the estates of the cathedral chapter of Transylvania. When Louis I and Rudolf IV, Duke of Austria prepared a war against Bohemia, Pope Urban V sent a letter to 23 January 1363 to over persuade his monarch to conclude a peace with Charles IV, Holy Roman Emperor. Louis was finally reconciled with Charles IV at their meeting in Uherské Hradiště on 8 May 1363. The pope again wrote a letter to Telegdi to ensure the support of his return to Rome by the Kingdom of Hungary on 18 November 1366. In 1360, the cathedral chapter of Várad divided 53 estates of the Csanád kindred between the family members; the land located in Csanád, Arad and Bihar counties.

== Archbishop of Esztergom ==
At the end of 1366, Nicholas Apáti died after eight-year archiepiscopate. Thomas Telegdi was elected as his successor still in that year. He was first mentioned as archbishop-elect in a donation letter of the Heiligenkreuz Abbey on 2 January 1367. Pope Urban translated him from Kalocsa and confirmed his election on 10 February and sent his pallium on 1 May. As a customary law after election of a new archbishop, Louis I confirmed the landholdings and other income of the Archdiocese of Esztergom in 1369, upon the request of Telegdi. Archbishop Thomas Telegdi was an apolitical and low-profile office-holder, compared with his predecessors, including his uncle Csanád Telegdi. He functioned as an ad litem judge in several lawsuits in the upcoming years; for instance, he acted as an appeal court during a trial between the burghers of Győr and the cathedral chapter of Esztergom. He remained a confidant of Louis I. He supported his military campaigns in Bosnia and Serbia. When Casimir III of Poland died in November 1370, Louis arrived after his uncle's funeral and was crowned king of Poland. in the absence of the monarch, Telegdi acted as royal governor (viceroy) in Hungary. When a war broke out between the Republic of Venice and Francesco I da Carrara, Lord of Padova, who was an ally of Louis, in the summer of 1372, the Hungarian king sent reinforcements to Italy to assist Francesco da Carrara. Telegdi was one of the leaders of the Hungarian auxiliary troops.

Thomas Telegdi was still alive, when Louis I invaded Wallachia in May 1375, because the new prince of Wallachia, Radu I, had formed an alliance with the Bulgarian ruler, Ivan Shishman, and the Ottoman Sultan Murad I. During the summer, Wallachian troops stormed into Transylvania and Ottomans pillaged the Banat, devastating several lands of the Telegdi family. Archbishop Telegdi died sometime in the second half of 1375; his successor John de Surdis was transferred from Győr to Esztergom by Pope Gregory XI on 23 January 1376.

== Sources ==
- Blazovich, László (2003). "Telegdi III. Tamás [Thomas III Telegdi]". In Beke, Margit (ed.). Esztergomi érsekek 1001–2003 [Archbishops of Esztergom 1001–2003] (in Hungarian). Szent István Társulat. pp. 180–185. ISBN 963-361-472-4.
- Engel, Pál (1996). Magyarország világi archontológiája, 1301–1457, I. [Secular Archontology of Hungary, 1301–1457, Volume I] (in Hungarian). História, MTA Történettudományi Intézete. ISBN 963-8312-44-0.
- Markó, László (2006). A magyar állam főméltóságai Szent Istvántól napjainkig: Életrajzi Lexikon [Great Officers of State in Hungary from King Saint Stephen to Our Days: A Biographical Encyclopedia] (in Hungarian). Helikon Kiadó. ISBN 963-208-970-7.
- Udvardy, József (1991). A kalocsai érsekek életrajza (1000–1526) [Biographies of Archbishops of Kalocsa, 1000–1526] (in Hungarian). Görres Gesellschaft.

Thomas III House of Telegdi Born: ? Died: 1375
Catholic Church titles
Preceded by Gregory Kaproncai	Bishop of Csanád; 1350–1358	Succeeded by Gregory Fugyi
Preceded by Nicholas Apáti	Archbishop of Kalocsa; 1358–1367	Succeeded by Stephen Frankói
Preceded by Nicholas Apáti	Archbishop of Esztergom; 1367–1375	Succeeded by John de Surdis
