= Nicholas Kőszegi (bishop) =

Hungarian prelate

- Bishop of Győr
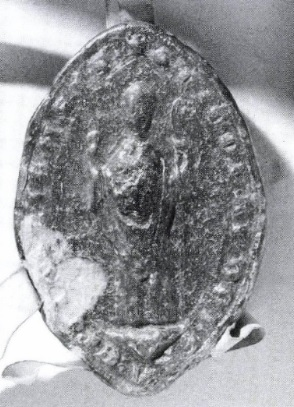
- Seal of Nicholas Kőszegi
- Installed: 1308
- Term ended: 1336
- Predecessor: Theodore Tengerdi
- Successor: Coloman

Personal details
- Born: 1282
- Died: April/July 1336 (aged 53–54)
- Denomination: Roman Catholic
- Parents: Ivan Kőszegi (possibly)

Nicholas Kőszegi (Hungarian: Kőszegi Miklós; 1282 – April/July 1336) was a Hungarian prelate in the 14th century, who served as Bishop of Győr from 1308 until his death. He was an illegitimate son of the powerful lord Ivan Kőszegi. His ambivalent relationship with the rebellious Kőszegi family overshadowed most of his governance as bishop. His ecclesiastical career rose to its peak due to the pressure and influence of his kinship, but later he pledged alliance to Charles I of Hungary, despite the king's distrust.

== Early life ==
Nicholas was an illegitimate descendant of the Kőszegi family, according to a letter of Pope Clement V. His parentage is uncertain; initially, 19th-century historian Antal Pór considered he was the son of Ivan Kőszegi, then modified his standpoint and claimed his father was Gregory, Ivan's son. Genealogist Pál Engel placed his name on the family tree as the son of Ivan's brother, another powerful oligarch Henry Kőszegi, but without explanation and reference. The diocese's almanac claimed Nicholas was the natural son of the eldest brother Nicholas I. Excluding Gregory due to estimate age, Nicholas' biographer Ádám Vajk argued his diocese laid in the territory of Ivan Kőszegi, who ruled Western Transdanubia at the turn of the 13th and 14th centuries. Accordingly, Nicholas was a half-brother of Gregory and John the Wolf, ancestor of the Bernstein family.

Kőszegi was born in 1282. Sometime after 1299, he became provost of the collegiate chapter of St. Adalbert church in Győr. According to Ágnes Maléth, he was canon of the cathedral chapter of Győr at least from 1303 to 1309. He was styled as magister, when held the office of vice-chancellor in 1307 in the court of Otto of Bavaria, one of the pretenders to the Hungarian throne after the extinction of the Árpád dynasty. The career advancement of Kőszegi was due to his family influence and wealth in the region, who de facto ruled their province independently of the royal power by then, and intended to acquire the church lands to extend their dominion in Győr and Sopron counties.

== Bishop of Győr ==
=== In the shadow of his family ===
Kőszegi was unanimously elected Bishop of Győr by the local cathedral chapter between May and October 1308, following the death of his predecessor Theodore Tengerdi. Despite the opinion of some scholars and former almanacs, his election took place without any direct pressure from the Kőszegis. Contemporaries, including papal legate, Gentile Portino da Montefiore did not question the legitimacy of his election in the upcoming years, albeit it could be a sign of political flexibility. Historian György Rácz argued Nicholas' election was "one of the chapters of the power gaming" between Charles and the Kőszegis. Nicholas spent the following months in the escort of the papal legate, who arrived to Buda by 2 November 1308. Kőszegi attended the Diet on 27 November 1308, when Charles was unanimously proclaimed king. He also participated in the second coronation of Charles on 15 June 1309, also representing his family. His papal nomination promoted only after the treaty between Charles I of Hungary and Henry Kőszegi on 4 June 1309 (Ivan Kőszegi died by then), when members of the family, including Bishop Nicholas, took an oath of allegiance to the king. One of Henry's conditions for the king's acceptance was the retention of bishopric of Győr for the family through his natural nephew, Nicholas. As a result, Charles and Gentile sent Nicholas Finta, the chancellor and representative of Nicholas Kőszegi to the papal court in early 1310, in order to request his confirmation. Thereafter, Pope Clement V confirmed his election on 28 July 1310, describing Kőszegi as solutus and soluta, i.e. natural son of free and unmarried men, a 28-year-old clergyman. The pope also determined his servitium commune in 800 golden florins. Sometime between March and July 1311, Kőszegi was consecrated as bishop by Thomas, Archbishop of Esztergom, upon the order of Pope Clement.

In January 1312, Bishop Kőszegi was among those family members, who entered into alliance with the House of Habsburg in Fürstenfeld (Hungarian: Fölöstöm) on 23 January 1312. Nicholas Kőszegi spent much of his time in the Hungarian royal court in the upcoming years. Around October 1313, he was granted the title perpetual count of Győr County by Charles I. He was considered a partisan of the royal power, and his diocese became an important bridgehead against the province of the powerful oligarch Matthew Csák. He was one of the prelates who complained the oligarch's attacks against Church properties to the papal court in November 1313.tel According to historian Ádám Vajk, Bishop Kőszegi functioned as the family's representative and spokesperson in the royal court. However, Charles intended to crush the oligarchic provinces and, among others, launched a campaign against the Kőszegis in Transdanubia and Slavonia in the first half of 1316. Local noblemen joined the royal troops, which contributed to the quick collapse of the Kőszegis' rule in southern parts of their domains. Throughout 1317, Andrew Kőszegi lost Győr, Moson and Sopron counties with their castles. Bishop Nicholas stayed away from the conflict; he was present at the siege of Komárom in November 1317, when Charles I successfully seized the fortress from Matthew Csák. After Charles neglected to reclaim Church property that Matthew Csák had seized by force, the prelates of the realm, including Kőszegi, made an alliance in Kalocsa in March 1318 against all who would jeopardize their interests. Upon their demand, Charles held a Diet in summer, but refused to confirm the Golden Bull of 1222.

Nicholas Kőszegi did not attend the prelates' meeting at Apostag in July 1318, and the subsequent aforementioned diet. He issued his charters in Szombathely from April to July. By that time, Charles confiscated the castle of Győr and its revenues from the diocese and handed over to Paul Nagymartoni, who was appointed ispán of Győr County. It is presumable that Charles took into account the fort's strategic importance against Matthew Csák and its bishop's disloyal and rebellious kinship, when made the decision. György Rácz considered Charles I wanted to discipline the entire episcopal elite because of their "disobedience". Kőszegi protested against the step at the papal court, without success, despite that Pope John XXII even appointed conservators, bishops Lawrence of Vác and Henry of Veszprém, and Matthias, Provost of Győr in order to defend Nicholas' interests in November 1318. When Andrew Kőszegi rebelled against Charles for the second time in the first half of 1319, royal troops seized the Kőszegis' six fortresses within month, effectively destroying their oligarchic dominion. Nicholas Kőszegi did not join his nephew's failed attempt, and remained a partisan of Charles, and interrupted every relationship with his family and their aspirations. He attended the diet at Székesfehérvár in November 1320. He regained the castle of Győr by then. He spent months in the capital Temesvár (present-day Timișoara, Romania) in the following years; for instance, he assisted the consecration of Csanád Telegdi there in January 1323.

Due to intrigues, it was revealed that his father Ivan Kőszegi was married, when he was born. Consequently, Kőszegi requested Pope John XXII to exempt him from this requirement in the first half of 1325. The pope granted this exemption on 30 July. In the next year, there were reports of looting and seizures of his diocese's certain lands and estates, as well as the neighboring Diocese of Passau. The pope appointed Kőszegi as the conservator of the diocese in March 1326, along with Conrad, Bishop of Olomouc and the abbot of Sedlec. Upon Kőszegi's request, Pope John placed the Diocese of Győr under the protection of the Holy See in January 1327. The pope also appointed Henry, Bishop of Veszprém as Kőszegi's defender ("conservator") in June in order to restore benefice of the diocese. According to Ádám Vajk, Nicholas' stepbrother John the Wolf was behind the attacks against the Diocese of Győr. Accordingly, he transuded private information to the Holy See about the bishop's parentage, in order to turn him out of office, and occupied Szombathely and other bishopric estates in Vas County. Plausibly, he turned against Nicholas in connection with another open rebellion of the Kőszegis in 1327, to which the bishop refused to join.

=== Ecclesiastical affairs ===
Following the decline of the Kőszegis' power, his relationship with Charles I had normalized. He spent much of his time in the royal court at Visegrád. He was a founding member of the Order of Saint George on 24 April 1326, the first secular chivalric order in the world. He attended a provincial synod in Esztergom on 8 November 1326, where he acted as an arbiter in the lawsuit between Boleslaus of Esztergom and Henry of Veszprém. Kőszegi and Nicholas Dörögdi represented the interests of the archbishop, while Csanád Telegdi and John, archdeacon of Hont were appointed as trustees of Henry. From 1326 to 1331, Kőszegi acted as co-judge alongside Judge royals Alexander Köcski, then Paul Nagymartoni several times. Kőszegi countersigned the peace treaty between Charles and the three dukes of Austria in Bruck an der Leitha on 21 September 1328. He summoned a general assembly in Vas County in July 1330, upon the request of the king. Kőszegi was appointed conservator (defender) to the Archdiocese of Salzburg along with Pagano della Torre, Patriarch of Aquileia and Rudolf von Montfort, Bishop of Constance in April 1331. Upon the instruction of Pope John XXII, Nicholas Kőszegi investigated the circumstances of the election of Thatamerius, the provost of Székesfehérvár in June 1331, along with the papal tax collectors present in Hungary. Under his episcopate, the churches of Köveskút and Szeleste were built. The papal court ordered Kőszegi to recover the confiscated possessions and revenues of the Cistercian Klostermarienberg Abbey (Borsmonostor, today part of Mannersdorf an der Rabnitz, Austria) and to settle and mediate the dispute between the parish of Debrecen and the local Dominican friars. With his financial support in 1321, the Paulines built a monastery in Tüskevár in the territory of the Diocese of Győr.

Because of the staple right of Vienna, which was granted this privilege after 1312, and its domestic reaction, when a new commercial route from Buda to Prague via Pressburg and Brno was set up to enable merchants travelling between Hungary and the Holy Roman Empire to bypass Vienna, the town of Győr was separated from distance trade routes, while Pressburg and Sopron were granted staple right. It had a negative impact on the bishopric's income too. In addition to his servitium commune, the sustenance of papal legate Gentile's court in the first years also increased Kőszegi's expenditures, who, compared to other bishops, contributed significantly to this because of his temporary, unstable political status. Sometime before 1326, most probably between 1311 and 1314, Kőszegi built the castle of Fertőrákos (the former episcopal mansion in its place was destroyed by local burghers of Sopron in 1311). Kőszegi had several conflicts and lawsuits with the town of Sopron in the upcoming years; he contested the determined borders between Págya and Fertőrákos, while he was also charged that unlawfully occupied Meggyes (present-day Mörbisch am See in Austria) from the burghers. Sometime before 1321, he seized the wine tithe of Nyúl, which belonged to the property of the Bakonybél Abbey. However he returned it upon the request of Archbishop Thomas of Esztergom. In order to concentrate the bishopric's lands in Győr and Sopron counties, he exchanged several lands with the Apponyi branch of the gens (clan) Péc. He also bought fishponds and lands in Gyirmót (today a borough in Győr).

After 1331, Kőszegi retired to his diocese and gradually lost influence in the royal court. In the spring of 1335, he suffered the occupation of his residence by Charles, who confiscated Győr Castle and its accessories to put pressure on the elderly bishop and his cathedral chapter in order to ensure the succession of his illegitimate son Coloman as Bishop of Győr. In response, Pope Benedict XII instructed Archbishop Csanád Telegdi to persuade the king to compensate Nicholas and his diocese for the damage he has suffered and to refrain from acts that damage the church in the future. In January 1336, the Babonići and the Kőszegis made an alliance with the Dukes of Austria against Charles, but Nicholas Kőszegi did not participate in the conspiracy. As a result of an agreement, Kőszegi regained his estates a couple of months before his death, in the late spring-early summer of 1336. At the end of his life, Nicholas Kőszegi celebrated the funeral of Blessed Maurice Csák.

== Sources ==
- Bánk, József, ed. (1968). Győregyházmegyei almanach. Schematizmus Dioecesis Jaurinensis [Almanac of the Diocese of Győr] (in Hungarian). Authority of the Diocese of Győr.
- Engel, Pál (1996). Magyarország világi archontológiája, 1301–1457, I. [Secular Archontology of Hungary, 1301–1457, Volume I] (in Hungarian). História, MTA Történettudományi Intézete. ISBN 963-8312-44-0.
- Maléth, Ágnes (2020). A Magyar Királyság és a Szentszék kapcsolata I. Károly korában (1301–1342) [The Relationship of the Hungarian Kingdom and the Holy See in the time of Charles I (1301–1342)] (in Hungarian). Pécsi Tudományegyetem BTK TTI Középkori és Koraújkori Történeti Tanszék. ISBN 978-963-429-500-6.
- Rácz, György (2020). "Az egyházi elit változásai [Changes in the Church Elite]". In Csukovits, Enikő (ed.). Az Anjou-kor hatalmi elitje (in Hungarian). MTA Bölcsészettudományi Kutatóközpont. pp. 133–162. ISBN 978-963-416-212-4.
- Vajk, Ádám (2011). ""Mibe került ezen hűségi levél?" Kőszegi Miklós győri püspöksége és az országos politika ["What did this charter of loyalty cost?" The bishopric of Miklós of Kőszeg and the countrywide politics]". In Nemes, Gábor; Vajk, Ádám (eds.). In labore fructus. Jubileumi tanulmányok Győregyházmegye történetéből (in Hungarian). Győri Egyházmegyei Levéltár. pp. 411–440. ISBN 978-615-5035-01-2.

Nicholas House of Kőszegi Born: 1282 Died: April/July 1336
Catholic Church titles
Preceded by Theodore Tengerdi	Bishop of Győr; 1308–1336	Succeeded by Coloman
