= Vásári family =

House of Vásári
- Parent house: House of Szügyi
- Country: Kingdom of Hungary
- Founded: c. 1255
- Founder: Roland Szügyi
- Final ruler: Thomas Alberti
- Dissolution: c. 1437
- Cadet branches: Rupolújvári, then Alberti

Vásári (also Szügyi, Rupolújvári then Alberti) was a noble family in the Kingdom of Hungary, which first appeared in the late 13th century and had estates and villages mostly in Bihar County.

== History ==
The first known member of the family was Roland Szügyi, a landowner of Szügy in Nógrád County, who is mentioned by a single source in 1255. He later moved to Vásári in Bihar County (today an uninhabited place near Salonta). He had three sons: Gregory, Lawrence and Nicholas I. They involved in a lawsuit over the determination of boundaries of their inherited land Vásári, and reached an agreement with their neighbor comes Peter Ajkai in 1295. Both Gregory and Nicholas were familiaris of the powerful military leader Dózsa Debreceni, an important and loyal soldier of Charles I of Hungary. Nicholas I, also served as vice-voivode for a time, married a sister of Archbishop Csanád Telegdi, which made his family to rose to prominence.

Nicholas' eldest son Nicholas II was a prominent prelate and diplomat during the reign of Ladislaus I of Hungary. Due to the influence of his maternal uncle, he attended a foreign (presumably Italian) universitas thereafter, as Pope Clement VI referred to him as iuris peritus ("learned in the law"). He visited the papal court of Avignon as a skilled diplomat since the 1340s. Beside his official diplomatic issues, he also asked the contribution of the pope in personal affairs: he requested the forgiveness of sins for himself and his living relatives, including his mother, for the time of their death; in February 1344, he asked Clement to permit him and his brothers, John, Thomas and Beke, to pilgrimage to the Holy Land with the accompaniment of each 10 persons. Vásári also requested the pope to grant the right of indulgence to the parish church in their residence Vásári, dedicated to Martin of Tours. He died as Archbishop of Esztergom in 1358.

In the same time, Nicholas II's younger brothers, John, Thomas and Beke were courtly knights in the royal court of Louis I. Beke was ispán of Aranyos Seat in 1344. He died during his young age, his son was Thomas II, a provost of Szenttamás. Thomas I was granted the castle of Rupoly (or Ropoly) and its surrounding lands (today part of Kaposvár) in 1358; The castle laid in one of the islands of the swampland along the Kapos river. Thereafter Vásári became a prominent landowner in Somogy County. There Thomas Vásári and his sons built a new castle, which was first mentioned by contemporary sources in 1387. Thereafter the family was called with the surname Rupolújvári (lit. "Rupol's New Castle"). His sons, Stephen and John were involved in the 1403 noble uprising against King Sigismund, who confiscated their castle and lands and divided its accessories and handed over to Martin Szerdahelyi and John Tamási. Stephen's only son Thomas (III) bore the surname Alberti in the 1430s (last mentioned in 1437), who owned Brezovica (Berzőce) for a time.

== Family tree ==
- Roland Szügyi (fl. 1255) → Vásári
  - Gregory (fl. 1295–1327)
    - John II (fl. 1359)
      - Ladislaus (fl. 1361)
        - Demetrius ("Zerus"; fl. 1386–93)
        - John III
          - Anne (fl. 1409–14) ∞ Emeric Szepesi
        - Anne ∞ Martin Csomaközi
        - Apolina ∞ Stephen Henchidai
    - a daughter ∞ James Tomaj
  - Lawrence (fl. 1295)
  - Nicholas I (fl. 1295–1320; d. before 1333) ∞ N Telegdi
    - Nicholas II (fl. 1320–58)
    - John I (fl. 1333–59) ∞ N Nyéstai
    - Thomas I (fl. 1344–81) --> Rupolújvári
      - Stephen (fl. 1386–1403; d. before 1411) ∞ Anne N (fl. 1422–30)
        - Thomas Alberti (fl. 1430–37)
      - John (fl. 1386–1407)
      - a daughter ∞ Francis Bebek
    - Beke (fl. 1344)
      - Thomas II (fl. 1349)
    - a daughter ∞ Stephen Vajdai
    - a daughter ∞ Ladislaus N

== Sources ==
- Engel, Pál (1996). Magyarország világi archontológiája, 1301–1457, I. [Secular Archontology of Hungary, 1301–1457, Volume I] (in Hungarian). História, MTA Történettudományi Intézete. ISBN 963-8312-44-0.
- Hegedűs, András (2003). "Vásári IV. Miklós [Nicholas IV Vásári]". In Beke, Margit (ed.). Esztergomi érsekek 1001–2003 [Archbishops of Esztergom 1001–2003] (in Hungarian). Szent István Társulat. pp. 171–175. ISBN 963-361-472-4.
