= Nicholas II Vásári =

Hungarian archbishop (died 1358)

Nicholas Vásári
- Archbishop of Esztergom
- Installed: 1350
- Term ended: 1358
- Predecessor: Csanád Telegdi
- Successor: Nicholas Apáti
- Other posts: Grand Provost of Esztergom; Bishop of Nyitra; Bishop of Zagreb; Archbishop-elect of Kalocsa

Orders
- Consecration: 23 May 1347 by Pope Clement VI

Personal details
- Born: c. 1300
- Died: May/August 1358
- Denomination: Roman Catholic
- Parents: Nicholas I Vásári; N Telegdi

Nicholas (II) Vásári (also Szügyi; Hungarian: Vásári (II.) Miklós, Latin: Nicolaus de Viasaria; died 1358) was a Hungarian prelate in the 14th century, who served as Archbishop of Esztergom from 1350 until his death.

== Early life ==
Nicholas was born in the 1300s as the son of Nicholas I Vásári, the Vice-voivode of Transylvania from 1319 to 1320, and an unidentified lady from the Telegdi family, which originated from the gens (clan) Csanád. Nicholas had three brothers and two sisters. Vásári's origin is confirmed by a letter of Pope John XXII on 2 July 1320, when called him "Nicolao nato dilecti filii nobilis viri Nicolai Comitis Viceducis Transsilvani". Former historiographical works incorrectly referred him Monoszlói or Frankói. Nicholas' grandfather was Roland Szügyi, who possessed Szügy, Nógrád County in 1255, but sometimes later moved to Bihar County, where became the owner of Vásári (present-day a depopulated area). His sons took their surname after the village. Nicholas' maternal uncle was Csanád Telegdi, the Archbishop of Esztergom from 1330 to 1349. The influential prelate became Nicholas's mentor and supporter in his ecclesiastical career.

When his uncle functioned as provost of Várad (present-day Oradea Mare, Romania), Vásári had an opportunity to study in the local collegiate school. Upon Telegdi's request, Vásári was appointed a canon of the cathedral chapter of Várad by Pope John XXII, issuing the aforementioned papal document on 2 July 1320. When Csanád Telegdi was consecrated as Bishop of Eger in January 1323, Vásári followed his uncle to the diocese. He was made a canon, then archdeacon of Borsova (still referred with this title in 1332). It is possible that Vásári attended a foreign (presumably Italian) universitas thereafter, as Pope Clement VI referred to him as iuris peritus ("learned in the law"). His uncle Csanád Telegdi became Archbishop of Esztergom in September 1330. He sent his nephew and Benedictine friar Anselm to the papal court of Avignon for his pallium, receiving it on 5 January 1331. When Charles I of Hungary visited his uncle, Robert, in Naples in July 1333, Telegdi and Vásári were among the dignitaries, who escorted the king. There Charles' second son, Andrew, was betrothed to Robert's granddaughter and eventual successor, Joanna I. Vásári was made canon of Várad again on 2 October 1333. He was styled as archdeacon of Bars on 15 April 1337. Pope Benedict XII appointed him grand provost of Esztergom on 18 January 1339, becoming effectively his uncle's deputy in the archdiocese, despite his order of subdeacon. He replaced Charles' illegitimate son, Coloman in that position. Vásári served in this capacity until 23 May 1347.

Since the late 1330s, Vásári resided in the royal court and became a faithful confidant of the royal family, even after Louis I of Hungary ascended the Hungarian throne in July 1342. The queen mother, Elizabeth, visited Naples in the summer of 1343 to promote the interests of her son Andrew. Subsequently, he traveled further to Avignon as a member of the Hungarian delegation, led by Vid Vasvári, the Bishop of Nyitra. Pope Clement was the overlord of the Kingdom of Naples; they were only able to persuade him to promise that Andrew would be crowned as Joanna's husband. There, Vásári also requested the contribution of the pope in personal affairs: he requested the forgiveness of sins for himself and his living relatives, including his mother, for the time of their death; in February 1344, he asked Clement to permit him and his brothers, John, Thomas and Beke, to pilgrimage to the Holy Land with the accompaniment of each 10 persons. Vásári also requested the pope to grant the right of indulgence to the parish church in their residence Vásári, dedicated to Martin of Tours. According to the charges, the Hungarian delegation tried to bribe the officers of the papal court in order to a favorable decision, but without the permission of the royal family. This led to the discretization of Vid Vasvári, but it did not affect Vásári's career, who was described as "useful workforce" by Louis I in the same time.

== Prelate ==
Vid Vasvári, the Bishop of Nyitra died in February 1347. Upon Louis' request, Vásári, who still resided in the papal court, was consecrated as his successor by Pope Clement on 23 May 1347. Louis I launched his first Neapolitan campaign in the same year. The king sent small expeditions one after one to Italy at the beginning of his war against Joanna; his first troops departed under the command of Nicholas Vásári, who went ahead to L'Aquila. Vásári cooperated with Hungarian lord Nicholas Kont in the upcoming months, they successfully persuaded several nobles in the countryside around L'Aquila to support Louis' efforts against his sister-in-law. Returning home for a brief time, Vásári reported on the new allies and joined the Hungarian royal army, which entered the Kingdom of Naples on 24 December at the city, which had yielded to Louis. After Louis adopted the traditional titles of the kings of Naples, Vásári again traveled to the papal court in February 1349, alongside George Bebek, to gain the support and confirmation of Pope Clement. There Vásári expressed his intention to visit the Holy Sepulchre with twelve persons.

Meanwhile, Nicholas Vásári was nominated to the position of Bishop of Zagreb on 26 March 1349. A single charter issued on 2 September mentioned him in this capacity, but the episcopal see became vacant again by December, because Vásári was elected Archbishop of Kalocsa during that time. He was still styled as archbishop-elect on 11 January 1350, when he was transferred to the archiepiscopal see of Esztergom, succeeding his uncle, Csanád Telegdi, who died in the second half of the previous year. 19th-century historiographical works, including Antal Pór's studies, claimed that Vásári simultaneously held the office of chancellor in the royal court during his archiepiscopate. Thus Pór connected that unnamed Hungarian chancellor to the person of Várási, who led diplomatic missions to the Italian peninsula, including Padua in 1356, according to Italian chronicles. Later historians, for instance Imre Szentpétery and Bernát L. Kumorovitz refused Pór's allegation.

Vásári held an ecclesiastical synod in Esztergom in 1353. He participated in Louis' military campaign against Serbia in the next year, when Hungarian troops invaded the empire, forcing Stefan Dušan to withdraw from the region along the river Sava. He was one of the key draftsmen of the Treaty of Zadar, which was signed on 18 February 1358, in which the Republic of Venice renounced all Dalmatian towns and islands between the Gulf of Kvarner and Durazzo in favor of Louis. Vásári was last referred as a living person on 26 May. He died by 23 August.

== Codices ==
His two legal codices (Bonifacius papa VIII. Liber sextus Decretalium and Clemens papa V. Constitutiones), which represent the same art style of Bolognese trecento as the Anjou Legendarium, were preserved in the Capitulary Library of the Padua Cathedral. While the completion of the first codex is uncertain, the second one was finished in 1343. Both of them were dedicated to Nicholas, who was still grand provost of Esztergom during that time. He presumably ordered the preparation of two works, when resided on the Italian Peninsula as a member of the Hungarian diplomatic mission. Fellow Hungarian John Uzsai served as rector of the ultramontanes (i.e. foreign students) at the University of Bologna in that year, who maintained liaison with the Hungarian prelate and the local painters. The codices were later owned by Jacopo Zeno, the Bishop of Padua in the second half of the 15th century. The coats-of-arms of Pietro Ruiz de Coreglia, protonotary apostolic of Valence also appear in both codices.

The Bonifacius papa VIII. Liber sextus Decretalium contains the hagiography Life of Saint Stephen, King of Hungary (this part is missing from the Anjou Legendarium). Its miniatures, which are the earliest chronicle representations of the king, depicts St. Stephen as a saintly and converter monarch (with the insignia of church model), while the later chronicles, for instance, the Illuminated Chronicle, exclusively portray him as founder of the state and warlord. This is also the only known depiction, where Stephen's parents Géza and Sarolt are shown together. Ornament line between pictures also portrays individually St. Stephen, St. Emeric, St. Ladislaus and possibly St. Gerard or St. Nicholas, in addition to the customer Nicholas Vásári himself. The second codex, Clemens papa V. Constitutiones is less remarkable from the point of view of art history, it depicts the legend of Catherine of Alexandria in the usual contemporary way.

== Sources ==
- Engel, Pál (1996). Magyarország világi archontológiája, 1301–1457, I. [Secular Archontology of Hungary, 1301–1457, Volume I] (in Hungarian). História, MTA Történettudományi Intézete. ISBN 963-8312-44-0.
- Gerevich, Lászlóné (1957). "Vásári Miklós két kódexe [The Two Codices of Nicholas Vásári]". Művészettörténeti Értesítő. 6 (2–3): 133–137. ISSN 0027-5247.
- Hegedűs, András (2003). "Vásári IV. Miklós [Nicholas IV Vásári]". In Beke, Margit (ed.). Esztergomi érsekek 1001–2003 [Archbishops of Esztergom 1001–2003] (in Hungarian). Szent István Társulat. pp. 171–175. ISBN 963-361-472-4.
- Udvardy, József (1991). A kalocsai érsekek életrajza (1000–1526) [Biographies of Archbishops of Kalocsa, 1000–1526] (in Hungarian). Görres Gesellschaft.

Nicholas II House of Vásári Born: 1300s Died: May/August 1358
Catholic Church titles
Preceded by Vid Vasvári	Bishop of Nyitra; 1347–1348	Succeeded by Nicholas Apáti
Preceded by James of Piacenza	Bishop of Zagreb; 1349	Succeeded by Denis Lackfi elected
Preceded by Stephen Harkácsi	Archbishop of Kalocsa elected 1349–1350	Succeeded by Denis Lackfi
Preceded by Csanád Telegdi	Archbishop of Esztergom; 1350–1358	Succeeded by Nicholas Apáti
