= Nicholas Dörögdi =

Hungarian prelate

- Bishop of Eger
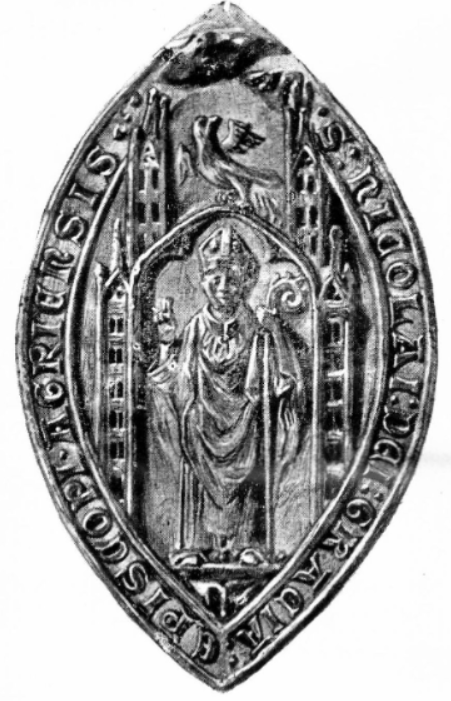
- Seal of Nicholas Dörögdi, 1358
- Installed: 1 October 1330
- Term ended: 1361
- Predecessor: Csanád Telegdi
- Successor: Michael Szécsényi
- Other posts: Archdeacon of Nyitra; Provost of Pressburg; Archbishop-elect of Esztergom

Personal details
- Born: c. 1290 Felsődörögd
- Died: 1361 Eger (?)
- Buried: Eger Cathedral
- Denomination: Roman Catholic
- Parents: Paul Dörögdi
- Education: University of Bologna

Nicholas Dörögdi (Hungarian: Dörögdi Miklós; died 1361) was a Hungarian prelate in the first half of the 14th century. He was elected Archbishop of Esztergom between 1329 and 1330, then Bishop of Eger from 1330 until his death.

== Ancestry and early life ==
Nicholas was born in Felsődörögd, Zala County (today a borough of Taliándörögd, which lays in Veszprém County) around 1290 or before. The Dörögdi family descended from the Zala branch of the gens Péc. His father was Paul, and he had at least two brothers, Oncs and Stephen, whose grave was excavated by archaeologist Alán Kralovánszky in 1976. Both of them were patrons of the local St. Andrew parish church. His uncles were Demetrius, Nicholas and Thomas, who was castellan of Újvár (today Holíč, Slovakia) in the 1340s. His cousins were canons John (son of Demetrius) and Nicholas (son of Nicholas). Possibly he was also related to the nobles in Alsódörögd (present-day also an uninhabited land in Taliándörögd).

Dörögdi started his career as a canon of the Diocese of Veszprém, according to historian Antal Poór. In contrast, theologian Lajos Dedek Crescens claimed that he belonged to the archiepiscopal court of Thomas, becoming a cleric in Esztergom, but there is no record of it. Dörögdi studied in the University of Bologna, obtaining a degree of canon law and the title of magister. His study costs were covered by the Hungarian fund Collegium Christi, which was established by John Budai, archdeacon of Bars in 1309. According to historian Endre Veress, Dörögdi is identical with that Nicholas, who served as archdeacon of Bars sometime between 1309 and 1316. He was elected rector of the ultramontanes (i.e. foreign students) at the University of Bologna on 1 May 1316, simultaneously he was already styled as archdeacon of Nyitra (Nitra). During his one-year tenure, the new regulations of the university were adopted. Returning home sometime after 1 May 1317, he actually occupied the dignity of archdeacon of Nyitra and became chancellor in the court of Archbishop Thomas of Esztergom. In this capacity, he acted as a judge and representative of the archdiocese over a lawsuit in Kemence, Hont County in early 1319. He permanently resided in Esztergom since that year, becoming the chancellor of Archbishop Thomas.

Dörögdi was elected provost of Pressburg (present-day Bratislava in Slovakia) by 1320, maintaining the office of archdeacon of Nyitra. He was also a confidant of Boleslaus, the new Archbishop of Esztergom. He functioned as vicar general of the prelate during a lawsuit in February 1323. When the Polish-born Boleslaus was involved in a conflict of jurisdiction with the Diocese of Kraków, Dörögdi acted as one of the witnesses in the trial, which took place in the second half of the 1320s. He also represented the interests of the archbishop against other bishops in the provincial synod in Esztergom in November 1326, when they accused Boleslaus that he possessed some churches and their benefices illegally in their dioceses. He was styled as royal chaplain by two documents in June 1325 and March 1326. Becoming the counsellor of Charles I of Hungary, he served as head (count) of the royal chapel (Latin: comes capellae regiae) in November 1327, and possibly held the dignity until his election as archbishop. In this capacity, he supervised the convent of the royal chaplains, guarded the royal relic treasures and exercised jurisdiction over those servant laymen, who secured the liturgical activity of the court clergy. Nicholas Dörögdi also served as keeper of the royal seal and director of the place of authentication in the royal court beside that. During his tenure as head of the royal chapter, he successfully recovered some estates and landholdings for the cathedral chapter of Pressburg, using his political influence in the royal court of Charles.

== Prelate ==
=== Archbishop-elect ===
Boleslaus of Esztergom died in December 1328. Dörögdi was elected as his successor by the cathedral chapter early the next year, despite the fact that Charles I did not support his election and nominated his another protege Csanád Telegdi to the position. Retaining his provostry of Pressburg, Dörögdi intended to travel to Avignon in order to reach the papal confirmation of his election by Pope John XXII. In his absence, his vicars, provost Lodomer and lector Ladislaus governed the archiepiscopal province throughout the year. However Dörögdi and his escort did not reach Avignon, because they were robbed and imprisoned by local robber knights, counts Hugo and Randolph von Montfort near Konstanz, in the territory of the Diocese of Chur. Therefore, Pope John ordered Rudolph, the Bishop of Constance on 1 April 1329 to excommunicate the counts, otherwise his relatives. Following that Dörögdi and his escort were freed from captivity.

Dörögi arrived to the papal court at Avignon in the summer of 1329. However, referring to the controversial reports from the cathedral chapter of Esztergom, Pope John refused to confirm his election until further thorough investigation. On 8 February 1330, the pope appointed bishops Ladislaus Kórógyi of Pécs and Henry of Veszprém to administer the archiepiscopal province and considered it necessary to hold a new election. As Dörögdi had a good relationship with Charles, Lajos Dedek Crescens considered his election was opposed by the king's spouse Queen Elizabeth, who supported the burghers of Esztergom in their verdict against the provostry of Pressburg. A royal charter issued in January 1330 declared the episcopal see as vacant. Dörögdi felt the pressure and burden him that his case was deadlocked. Sometimes before 1 September 1330, Dörögdi resigned as archbishop-elect "for some reasons" before Raymond de Mostuéjouls and Imbert du Puy, two members of the College of Cardinals. Shortly thereafter Csanád Telegdi, the incumbent Bishop of Eger was translated to the archdiocese by Charles I and this act was confirmed by the pope on 17 September. Pope John compensated Dörögdi with the bishopric of Eger, when appointed him to the dignity on 1 October 1330. It is plausible that Dörögdi and his escort stayed in the papal court until May 1331. He paid 400 golden florins as servitium commune in 1332.

=== Bishop ===
Despite the opposition of his election as Archbishop of Esztergom by the royal couple, Dörögdi did not become disgraced at the royal court. For instance, when Charles I held an international summit in 1335 at Visegrád, he commissioned the prelate to travel to Prague and accompany John of Bohemia to Hungary. He was also present at the coronation of Louis I of Hungary in Székesfehérvár on 21 July 1342.

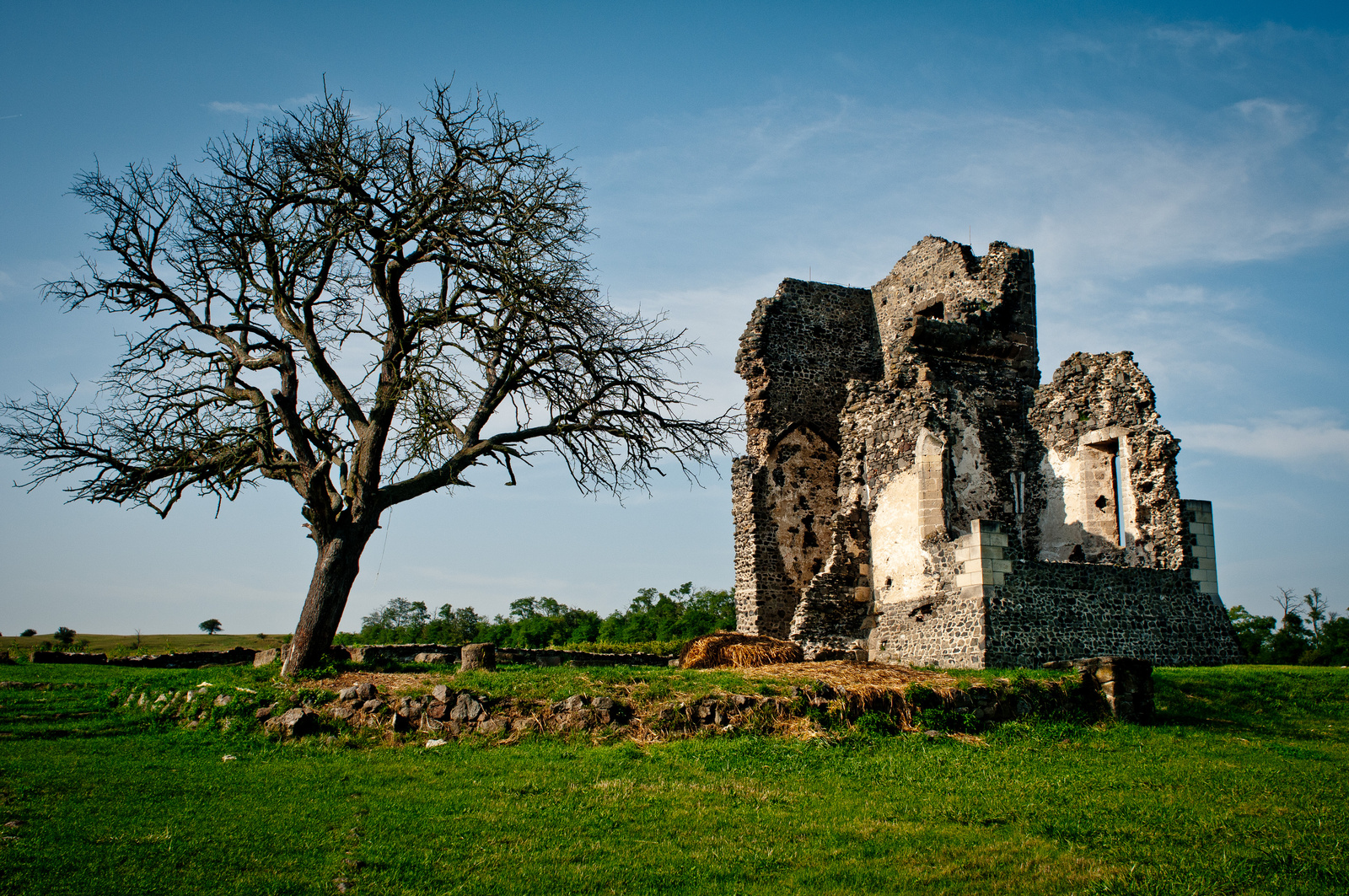
Ruins of the St. Andrew parish church in Taliándörögd

After becoming the Bishop of Eger, Dörögdi inherited the conflict with the Provostship of Szepes (Spiš) regarding the suzerainty over the Archdeaconry of Tárca, which laid in Sáros County. A papal court ruled in favour of Precław, the provost of Szepes. Despite that Dörögdi did not agree with the decision and seems to have finally reached a compromise: according to a charter issued in 1336, with the approval of Csanád Telegdi, the Archbishop of Esztergom – otherwise, who established the archdeaconry prior to that, still as Bishop of Eger –, he handed over only half of the tithes from the archdeaconry to the local church, while reserved the other half for himself. When papal tax collectors visited the dioceses of Hungary between 1332 and 1337, they listed 821 parishes, 12 provostships and abbeys which belonged to the Bishopric of Eger. The number of parishes (alongside their revenues and tithe) exceeded the all dioceses, every fourth parish in the kingdom laid in the territory of the Diocese of Eger. There was a dispute in connection with the right of sovereignty over the archdeanery of Sáros between Dörögdi and Telegdi, the Archbishop of Esztergom. Charles I ruled in favor of Dörögdi but assigned half of the collected tithe to the local rectors.

During his episcopate, the Romanesque cathedral of Eger has been enlarged with Gothic elements, continuing Telegdi's efforts. Dörögdi consecrated its St. Mary Magdalene altar and provided benefice in 1347. He also established a Pauline monastery at Felnémet (today a borough of Eger) in the same year. When the Carthusians settled down in Felsőtárkány in the 1330s, Dörögdi donated the incomes of the settlement to them. Dörögdi held a provincial synod in 1348. Inheriting the decade-long conflict, Dörögdi had various disputes with Andrew Szécsi, Bishop of Transylvania regarding the issue of jurisdiction over the sparsely populated Máramaros region (today Maramureș in Romania). In 1337, Pope Benedict XII instructed Dörögdi investigate the alleged violations committed to the detriment of the Benedictines in Hungary, such as the occupation of the abbeys of Bulcs (Bulci), Bizere, Garáb and Mogyoród, by a secular person named Stephen – who arbitrarily poses as a Benedictine monk but is not ordained a priest –, in addition to the abuses committed by Paul, the Bishop of Belgrade against the Kolozsmonostor Abbey and the Priory of Béla (Bijela) in the Diocese of Zagreb.

Mieszko of Veszprém removed the St. Andrew parish church of Felsődörögd from the jurisdiction of the archdeanery of Zala and placed it directly under the supervision of the bishopric upon the request of Dörögdi on 29 April 1339. Dörögdi asked Pope Clement VI to contribute to the decision. The nobles of Alsódörögd protested against the decision and filed a lawsuit against Mieszko. Agreement was reached in 1347, when they waived the right of parish law of their Virgin Mary stone chapel at Alsódörögd and shared the right of patronage over the St. Andrew parish church with the diocese. During his episcopate, his two nephews John and Nicholas were elected to the cathedral chapter. Dörögdi requested benefice from the pope for John in 1344 and the then 19-year-old Nicholas in 1347.

Dörögdi was last mentioned as a living person by contemporary records on 28 August 1361. He was buried in the middle of the gateway of the Eger Cathedral. After the building was burnt down in 1506, his corpse was relocated in front of the Virgin Mary altar and a red marble tomb was erected. His grave was excavated by archaeologist Károly Kozák in the 1970s.

== Sources ==
- Engel, Pál (1996). Magyarország világi archontológiája, 1301–1457, I. [Secular Archontology of Hungary, 1301–1457, Volume I] (in Hungarian). História, MTA Történettudományi Intézete. ISBN 963-8312-44-0.
- Maléth, Ágnes (2020). A Magyar Királyság és a Szentszék kapcsolata I. Károly korában (1301–1342) [The Relationship of the Hungarian Kingdom and the Holy See in the time of Charles I (1301–1342)] (in Hungarian). Pécsi Tudományegyetem BTK TTI Középkori és Koraújkori Történeti Tanszék. ISBN 978-963-429-500-6.
- Sugár, István (1984). Az egri püspökök története [The History of the Bishops of Eger] (in Hungarian). Szent István Társulat. ISBN 963-360-392-7.
- Szende, László (2003). "Dörögdi III. Miklós [Nicholas III Dörögdi]". In Beke, Margit (ed.). Esztergomi érsekek 1001–2003 [Archbishops of Esztergom 1001–2003] (in Hungarian). Szent István Társulat. pp. 156–161. ISBN 963-361-472-4.
- Zsiray, Lajos (1972). "Adatok a Dörögdi család és a felsődörögdi plébániatemplom történetéhez [Contributions to the History of the Dörögdi Family and the Parish Church of Felsődörögd]". In Palágyi, Sylvia (ed.). A Veszprém megyei múzeumok közleményei 11 (in Hungarian). Veszprém Megyei Múzeumok Igazgatósága. pp. 251–259.

Nicholas House of Dörögdi Born: ? Died: 1361
Political offices
Preceded by Csanád Telegdi	Head of the royal chapel 1327	Succeeded by James of Piacenza
Catholic Church titles
Preceded by Boleslaus	Archbishop of Esztergom elected 1329–1330	Succeeded by Csanád Telegdi
Preceded by Csanád Telegdi	Bishop of Eger; 1330–1361	Succeeded by Michael Szécsényi
