= Battle of Capua (1348) =

Coordinates: 41°06′22″N 14°12′30″E

- Part of Neapolitan campaigns of Louis the Great
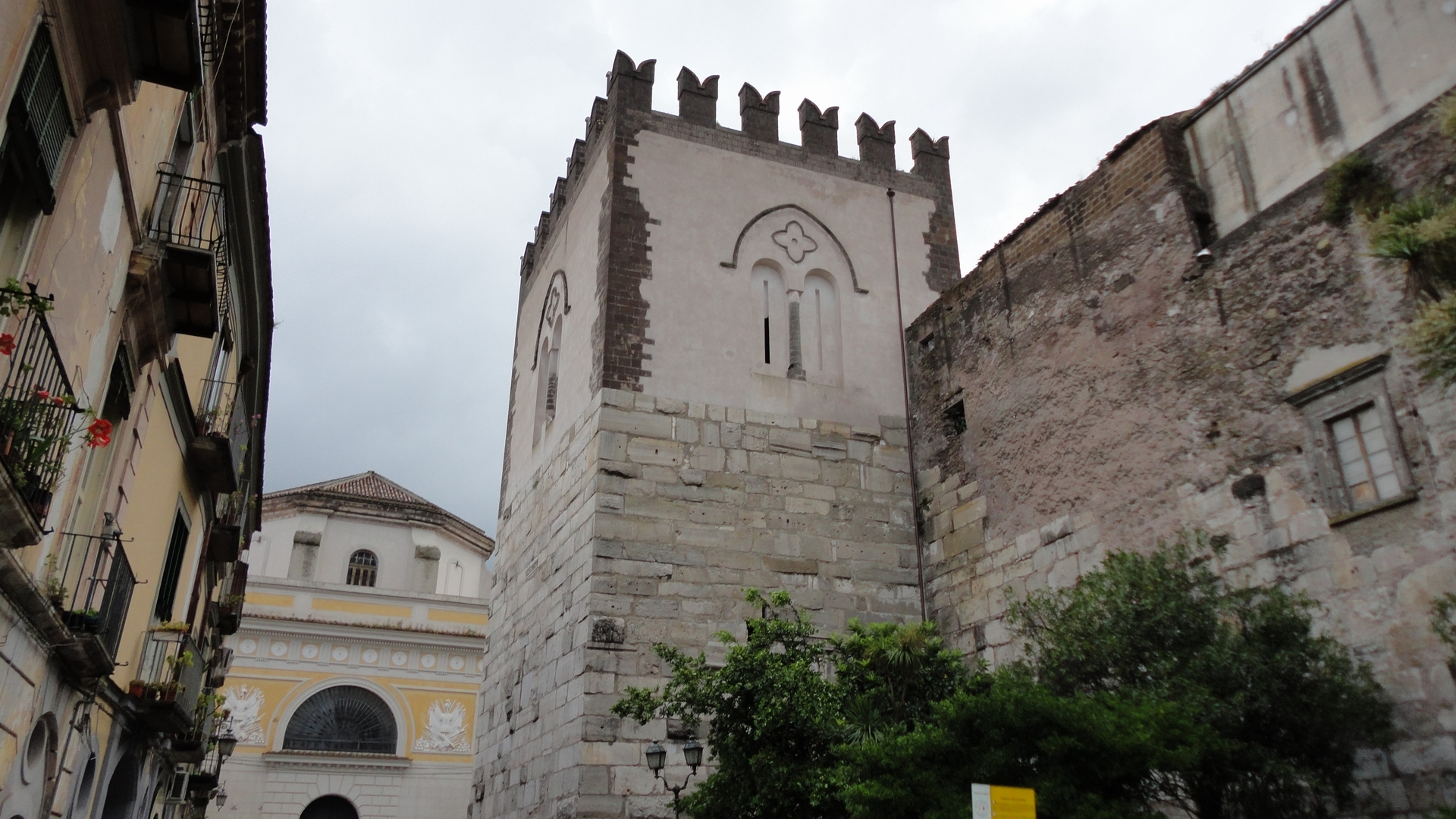
- Capua Fortress
Date	11–15 January 1348
Location	Capua, Kingdom of Naples
Result	Hungarian victory; Occupation of the kingdom

Belligerents
Kingdom of Hungary	Kingdom of Naples

Commanders and leaders
Niccolò Gaetano	Louis of Taranto; Charles of Durazzo

Strength
Cuman horse archers heavy cavalry	Few Germans; Few Catalans; Neapolitan irregulars 3,000 overall

Casualties and losses
Unknown	Very heavy

The Battle of Capua was fought between 11–15 January 1348 between the troops of Louis I of Hungary and those of the Kingdom of Naples, in the course of the former's invasion of Naples.

The Neapolitan troops, led by Queen Joan's second husband Louis of Taranto, were in the fortified town of Capua. Most of King Louis 's troops were Italian and German mercenaries and English longbowmen, considered unreliable; his more loyal Hungarian knights were unsuitable for the siege of fortresses. Therefore, King Louis avoided Capua and headed for Benevento with his troops. To cover this manoeuvre he ordered Niccolò Gaetano, Count of Fondi, to attack the bridgehead of river Volturno with the Hungarian and German cavalry and Lombard infantry.

Count Gaetano did not make a frontal attack against the bridgehead: he sent part of his force along the river Volturno, towards Orticella, where they crossed the river and launched a surprise attack on the right wing and rear of the Neapolitan army. The attacking troops consisted mainly of cavalry and some infantry.

Around 3 PM the Hungarian light cavalry got tired of the initial skirmishes which had ensued, and released a devastating flight of arrows on the Neapolitan cavalry; most of the latter lost their horses and had to fight on foot. Louis of Taranto ordered a countermarch but these turned suddenly in rout.

A smaller part of the Neapolitan army fled toward Teano, followed by Gaetano's cavalry. Most of them were killed or captured. The larger part of the Neapolitan army retreated in poor conditions to Naples under Louis of Taranto.

After the collapse the Neapolitan mercenaries started to escape from Capua, forcing the commander of Capua to capitulate. Some days later Queen Joan sailed to Provence, followed by her husband; subsequently the Kingdom of Naples fell to King Louis.

== Louis' Italian army ==
Louis' Italian army contained German mercenary infantry, Hungarian heavy knights and light cavalry from Hungary, and remarkable English longbowmen.

== Works cited ==
=== Books ===
- Bánlaky, József (1929). "2. Az első nápolyi hadjárat 1347–1348-ban" [2. The First Naples Campaign in 1947-1948]. A magyar nemzet hadtörténelme [Military history of the Hungarian nation] (in Hungarian). Budapest, Hungary: Grill Károly Könyvkiadó vállalata. ISBN 963-86118-7-1.
