= Nicholas I Vásári =

Hungarian nobleman

Nicholas (I) Vásári

Vice-voivode of Transylvania
- Reign: 1319–1320
- Predecessor: Achilles Torockói
- Successor: Achilles Torockói
- Died: between 1320 and 1333
- Noble family: House of Vásári
- Spouse: N Telegdi
- Issue: Nicholas II; John I Thomas I Beke two daughters
- Father: Roland Szügyi

Nicholas (I) Vásári (Hungarian: Vásári (I.) Miklós; died between 1320 and 1333) was a Hungarian nobleman at the turn of the 13th and 14th centuries, who served as Vice-voivode of Transylvania from 1319 to 1320.

== Life ==
His father was Roland Szügyi, a landowner in Nógrád County, who is mentioned by a single source in 1255. Roland later moved to Vásári in Bihar County. Nicholas first appears in contemporary records in March 1295 alongside his two brothers Gregory (fl. 1295–1327) and Lawrence (fl. 1295), when they were involved in a lawsuit over the determination of boundaries of their inherited land Vásári, and reached an agreement with their neighbor comes Peter Ajkai.

His early life and possible involvement in the clashes of the so-called feudal anarchy following the extinction of the Árpád dynasty is uncertain. He became a familiaris of the powerful military leader Dózsa Debreceni, an important and loyal soldier of Charles I of Hungary. After defeating the rebellious Borsa clan, Debreceni became lord of Bihar, Vásári's homeland. It is presumable he entered to his service thereafter. Vásári was appointed vice-voivode of Transylvania sometimes around August 1319, when his lord functioned as voivode of the province. Vásári held his dignity at least until 1 March 1320. He was replaced by Achilles Torockói by May 1321.

Nicholas I Vásári married an unidentified sister of Csanád Telegdi, the Archbishop of Esztergom from 1330 to 1349. Their marriage produced several children: his namesake son, Nicholas II himself was also an archbishop of Esztergom. His second son, John was a courtly knight in 1344, while Thomas served as ispán of Somogy County in 1371, but some sources also refer to him as Ban of Croatia in 1367. Nicholas' youngest son Beke was ispán of Aranyos Seat in 1344. Vásári also had two unidentified daughters, who married Stephen Vajdai and Ladislaus N, respectively. Nicholas Vásári, Sr. died sometimes between 1320 and 1333.

== Sources ==
- Engel, Pál (1996). Magyarország világi archontológiája, 1301–1457, I. [Secular Archontology of Hungary, 1301–1457, Volume I] (in Hungarian). História, MTA Történettudományi Intézete. ISBN 963-8312-44-0.
- Hegedűs, András (2003). "Vásári IV. Miklós [Nicholas IV Vásári]". In Beke, Margit (ed.). Esztergomi érsekek 1001–2003 [Archbishops of Esztergom 1001–2003] (in Hungarian). Szent István Társulat. pp. 171–175. ISBN 963-361-472-4.

Nicholas I House of Vásári Born: ? Died: 1320/33
Political offices
Preceded by Achilles Torockói	Vice-voivode of Transylvania; 1319–1320	Succeeded by Achilles Torockói
