= Hronské Kosihy =

Hronské Kosihy Garamkeszi
- Municipality
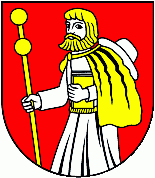
- Flag Coat of arms

- Location of Hronské Kosihy in the Nitra Region Location of Hronské Kosihy in Slovakia
- Coordinates: 48.27°N 18.60°E
- Country: Slovakia
- Region: Nitra Region
- District: Levice District
- First mentioned: 1294

Area
  - Total: 7.08 km^{2} (2.73 sq mi)
- Elevation: 171 m (561 ft)

Population (2025)
  - Total: 810
- Time zone: UTC+1 (CET)
  - Summer (DST): UTC+2 (CEST)
- Postal code: 935 27
- Area code: +421 36
- Vehicle registration plate (until 2022): LV
- Website: www.hronskekosihy.sk

Hronské Kosihy (Hungarian: Garamkeszi) is a village and municipality in the Levice District in the Nitra Region of Slovakia.

== Etymology ==
The village was named after the Magyar tribe Keszi.

== History ==
In historical records the village was first mentioned in 1294.

== Geography ==
The municipality lies at an altitude of 171 metres (561 ft) and covers an area of 7.08 km^{2} (2.73 sq mi) (2025).

== Population ==
Population statistic (10 years)
Year	1995	2005	2015	2025
Count	652	673	688	810
Difference		+3.22%	+2.22%	+17.73%

Population statistic
Year	2024	2025
Count	790	810
Difference		+2.53%

It has a population of 810 people (31 December 2025).

=== Ethnicity ===
Census 2021 (1+ %)
Ethnicity	Number	Fraction
Slovak	686	92.45%
Not found out	43	5.79%
Romani	32	4.31%
Vietnamese	12	1.61%
Hungarian	10	1.34%
Total	742	

In year 2021 was 742 people by ethnicity 686 as Slovak, 43 as Not found out, 32 as Romani, 12 as Vietnamese, 10 as Hungarian, 6 as Czech, 2 as Polish, 1 as Rusyn, 1 as Russian, 1 as Other and 1 as English.

Note on population: The difference values of population numbers in the table "Population statistic" and in the sections "Ethnicity" & "Religion" is caused by the use of various statistical methods.

=== Religion ===
Census 2021 (1+ %)
Religion	Number	Fraction
Roman Catholic Church	570	76.82%
None	115	15.5%
Not found out	34	4.58%
Evangelical Church	9	1.21%
Total	742	

In year 2021 was 742 people by religion 570 from Roman Catholic Church, 115 from None, 34 from Not found out, 9 from Evangelical Church, 4 from Greek Catholic Church, 4 from Ad hoc movements, 2 from Calvinist Church, 2 from Christian Congregations in Slovakia, 1 from Paganism and natural spirituality and 1 from Church of the Brethren.

== Facilities ==
The village has a public library and a football pitch.

== Genealogical resources ==
The records for genealogical research are available at the state archive "Statny Archiv in Nitra, Slovakia"

- Roman Catholic church records (births/marriages/deaths): 1733-1895 (parish B)

== See also ==
- List of municipalities and towns in Slovakia
