= Taliándörögd =

- Flag Coat of arms

- Location of Veszprém county in Hungary

- Location of Taliándörögd
- Coordinates: 46.98054°N 17.56730°E
- Country: Hungary
- County: Veszprém

Area
  - Total: 28.08 km^{2} (10.84 sq mi)

Population (2004)
  - Total: 721
  - Density: 25.67/km^{2} (66.5/sq mi)
- Time zone: UTC+1 (CET)
  - Summer (DST): UTC+2 (CEST)
- Postal code: 8295
- Area code: 87

Taliándörögd is a village in Veszprém county, Hungary.
