= Šarovce =

Šarovce Sáró
- Municipality
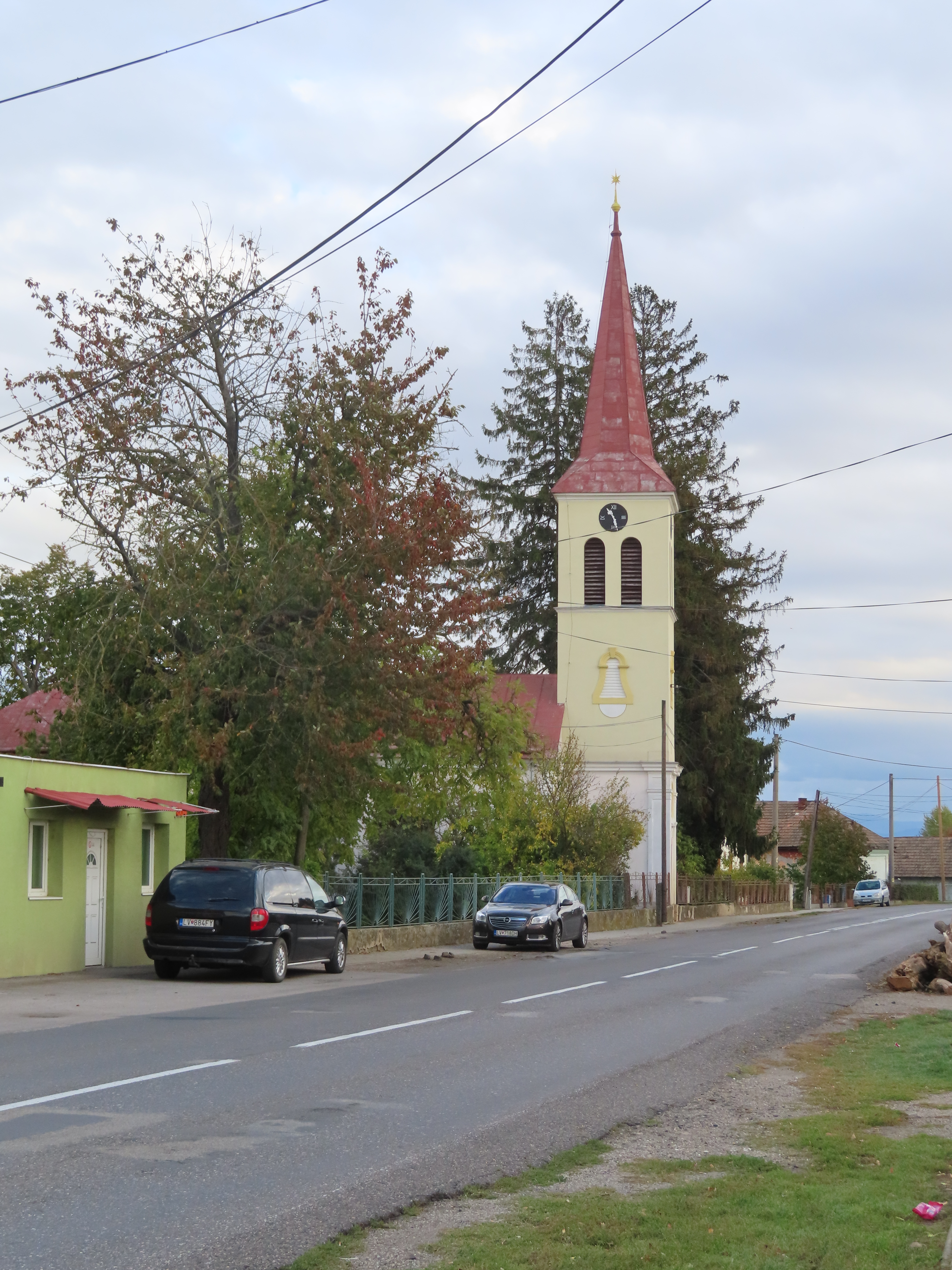

- Flag

- Location of Šarovce in the Nitra Region Location of Šarovce in Slovakia
- Coordinates: 48.10°N 18.63°E
- Country: Slovakia
- Region: Nitra Region
- District: Levice District
- First mentioned: 1075

Area
  - Total: 25.37 km^{2} (9.80 sq mi)
- Elevation: 147 m (482 ft)

Population (2025)
  - Total: 1,619
- Time zone: UTC+1 (CET)
  - Summer (DST): UTC+2 (CEST)
- Postal code: 935 52
- Area code: +421 36
- Vehicle registration plate (until 2022): LV
- Website: www.sarovce.sk

Šarovce (Hungarian: Sáró) is a village and municipality in the Levice District in the Nitra Region of Slovakia.

== History ==
In historical records the village was first mentioned in 1075.

== Geography ==
The municipality lies at an altitude of 147 metres (482 ft) and covers an area of 25.37 km^{2} (9.80 sq mi) (2025).

== Population ==
Population statistic (10 years)
| Year | 1995 | 2005 | 2015 | 2025 |
|---|---|---|---|---|
| Count | 1660 | 1659 | 1643 | 1619 |
| Difference | | −0.06% | −0.96% | −1.46% |

Population statistic
| Year | 2024 | 2025 |
|---|---|---|
| Count | 1619 | 1619 |
| Difference | | −1.42% |

It has a population of 1619 people (31 December 2025).

=== Ethnicity ===
Census 2021 (1+ %)
| Ethnicity | Number | Fraction |
|---|---|---|
| Slovak | 805 | 50.12% |
| Hungarian | 623 | 38.79% |
| Romani | 218 | 13.57% |
| Not found out | 207 | 12.88% |
| Total | 1606 | |

In year 2021 was 1606 people by ethnicity 805 as Slovak, 623 as Hungarian, 218 as Romani, 207 as Not found out, 15 as Czech, 1 as Ukrainian, 1 as Italian, 1 as Romanian, 1 as Polish and 1 as English.

Note on population: The difference values of population numbers in the table "Population statistic" and in the sections "Ethnicity" & "Religion" is caused by the use of various statistical methods.

=== Religion ===
Census 2021 (1+ %)
| Religion | Number | Fraction |
|---|---|---|
| Roman Catholic Church | 891 | 55.48% |
| None | 386 | 24.03% |
| Not found out | 185 | 11.52% |
| Calvinist Church | 69 | 4.3% |
| Evangelical Church | 36 | 2.24% |
| Total | 1606 | |

In year 2021 was 1606 people by religion 891 from Roman Catholic Church, 386 from None, 185 from Not found out, 69 from Calvinist Church, 36 from Evangelical Church, 12 from Other, 12 from Greek Catholic Church, 7 from Christian Congregations in Slovakia, 4 from Jehovah's Witnesses, 3 from United Methodist Church and 1 from Eastern Orthodox Church.

== Facilities ==
Sarovce has a public library, a sports gymnasium, and a football pitch.
