= Csanád Telegdi =

Hungarian prelate

- Archbishop of Esztergom
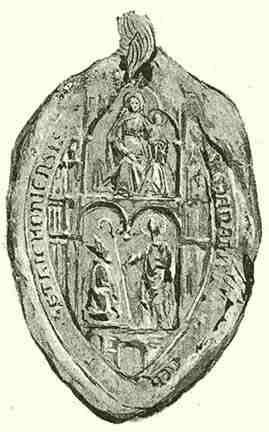
- Seal of Csanád Telegdi, 1342
- Installed: 1330
- Term ended: 1349
- Predecessor: Nicholas Dörögdi (elected)
- Successor: Nicholas Vásári
- Other posts: Provost of Várad; Bishop of Eger

Orders
- Consecration: 23 January 1323 by Benedict of Csanád

Personal details
- Born: c. 1280
- Died: September/December 1349
- Denomination: Roman Catholic
- Parents: Thomas Telegdi
- Coat of arms

Csanád Telegdi (Hungarian: Telegdi Csanád; died 1349) was a Hungarian prelate in the first half of the 14th century. He served as Bishop of Eger from 1322 to 1330, then Archbishop of Esztergom from 1330 until his death. Descending from an old Hungarian kindred, he was a confidant of the ruling Capetian House of Anjou. He crowned Louis I of Hungary in July 1342. The complete renovation of the Esztergom Cathedral took place during his archiepiscopate.

== Ancestry and early life ==
Csanád Telegdi was born into the ancient Hungarian gens Csanád around 1280, as one of the four sons of comes Thomas. The namesake founder of the clan was the nephew of the first Hungarian king Stephen I of Hungary, who sent his relative to defeat the rebellious lord Ajtony around 1030. Thereafter Csanád County and its capital, in addition to the clan, was named after him. The Telegdis' first known direct ancestors are Benedict (or Belenig) and his son, Clement (also Kelemenes), the ispán of Arad County in the early 13th century. Csanád's father Thomas was an educated man with the title of magister. He had various conflicts with the Cuman tribes, who lived in Temes. He left his estates in Csanád County in the 1290s and moved to Bihar County, establishing his manor seat in Telegd (present-day Tileagd, Romania). His descendants took their surname after the village. Csanád had three brothers: Lawrence I, Nicholas I, ispán of various counties, who fought in the Battle of Rozgony, and Pancras, the father of Thomas Telegdi, also an archbishop of Esztergom. Csanád also had two unidentified sisters: one of them married vice-voivode Nicholas Vásári, their son was Nicholas, Csanád's immediate successor in the archiepiscopal seat of Esztergom. Csanád's second sister was the wife of a certain Michael, they had a son named Stephen.

Telegdi studied in the collegiate school of Várad (present-day Oradea Mare, Romania). He was referred to as cantor of the cathedral chapter by a document in 1295. He attended an Italian universitas – presumably the University of Padua – between 1296 and 1299, obtaining the degree of decretorum doctor, which indicated his competence in canon law. Returning Hungary, he stayed in the chapter of Várad, where he was again styled as cantor. He was first mentioned as lector in October 1306. In this capacity, he issued a charter on 9 June 1315, which reflected his theological and Christian philosophical knowledge. He used Biblical terminology (for instance, a reference to Adam as "first creature" and his "vile offspring") in the document's prelude (arenga), in which he determined the importance of registering official documents ("through the courtesy of the Heavenly Creator [...] people have found this knowledge"), while recorded the donation of two landholdings to the Diocese of Transylvania. On 12 May 1316, Telegdi was referred to as the vicar and prothonotarius ("principal clerk") of the elderly Emeric, Bishop of Várad. Telegdi was elected provost of the chapter of Várad on 5 February 1318, replacing Ivánka, who became Emeric's successor in the episcopal seat. In this capacity, he founded three altars at the Cathedral of St. Mary based on his own wealth. He also established a minor provostship in opposite the cathedral. At the same time, he has gained wealth in the area, for instance, he bought vineyard in January 1321, in the neighborhood of the land of his late brother Lawrence's orphans.

The entire Telegdi family supported the claim of Charles during the period of Interregnum in the first decade of the 14th century and the subsequent unification war against the oligarchs. It resulted that Csanád Telegdi became a confidant of Charles in his royal court. He was styled as head (count) of the royal chapel (Latin: comes capellae regiae) and "secret notary" (Latin: secretarius notarius) in a document issued in July 1319. In this quality, he supervised the convent of the royal chaplains, guarded the royal relic treasures and exercised jurisdiction over those servant laymen, who secured the liturgical activity of the court clergy. Under his tenure, the restructured royal chapel became a separate diploma issuing institution and place of authentication, which also proved to be a school of highly qualified diplomats and legal staff. Telegdi also served as keeper of the royal seal and director of the place of authentication in the royal court beside that. A bull of Pope John XXII called him "secret chancellor" of the Hungarian royal court in July 1320. In that year, Telegdi visited the papal court at Avignon in order to fulfill both ecclesiastical and diplomatic functions. Charles I requested Pope John to marry Elizabeth, the daughter of King Władysław I of Poland, and Telegdi's main task was to negotiate the matter in the Roman Curia. His success was marked by two papal letters issued in July and August 1320. Through Telegdi, the pope also allowed Charles I to choose his own confessor in order to get absolution from the sins which he had committed against the church. Telegdi also requested absolution for the visitors of the altars in the Diocese of Várad which had been established by him previously. Telegdi submitted to the Pope the King's request for the confirmation of Andrew Szécsi as the Bishop of Transylvania, despite his young age and deficiency in priesthood. In addition, of the 11 papal letters issued at the time of his diplomatic mission, 7 dealt with church benefices (for instance, the installment of his nephew Nicholas Vásári to the chapter of Várad). In April 1320, Telegdi was appointed conservator of the Cistercian abbey of the Diocese of Chalon-sur-Saône, along with the provost of Avignon and the prior of St. Rufus monastery in the Diocese of Valence. Telegdi also bore the title of papal chaplain in 1321. Upon the request of Csanád Telegdi, Charles I returned the previously lost estates of Tömörkény, Zenta (Senta), Csóka (Čoka), Szanád (Sanad), Varsány and Tarján to his family in the same year. He was also granted lands in Szatmár County (e.g. Érvasad, present-day Vășad in Romania) by Charles' wife Queen Elizabeth.

== Bishop of Eger ==
Following the death of Bishop Martin in early 1322, Telegdi was elected unanimously as his successor by the grand provost and the cathedral chapter of Eger. He was first mentioned in this capacity on 8 October 1322. Under customary law, the cathedral chapter requested Boleslaus of Esztergom to confirm his election, but the archbishop was temporarily incapacitated for some reasons (possibly due to his involvement in the Dalmatian conflict) and handed over the task to his provost Theophil, giving him the rights. Conducting appropriate inquests, Theophil confirmed the election of Telegdi at the St. George's Cathedral in Temesvár (present-day Timișoara, Romania) on 21 January 1323. Temesvár was the royal residence of Charles I between 1315 and 1323. Telegdi was consecrated as bishop by Bishop Benedict of Csanád with the assistance of Nicholas Kőszegi, Bishop of Győr and Ivánka, Bishop of Várad at the Dominicans' St. Ladislaus church on 23 January. The ceremony was also attended by Ladislaus Jánki, the Archbishop of Kalocsa.

Shortly thereafter his consecration, Telegdi requested Charles on 24 April to revive and confirm the privileges of the Diocese of Eger, which were granted by Stephen V of Hungary in 1271. Upon his request, Charles forbade Palatine Philip Drugeth, who governed the whole province, where the diocese laid, to arbitrarily confiscate the tithe and other revenues of the bishopric on the next day. Charles I donated the land of Vrus (today Gyöngyösoroszi) in April 1324 to the diocese, which had formerly already belonged to them, but lost during the era of feudal anarchy. In September 1324, Charles I also transcribed the 1281 privilege letter of Ladislaus IV, regarding the lordship of Tiszanána. Telegdi was a founding member of the Order of Saint George, the first secular chivalric order in the world, which was established by Charles on 24 April 1326. During his episcopate, Telegdi was involved in various lawsuits within the Hungarian ecclesiastical institutional system. For instance, he represented the interests of Henry, Bishop of Veszprém in February 1327, when the prelate accused Archbishop Boleslaus with unauthorized possession of some churches and their benefices in his diocese (the so-called "trial over the tithes of Sasad"). He acted as a judge in the trial over a mill between the Pauline and Augustinian friars in Sátoraljaújhely. He was one of the four prelates, who excommunicated John, abbot of Pilis and monk Nicholas for their violent actions against the parsonage of Budakalász in September 1326. There are also some charters, which suggest, Telegdi validated his interests even against his own collegiate chapter and the provostships (e.g. Szepes), which laid in the neighboring territories. Under his own suzerainty, Telegdi established the Archdeaconry of Tárca (today Torysky, Slovakia), which laid in Sáros County, on 16 October 1323, separating from the territory of the existing Archdeaconry of Abaúj, which belonged to the authority of the Provostship of Szepes (Spiš). This resulted a long-standing conflict between the provostship and the Diocese of Eger over the sparsely populated area. Telegdi agreed with the local nobles who settled the area – who also exercised the right of patronage over the local churches – that the parishioners of the villages there owed tithes to the bishop of Eger, to the detriment of the Szepes Chapter. The local priests appealed against this decision to the Holy See, as under the jurisdiction of the provost of Szepes, a third of the tenth belonged to them communally. The lawsuit was settled only at the time of Telegdi's successor. During his 8-year episcopate, Telegdi's sole vicar was a certain magister Peter, the archdeacon of Zemplén.

== Archbishop of Esztergom ==
=== Confidant of the Anjous ===
Boleslaus of Esztergom died in December 1328. The collegiate chapter initially elected his protege Nicholas Dörögdi as his successor in the beginning of next year. However the royal couple, King Charles and Queen Elizabeth were dissatisfied with his person for unknown reasons. As a result, Pope John XXII refused to confirm Dörögdi's election despite the fact that the prelate personally visited the papal court at Avignon after some trouble with robber knights during his travel. Charles made it clear that he supported Csanád Telegdi to fill the position. To resolve the diplomatic conflict, Pope John decided to perform personal exchange between the sees of Esztergom and Eger; he transferred Telegdi from the Diocese of Eger to the Archdiocese of Esztergom on 17 September 1330, while Dörögdi was made Bishop of Eger two weeks later, on 1 October. According to the bull of Pope John XXII, dated 15 January 1331, he gave Telegdi's pallium to envoys cleric Nicholas of Várad (his nephew) and Benedictine friar Anselm to bring it to Hungary. To express his gratitude, Telegdi donated the village of Demjén, Heves County to the cathedral chapter of Eger on 3 March 1331, for their assistance in his promotion to the metropolitan seat. As Telegdi argued this land donation contributed to strengthen and secure the episcopal castle. Telegdi paid his servitium commune in full as Archbishop of Esztergom in November 1331.

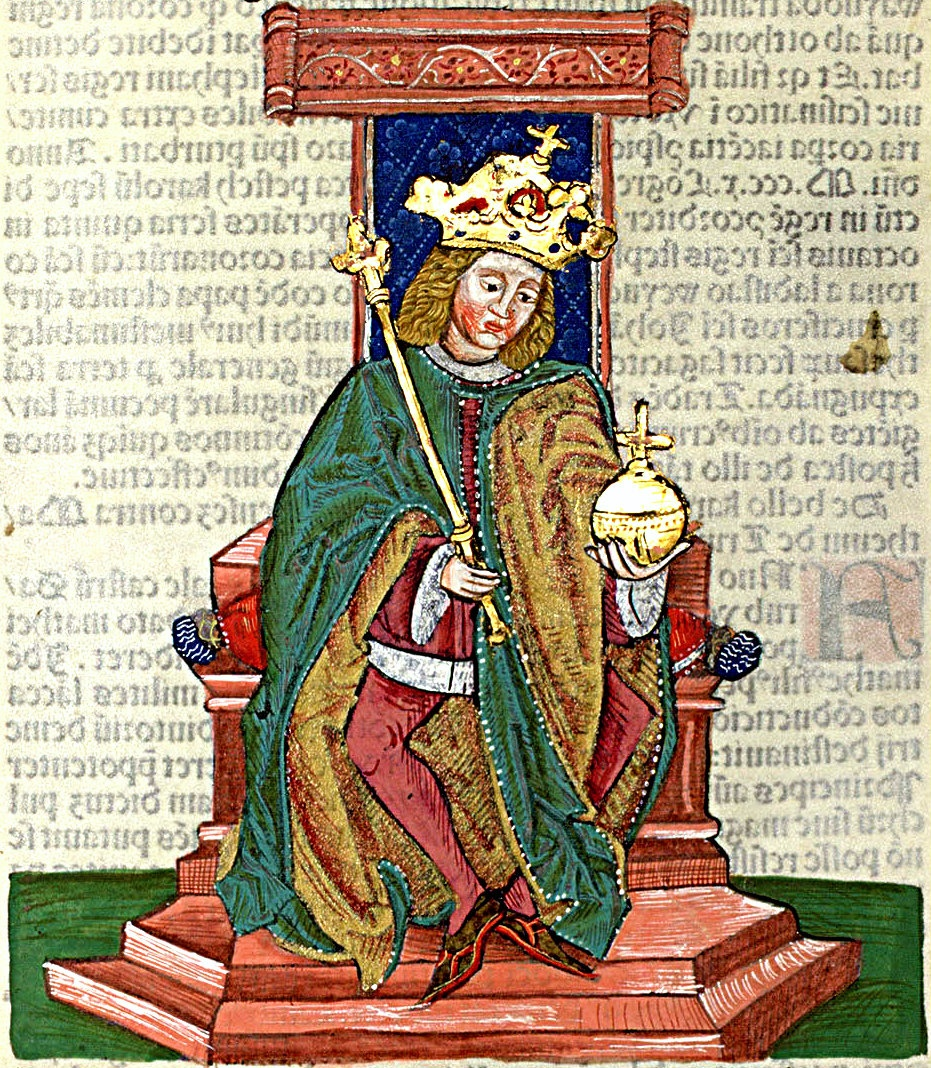
Charles I of Hungary

Upon his request, Charles I renewed the privilege of the archdiocese on 15 March 1332, regarding the collection of tithe beyond the Drava river, which right was donated by Béla IV and Stephen V to the archbishopric. Thereafter Charles I confirmed all privileges of Esztergom on 14 June by transcribing the royal charter of Béla IV, issued in 1262 on the occasion of Philip Türje's appointment. Becoming his godfather, Telegdi baptized the royal couple's youngest son Stephen, who was born on 20 August 1332. On this solemn occasion, he was granted oppidum Kürt in Komárom County (present-day Strekov in Slovakia). When Charles visited his uncle, Robert, in Naples in July 1333, Telegdi was among the dignitaries, who escorted the royal. There Charles' second son, Andrew, was betrothed to Robert's granddaughter, Joanna, who had been made her grandfather's heir. Simultaneously, Pope John XXII issued a document on 1 August, in which he provisionally authorized to the archbishop of Kalocsa and the bishops of Várad and Zagreb to crown Charles' eldest son Louis in the absence, prevention or death of the archbishop of Esztergom. The pope did this as a precaution, since Charles suffered from febrile illness during his trip. Other historians – István Katona and István Sugár – argued, however, Charles intended to crown his eldest surviving son Louis still in his own life, but Telegdi refused to do that, referring to the traditional role of the Hungarian Estates in the royal succession process. This assumption does not seem probable, as Telegdi retained his good relationship with the monarch until the latter's death. For instance, when a group of bishops made a complaint to Pope Benedict XII against Charles in 1338, because he had taken possession of Church property, in addition to his ecclesiastical policy, which "would jeopardize their interests", Telegdi did not join their movement and remained loyal to the king. The pope sent his reply letter to the bishops via Archbishop Telegdi and Bishop Dörögdi in February 1339.

Under his archiepiscopate, the jurisdiction conflict with the Archdiocese of Kraków over the Szepesség region has ended in 1332, when papal legate and provost Prot ruled in favour of Kraków, however Telegdi invoked the privilege granted by Pope Innocent IV in 1254, which made a special order for the application of ecclesiastical punishment against the Archidocese of Esztergom for papal delegates, legates, conservators and executors, or their deputies. During the trial, in 1333, Telegdi turned to the abbots of Pilis and Zirc for assistance, as the document of 1254 authorized these Cistercian superiors to ensure that the privilege granted to the archbishop was respected. As a result, the document in which the said abbots forbade the bishops of Eger and Veszprém – Nicholas Dörögdi and Henry, respectively –, who should have acted on the instructions of the provost Prot, to excommunicate Telegdi and chapter of Esztergom and to place the church of Esztergom under interdict.

Charles I died in Visegrád on 16 July 1342. His corpse was first delivered to Buda where a Mass was said by Telegdi for his soul. In his speech, which portions were preserved by the Buda Chronicle, the Dubnic Chronicle and Johannes de Thurocz's Chronica Hungarorum, the archbishop used same trope and terminology, as twenty-seven years ago. He described Charles' death with Biblical parallels, referring to the "original sin" and hence "the general and unchangeable law of death". Its structure is largely the same as that of the Funeral Sermon and Prayer. Arriving to Székesfehérvár, Telegdi crowned Louis I king with the Holy Crown of Hungary on 21 July. He delivered a praising speech there too, but it has not been preserved in contemporary sources or later chronicles. When the young Louis launched his Neapolitan campaign against his brother's murderer Joanna, Telegdi acted as royal governor (viceroy) in the Kingdom of Hungary between 1347 and 1348. Csanád Telegdi died between around September and December 1349. He was succeeded by his nephew Nicholas Vásári.

=== Restoration of the Cathedral ===
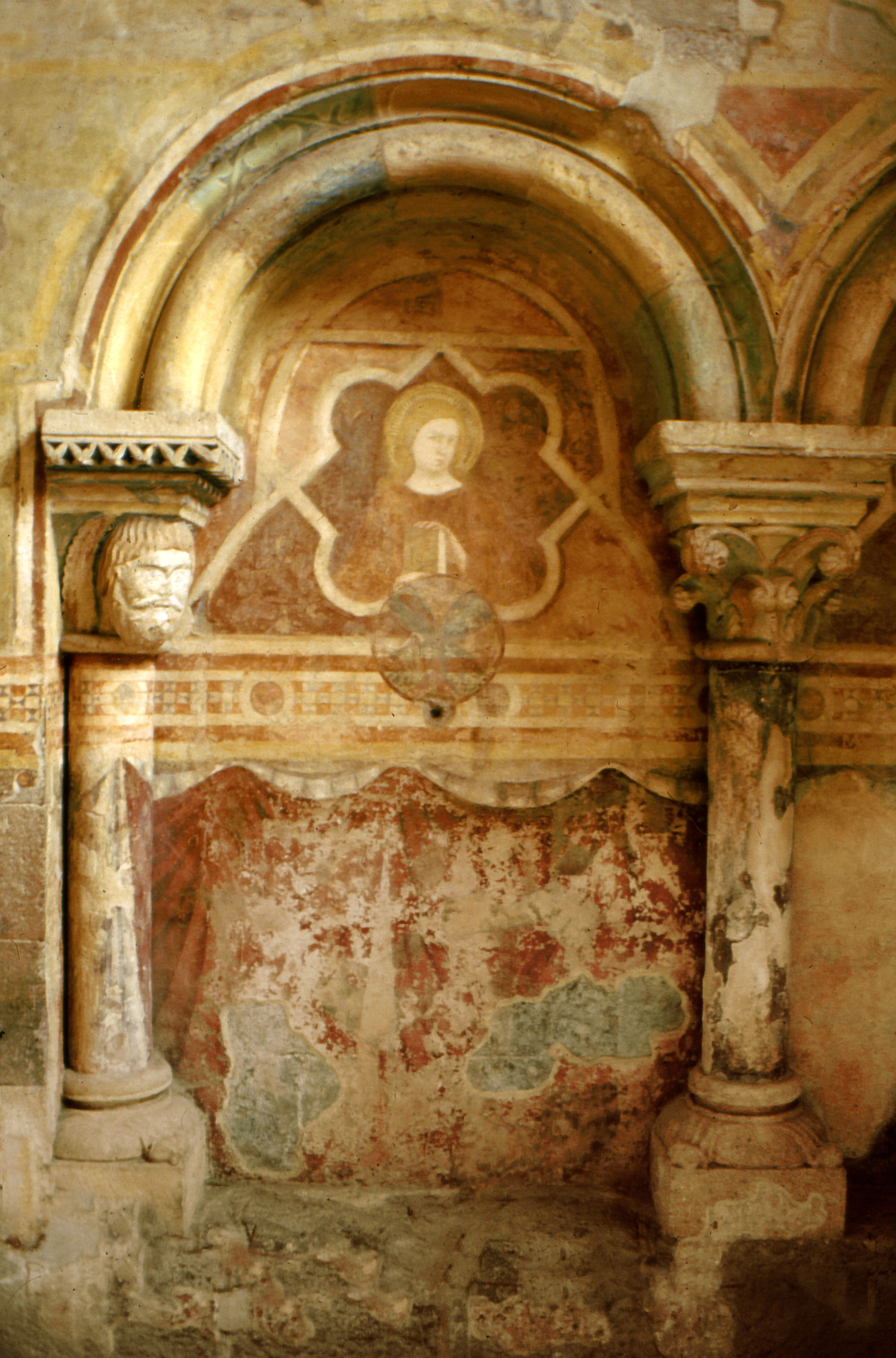
Details of frescos in the Castle Chapel of Esztergom

Pope John XXII proclaimed the compulsory delivery of the tenth of church income in the whole Christian world to the Holy See in the upcoming six years, in order to liberate the Holy Land. During the archiepiscopal tenure of Telegdi, papal tax collectors visited the dioceses of Hungary between 1332 and 1337. As the dioceses refused to fulfill the command, the pope sent his two liquidators Jacobus Berengarii and Raymundus de Bonofato to Hungary. In response, Charles I allowed the collection of the papal tithe (the tenth part of the Church revenues) in his realms only after the Holy See agreed to give one third of the money collected to him. The collection process in the Archdiocese of Esztergom was supervised by Bonofato, then Jacobus de Lengres after his death. Telegdi did not seem to be cooperative according to the letter of Pope Benedict XII in August 1339, when the archbishop allegedly refused to present a list of assets previously counted. Telegdi recovered several lands for his metropolitan seat during his episcopate: for instance, he regained Nezsider (today Neusiedl am See, Austria) in 1332, which Boleslaus had failed years earlier. He exchanged Bogdány (present-day Bohdanovce nad Trnavou, Slovakia) for Bél and Sáró (today eľký Biel and Šarovce in Slovakia, respectively) and two mills in Szentgyörgyfalva across the Garam (Hron) river in 1339. Telegdi increased his own wealth simultaneously: Louis I donated the village of Tárnok and its revenues and river duty in Csanád County for his family in April 1343. Upon the intercession of Telegdi, Franciscan friars were settled down in his family centre Telegd in 1339. The archbishop caused controversy when increased the strictly hierarchical staff (38 members) of the collegiate chapter of Esztergom with one person. He re-established the provostship of Szentgyörgymező (today a borough of Esztergom) and raised the number of its canons from four to eight persons. Despite the intention of Louis I and Pope Clement VI, Telegdi successfully prevented the establishment of the Diocese of Szepes (Spiš) in 1348 (finally, it was created only three centuries later, in 1776).

Continuing the efforts of his predecessors Thomas and Boleslaus in the previous decades, Telegdi finished the complete restoration and reconstruction of St. Adalbert Cathedral in Esztergom. The contemporary so-called Acephalus Codex reported in detail on the construction works. According to the chronicle, Telegdi ordered to rebuild the sanctuary "with polished and carefully carved stones, columns, strong foundations, wonderfully crafted stone beams and great vault", and decorate it with stained glass windows, while the exterior walls were strengthened in order to avoid such devastation like in 1304 by the Bohemian troops. Telegdi also rebuilt the old and collapsed towers of the cathedral. During his tenure, the archbishop's palace, uninhabited for a long time, was also restored and built two chapels in the neighborhood. He erected a stone wall around Víziváros (Latin: Civitas archiepiscopalis) too, while established many churches there. He invited painters from Italy, who belonged to the Sienese School and Ambrogio Lorenzetti, to decorate the castle chapels with frescoes. These works represent the earliest and purest examples of the Italian Trecento art in Central Europe. Eight saints were portrayed at the nave of the cathedral, while two fragments of the Christ in Majesty (Latin: Maiestas Domini) preserved above the Archbishop's throne. The depictions of the life of Jesus were definitely made just before the outbreak of the Black Death.

== Sources ==
- Engel, Pál (1996). Magyarország világi archontológiája, 1301–1457, I. [Secular Archontology of Hungary, 1301–1457, Volume I] (in Hungarian). História, MTA Történettudományi Intézete. ISBN 963-8312-44-0.
- Kristó, Gyula (1998). "Szövegpárhuzam Telegdi Csanád érsek „műveiben" [Text Parallels in the "Works" of Archbishop Csanád Telegdi]". In Csukovits, Enikő (ed.). Tanulmányok Borsa Iván tiszteletére (in Hungarian). National Archives of Hungary. pp. 173–175. ISBN 963-631-091-2.
- Maléth, Ágnes (2019). "The ambassadors of Charles I of Hungary in the papal curia (1301–1342)". In Mathieu, Isabelle; Matz, Jean-Michel (eds.). Formations et cultures des officiers et de l'entourage des princes dans les territoires angevins (milieu XIIIe–fin XVe siècle). École française de Rome. pp. 165–186. ISBN 978-272-8313-65-5.
- Maléth, Ágnes (2020). A Magyar Királyság és a Szentszék kapcsolata I. Károly korában (1301–1342) [The Relationship of the Hungarian Kingdom and the Holy See in the time of Charles I (1301–1342)] (in Hungarian). Pécsi Tudományegyetem BTK TTI Középkori és Koraújkori Történeti Tanszék. ISBN 978-963-429-500-6.
- Markó, László (2006). A magyar állam főméltóságai Szent Istvántól napjainkig: Életrajzi Lexikon [Great Officers of State in Hungary from King Saint Stephen to Our Days: A Biographical Encyclopedia] (in Hungarian). Helikon Kiadó. ISBN 963-208-970-7.
- Petrovics, István (1991). "Megjegyzések Telegdi Csanád egri püspökké szentelése kapcsán [Remarks on the Enthronement of Csanád Telegdi as Bishop of Eger]". Acta Universitatis Szegediensis de Attila József nominatae. Acta Historica (in Hungarian). 92. MTA-SZTE-MOL Magyar Medievisztikai Kutatócsoport: 43–50. ISSN 0324-6965.
- Sugár, István (1984). Az egri püspökök története [The History of the Bishops of Eger] (in Hungarian). Szent István Társulat. ISBN 963-360-392-7.
- Szende, László (2003). "Telegdi Csanád [Csanád Telegdi]". In Beke, Margit (ed.). Esztergomi érsekek 1001–2003 [Archbishops of Esztergom 1001–2003] (in Hungarian). Szent István Társulat. pp. 161–171. ISBN 963-361-472-4.

Csanád House of Telegdi Born: c. 1280 Died: 1349
Political offices
Preceded by Unknown	Head of the royal chapel 1319–1322	Succeeded by Nicholas Dörögdi
Catholic Church titles
Preceded by Martin	Bishop of Eger; 1322–1330	Succeeded by Nicholas Dörögdi
Preceded by Nicholas Dörögdi elected	Archbishop of Esztergom; 1330–1349	Succeeded by Nicholas Vásári
