= Oberloisdorf =

- Municipality
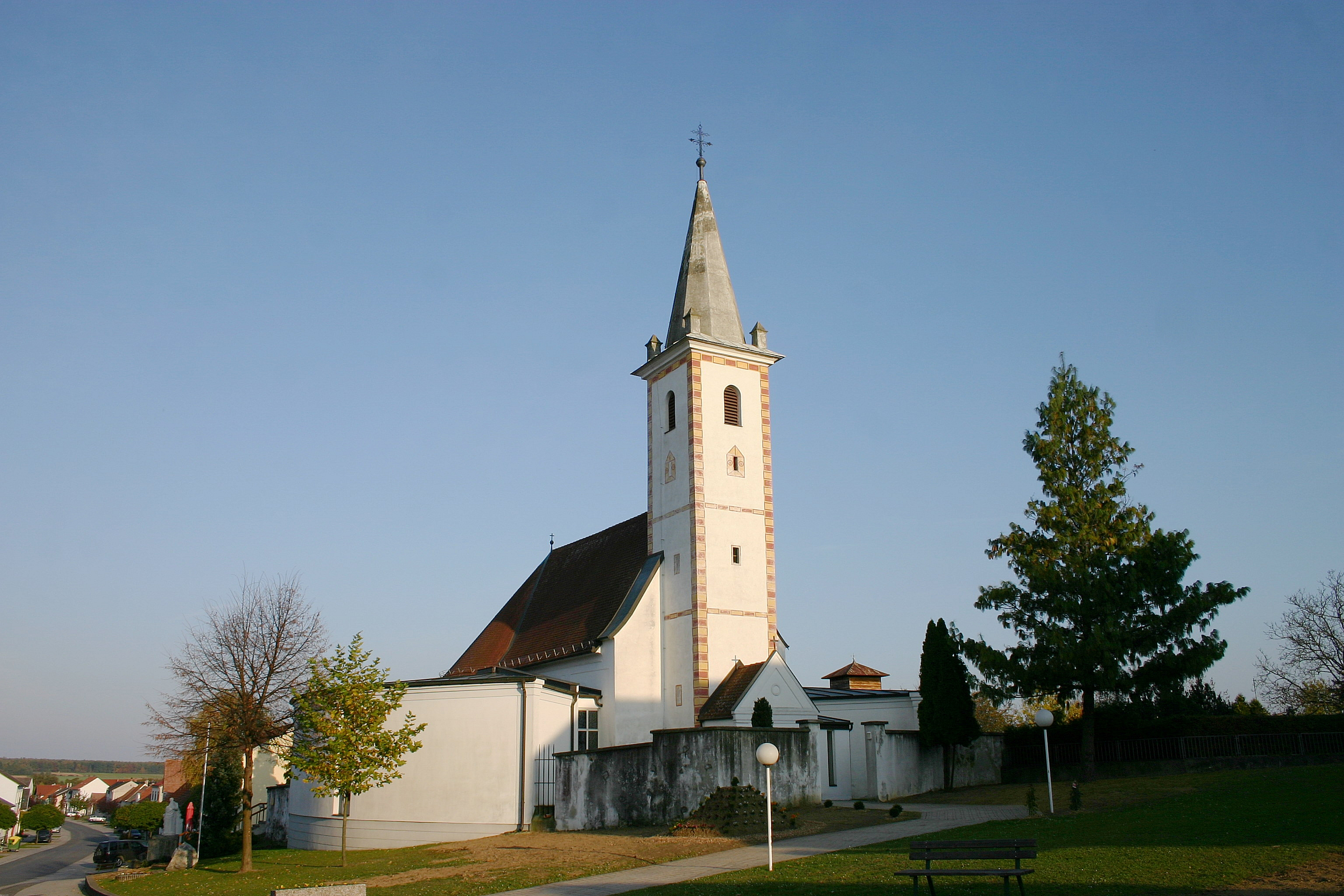
- Saint Roch Church

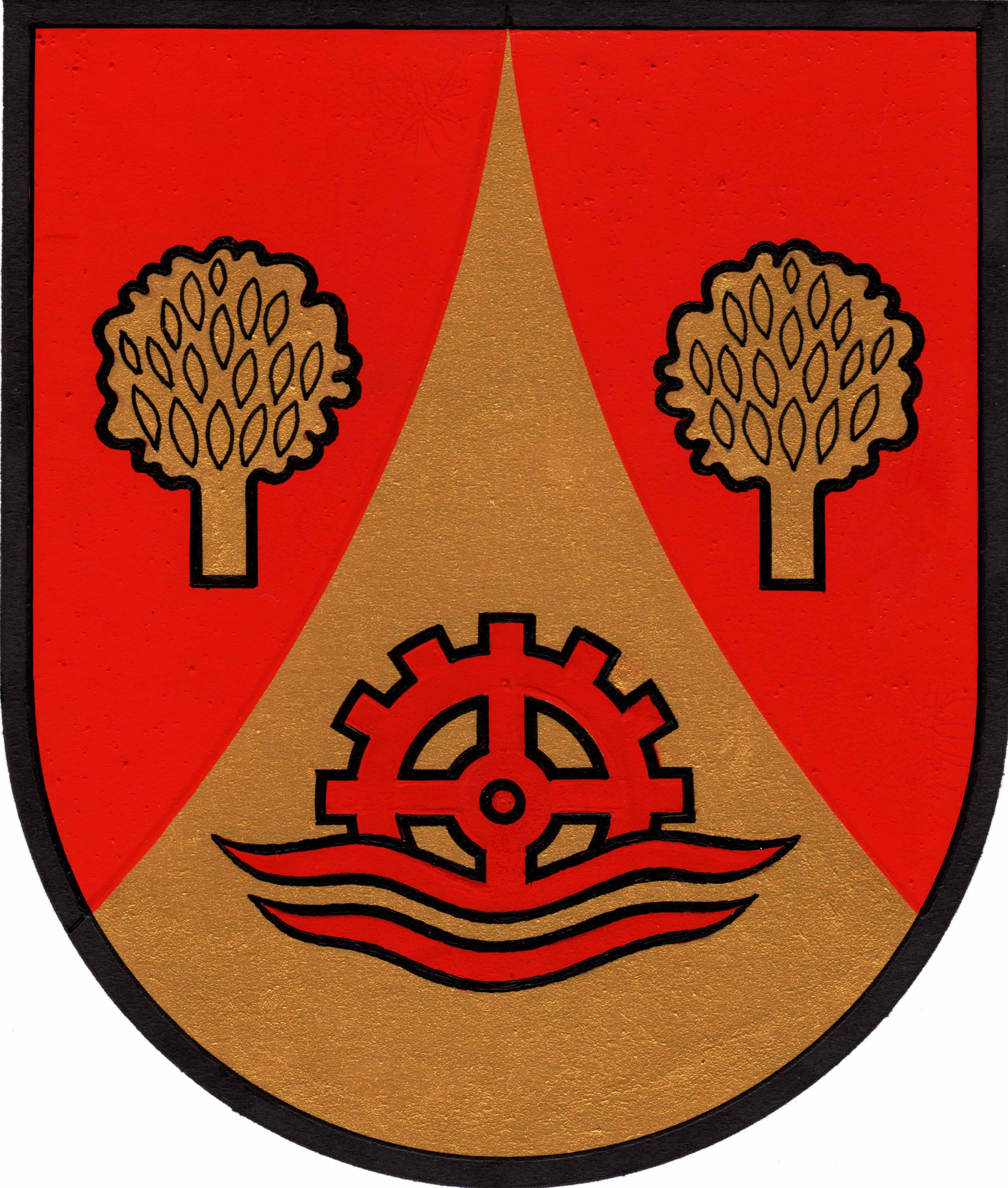
- Coat of arms

- Location within Austria
- Coordinates: 47°27′N 16°30′E
- Country: Austria
- State: Burgenland
- District: Oberpullendorf

Government
  - Mayor: Manfred Jestl (ÖVP)

Area
  - Total: 10.65 km^{2} (4.11 sq mi)
- Elevation: 254 m (833 ft)

Population (2018-01-01)
  - Total: 806
  - Density: 75.7/km^{2} (196/sq mi)
- Time zone: UTC+1 (CET)
  - Summer (DST): UTC+2 (CEST)
- Postal code: 7451

Oberloisdorf (Croatian: Nadrloštrof, Hungarian: Felsőlászló) is a town in the district of Oberpullendorf in the Austrian state of Burgenland.

== Population ==
Historical population
Year	Pop.	±%
1869	785	—
1880	740	−5.7%
1890	856	+15.7%
1900	895	+4.6%
1910	948	+5.9%
1923	1,036	+9.3%
1934	992	−4.2%
1939	896	−9.7%
1951	884	−1.3%
1961	834	−5.7%
1971	837	+0.4%
1981	757	−9.6%
1991	736	−2.8%
2001	796	+8.2%
2011	780	−2.0%
