= Neapolitan campaigns of Louis the Great =

War between Hungary and Naples, 1347 to 1352

Neapolitan Campaigns
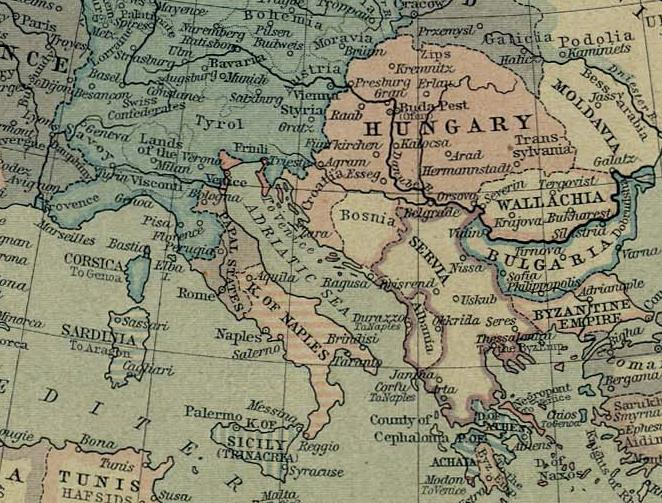
- Kingdom of Naples and Hungary in around 1360
Date	1347 – 1352
Location	Kingdom of Naples, South-Italy
Result	Status quo ante bellum

Belligerents
Kingdom of Hungary; German, Italian and English mercenaries, Hungarian-party Neapolitans, Hungarian knights	Kingdom of Naples; German, Sicilian, Italian, English, Provençal and French mercenaries, French knights

Commanders and leaders
Louis I of Hungary; Stephen Lackfi; Andrew Lackfi; Nicholas Kont; Nicholas Toldi	Louis of Taranto

The Neapolitan campaigns of Louis the Great, also called the Neapolitan Adventure (Nápolyi kaland in Hungarian), was a war between the Kingdom of Hungary, led by Louis the Great, and the Kingdom of Naples. It was fought from 1347 until 1352.

== Preliminaries ==
In 1343 Robert I the Sage, King of Naples, died. His only son, Charles of Calabria, had died in 1328, leaving two daughters, one of whom, Joan, had been married to Andrew, son of king Charles I of Hungary. During his time in Naples, Andrew's more refined wife developed a fierce hostility towards him. After her father's death, she received from the Avignonese Pope Clement VI the official investment of the Kingdom, which was then nominally a vassal of the Papal States. Andrew, who also sought the crown, received only the title of Duke of Calabria.

On June 14, 1345, Clement, after a payment of 44,000 marks, agreed to yield to Andrew the title of king, but only as heir in case of Joan's death. Joan, who was suspected of having an affair with Louis of Taranto, was at the time under the strong influence of the latter's mother, Catherine of Valois. On September 19, the day before the investiture of Andrew as King, a conjure led by Catherine's relatives and courtesans had Andrew assassinated during a hunt at Aversa. Bertramo del Balzo, together with Fra Moriale, from the Hospitallers, discovered and punished the assassins, but suspicion of the queen's involvement in the assassination had already become widespread.

In May 1346, Andrew's brother, King Louis of Hungary, sent envoys to Clement to ask for Joan's deposition. Unsatisfied by the Pope's reply, he mustered an army, planning to embark his troops in Zara. However, at the time the maritime city had rebelled against the Venetians, whose ships were blockading its port. After a failed attempt to free it, the King had to postpone his expedition, while Zara returned under Venice's aegis.

== War ==
In November 1347, Louis set out for Naples with some 1,000 soldiers (Hungarians and Germans), mostly mercenaries. When he reached the border of Joanna's kingdom, he had 2,000 Hungarian knights, 2,000 mercenary heavy cavalry, 2,000 Cuman horse archers, and 6,000 mercenary heavy infantry. He successfully avoided conflict in northern Italy, and his army was well-paid and disciplined. King Louis forbade plundering, and all supplies were bought from locals and paid for with gold. The Hungarian king marched across the land, announcing he was not going to fight any Italian cities or states, and thus was welcomed by most of them. Joanna in the meantime had married her cousin Louis of Taranto and had signed a peace with Naples' traditional enemy, the Kingdom of Sicily. The army of Naples, 2,700 knights and 5,000 infantrymen, was led by Louis of Taranto. At Foligno a papal legate asked Louis to renounce his enterprise, as the assassins had already been punished, and also in consideration of Naples' status as a papal fief. He did not relent, however, and before the end of the year he crossed the Neapolitan border without meeting any resistance.

On January 11, 1348, in the Battle of Capua he defeated the army of Louis of Taranto. Four days later the queen returned to Provence, while her husband followed soon afterwards. All the kingdom's barons swore loyalty to the new ruler as he marched to Naples from Benevento. While visiting Aversa, where his brother had been murdered, Louis had Charles of Durazzo assassinated in revenge by his condottiero Malatesta Ungaro and others. Once in Naples, Louis released most of his mercenaries and their commander, Werner von Urslingen.

Here, Louis and his men were struck by the arrival of the Black Death. He therefore decided to leave the Kingdom of Naples. The Neapolitans, who had quickly grown unhappy with the severe Hungarian rule, called back Joan, who paid for her return expedition (including the services of Urslingen's mercenaries) by selling her rights on Avignon to the popes. She landed near Naples and easily captured it, but the Hungarian commander Ulrich von Wolfurt commanded a strong resistance in Apulia.

When Urslingen deserted back to the Hungarians, she asked the Pope for help. The latter sent a legate who, after offering a great sum to Urslingen and the Wolfurt brothers, brokered a truce. Joanna and Louis would leave the Kingdom to await a new trial on Andrew's assassination, to be held in Avignon. The verdict was Joanna's acquittal from any charge in January 1352, and a peace treaty was signed with Hungary on March 23, 1352.

== Aftermath ==
In 1380 a civil war broke out in the Kingdom, with Joan siding with the Avignonese Pope Clement VII, after which Pope Urban VI offered the throne to Charles III. Louis of Hungary sent money and Hungarian armies in aid of Charles, who was able to enter Naples in 1381. On May 22, 1382, at San Fele, four Hungarian mercenaries strangled the queen
