= Stephen I Lackfi =

Hungarian nobleman and military leader

Stephen (I) Lackfi
- Lord of Simontornya
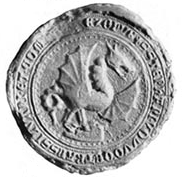
- Seal of Stephen I Lackfi, 1348

Voivode of Transylvania
- Reign: 1344–1350
- Predecessor: Nicholas Sirokai
- Successor: Thomas Gönyűi
- Born: c. 1305
- Died: 1353
- Noble family: House of Lackfi
- Spouses: 1, unidentified (died 1343); 2, Agnes Puchaim (since 1346)
- Issue: (1) Denis II (1) Nicholas II (1) Emeric II (1) Stephen II (2) Ladislaus II (2) Catherine
- Father: Lack Hermán

Stephen (I) Lackfi (Hungarian: Lackfi (I.) István, Croatian: Stjepan I. Lacković; c. 1305 – 1353) was an influential Hungarian nobleman and a successful military leader in the Kingdom of Hungary. He played a significant role in the Neapolitan campaigns of Louis the Great.

== Early life ==
Stephen was the eldest son of Lack, or Ladislaus, of the Hermán kindred, who was Count of the Székelys from 1328, and his first unidentified wife. Stephen was born around 1305. He had seven younger brothers, including his strong ally and military co-leader Andrew, Voivode of Transylvania and Denis I, Archbishop of Kalocsa.

According to Simon of Kéza's Gesta Hunnorum et Hungarorum and the 14th-century Illuminated Chronicle, which was written in the 1350s, when Stephen's political career reached its peak and the Lackfis became the most powerful family in the royal court, the Hermán kindred descended from a knight Herman (Hermán), who originated from Nuremberg and settled down in the Kingdom of Hungary after escorting Gisela of Bavaria in 996, who became the wife of Stephen I of Hungary, the future first King of Hungary.

== Sources ==
- Csukovits, Enikő (2016). "Lackfi István Apuliában [Stephen Lackfi in Apulia]". In Dáné, Veronka; Lupescu-Makó, Mária; Sipos, Gábor (eds.). Testimonio litteratum. Tanulmányok Jakó Zsigmond tiszteletére (in Hungarian). Erdélyi Múzeum Egyesület. pp. 61–68. ISBN 978-606-739-054-4.
- Engel, Pál (1996). Magyarország világi archontológiája, 1301–1457, I. [Secular Archontology of Hungary, 1301–1457, Volume I] (in Hungarian). História, MTA Történettudományi Intézete. ISBN 963-8312-44-0.
- Engel, Pál (2001). The Realm of St Stephen: A History of Medieval Hungary, 895–1526. I.B. Tauris Publishers. ISBN 1-86064-061-3.
- Farkas, Csaba (2018). "Egy udvari katonabáró I. Károly szolgálatában. Lackfi István és az Anjouk Magyarországa [A Royal Court Baron in Arms. Stephen Lackfi's and the Angevin's Hungary]". In Szanka, Brigitta; Szolnoki, Zoltán; Nagy, Zsolt Dezső (eds.). Középkortörténeti tanulmányok 10. A X. Medievisztikai PhD-konferencia (Szeged, 2017. június 7–9.) előadásai (in Hungarian). University of Szeged. pp. 13–33. ISBN 978-963-315-376-5.
- Farkas, Csaba (2021). "Erdély Lackfi István vajdaságának éveiben (1344–1350) [Transylvania under the voivodeship of Stephan Lackfi (1344–1350)]". In Thoroczkay, Gábor (ed.). Középkortörténeti tanulmányok 11. A XI. Medievisztikai PhD-konferencia (Szeged, 2019. május 30–31.) válogatott előadásai (in Hungarian). University of Szeged. pp. 71–88. ISBN 978-615-6194-02-2.
- Kristó, Gyula (1988). Az Anjou-kor háborúi [Wars in the Age of the Angevins] (in Hungarian). Zrínyi Kiadó. ISBN 963-326-905-9.
- Markó, László (2006). A magyar állam főméltóságai Szent Istvántól napjainkig: Életrajzi Lexikon [Great Officers of State in Hungary from King Saint Stephen to Our Days: A Biographical Encyclopedia] (in Hungarian). Helikon Kiadó. ISBN 963-547-085-1.

Stephen I House of Lackfi Born: c. 1305 Died: 1353
Political offices
Preceded by Blaise Fonyi	Master of the horse 1326–1343	Succeeded by Denis Lackfi
Preceded by Thomas Szécsényi	Master of the treasury 1342	Succeeded by Thomas Szécsényi
Preceded by Thomas Szécsényi	Master of the treasury 1343–1344	Succeeded by Lawrence Raholcai
Preceded by Nicholas Sirokai	Voivode of Transylvania; 1344–1350	Succeeded by Thomas Gönyűi
Preceded by Paul Ugali	Ban of Croatia and Slavonia; 1350–1353	Succeeded by Nicholas Hahót
Preceded by Oliver Paksi	Master of the treasury 1353	Succeeded by Cikó Kartal
