= Derencsényi family =

House of Derencsényi
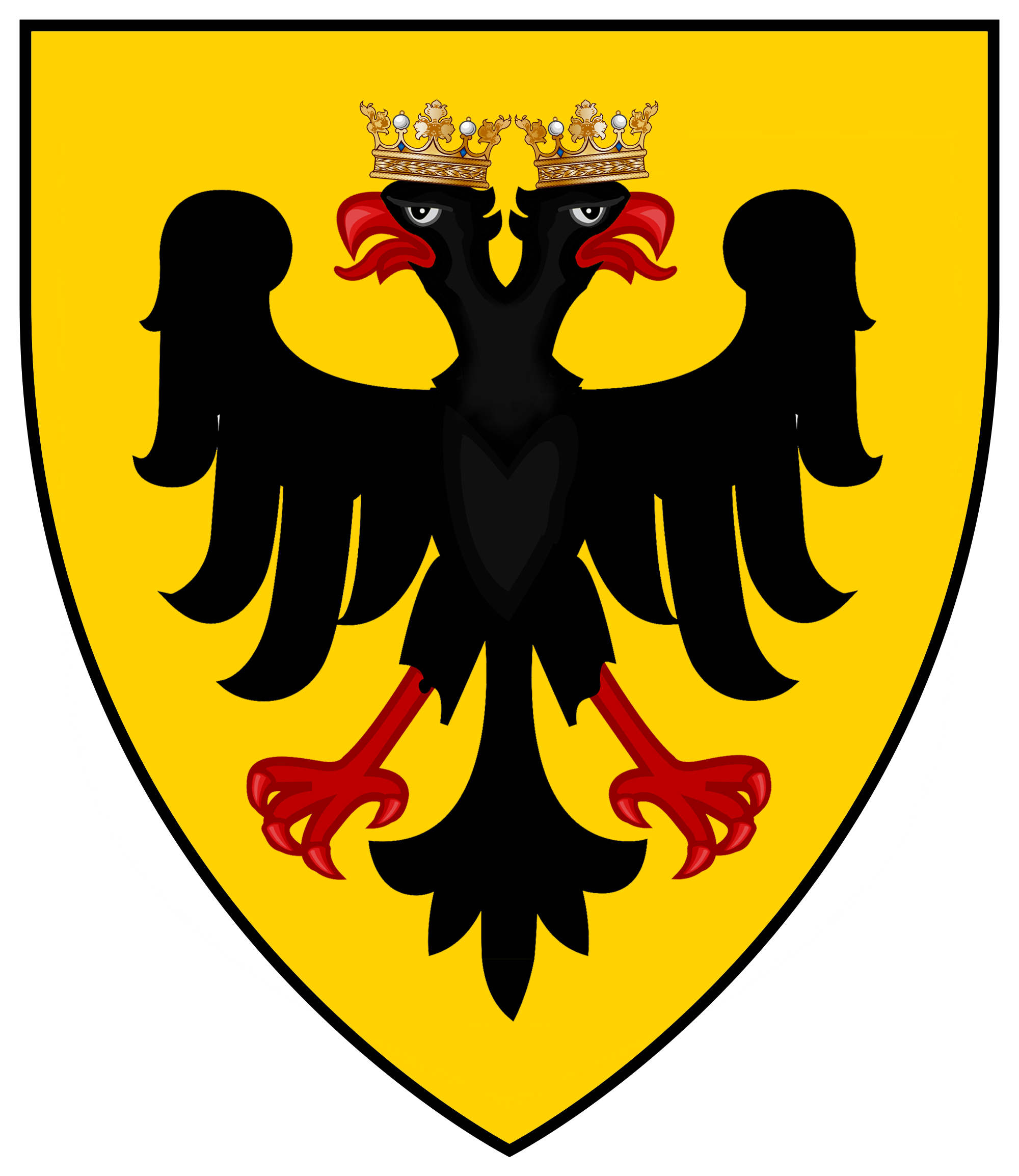
- Parent house: Genus Balog(h)
- Country: Kingdom of Hungary: Kingdom of Croatia
- Founded: 14th century
- Founder: Peter
- Final ruler: Stephen
- Titles: Ban of Croatia
- Dissolution: 16th century

The Derencsényi (Croatian: Derenčin) was a Hungarian noble family from the 14th century to the end of the 16th century.

== Origins ==
The Derencsényi family belonged to the Balog, a clan of Hungarian nobles, which traced its descent to a German knight, Altmann von Friedberg who immigrated into Hungary during the second reign of King Peter (1044–1046).

The first member of the family was Peter Derencsényi ("of Derencsény"), Vice-voivode of Transylvania who obtained the lordship of Derencsény, Gömör County (today: Drienčany, Slovakia). The Derencsényis also possessed Eszterény (today part of Hrušovo) and Laponya.

Paul Derencsényi lost Derencsény and Kápolna because of his tyrannical behavior in 1544. The related House of Szécsi (Széchy) acquired those lands. The last member of the family was Stephen in the end of the 16th century.

== Notable members of the family ==
- Nicholas Derencsényi (c. 1354 – c. 1380): Count of the Székelys (1377–1380)
- Emeric Derencsényi (c. 1394 – c. 1434): Ispán (Count; comes) of Gömör County
- Emeric Derencsényi (? – 11 September 1493): Ban of Croatia and Dalmatia, Ban of Slavonia (1493), killed in the Battle of Krbava Field

== See also ==
- List of titled noble families in the Kingdom of Hungary
