= Lackfi family =

Hungarian-Croatian noble family

House of Lackfi
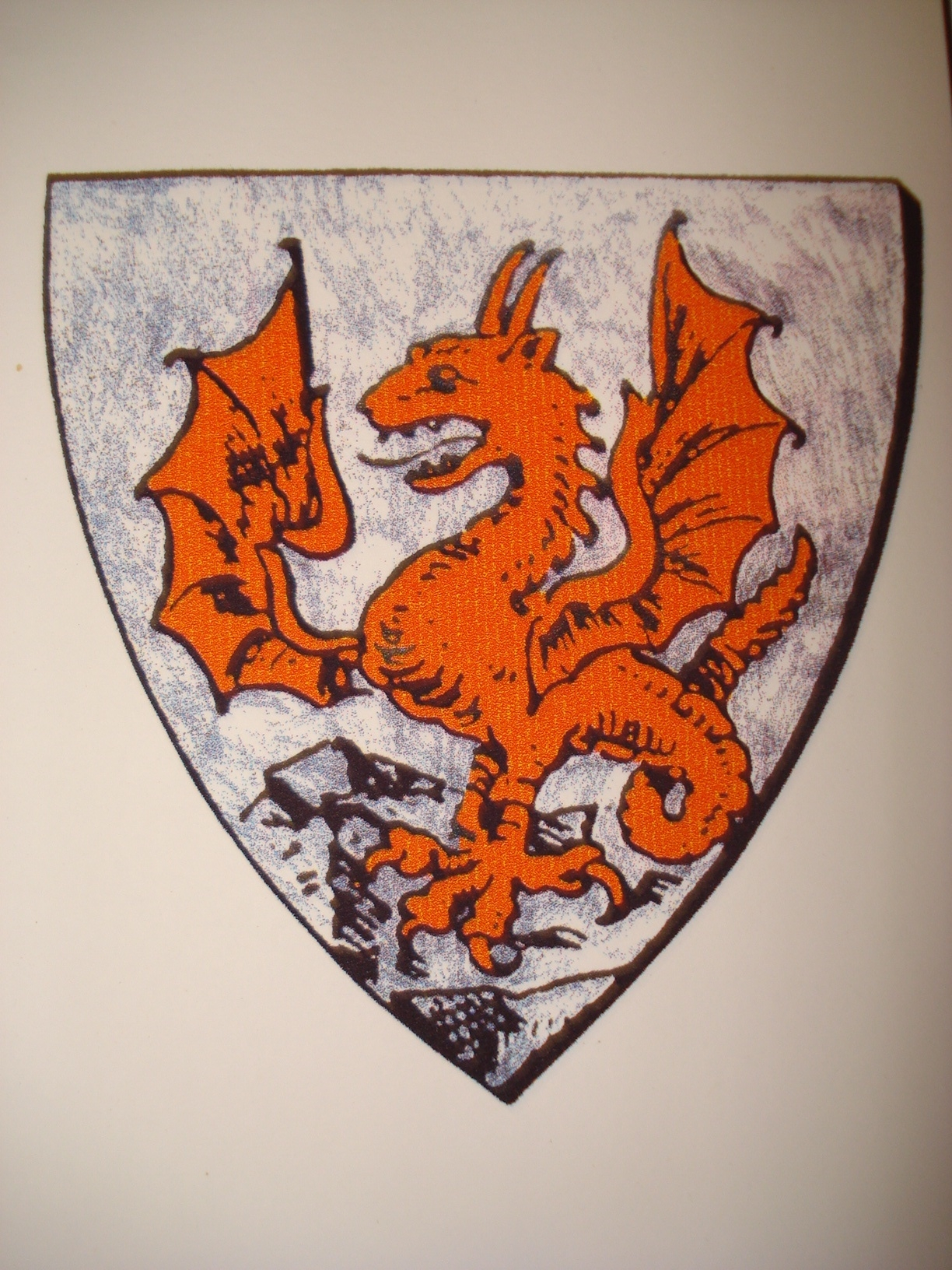
- Parent house: gens Hermán
- Country: Kingdom of Hungary; Kingdom of Croatia
- Founded: 1323
- Founder: Lack of Kerekegyháza
- Final ruler: Michael II
- Titles: Count of the Székelys, Voivode of Transylvania, Ban of Croatia, Palatine of Hungary, etc.
- Dissolution: 1420

The Lackfi, Lacković, Laczkfi, Laczkfy or Laczkovich were a noble family from Kingdom of Hungary and Croatia, which governed parts of Transylvania (as Count of the Székelys) and held the title of Voivode of Transylvania in the 14th century. The Lackfi family were one of the most prestigious families in 14th-century Kingdom of Hungary during the reign of the Capetian House of Anjou. The family also gave several Bans of Croatia (Slavonia and Dalmatia included) and Bulgaria, and held the titles of Palatine of Hungary and Prince of Zadar, Count of San Severino and Serra, as well as a Viceroy to Kingdom of Naples. After Sigismund's accession to the throne and the Bloody Sabor of Križevci (1397), the family lost all of its political influence.

== Origins ==
The family started with Lack, Count of the Székelys of the Herman (Hermány) clan which are thought to have sprung from the Raabs family from Raabs an der Thaya in Lower Austria later Lords of Nuremberg. The theory says they arrived in 995 together with Giselle of Bavaria and settled in the southern area of the Pannonian Basin. His descendants took the name of Lackfi which means son of Lack (Laczk). After having lost most of their influence following the Bloody Sabor of Križevci the remaining branch of the family settled on their Croatian estates in Križevci County.

Earlier it was thought that the family started with Ladislaus Kán as a branch of Kán kindred. The Lack de Szántó family was not related to the Lackfis.

== Members ==
Notable members of the House of Lackfi include:

- Lack, Count of the Székelys (1328–1343).
- Stephen I (Croatian: Stjepan, Hungarian: István), Lord of Međimurje, Voivode of Transylvania (1344–1350), Ban (governor) of Croatia, Slavonia, and Dalmatia (1350–1352).
- Andrew (Croatian: Andrija, Hungarian: András), Voivode of Transylvania (1356–59), Viceroy of Naples (1350–1352).
- Nicholas I (Croatian: Nikola, Hungarian: Miklós), Ban of Slavonia (1342–43), Voivode of Transylvania (1367–1368).
- Denis I (Croatian: Dionizije, Hungarian: Dénes), Bishop of Knin (1348–1349), Bishop of Zagreb (1349–1350), Archbishop of Kalocsa (1350–1356).
- Stephen II (died 1397), Lord of Međimurje, Lendava, Vinica, and Keszthely, Ban of Croatia (1371–1372; 1382–1386), Voivode of Transylvania (1372–1376), Palatine of Hungary (1387–1392), Prince of Zadar (1383, 1387–88, 1391–92).
- Emeric I (Croatian: Mirko, Hungarian: Imre), Voivode of Transylvania (1369–1372), Ban of Bulgaria (1365–1366), Ban of Croatia, Slavonia, and Dalmatia (1368), Prince of Zadar (1368–69).
- Denis II (Croatian: Dionizije, Hungarian: Dénes), Voivode of Transylvania (1359–1367).
- George I (Croatian: Juraj, Hungarian: György), Ban of Mačva/Macsó (1392–1393).

== See also ==
- List of rulers of Croatia
- History of Croatia
- List of feudal lords of Međimurje
- Voivode of Transylvania
