= Alúvium Blhu =

Coordinates: 48.5381°N 20.0444°E

- IUCN category III (natural monument or feature)
- Interactive map of Alúvium Blhu
- Area: 0,0279 km²
- Established: 1991
- Governing body: ŠOP - S-CHKO Cerová vrchovina

Alúvium Blhu is a nature reserve in the Slovak county of Rimavská Sobota in the municipality of Hrušovo. It covers an area of 2,79 ha and has a protection level of 4 under the slovak law. It is part of the Cerová vrchovina Protected Landscape Area

== Description ==
Alúvium Blhu was created for the protection of alder stands. The area is important for scientific research.

== Flora ==
One of the protected plants in the area is the ostrich fern that occurs here in dense concentrations. This fern is a protected and very endangered species in Slovakia
