= Drienčany =

Drienčany Derencsény
- Municipality
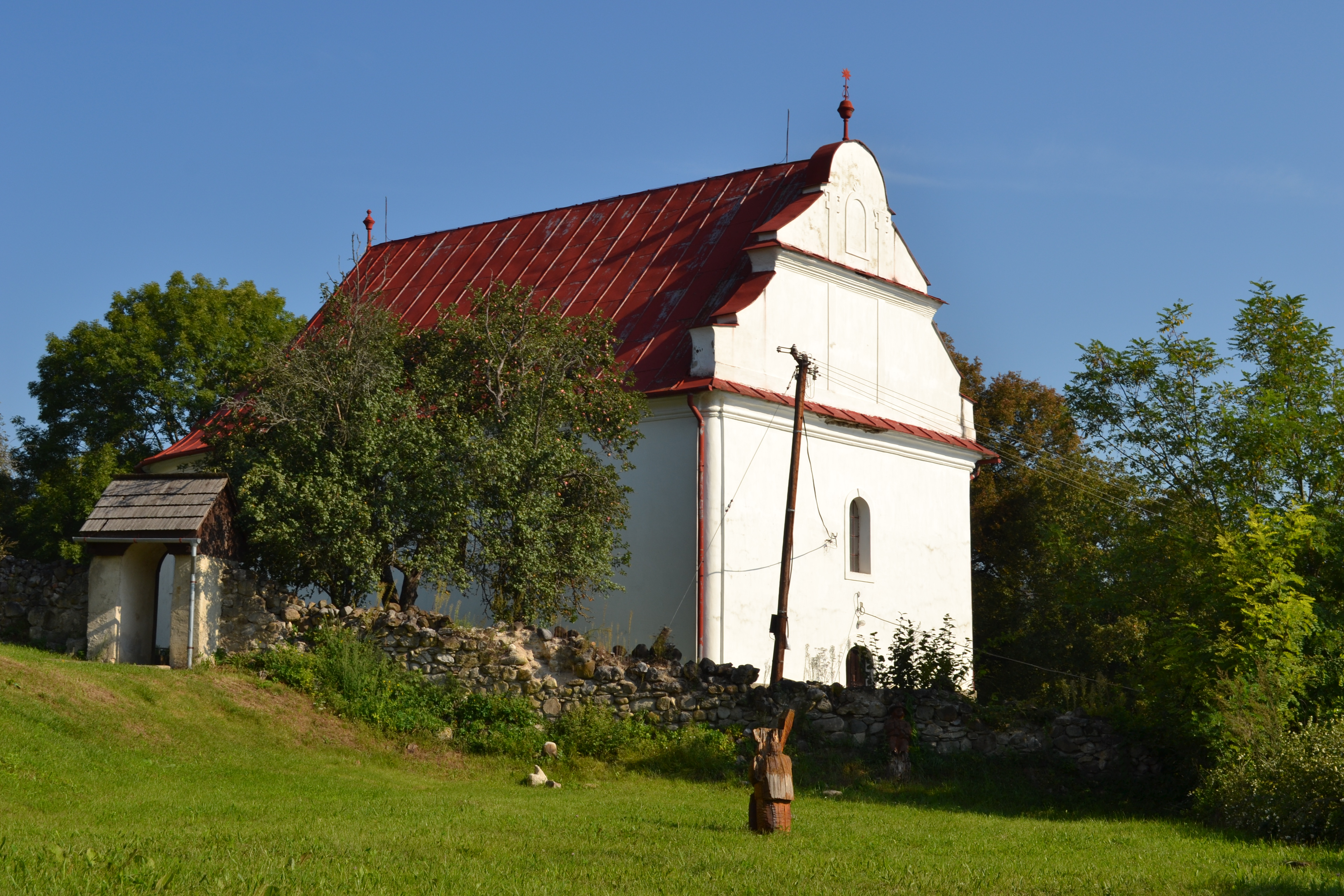
- Protestant church in Drienčany

- Flag

- Location of Drienčany in the Banská Bystrica Region Location of Drienčany in Slovakia
- Coordinates: 48.47°N 20.07°E
- Country: Slovakia
- Region: Banská Bystrica Region
- District: Rimavská Sobota District
- First mentioned: 1291

Area
  - Total: 10.99 km^{2} (4.24 sq mi)
- Elevation: 229 m (751 ft)

Population (2025)
  - Total: 196
- Time zone: UTC+1 (CET)
  - Summer (DST): UTC+2 (CEST)
- Postal code: 980 23
- Area code: +421 47
- Vehicle registration plate (until 2022): RS
- Website: www.driencany.sk

Drienčany (Hungarian: Derencsény) is a village and municipality in the Rimavská Sobota District of the Banská Bystrica Region of southern Slovakia.

== Geography ==
The municipality lies at an altitude of 229 metres (751 ft) and covers an area of 10.99 km^{2} (4.24 sq mi) (2025).

== History ==
In historical records from the Kingdom of Hungary, the village was first mentioned in 1291 (Drenchen) when it was owned by the gens Balog. Later the Hungarian Derencsényi family obtained the lordship. The castle had been built here and it until the end of 17th century. In the 15th century the castle was conquered by John Jiskra. In 16th century Drienčany had been devastated, village became populated in the beginning of 18th century. Inhabitants had been engaged in agriculture, basketry, wax production and livestock breeding.

== Population ==
Population statistic (10 years)
Year	1995	2005	2015	2025
Count	282	245	242	196
Difference		−13.12%	−1.22%	−19.00%

Population statistic
Year	2024	2025
Count	193	196
Difference		+1.55%

It has a population of 196 people (31 December 2025).

=== Ethnicity ===
Census 2021 (1+ %)
Ethnicity	Number	Fraction
Slovak	210	95.45%
Hungarian	11	5%
Romani	6	2.72%
Total	220	

In year 2021 was 220 people by ethnicity 210 as Slovak, 11 as Hungarian, 6 as Romani, 1 as Russian, 1 as Not found out, 1 as Canadian and 1 as Other.

Note on population: The difference values of population numbers in the table "Population statistic" and in the sections "Ethnicity" & "Religion" is caused by the use of various statistical methods.

=== Religion ===
Census 2021 (1+ %)
Religion	Number	Fraction
Evangelical Church	91	41.36%
None	76	34.55%
Roman Catholic Church	35	15.91%
Not found out	15	6.82%
Calvinist Church	3	1.36%
Total	220	

In year 2021 was 220 people by religion 91 from Evangelical Church, 76 from None, 35 from Roman Catholic Church, 15 from Not found out and 3 from Calvinist Church.

== Genealogical resources ==
The records for genealogical research are available at the state archive "Statny Archiv in Banska Bystrica, Slovakia"

- Roman Catholic church records (births/marriages/deaths): 1829-1887 (parish B)
- Lutheran church records (births/marriages/deaths): 1698-1895 (parish A)

== See also ==
- List of municipalities and towns in Slovakia
