= Emeric I Bebek =

Hungarian baron

Emeric (I) Bebek
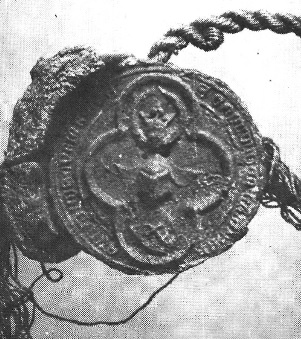
- Seal of Judge royal Emeric Bebek in 1387

Judge royal
- Reign: 1386 & 1386–1392
- Predecessor: John Kaplai
- Successor: John Kaplai
- Died: 1395
- Noble family: House of Bebek
- Issue: Stephen II; Ladislaus II; Andrew; Dominic III; Ursula
- Father: George I Bebek

Emeric (I) Bebek (Hungarian: Bebek (I.) Imre, Croatian: Emerik Bubek; died 1395) was a powerful Hungarian baron, who rose to prominence during the last regnal years of King Louis I of Hungary. After 1382, he was a staunch supporter of Mary, Queen of Hungary. Recognizing Sigismund's accession to the throne, he was made Judge royal, then Voivode of Transylvania. He received numerous land donations, which founded the wealth and influence of his family in the 15th century.

== Early life and career ==
Emeric (I) was born into the Vámos branch of the influential Bebek family, which originated from the ancient Ákos kindred. His father was George, a confidant of Queen Elizabeth of Bosnia, who served as Master of the treasury in her court for decades, from 1360 to 1390. Emeric had two siblings; his brother was Derek, the Palatine of Hungary between 1397 and 1402. He also had an unidentified sister, who married Ladislaus Bánfi de Alsólendva. Emeric had at least five children from his marriage to an unidentified noblewoman. Stephen was mentioned only once in 1397; Andrew functioned as Master of the horse in 1415; Dominic died in 1404; Ursula married Mikcs Mikcsfi, then Juga Racsai. Only Ladislaus had a descendant among Emeric's children: Emeric III, who was also Voivode of Transylvania and was killed in the Battle of Kosovo in 1448.

Both Emeric and Derek appeared first in contemporary records in 1370. Their career began in the Queen's court, where their father George was one of the most influential courtiers. Emeric Bebek served as ispán of Torna County from 1379 to 1380. In this capacity, he also governed the domain of Szádvár Castle and its surrounding areas. King Louis I appointed Bebek as Ban of Croatia and Dalmatia in October 1380. He arrived to Zadar on 19 December, replacing his predecessor Nicholas Szécsi. Bebek was an important confidant of Queen Mary, who ascended the Hungarian throne after her father Louis the Great's death in September 1382, under the guardianship of her strong-willed mother Dowager Queen Elizabeth. In early 1383, still supporting her distant cousin, Mary sent Hungarian royal auxiliary troops to the Kingdom of Naples under the command of Bebek to assist Charles of Durazzo to take the Neapolitan throne against Louis I, Duke of Anjou. Returning home, Queen Mary made Bebek as Voivode of Rus' (the dignity was created after Louis the Great incorporated the occupied territories in Lodomeria, together with Galicia, into the Kingdom of Hungary). Beside that Bebek was also appointed ispán of Sáros and Szepes Counties. He held these offices until late 1385 or mid-January 1386 at the latest.

== Judge royal ==
While Bebek resided in Galicia to govern the province, Charles of Durazzo claimed to the Kingdom of Hungary, after his position in Naples consolidated. Both Elizabeth and Mary remained unpopular among the majority of Hungarian barons who supported Charles against them. Internal war emerged between Charles, the Queens and Sigismund of Luxembourg, the fiancé of Mary, and after Charles marched towards Buda, Mary renounced the crown without resistance and Charles was crowned king of Hungary in Székesfehérvár on 31 December 1385. Charles II tried to reconcile the opposing baronial leagues, as a result several supporters of Mary remained in office. In January 1386, the King appointed Bebek as Judge royal. His person was acceptable to both parties: years ago, he led an army to support Charles in Naples, while he was a loyal bannerman to Mary and Nicholas Garai.

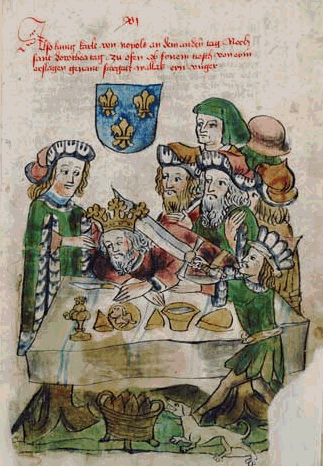
Bebek was present at the assassination of Charles II in February 1386

Even after Charles' coronation, Mary (and Elizabeth), who continued to live in the royal palace in Buda, performed royal duties, thus a dual power emerged in Hungary at the beginning of 1386. Despite being Mary's partisan, Bebek styled himself simply "Judge royal" in his title, without the mention of either Charles or Mary. Historian Iván Bertényi argued the office became independent during the weak central power, and gradually elevated to the status of "Judge of the Country". Through January, Bebek issued royal charters and initiated lawsuits in the name of both Charles and Mary. As Bertényi noted, Bebek represented the unity and indivisibility of the realm in those weeks. But, nevertheless, this proved to be only a temporary political situation. According to medieval chronicles, Emeric Bebek – alongside Ban Nicholas Garai, Bishop Bálint Alsáni, Thomas Szentgyörgyi and his father George Bebek – was present at the assassination of Charles II on 7 February, when Mary's supporter Blaise Forgách attacked and mortally wounded the king. Mary was restored to the throne, with her mother ruling in her name. In the southern territories, the Horvat brothers, John and Paul rose up in open rebellion on behalf of the murdered king's son, Ladislaus of Naples. The queens commissioned Bebek to restore law and order in Slavonia, where the majority of noblemen had supported Charles. He first appeared as Ban of Slavonia in March 1386, while the dignity of Judge royal remained vacant. However, soon, he was re-installed as Judge royal in a few months. Beside that he also governed Bars County until 1388.

In July 1386, the queens decided to visit the southern counties of the kingdom to personally calm the opposition. Accompanied by Garai and a modest following, they were ambushed en route and attacked by the Horvats' soldiers in Gorjani. Garai and Forgách were killed by the rebels and their head were sent to Charles's widow Margaret, while the queens were captured and imprisoned. Under these circumstances, Bebek acknowledged Sigismund's right as consort and swore allegiance to him. During the period of interregnum (from Mary's imprisonment on 25 July 1386 to Sigismund's coronation as co-ruler on 31 March 1387), Bebek again styled himself as "judex curie regie", distinguished his office from the royal authority. Bebek was present, when Sigismund met his wife in Zagreb on 4 July 1387 after her successful rescue from imprisonment. Mary officially remained the co-ruler with Sigismund, but her influence on the government was minimal (while Queen Elizabeth was murdered during captivity).

Bebek was mentioned as ispán of Bereg County from 1388 to 1390, then ispán of Liptó and Turóc Counties from 1390 to 1392, while also served as castellan of Boldogkő. Emeric and Derek Bebek was granted Szokoly Castle (today Sokoľ, Slovakia) and nine villages in Sáros County in 1387. In 1391, Sigismund donated Gönc Castle to the Bebek brothers. All landholdings formerly had belonged to the dominion of provincial lord Amadeus Aba and his clan. Through Bishop Paul Horvat, Ladislaus of Naples's envoys secretly contacted with Bebek on 7 October 1390, beside other barons.

== Later career ==
On 3 March 1392, Bebek was transferred to the position of Voivode of Transylvania (and thus ispán of Szolnok County too). He left Buda for Transylvania by April, first appeared in Kolozsvár (today Cluj-Napoca, Romania), then participated in the Diet of Torda between 6 and 12 May. Following that Bebek returned to the royal court, while the province was administered by his deputy, vice-voivode Bartholomew Szobi. He visited Transylvania again in April 1393, participating in the Diet. Whole summer, he resided in the Fortress of Déva (today in Deva, Romania) since June to prepare the military defense of Transylvania and strengthen its border against the Ottoman Empire, who launched a campaign against Bulgaria and captured Tarnovo.

Sigismund dismissed Bebek as Voivode in September 1393, lost nearly all political influence for the rest of his life. Instead, he was made Master of the treasury for Queen Mary and ispán of Borsod County. He held these dignities until the pregnant Mary's tragic death on 17 May 1395, when the queenly court abolished. Bebek himself also died in that year. Earlier scholarly works incorrectly identified his person with Emeric Bebek, Prior of Vrana and Derek's son, who led the uprising against Sigismund in 1403.

== Sources ==
- Bertényi, Iván (1976). Az országbírói intézmény története a XIV. században [History of the Institution of Judge Royal in the 14th Century] (in Hungarian). Hungarian Academy of Sciences. ISBN 963-05-0734-X.
- Engel, Pál (1996). Magyarország világi archontológiája, 1301–1457, I. [Secular Archontology of Hungary, 1301–1457, Volume I] (in Hungarian). História, MTA Történettudományi Intézete. ISBN 963-8312-44-0.
- Fügedi, Erik (1986). "Könyörülj, bánom, könyörülj ..." ["Have Mercy on Me, My Ban, Have Mercy ..."]. Helikon. ISBN 963-207-662-1.
- Jakó, Zsigmond (1984). "Három erdélyi vajda Zsigmond király korában [Three Voivodes of Transylvania During the Reign of King Sigismund]". In H. Balázs, Éva; Fügedi, Erik; Maksay, Ferenc (eds.). Mályusz Elemér emlékkönyv. Társadalom- és művelődéstörténeti tanulmányok (in Hungarian). Akadémiai Kiadó. pp. 189–207. ISBN 963-05-3272-7.
- Mályusz, Elemér (1984). Zsigmond király uralma Magyarországon, 1387–1437 [The Rule of King Sigismund in Hungary, 1387–1437] (in Hungarian). Gondolat. ISBN 963-281-414-2.
- Markó, László (2006). A magyar állam főméltóságai Szent Istvántól napjainkig: Életrajzi Lexikon [Great Officers of State in Hungary from King Saint Stephen to Our Days: A Biographical Encyclopedia] (in Hungarian). Helikon Kiadó. ISBN 963-208-970-7.

Emeric I House of Bebek Born: ? Died: 1395
Political offices
Preceded by Nicholas Szécsi	Ban of Croatia and Dalmatia; 1380–1383	Succeeded by Stephen Lackfi
Preceded by John Kaplai	Voivode of Rus'; 1383–1385	Succeeded by John Kaplai
Preceded by John Kaplai	Judge royal 1386	Succeeded by Himself
Preceded by Stephen Bánfi & John Bánfi	Ban of Slavonia; 1386	Succeeded by Ákos Mikcsfi
Preceded by Himself	Judge royal 1386–1392	Succeeded by John Kaplai
Preceded by Ladislaus Losonci	Voivode of Transylvania; 1392–1393	Succeeded by Frank Szécsényi
