= Ladislaus I Losonci =

Hungarian baron (died 1392)

Ladislaus (I) Losonci
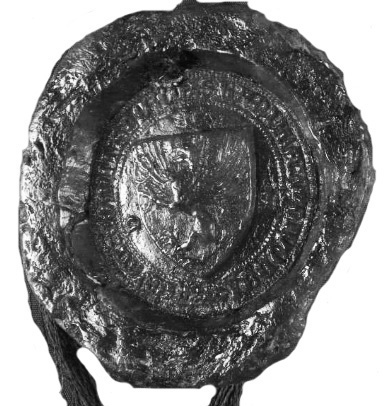
- Seal of Voivode Ladislaus from 1391

Voivode of Transylvania
- Reign: 1376–1385; 1386–1392
- Predecessor: Stephen Lackfi (1st and 2nd term)
- Successor: Stephen Lackfi (1st term); Emeric Bebek (2nd term)
- Died: early 1392
- Noble family: House of Losonci
- Issue: John I
- Father: Desiderius I Losonci

Ladislaus (I) Losonci (Hungarian: Losonci (I.) László; died January–February 1392) was a powerful Hungarian baron, who served as Count of the Székelys from 1373 to 1376, and Voivode of Transylvania from 1376 to 1385 and from 1386 until his death. He was a staunch supporter of Mary, Queen of Hungary after 1382. In contemporary records, he was often called Ladislaus the Elder to distinguish him from his namesake relative Ladislaus II Losonci.

== Early life ==
Ladislaus was born into the Dezsőfi branch of the influential Losonci family as the son of Desiderius I, castellan of Kőszeg then Sebesvár (today Bologa in Poieni, Romania). He had three brothers, Denis, Michael and Nicholas, who also functioned as Count of the Székelys between 1382 and 1385. The Losonci family originated from the Tomaj clan of Pecheneg origin. Ladislaus' great-grandfather was the soldier, Palatine Denis Tomaj, who was killed in the Battle of Mohi in 1241. Ladislaus had a son from his marriage to an unidentified wife; John died childless between around 1399 and 1403.

He first appeared in contemporary sources in 1347. King Louis I made him Count of the Székelys in 1373 (it is possible that he already bore the office since 1371, replacing Stephen Lackfi). In this capacity, according to a royal charter issued by Louis I in March 1373, Losonci committed "official misconduct" when prevented the Saxons of Kronstadt (present-day Brașov, Romania) to use their forests within the border of their privileged seat in Burzenland. He was one of the barons, who countersigned the alliance of treaty between Louis I of Hungary and Charles V of France in December 1374. Losonci held the dignity of count till 1376.

== Voivode of Transylvania ==
Losonci was promoted to Voivode of Transylvania by Louis I in May 1376, again replacing Stephen Lackfi. Beside that he also served as ispán of Szolnok County which belonged to the voivodeship as part of its honor. Losonci governed the province from his seat in Szentivány in Torda County (today Voivodeni, Romania). Both the present-day Romanian and Hungarian names of the village, Voivodeni and Vajdaszentivány, respectively, preserved his central role in the development and history of the settlement. He had his own chancellery there, magister Gál functioned as his protonotarius (chief notary) during most of his term. His vice-voivode was John Temes. In 1377, Louis I visited Transylvania. Alongside Lord Chancellor Demetrius and Ban Nicholas Szécsi, Losonci took part in defining the boundaries of estates across the province, initiated by Louis.

Louis the Great died on 10 September 1382. Demetrius crowned his daughter Mary "king", while Dowager Queen Elizabeth of Bosnia assumed regency. However they remained unpopular among the Hungarian noblemen, the majority of whom regarded Mary's distant cousin, Charles III of Naples, as the lawful king. Three baronial groups and internal anarchic conditions with tensions emerged. Losonci was a staunch supporter of the queens and their strongest ally, Palatine Nicholas Garai. As he opposed Sigismund of Luxembourg's demand to the Hungarian throne and his proposed marriage to Mary, Queen Elizabeth entrusted him to lead a Hungarian delegation to Paris in June 1385 to open negotiations on the marriage of Mary to the younger brother of King Charles VI of France, Louis. Ivan V Frankopan and Ladislaus Losonci arrived to Paris through Padua with 150 knights by the next month, however Sigismund meanwhile invaded Upper Hungary (now Slovakia), forcing the queen mother to give Mary in marriage to him in October, neutralizing Losonci's diplomacy efforts in France. Returning home through Rome, he obtained permission from Pope Urban VI to found an Augustinian monastery near the Parish Church of Szászrégen (today Reghin, Romania).

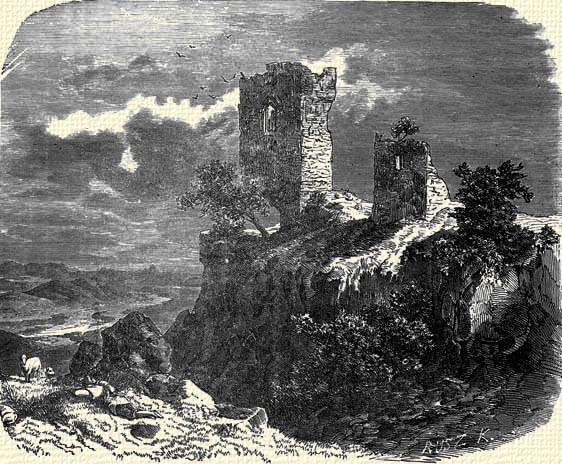
Csicsó Castle, depicted in 1866

Nevertheless Losonci became politically disgraced for a time after his return due to Sigismund's growing influence. In addition, Mary renounced the crown without resistance in December in favour of Charles III of Naples who was elected King of Hungary by the Diet. He was already dismissed as voivode around September, replaced by Stephen Lackfi. After the murdered Charles' supporters captured Mary and her mother on 25 July 1386, Losonci, through the mediation of his relatives from the senior branch, swore allegiance to Sigismund in return for an amnesty letter which guaranteed retention of his possessions and impunity for his previous acts against Sigismund' power interests. Soon thereafter, Losonci was re-installed into the position of voivode by September 1386. He participated in the siege of Novigrad Castle, where Sigismund's troops captured the fort and liberated Mary on 4 June 1387 (her mother Elizabeth was strangled in January). Losonci was present, when Sigismund met his wife in Zagreb on 4 July. Sigismund donated Csicsó Castle (Romanian: Cetatea Ciceu) to Ladislaus and Nicholas Losonci for their merits in the struggle against Charles' supporters. He was also granted Bálványos Castle (today ruins in Unguraș, Romania) around 1387, which remained his family's property until the death of his son John.

However Losonci's loyalty to King Sigismund was merely nominal and forced. Among other native lords, he opposed the permanent presence of foreign consultants and traders in the royal court. Meanwhile, the senior branch of the Losonci family also turned against Sigismund. Ladislaus of Naples's envoys secretly contacted with Ladislaus Losonci on 7 October 1390, beside other barons. Though it is also possible that the Neapolitan charter referred to Ladislaus II Losonci, former Ban of Croatia, in this aspect. Nonetheless, all branches of the Losoncis became supporters of the murdered Charles' son by then. Voivode Losonci and his kinship launched a military campaign from Transylvania to Buda in August 1390, destroying their opponents' possessions on the way. The army reached the area of Szolnok by 20 August, where it plundered the three villages of Frank Szécsényi, a pro-Sigismund baron and brother of Count of the Székelys Simon Szécsényi, a local enemy of the voivode. Their rebellion was crushed by the end of the year as it did not escalated into a civil war at the other regions of the realm. In the following year, Sigismund isolated his rebellious voivode with land donations to local noblemen in Transylvania. The King visited the province in the first half of 1391. At the Diet of Torda, he adopted laws which supported the lesser nobility. For instance, he restricted the powers of the voivode in the re-donation of confiscated landholdings in Transylvania, encouraging Losonci's internal opposition.

Nevertheless, the Voivode suffered illness since May 1391. His deputy John Temes took over daily affairs after that and last appeared in this capacity on 13 January 1392, which confirmed Losonci was still alive then. He died at the end of January or early February. His widow was last mentioned in the summer of 1397. After John's death, Bálványos returned to royal property, while Csicsó was inherited by Nicholas Losonci's sons.

== Sources ==
- Engel, Pál (1996). Magyarország világi archontológiája, 1301–1457, I. [Secular Archontology of Hungary, 1301–1457, Volume I] (in Hungarian). História, MTA Történettudományi Intézete. ISBN 963-8312-44-0.
- Jakó, Zsigmond (1984). "Három erdélyi vajda Zsigmond király korában [Three Voivodes of Transylvania During the Reign of King Sigismund]". In H. Balázs, Éva; Fügedi, Erik; Maksay, Ferenc (eds.). Mályusz Elemér emlékkönyv. Társadalom- és művelődéstörténeti tanulmányok (in Hungarian). Akadémiai Kiadó. pp. 189–207. ISBN 963-05-3272-7.
- Kordé, Zoltán (2019). A székely ispáni méltóság története a kezdetektől 1467-ig [The History of the Dignity of Count of the Székelys from the Beginning to 1467]. Szeged: Szegedi Középkortörténeti Könyvtár. ISBN 978-615-80398-7-1.
- Mályusz, Elemér (1984). Zsigmond király uralma Magyarországon, 1387–1437 [The Rule of King Sigismund in Hungary, 1387–1437] (in Hungarian). Gondolat. ISBN 963-281-414-2.
- Markó, László (2006). A magyar állam főméltóságai Szent Istvántól napjainkig: Életrajzi Lexikon [Great Officers of State in Hungary from King Saint Stephen to Our Days: A Biographical Encyclopedia] (in Hungarian). Helikon Kiadó. ISBN 963-208-970-7.

Ladislaus I House of Losonci Born: ? Died: 1392
Political offices
Preceded by Stephen Lackfi	Count of the Székelys; 1373–1376	Succeeded by Nicholas Derencsényi
Preceded by Stephen Lackfi	Voivode of Transylvania; 1376–1385	Succeeded by Stephen Lackfi
Preceded by Stephen Lackfi	Voivode of Transylvania; 1386–1392	Succeeded by Emeric Bebek
