= Simon Kacsics, Count of the Székelys =

Hungarian lord

Simon Kacsics

Count of the Székelys
- Reign: 1321–1327
- Predecessor: Thomas Losonci
- Successor: Lack Hermán
- Died: after 1327
- Noble family: gens Kacsics
- Issue: Simon; Rado a daughter
- Father: Michael
- Mother: N Balassa

Simon from the kindred Kacsics (Hungarian: Kacsics nembeli Simon; died after 1327) was a Hungarian lord at the turn of the 13th and 14th centuries, who served as Count of the Székelys from 1321 to 1327.

== Family affairs ==
He was born into the Falkos (or Libercse) branch of the ancient gens (clan) Kacsics, as the son of Michael Kacsics (fl. 1271–1301) and an unidentified noblewoman from the so-called "Zólyom kinship", ancestors of the future powerful Balassa family. Simon had three siblings: his two brothers were Thomas the Fat ("Tompos"; fl. 1291–1309) and Peter the Bohemian (fl. 1291–1332), forefathers of the Tompos de Libercse and the Geréb de Vingárt families, respectively. Their unidentified sister married Reynold Kökényesradnót. From his unidentified marriage, Simon had two sons and a daughter: the eldest one Simon became the provost of Dömös (according to Pope John XXII's charter, he earned the office sometimes before November 1325) and court chaplain of Clementia of Hungary. The second son Rado was the ancestor of the Radó de Libercse noble family, which flourished until c. 1422. Simon's only unidentified daughter married Stephen III Losonci.

Simon first appeared in contemporary sources since 1291, alongside his brothers, on the occasion of their father's trial against his brother Farkas over landholding matters, regarding the Szécsény lordship. In addition, the brothers also filed a lawsuit against their mother's family to gain her rightful heritage, the so-called "daughter's quarta" (Latin: quartalitium). As a result, they acquired the villages of Halászi and Galábocs (today Glabušovce, Slovakia) in 1297. The young Simon served as chancellor of the stewards in the court of Queen Fenenna of Kuyavia in October 1295.

== Life and career ==
As almost his whole kinship, Simon served as a familiaris of Matthew Csák, the powerful oligarch, who ruled de facto independently the north-western counties of the kingdom, including Nógrád and Hont counties, where the ancient estates of the Kacsics clan had laid. Only Simon's cousin Thomas supported King Charles I's efforts to defeat the oligarchs, as a result he lost all of his fortune and became penniless, and he could hope the recovery of his lost family landholdings and castles only from a successful restoration of the strong royal power by Charles. On 10 November 1308, Simon was one of the signatories of the treaty of Kékes, when papal legate Gentile Portino da Montefiore persuaded Matthew Csák to accept Charles's rule. After Matthew Csák turned against the monarch in the following year, Simon launched massive attacks against the Diocese of Nyitra in order to expand their influence. Around October 1313, he besieged and captured Nyitra Castle on behalf of Csák, causing serious damage in the walls. He handed over the fort to his lord thereafter. Following that he was appointed castellan of Nyitra, was mentioned in that capacity on 24 June 1317. Subsequently, Simon plundered and looted the surrounding episcopal estates and villages.

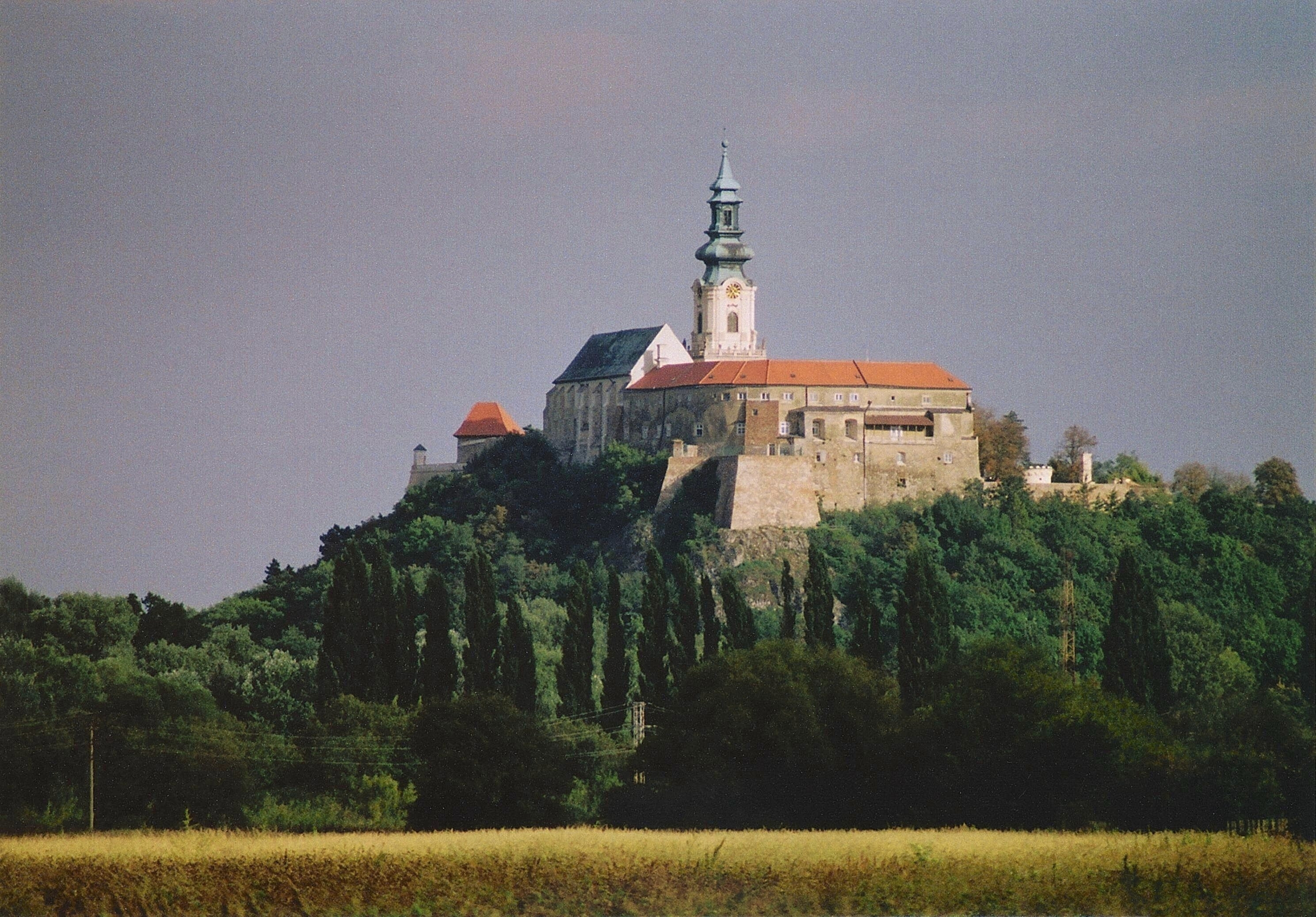
Simon Kacsics besieged and captured Nitra Castle (today in Slovakia) around 1313

However Simon turned on his feudal lord by the following months and joined Charles' partisans, just before the siege of Komárom (today Komárno, Slovakia), when the royal army had captured the fort on 3 November 1317. Simon recognized good sense of pace that the king would sooner or later will overcome the oligarchs, thus he was able to preserve his influence and landholdings successfully, supporting his cousin Thomas Szécsényi's growing power. Soon, they were jointly sent to the Kingdom of Bohemia as representants of Charles, in addition to an interpreter Stephen Sáfár, in order to find a bride for the king (whose wife Maria of Bytom had died in December 1317). There they chose Beatrice of Luxembourg. Despite his oath of loyalty to Charles, John III, Bishop of Nyitra, who had been earlier impaired and expelled by Matthew Csák's violent actions, excommunicated the oligarch's five former familiares, including Simon, on 3 March 1318. The prelate recalled that after the seizure of Nyitra Castle and destroying several episcopal villages, Simon loudly abused and intended to stab John with a sword in the presence of Matthew Csák, but the powerful oligarch prevented him by his admonition. Thereafter, Simon blasphemed the bishop. According to another document from that period, Matthew Csák plundered Simon's nearby villages and lands, as a revenge for his betrayal.

After Thomas Szécsényi was granted large-scale domains in Transylvania, his cousin's career gradually also drifted to the eastern province of the kingdom. In the spring of 1319, Simon was made ispán of Krassó County and castellan (with the title ispán) of the Mezősomlyó royal household (today near Șemlacu Mare, Romania). He held both dignities until 15 September 1325. After his appointment, Simon took part in the royal campaign against the rebellious lord Mojs Ákos at the end of the year. Thus he received land donations in Transylvania. Since 1320, he was also mentioned as head of the Saxon districts of Mediasch and Bistritz (now Mediaș and Bistrița in Romania). Thomas Szécsényi was appointed Voivode of Transylvania in July 1321, and was entrusted with the task of suppression of the revolt of the late Ladislaus Kán's sons. In the same time, Simon elevated to the position of Count of the Székelys, to strengthen his cousin's efforts to restore order in the province. Since then, the counts of Székelys were almost continuously also the rulers of the Saxons of Bistritz, lasted until 1453. About three months later, Szécsényi (possibly with the assistance of Simon) seized Csicsó (present-day Ciceu-Corabia in Romania), the last fortress of the Kán kindred. On 20 April 1322, Voivode Thomas Szécsényi, Count Simon Kacsics and Bishop Andrew Szécsi jointly convened a general assembly to Keresztes (today a borough in Turda, Romania), demonstrating the province's successful consolidation. In May, Simon also inherited the estates of his brother-in-law Reynold Kökényesradnót, who was dead by then. His brother Peter was granted the land of Ölyves in the same time.

Simon last appeared as Count of the Székelys on 4 June 1327, when he was a member of an ad litem court led by Judge royal Alexander Köcski, which made a judgment on a case of ownership of Alvinc (today Vințu de Jos, Romania) in favour of the Esztergom Chapter against the Székelys of Aranyos Seat. However, soon, Simon's career turned into downfall: as a royal diploma from 9 October 1338 narrates, he was dismissed (in 1327 or 1328) from his dignity, because he had committed "serious crimes" and his confiscated land of Róna was granted by Szécsényi. After 4 June 1327, Simon Kacsics disappeared from sources, his fate is unknown. He was succeeded by Lack Hermán as Count of the Székelys by 21 September 1328.

== Sources ==
- Engel, Pál (1988). "Az ország újraegyesítése. I. Károly küzdelmei az oligarchák ellen (1310–1323) [Reunification of the Realm. The Struggles of Charles I Against the Oligarchs (1310–1323)]". Századok (in Hungarian). 122 (1–2). Magyar Történelmi Társulat: 89–146. ISSN 0039-8098.
- Engel, Pál (1996). Magyarország világi archontológiája, 1301–1457, I. [Secular Archontology of Hungary, 1301–1457, Volume I] (in Hungarian). História, MTA Történettudományi Intézete. ISBN 963-8312-44-0.
- Kádár, Tamás (2017). "(III.) János nyitrai püspök (1302–1328) életútja [The Profession of John (III) Bishop of Nyitra (1302–1328)]". Magyar Egyháztörténeti Vázlatok (in Hungarian). 29 (1–2): 5–21. ISSN 0865-5227.
- Karácsonyi, János (1901). A magyar nemzetségek a XIV. század közepéig. II. kötet [The Hungarian genera until the middle of the 14th century, Vol. 2] (in Hungarian). Hungarian Academy of Sciences.
- Kordé, Zoltán (1999). "Károly Róbert székely ispánjai: adalékok az I. Károly alatti arisztokrácia történetéhez [The Count of the Székelys of Charles Robert: Data to the History of Aristocracy During the Reign of Charles I]". In Makk, Ferenc; Piti, Ferenc (eds.). Acta Universitatis Szegediensis. Acta Historica (in Hungarian). MTA-SZTE-MOL Magyar Medievisztikai Kutatócsoport. pp. 21–31. ISSN 0324-6965.
- Kordé, Zoltán (2016). "Közigazgatás [Administration]; Katonáskodó székelyek az írott forrásokban [Székely soldiers in the written sources]". In Benkő, Elek; Oborni, Teréz (eds.). Székelyföld története, I. kötet: A kezdetektől 1562-ig (in Hungarian). Magyar Tudományos Akadémia Bölcsészettudományi Kutatóközpont, Erdélyi Múzeum-Egyesület, Haáz Rezső Múzeum. pp. 168–180, 305–320. ISBN 978-606-739-040-7.
- Zsoldos, Attila (2011). Magyarország világi archontológiája, 1000–1301 [Secular Archontology of Hungary, 1000–1301] (in Hungarian). História, MTA Történettudományi Intézete. ISBN 978-963-9627-38-3.

Simon Genus Kacsics Born: ? Died: after 1327
Political offices
Preceded by Thomas Losonci	Count of the Székelys; 1321–1327	Succeeded by Lack Hermán
