= Lack Hermán =

Hungarian nobleman

Count of the Székelys
- Reign: 1328–1343
- Predecessor: Simon Kacsics
- Successor: Andrew Lackfi
- Born: 1280s
- Died: 1359
- Noble family: gens Hermán
- Spouses: 1, unidentified 2, Margaret Pósafi
- Issue: Stephen I Lackfi; Andrew I Lackfi; Nicholas I Lackfi; Denis I Lackfi; Michael I Lackfi; Ladislaus I Lackfi; Paul Lackfi; Emeric I Lackfi; Maria Lackfi
- Father: Denis

Lack from the kindred Hermán (Hungarian: Hermán nembeli Lack), also known as Lack of Kerekegyháza (Hungarian: Kerekegyházi Lack; died 1359) was an influential Hungarian nobleman, who served as Count of the Székelys from 1328 to 1343. He was the eponymous ancestor of the powerful and rich Lackfi family.

== Ancestry and early life ==
Lack (or Ladislaus) was born into the gens (clan) Hermán as the son of Denis, whose ancestors are unknown, as a result there is inability to connect the Lackfi branch to the other branches of the clan. According to Simon Kézai's Gesta Hunnorum et Hungarorum, the ancestor of the kindred, knight Herman originated from Nuremberg, who escorted Gisela of Bavaria in 996, who became the wife of Stephen I of Hungary, the future first King of Hungary. Following that Herman received land donations in Vas County. Both magister Simon and the 14th-century Illuminated Chronicle described the Hermán kindred as "relatively poor". It is possible that Rubinus, a late-13th-century talented military leader was a direct or close ancestor of Lack (e.g. grandfather), as he was the first known member of his genus, who operated in Transylvania. As his elder sons, Stephen I and Andrew I already appeared as office-bearers and active soldiers in the contemporary records since the 1320s, Lack presumably was born in the 1280s, thus his career began to rise when he was already relatively old. His degree of kinship to contemporary relative Lampert Hermán, who served as Judge royal from 1314 to 1324, is unknown. Lampert also possessed extensive lands in Transylvania.

Lack first appeared in a contemporary royal charter in 1323, when he was already among the barons, who confirmed the peace treaty between Charles I of Hungary and Frederick the Fair with their seals. It is plausible that Lack participated in the royal campaigns against the territory of the sons of the late powerful lord Ladislaus Kán since 1316. Following the war, Lack was granted dozen landholdings in Arad, Hunyad, Csanád counties, laid surrounding the temporary royal seat Temesvár (present-day Timișoara in Romania). Beside that he also owned inherited lands and villages in the region, proved by a division contract of the lands with his cousins in 1329. Thus, it is plausible, Lack, as a relatively insignificant local noble, whose kindred had estates mainly in Arad County, including Kerekegyháza, became an ardent and active member of the royal council, when King Charles I of Hungary moved his residence from Buda to Temesvár in 1315 and resided there until 1323. However there is no record of any military activity of Lack during the unification war, which characterized the following decade. After his successful struggle against the oligarchs to restore royal power, Charles I established a new aristocracy which had supported his efforts and depended on the strength of the royal authority. By 1323, Charles had taken "full possession" of his kingdom, and transferred his residence from Temesvár to Visegrád in that year.

== Career ==
After his predecessor, Simon Kacsics was dismissed in 1327 or 1328, because he had committed "serious crimes", according to a contemporaneous royal charter, Lack Hermán was appointed Count of the Székelys. He first appeared in this status with his seal ("Ladizlaus comes Syculorum") at the diploma of Charles on 21 September 1328, when the Hungarian monarch signed a peace treaty with the three dukes of Austria (Frederick the Fair, Albert the Lame, and Otto the Merry), who renounced Pressburg (now Bratislava in Slovakia) and the Muraköz (now Međimurje in Croatia). His son, Stephen Lackfi, who then held the dignity of Master of the horse ("Stephanus magister agasonum"), was also among the signatories. It is possible that Lack also fought in the war that preceded the treaty. Lack and his son, Stephen were among those appointed noble judges in May 1330, who has ruled over the kindred Záh, which one of notable members, Felician Záh had attempted to assassinate the royal family on 17 April 1330 in Visegrád. Lack participated in Charles' disastrous Wallachian campaign of 1330, when Basarab I defeated the Hungarian army in the Battle of Posada. On his way return to home across the Carpathian Mountains, Lack seized and occupied the Péterfalvai family's estates in Transylvania. Beside the form "Count of the Székelys", Lack was also styled as "count of the three clans of the Székelys"; but the exact meaning of the title is unknown. It is possible that referred to the three emerging social classes of the Székely population. Frequently he was also mentioned as the "judge of the Székelys" since the 1330s, evidencing that the counts had acquired significant judicial authority by that time. In addition, Lack styled himself the commander (captain) of the royal army stationed between the rivers Rába and Rábca during a campaign against Austria in 1336. Lack frequently resided in the royal court at Visegrád since the early 1330s, thus he exercised his duties and managed its accessory properties via his deputies. In the last regnal years of Charles I, Lack was likely also commissioned to protect the eastern border against the contiguous raiding troops of the Golden Horde.

During his term as count, Lack maintained a good relationship with Thomas Szécsényi, the Voivode of Transylvania since 1321. This cooperation was temporarily overshadowed by a personal tragedy in early 1335, when Lack's son Emeric was murdered by three familiares of Szécsényi at the royal camp during Charles' campaign against Serbia. As a compensation, the voivode handed over the village of Kuglófalva (later Kutyfalva, present-day Cuci, Romania) to Lack and his sons. Some years later, in 1339, Lack donated the village to the cathedral chapter of Várad (today Oradea Mare) for the spiritual salvation of Emeric. After the death of Charles I in 1342, Szécsényi's excessive political ambitions were confronted with the interests of Lack and mainly his more influential sons.

Beside his baronial dignity, Lack also served as ispán of Medgyes (or Mediasch, now Mediaș in Romania). That Saxon district was subject to the counts of Székelys until Sigismund of Luxemburg, King of Hungary, exempted the local inhabitants from the counts' authority in 1402. From 1334 to 1339, Lack governed the Saxons of Bistritz (present-day Bistrița in Romania) too. He was also referred to as ispán of Csanád County in a document of 1339. As his direct predecessor Nicholas Telegdi was mentioned in this capacity only in 1326, it is possible Lack acquired the position much long before. Lack was last mentioned as Count of the Székelys on 2 May 1343. Thereafter, the office was almost continuously held by his descendants, the Lackfis for about 50 years.

== Family and retirement ==
Lack had eight sons from his first unidentified wife: Stephen I and Andrew I were successful barons and military leaders, who established the family wealth. Nicholas I, Paul, who held ispánates too, and Michael I also participated in King Louis the Great's royal campaigns, supporting their elder brothers. Denis I joined the Franciscans and later elevated to the position of Archbishop of Kalocsa. Ladislaus I (or Lack) died early, while Emeric I was murdered by Thomas Csapi from the Baksa kindred and two other noblemen during a 1334–1335 campaign against Serbia. They were all referred to as "Lackfi" (lit. "son of Lack") in the subsequent decades. Lack's first wife was still alive in 1342. It is possible that they had also an unnamed daughter, the wife of Nicholas Hencfi, rector of Buda.

Lack voluntarily went into the background in favor of his sons, especially Stephen and Andrew since the 1330s, according to historian Csaba Farkas. In May 1342, as a sign of conscious retirement, Lack and his wife have handed over their heritage to their five surviving layman sons (i.e. excluding the clergyman Denis), who shared the possessions among themselves in a contract. Lack established his residence in Kerekegyháza in Arad County, where he spent much of his remaining life. His first wife died around 1344 or 1345. After his retirement, Lack appeared as an arbiter at the royal court during a lawsuit only one occasion in February 1346. At the age of seventies, Lack, who had been widowed by that time, married for the second time to Margaret Pósafi de Szer, the widow of Pető Szántai, around 1355. They had no children. Lack lived a long time and witnessed the rise of his sons during the reign of Louis I, when eight members of the family held high offices. The Lackfis became the most illustrious and influential noble house in the Angevin age. Five of his sons predeceased him. Lack died around September 1359, when some of his grandsons already entered political and court service.

== Sources ==
- Engel, Pál (1996). Magyarország világi archontológiája, 1301–1457, I. [Secular Archontology of Hungary, 1301–1457, Volume I] (in Hungarian). História, MTA Történettudományi Intézete. ISBN 963-8312-44-0.
- Farkas, Csaba (2019). "Az elfeledett sárkány: Hermány nembeli Lack (1328–1359) [The Forgotten Dragon: Lack from the Kindred Hermány (1328–1359)]". Fons (in Hungarian). 26 (2). Szentpétery Imre Történettudományi Alapítvány: 193–230. ISSN 1217-8020.
- Karácsonyi, János (1901). A magyar nemzetségek a XIV. század közepéig. II. kötet [The Hungarian genera until the middle of the 14th century, Vol. 2] (in Hungarian). Hungarian Academy of Sciences.
- Kordé, Zoltán (1999). "Károly Róbert székely ispánjai: adalékok az I. Károly alatti arisztokrácia történetéhez [The Count of the Székelys of Charles Robert: Data to the History of Aristocracy During the Reign of Charles I]". In Makk, Ferenc; Piti, Ferenc (eds.). Acta Universitatis Szegediensis. Acta Historica (in Hungarian). MTA-SZTE-MOL Magyar Medievisztikai Kutatócsoport. pp. 21–31.
- Kordé, Zoltán (2016). "Közigazgatás [Administration]; Katonáskodó székelyek az írott forrásokban [Székely soldiers in the written sources]". In Benkő, Elek; Oborni, Teréz (eds.). Székelyföld története, I. kötet: A kezdetektől 1562-ig (in Hungarian). Magyar Tudományos Akadémia Bölcsészettudományi Kutatóközpont, Erdélyi Múzeum-Egyesület, Haáz Rezső Múzeum. pp. 168–180, 305–320. ISBN 978-606-739-040-7.

Lack Genus Hermán Born: ? Died: 1359
Political offices
Preceded by Simon Kacsics	Count of the Székelys; 1328–1343	Succeeded by Andrew Lackfi
