= Castle of Simontornya =

Medieval Hungarian castle

Coordinates: 46°45′10″N 18°33′09″E

The Castle of Simontornya is a 13th-century Renaissance castle in Simontornya, Hungary. The castle went through several modifications and was owned by a succession of different noble families. It was the scene of several battles, including most notably, Rákóczi's War of Independence and was eventually upgraded into a fortress in the early 18th century and ended up being used as a barn. The name Simontornya means Simon's Tower.

== History ==
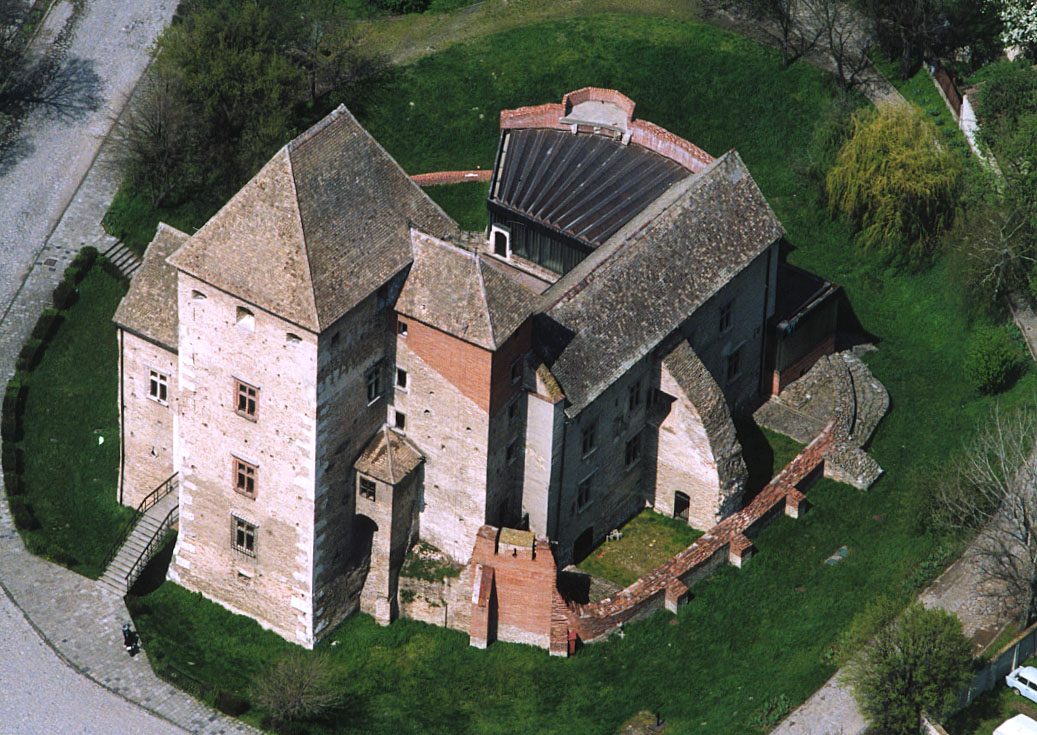
The Castle of Simontornya

The tower was built in the 13th century by Simon (Son of Salamon) among the swamps of the Sió river. Nearly all owners of the castle made some alterations throughout the centuries. The Lackfi Family built a new gothic wing in the 14th century, altered the old tower, and added an arcaded loggia to the back-front. After the extinction of the House of Garai in 1482, the castle again belonged to Queen Beatrice, wife of Matthias Corvinus. In 1536, the castle became the property of the chief court master Gergely Pöstyéni, who received it from King John Zápolya as a reward. He would be the final Hungarian to own the castle before its capture by the Ottoman Empire.

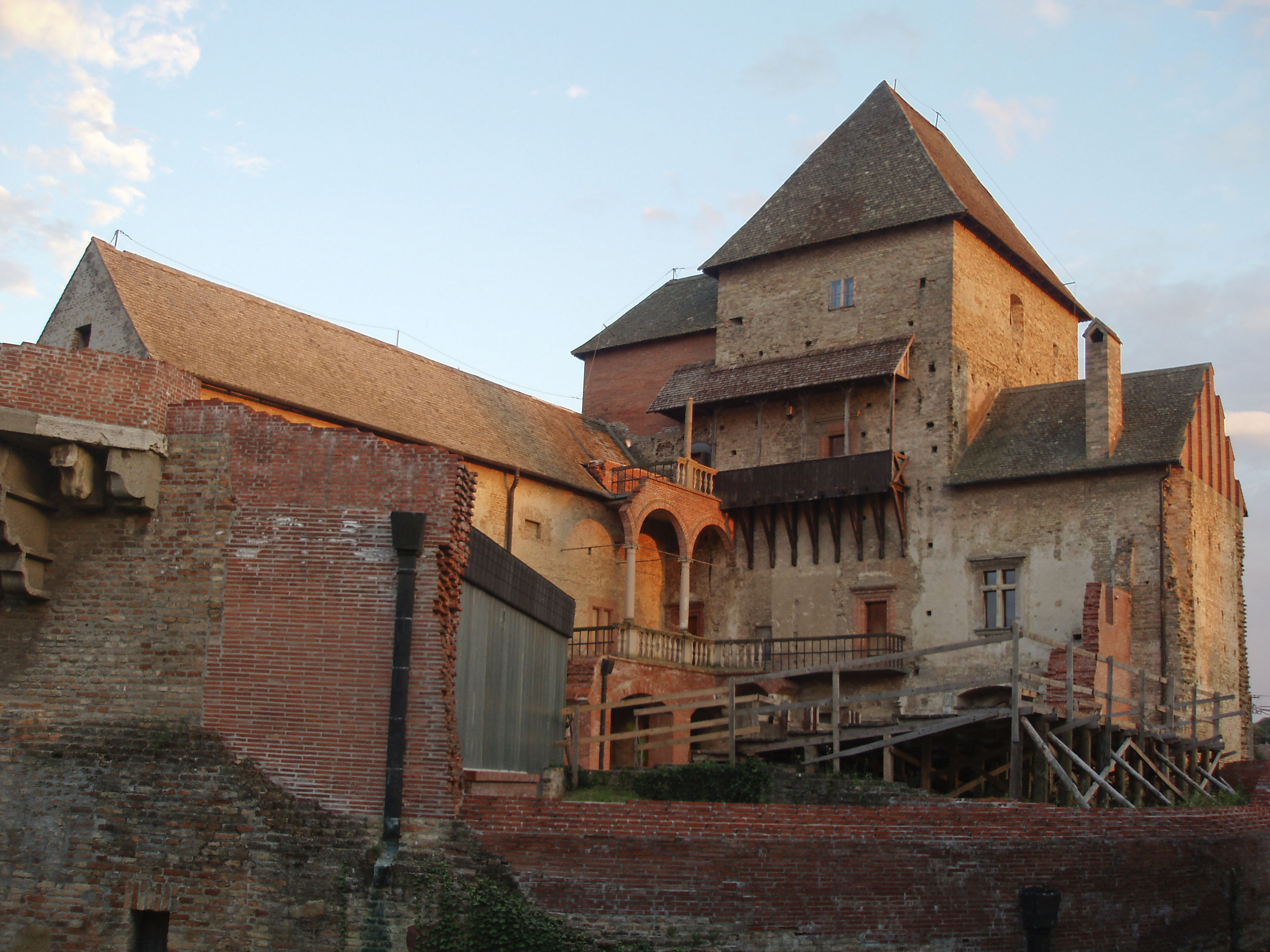
Castle of Simontornya from the North side

Mózes Buzlay, Marshall of King Ulászló II (1456–1516), improved the castle into a renaissance palace with the help of Italian masters and craftsmen from Buda. After his death the castle was taken over by the Ottoman army in 1543. This event marked the beginning of a new era with an emphasis on military requirements. During the nearly 150 years of occupation, minor alterations and refinements were constantly being made. Although Simontornya did not front the main road leading to the Danube, it was close enough to the strongholds of Veszprém and Várpalota, which at the time were held by the Kingdom of Hungary, which resulted in an increased military presence.

Simontornya, the center of an Ottoman-era sandjak was recaptured by Louis William, Margrave of Baden-Baden in 1686. In just two years (1702–1704) major alterations turned the castle into a fortress. During the revolution against the Habsburgs, led by Prince Francis II Rákóczi, Simontornya became the stronghold of the Kuruc rebels in southwest Hungary. The fortress was captured by the Austrian army in 1709, which it then housed to troops until 1717.

The castle fortress was later donated to the House of Limburg-Stirum, but, after building a new castle, they turned the old one into a barn. It has been used as a barn by all new owners until 1960, when archeological excavations started.
