= Simontornya =

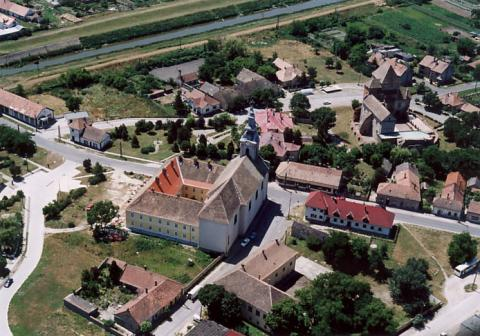
- Aerial view

- Flag Coat of arms

- Location of Tolna county in Hungary

- Location of Simontornya
- Coordinates: 46.75408°N 18.54754°E
- Country: Hungary
- County: Tolna

Area
  - Total: 33.83 km^{2} (13.06 sq mi)

Population (2015)
  - Total: 4,051
  - Density: 119.7/km^{2} (310.1/sq mi)
- Time zone: UTC+1 (CET)
  - Summer (DST): UTC+2 (CEST)
- Postal code: 7081
- Area code: 74

Simontornya is a town in Tolna County, Hungary.

Pictures of the town

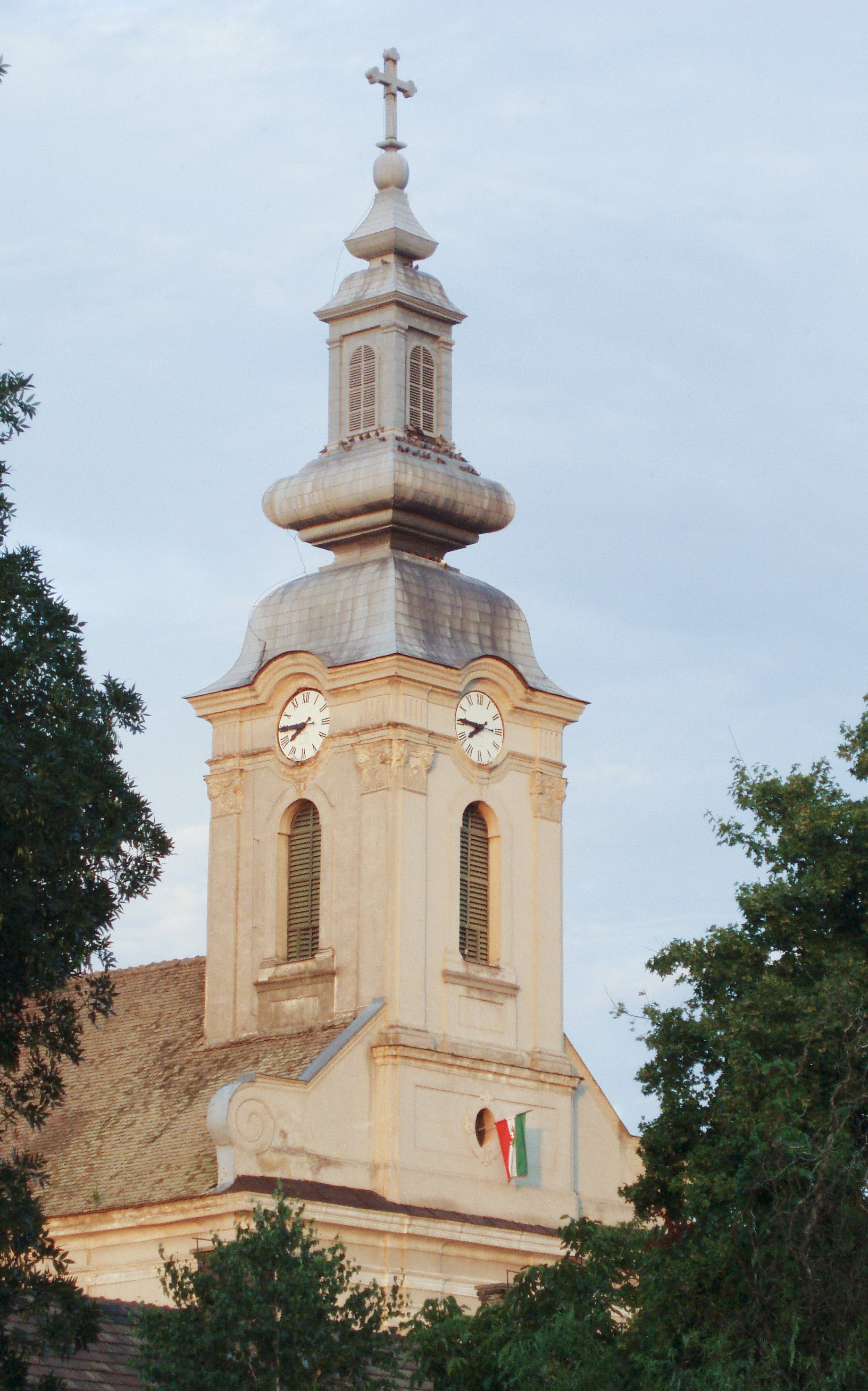
Simon's Tower at the center of town

== See also ==
- Simontornya Castle
