= Nicholas Derencsényi =

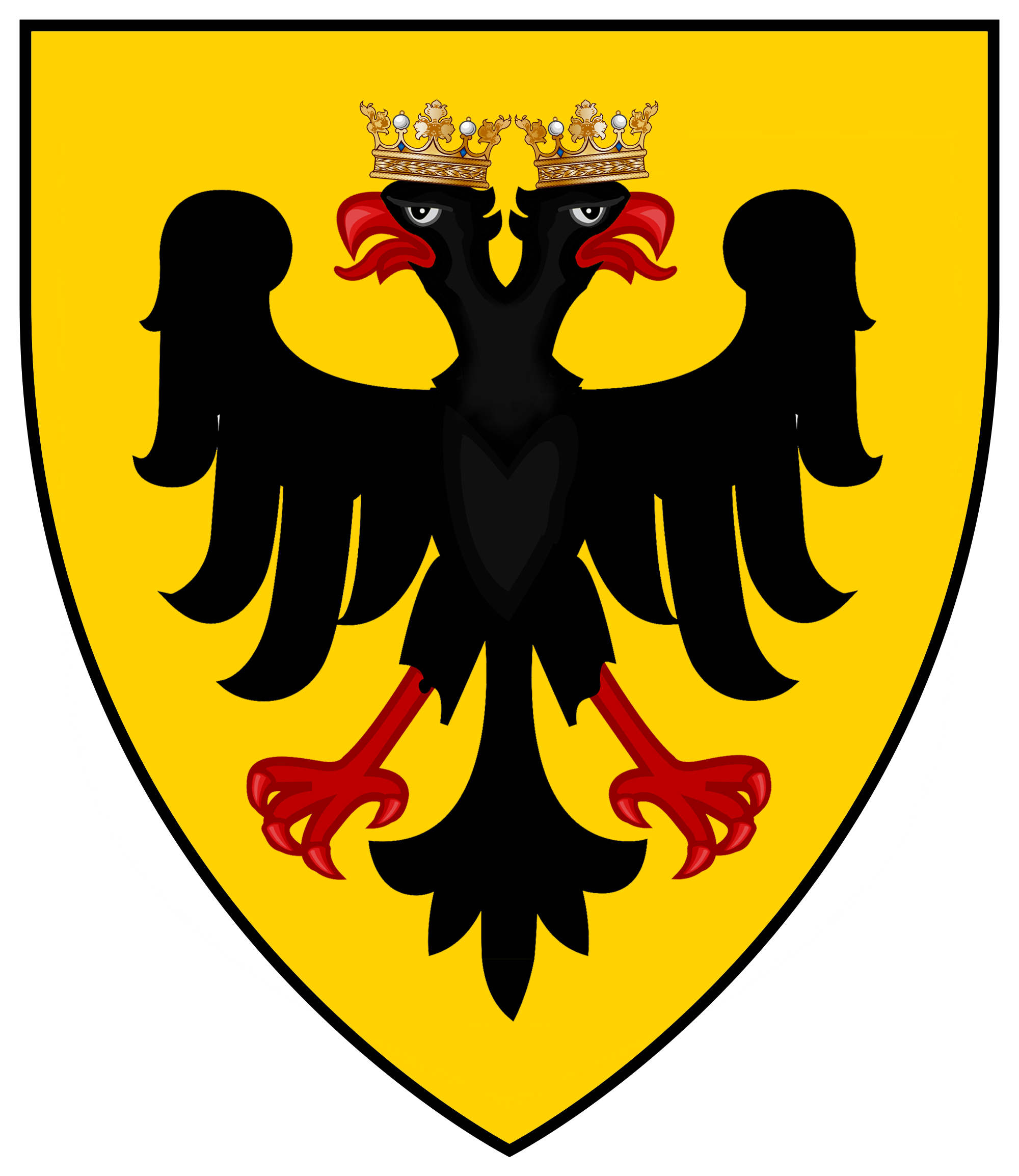

Nicholas Derencsényi (Hungarian: Derencsényi Miklós) was a Hungarian nobleman from the House of Derencsényi, who served as Count of the Székelys (Hungarian: székelyispán, Latin: comes Sicolorum) from 1377 to 1380.

== Sources ==
- Engel, Pál (1996). Magyarország világi archontológiája, 1301–1457, I. ("Secular Archontology of the Kingdom of Hungary, 1301–1457, Volume I."). História, MTA Történettudományi Intézete. Budapest. ISBN 963-8312-44-0.

Political offices
Preceded by Ladislaus Losonci	Count of the Székelys; 1377–1380	Succeeded by Nicholas Perényi
