= Bloody Sabor of Križevci =

1397 massacre of political rivals in Croatia

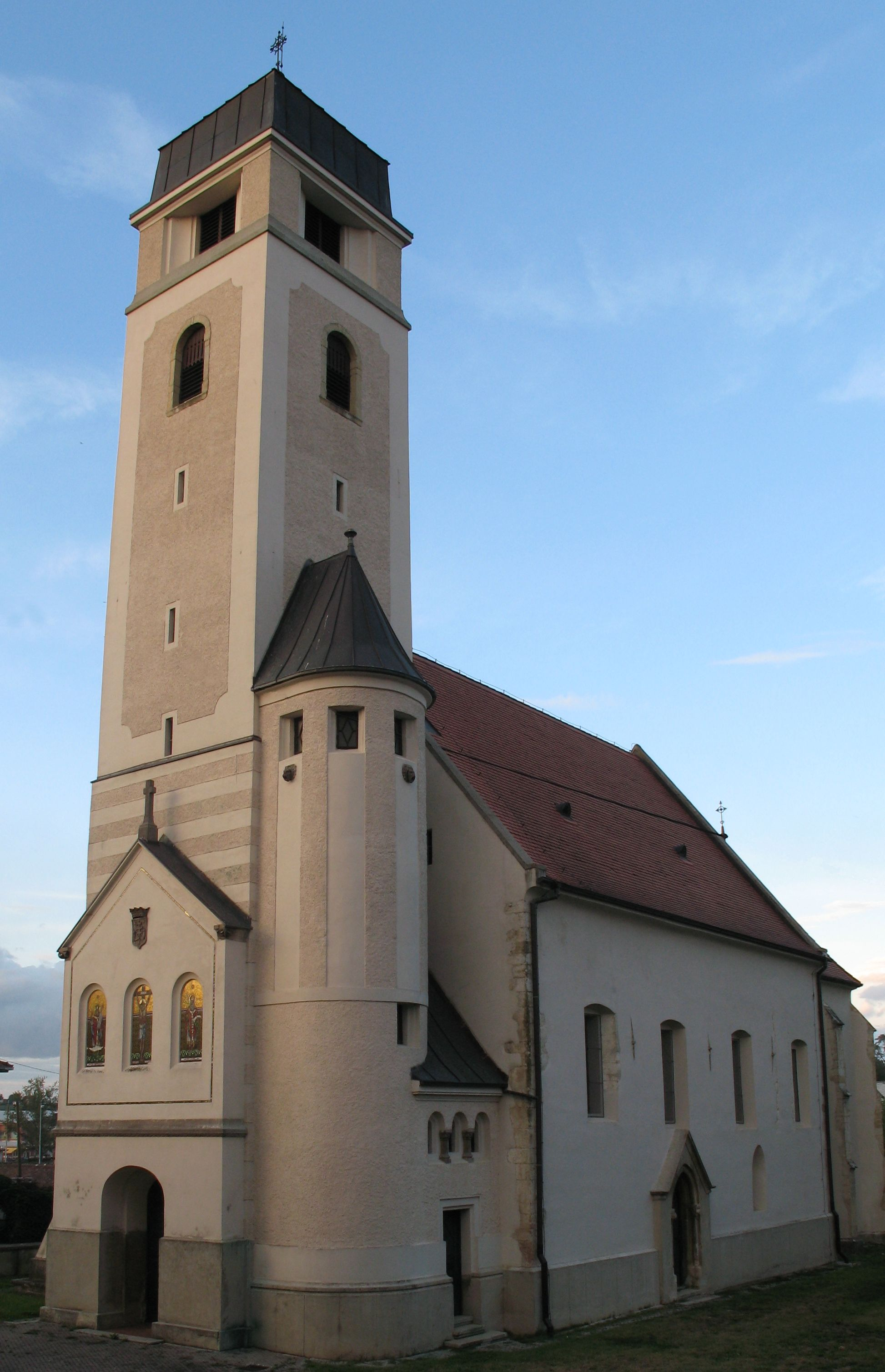
Holy Cross church in Križevci, the site of the massacre

Bloody Sabor of Križevci or Bloody Parliament Session or Križevci Bloody Assembly (Croatian: Krvavi Sabor u Križevcima, Krvavi sabor križevački; Hungarian: kőrösi országgyűlés) was an organised killing of the former Croatian ban Stephen II Lackfi and his followers by King Sigismund in Križevci, Croatia, on 27 February 1397. The episode was part of a quarter-century-long fight over the Hungarian-Croatian crown after the death of Louis I of Hungary. During this prolonged struggle, Croatia was a stronghold of the Anjou-Durazzo party fighting against King Sigismund.

== Prelude ==
After the disastrous Battle of Nicopolis, King Sigismund called for a meeting of the Sabor in the city of Križevci and issued a written guarantee (saluus conductus) stating he would not attempt personal revenge on his opponents or harm them in any way. He betrayed this promise, however, and secretly organised the murder of the Croatian Ban Stephen II Lackfi (Stjepan Lacković) and his followers for supporting the opponent king candidate Ladislaus of Naples. The Croatian law dictated that no one could enter the Sabor with arms, so Ban Lackfi and his supporters left their arms in front of the church. Lackfi's supporting troops also remained outside the town. The king's supporters, on the other hand, were already in the church, fully armed. In the turbulent debate that followed, the king's supporters accused Lackfi of treason in the Battle of Nicopolis. Harsh words were used, a fight started, and the king's vassals pulled their swords in front of the king, killing Lackfi, his nephew Stephen III Lackfi, who formerly served as Hungary's Master of the Horse, and the supporting nobility.

== Aftermath ==
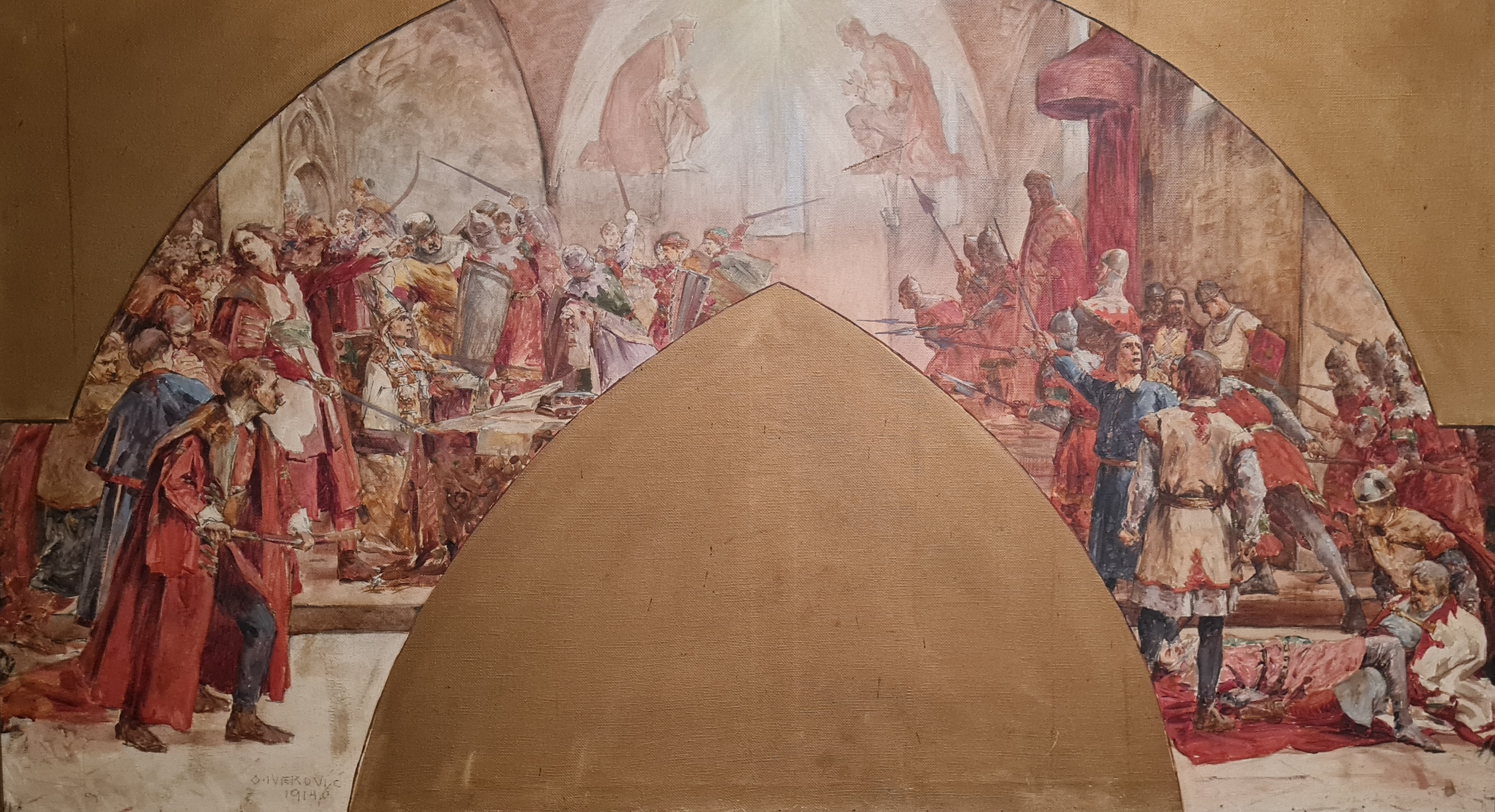
Painting by Oton Iveković

On the news of the Ban's death, the Croatian army rushed to Križevci and began a battle with Sigismund's supporters. In an unequal struggle, thirty Croats fell before they retreated.

Enraged, the Croatian nobility, led by Stjepan Prodavić, tried to take revenge on the king for Lackfi's murder, but they were suppressed, and Sigismund used the opportunity to cross the Drava river on March 2 with his subjects and fled to Hungary. Two days later he issued in Žakanj the famous charter by which the city of Čakovec (Csáktornya), Međimurje and other estates of Stephen Lackfi were donated to his loyal subjects, first among them being Hermann II, Count of Celje.

Bloody Sabor resulted in Sigismund's fear of revenge from Lackfi's men, and led to new rebellions of the nobles in Croatia and Bosnia (resulting in the deaths of 170 Bosnian nobles who were killed by Sigismund) and the selling off of Dalmatia to Venice for 100,000 ducats by Ladislaus of Naples. Finally, after 25 years of fighting, Sigismund succeeded in seizing power and was recognized as king by means of giving privileges to the Croatian nobility.
