= Glabušovce =

Village and municipality in Slovakia

Glabušovce Galábocs
- Municipality
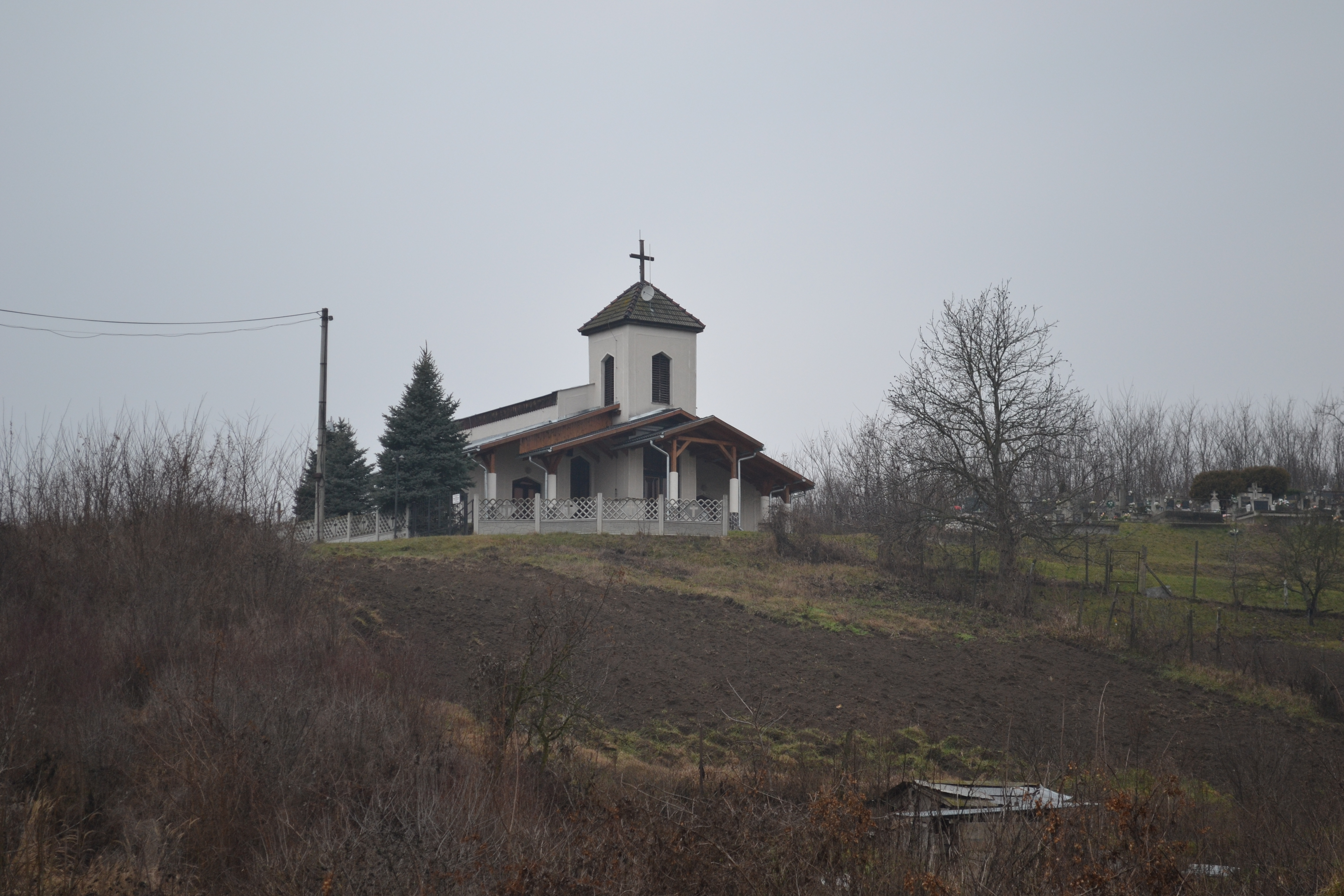

- Flag

- Location of Glabušovce in the Banská Bystrica Region Location of Glabušovce in Slovakia
- Coordinates: 48.15°N 19.47°E
- Country: Slovakia
- Region: Banská Bystrica Region
- District: Veľký Krtíš District
- First mentioned: 1297

Area
  - Total: 4.50 km^{2} (1.74 sq mi)
- Elevation: 170 m (560 ft)

Population (2025)
  - Total: 119
- Time zone: UTC+1 (CET)
  - Summer (DST): UTC+2 (CEST)
- Postal code: 991 22
- Area code: +421 47
- Vehicle registration plate (until 2022): VK
- Website: www.glabusovce.sk

Glabušovce (Hungarian: Galábocs) is a village and municipality in southern Slovakia. It is located in the Veľký Krtíš District of the Banská Bystrica Region.

== Geography ==
The municipality lies at an altitude of 170 metres (560 ft) and covers an area of 4.50 km^{2} (1.74 sq mi) (2025).

== History ==
In historical records, the village was first mentioned in 1297. Then known as Galabuch, it belonged to many feudatories, including Kacsics, Prónyai and Beney. In 1554, Glabušovce was completely destroyed by the Ottoman Turks, who dominated the area from 1554 to 1594. From 1938 to 1945, it was controlled by Hungary.

== Genealogical resources ==
The records for genealogical research are available at the state archive "Statny Archiv in Banska Bystrica, Slovakia"

- Roman Catholic church records (births/marriages/deaths): 1787-1874 (parish B)
- Lutheran church records (births/marriages/deaths): 1745-1931 (parish B)

== Population ==
Population statistic (10 years)
Year	1995	2005	2015	2025
Count	132	111	122	119
Difference		−15.90%	+9.90%	−2.45%

Population statistic
Year	2024	2025
Count	121	119
Difference		−1.65%

It has a population of 119 people (31 December 2025).

=== Ethnicity ===
Census 2021 (1+ %)
Ethnicity	Number	Fraction
Slovak	80	70.79%
Hungarian	33	29.2%
Not found out	5	4.42%
Romani	2	1.76%
Total	113	

In year 2021 was 113 people by ethnicity 80 as Slovak, 33 as Hungarian, 5 as Not found out and 2 as Romani.

Note on population: The difference values of population numbers in the table "Population statistic" and in the sections "Ethnicity" & "Religion" is caused by the use of various statistical methods.

=== Religion ===
Census 2021 (1+ %)
Religion	Number	Fraction
Roman Catholic Church	82	72.57%
None	15	13.27%
Evangelical Church	8	7.08%
Not found out	6	5.31%
Total	113	

In year 2021 was 113 people by religion 82 from Roman Catholic Church, 15 from None, 8 from Evangelical Church, 6 from Not found out, 1 from Greek Catholic Church and 1 from Ad hoc movements.

== See also ==
- List of municipalities and towns in Slovakia
