= Balog (genus) =

Hungarian clan

Genus (gens) Balog
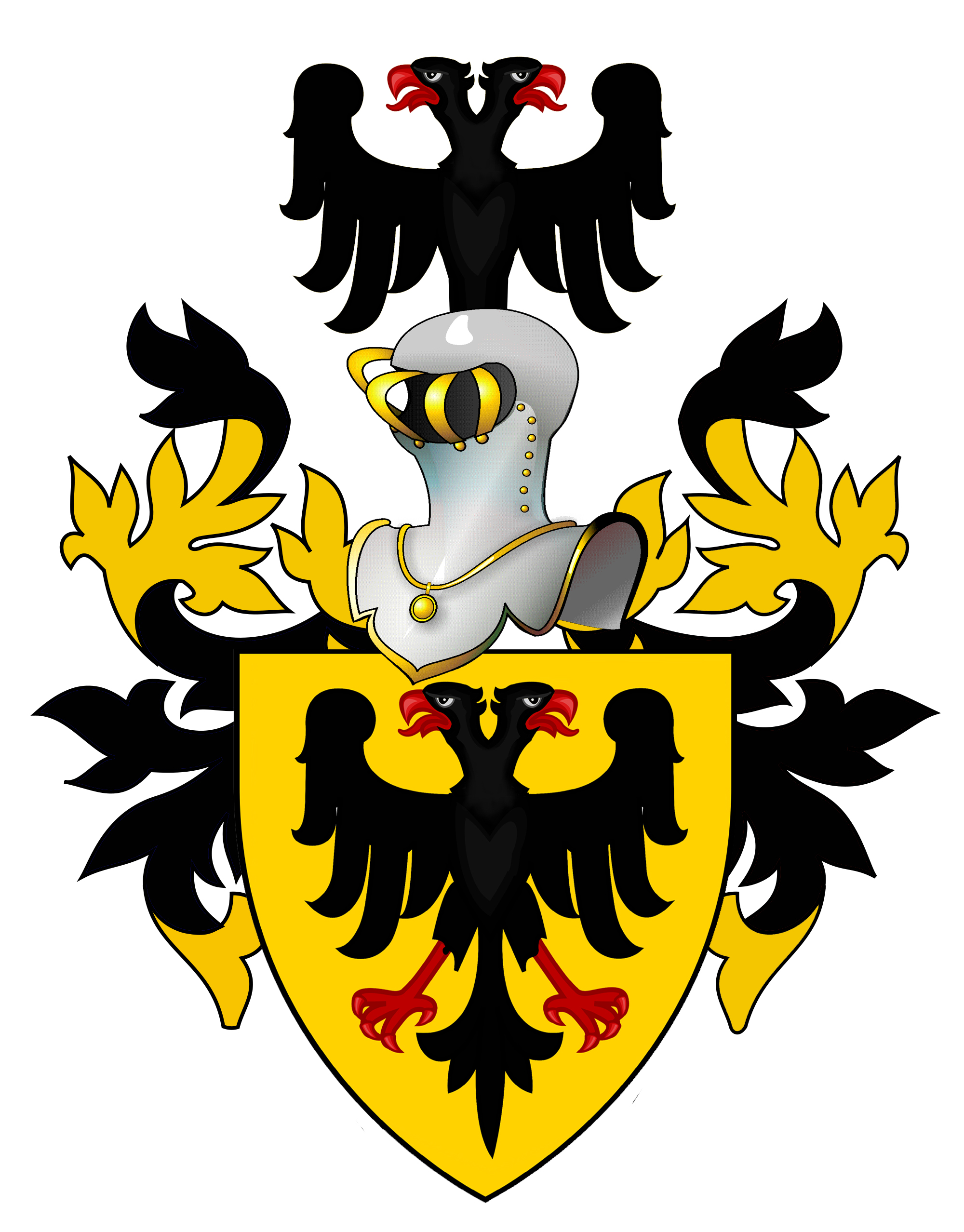
- Country: Kingdom of Hungary
- Founded: c. 1046
- Founder: Altmann von Friedberg
- Cadet branches: House of Baloghy; House of Szécsi; House of Derencsényi; House of Atfy

Balog or Balogh was a medieval family or clan (Latin generatio) of Hungarian nobles which is believed to have been founded by the German knight Altmann von Friedberg, somewhat around 1046, when he settled in the Kingdom of Hungary. The family branches spread over time all throughout the Kingdom of Hungary and within the Austrian Empire and Austro-Hungarian Monarchy during the centuries. Notable members:

- Paul, Bishop of Veszprém (1263–1275)
- Paul, Bishop of Pécs (1293–1306)
- Henry (fl. 1299–1300)

Notable families deriving their ancestry from the Balog:

- Derencsényi
- Szécsi
- Balogh de Mankó Bük
- Balogh de Galantha
