= Hrušovo =

Hrušovo Balogrussó
- Municipality
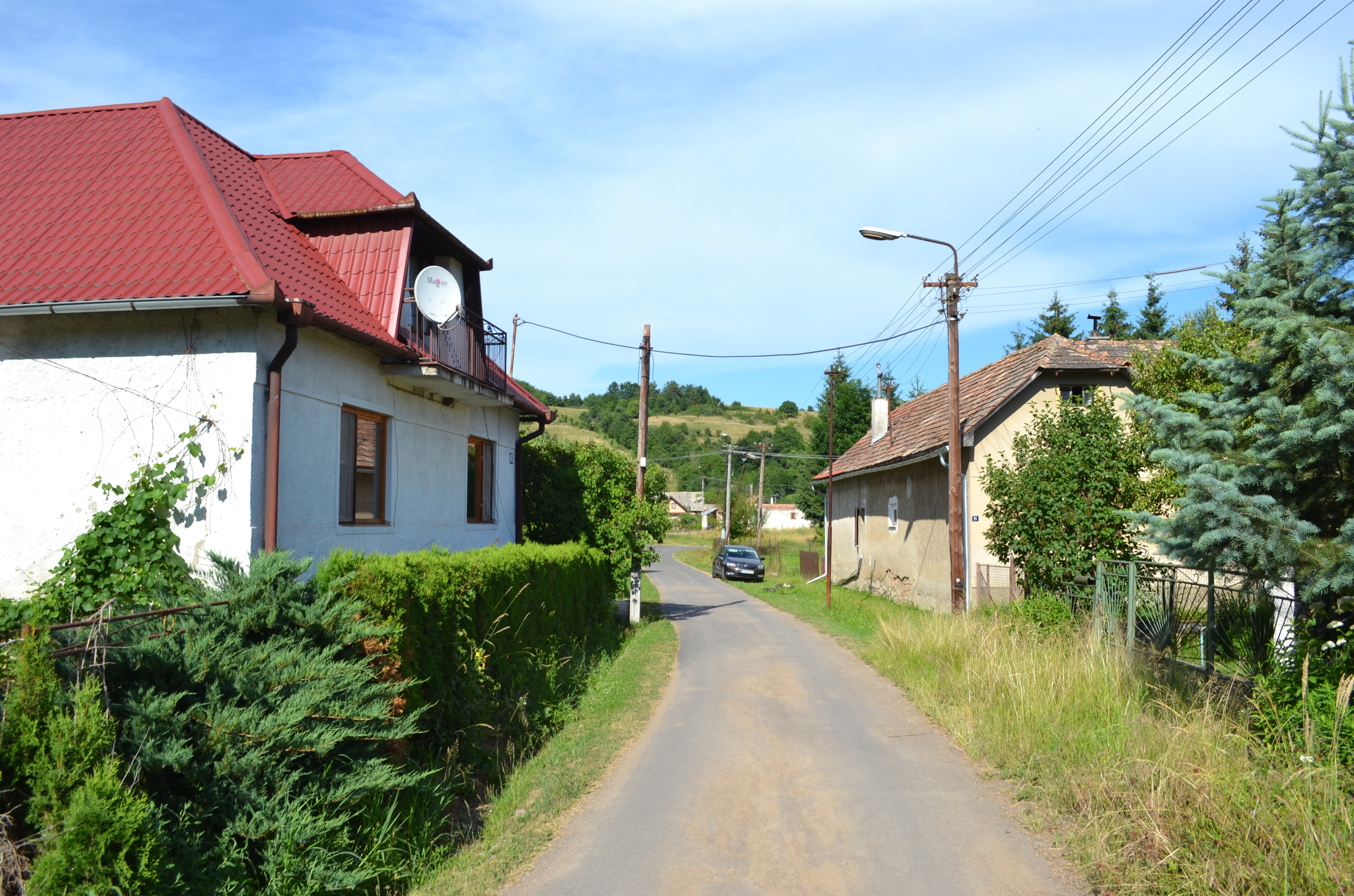

- Flag

- Location of Hrušovo in the Banská Bystrica Region Location of Hrušovo in Slovakia
- Coordinates: 48.52°N 20.05°E
- Country: Slovakia
- Region: Banská Bystrica Region
- District: Rimavská Sobota District
- First mentioned: 1297

Area
  - Total: 15.77 km^{2} (6.09 sq mi)
- Elevation: 273 m (896 ft)

Population (2025)
  - Total: 154
- Time zone: UTC+1 (CET)
  - Summer (DST): UTC+2 (CEST)
- Postal code: 980 25
- Area code: +421 47
- Vehicle registration plate (until 2022): RS

Hrušovo (Hungarian: Balogrussó) is a village and municipality in the Rimavská Sobota District of the Banská Bystrica Region of southern Slovakia. In the village are preserved typical 19th-century houses. Furthermore, in Hrušovo is foodstuff store, post, public library.

== Geography ==
The municipality lies at an altitude of 273 metres (896 ft) and covers an area of 15.77 km^{2} (6.09 sq mi) (2025).

== History ==
In historical records, the village was first mentioned in 1297 (1297 Huruswa, 1427 Hrwswa, 1511 Rwsowa). After, it passed to Muráň town. Locals had been engaged in weaving and basketry.

== Population ==
Population statistic (10 years)
Year	1995	2005	2015	2025
Count	257	221	183	154
Difference		−14.00%	−17.19%	−15.84%

Population statistic
Year	2024	2025
Count	161	154
Difference		−4.34%

It has a population of 154 people (31 December 2025).

=== Ethnicity ===
Census 2021 (1+ %)
Ethnicity	Number	Fraction
Slovak	165	95.93%
Hungarian	4	2.32%
Czech	2	1.16%
Not found out	2	1.16%
Total	172	

In year 2021 was 172 people by ethnicity 165 as Slovak, 4 as Hungarian, 2 as Czech and 2 as Not found out.

Note on population: The difference values of population numbers in the table "Population statistic" and in the sections "Ethnicity" & "Religion" is caused by the use of various statistical methods.

=== Religion ===
Census 2021 (1+ %)
Religion	Number	Fraction
Evangelical Church	82	47.67%
None	53	30.81%
Roman Catholic Church	32	18.6%
Jehovah's Witnesses	2	1.16%
Not found out	2	1.16%
Total	172	

In year 2021 was 172 people by religion 82 from Evangelical Church, 53 from None, 32 from Roman Catholic Church, 2 from Jehovah's Witnesses, 2 from Not found out and 1 from Ad hoc movements.

== Genealogical resources ==
The records for genealogical research are available at the state archive "Statny Archiv in Banska Bystrica, Slovakia"

- Lutheran church records (births/marriages/deaths): 1787-1852 (parish A)

== See also ==
- List of municipalities and towns in Slovakia
