= Andrew Lackfi =

Andrew Lackfi (Hungarian: Lackfi András; c. 1310 – October 1359) was an influential nobleman and a successful military leader in the Kingdom of Hungary. He was Count of the Székelys between 1343 and 1350, Ban of Macsó from 1355 to 1356, and Voivode of Transylvania between 1356 and 1359.

== Early life ==
Andrew was a younger son of Lack, or Ladislaus, of the Hermán kindred, who was Count of the Székelys from 1328. Andrew was born around 1310. His brother, Denis, who became a Franciscan friar, was the tutor of the future Louis I of Hungary. Lack's sons and grandsons held important offices after Louis I ascended the throne in 1342.

== Early career ==
Andrew replaced his father as count of the Székelys and ispán, or head, of the Transylvanian Saxon district of Medgyes (now Mediaș in Romania) in 1343. Next year, he also became the head of the Saxon districts of Beszterce and Brassó (now Bistrița and Brașov in Romania). The office of the head of Beszterce district was attached to the honour of the Counts of the Székelys during his tenure.

To take revenge of the Tatar invasions of Transylvania in the previous years, Louis I dispatched Andrew to lead a military campaign across the territories subjected to the Golden Horde. Andrew and his Székely warriors crossed the Carpathian Mountains and imposed a decisive defeat upon a large Tatar army on 2 February 1345.

== Sources ==
- Engel, Pál (1996). Magyarország világi archontológiája, 1301–1457, I. [Secular Archontology of Hungary, 1301–1457, Volume I] (in Hungarian). História, MTA Történettudományi Intézete. ISBN 963-8312-44-0.
- Engel, Pál (2001). The Realm of St Stephen: A History of Medieval Hungary, 895–1526. I.B. Tauris Publishers. ISBN 1-86064-061-3.
- Markó, László (2006). A magyar állam főméltóságai Szent Istvántól napjainkig: Életrajzi Lexikon [Great Officers of State in Hungary from King Saint Stephen to Our Days: A Biographical Encyclopedia] (in Hungarian). Helikon Kiadó. ISBN 963-547-085-1.
- Spinei, Victor (1986). Moldavia in the 11th–14th Centuries. Editura Academiei Republicii Socialiste România.
