= Count of the Székelys =

Leader of the Hungarian-speaking Székelys in Transylvania

The Count of the Székelys (Hungarian: székelyispán, Latin: comes Sicolorum) was the leader of the Hungarian-speaking Székelys in Transylvania, in the medieval Kingdom of Hungary. First mentioned in royal charters of the 13th century, the counts were the highest-ranking royal officials in Székely Land. From around 1320 to the second half of the 15th century, the counts' jurisdiction included four Transylvanian Saxon districts, in addition to the seven Székely seats (or administrative units).

The counts also held important castles outside the territories under their administration, including their seat at Görgény (now Gurghiu in Romania). They were the supreme commanders of the Székely troops; their military campaigns against Bulgaria and the Golden Horde were mentioned in royal charters and medieval chronicles. The counts presided over the general assemblies of both the individual Székely seats and the entire Székely community. They also heard appeals of the decisions of the supreme court of Székely Land.

Beginning in the late 14th century, Hungarian monarchs appointed two or three noblemen to jointly hold the office. From the 1440s, at least one of these joint holders was also regularly made Voivode of Transylvania, because frequent Ottoman raids against Transylvania required the centralization of the military command of the province. The offices of the count and the voivode were in practice united after 1467. From the late 16th century, the princes of Transylvania (as successors to the voivodes) also styled themselves as counts of the Székelys. After the integration of the principality with the Habsburg Empire, in the early 18th century, the title was in abeyance until Maria Theresa revived it at the Székelys' request. She and her successors on the Hungarian throne used the title until 1918.

== Origins ==
The origin of the office is obscure. The Hungarian-speaking Székelys were a "well organized community of warriors" in the medieval Kingdom of Hungary. They originally lived in scattered groups along the frontiers of the kingdom. In Transylvania, they first settled along the rivers Kézd (Saschiz), Orbó (Gârbova), and Sebes (Sebeș), but started to migrate to the easternmost region of the province when the ancestors of the Transylvanian Saxons began to arrive around 1150.

Bishop Otto of Freising mentioned that "two counts" commanded the archers in the vanguard of the Hungarian army in the Battle of the Fischa, in 1146. The Hungarian chronicles recorded that Székelys and Pechenegs formed the vanguard of the Hungarian army in that battle, thus the bishop's report may contain the first reference to a count of the Székelys, according to Attila Zsoldos, Gyula Kristó, and other historians. On the other hand, as historian Zoltán Kordé emphasizes, 13th-century royal charters mentioned other royal officials who ruled Székely groups, suggesting that the office had not been established in the previous century. For instance, a royal charter tells of an army of Saxon, Vlach, Székely, and Pecheneg troops fighting in Bulgaria under the command of Joachim, Count of Hermannstadt (now Sibiu in Romania), in the early 1210s.

The earliest royal charter mentioning a "count and commander of the Székelys" was issued in 1235. It refers to a military campaign launched against Bulgaria in 1228. Thus, the office must have existed in that year at the latest, but the count was not the sole ruler of all Székelys for decades after. For instance, a diploma of Béla IV of Hungary refers to the count of the Székelys of Nagyváty in Baranya County. Lack Hermán, who held the office from 1328 to 1343, was styled as "count of the three clans of the Székelys"; but the exact meaning of the title is unknown.

== Functions ==
The Székelys were organized into special administrative units (originally known as "lands", "districts", "communities" or "universities") in Transylvania. These units were known as "seats" beginning in the second half of the 14th century. Székely Land was divided into seven seats. Udvarhelyszék, Marosszék, Csíkszék, Kézdiszék, Orbaiszék, and Sepsiszék formed a contiguous territory in south-eastern Transylvania; Aranyosszék was located apart from them in the central region.

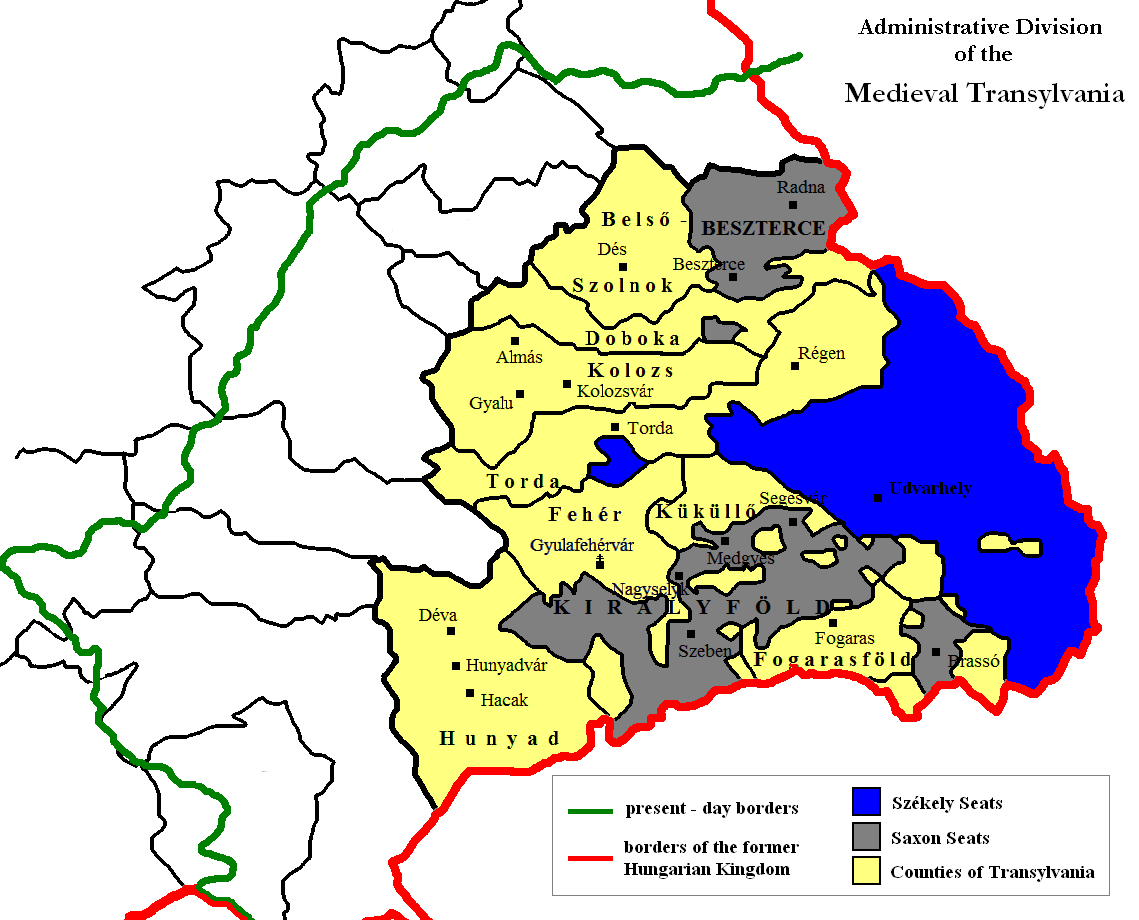
Székely Land (in blue) in Transylvania within the medieval Kingdom of Hungary

The jurisdiction of the counts was not limited to Székely Land. The Saxon district of Mediasch (now Mediaș in Romania) was subject to them until Sigismund of Luxemburg, King of Hungary, exempted the inhabitants from the counts' authority in 1402. The counts were almost continuously also the rulers of the Saxons of Bistritz (present-day Bistrița in Romania) from 1320. This district was granted to John Hunyadi by Ladislaus V of Hungary in 1453. The Saxons of Kronstadt and Burzenland (now Brașov and Țara Bârsei in Romania) were also under the jurisdiction of the counts from 1344 until the mid-15th century.

The counts held one of the most important honors in the Kingdom of Hungary. The system of honors allowed a great officer of the realm to enjoy all royal revenues connected to his office. The fines imposed in the Székely seats were to be paid to the counts. Each seat was also required to give a horse to the new count at his installation. The counts also received the royal revenues from the Saxon territories under their jurisdiction. However, most of their revenues came from the estates attached to the royal castles that they held outside Székely Land. The counts kept the right of possession of these royal castles after most high officers of the realm had lost such rights around 1402. The counts most frequently held court in the castle of Görgény, in Torda County (at present-day Gurghiu in Romania). The castle was first mentioned as being in the counts' possession in 1358. It was granted to Hunyadi in 1453. The castle of Höltövény in Alsó-Fehér County (now Hălchiu in Romania) was first mentioned as the counts' honor in 1335. The counts also seized the castles of Törcsvár and Királykő in Felső-Fehér County (now Bran Castle and Oratea Fortress in Romania), the latter being listed among the castles held by Hunyadi's sons in 1457.

The counts were the supreme commanders of the Székely troops. They were responsible for the regular supervision of the Székely warriors' military equipment. Bogomer, the first known count, was captured during a military campaign in Bulgaria in 1228. Lack Hermán, who held the office from 1328 to 1343, also styled himself the commander of the royal army stationed between the rivers Rába and Rábca during a campaign against Austria in 1336. Andrew Lackfi and his Székely troops inflicted a crushing defeat on the Tatars of the Golden Horde in early February 1345. The counts Michael Jakcs and Henry Tamási helped the Hungarian noblemen against rebellious Transylvanian peasants in 1437 and 1438. They commanded the Székely army in the first battle against the peasants at Bábolna (now Bobâlna in Romania) in the summer of 1437. They signed the agreement between the leaders of the noblemen, the Saxons, and the Székelys that declared their "Brotherly Union" against their enemies on 16 September.

The counts had important judicial functions in Székely Land and the Saxon districts subject to them. They headed the general assemblies of each Székely seat and the entire Székely community. Such an assembly was first recorded in 1344. Thereafter, the assemblies developed into important forums for the administration of justice. Lack Hermán was mentioned as the "judge of the Székelys" in the first half of the 14th century, evidence that the counts had acquired significant judicial authority by that time. The medieval judicial system of Székely Land is poorly documented. Available data suggests that the court of Udvarhelyszék was an appellate court, hearing appeals of the decisions of the courts of other seats. Appeals of the decisions of the court of Udvarhelyszék were heard by the count. The courts of justice in the seats were initially presided over by elected officials, the seat judge, and the captain. New officials, known as royal judges, appear in the sources in the 1420s. Appointed by the count, royal judges supervised the activities of the elected officials.

== Monarchs and counts ==
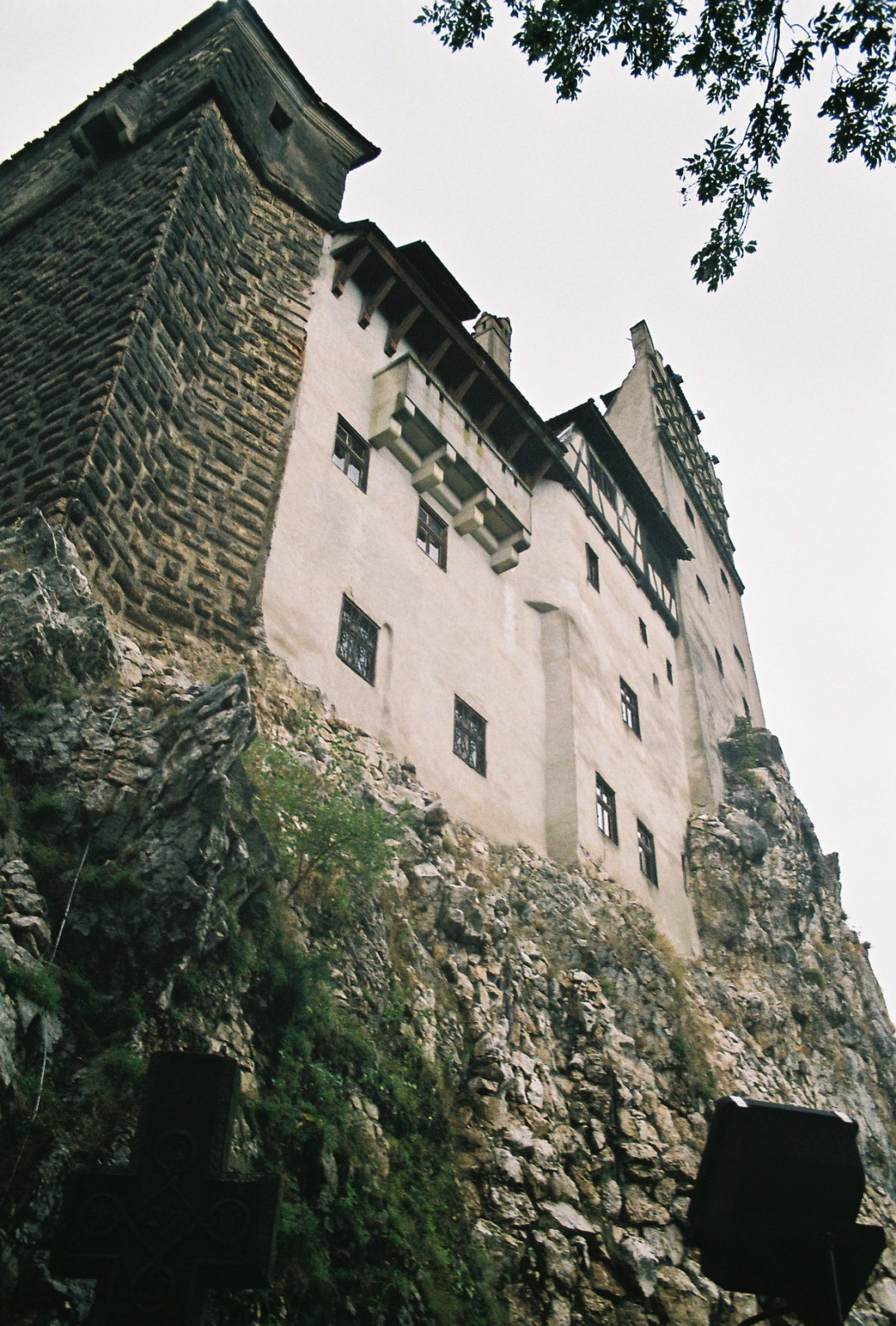
Törcsvár (now Bran Castle in Romania), a fortress held outside Székely Land by the counts

The counts represented the kings of Hungary in the territories under their jurisdiction and were independent of the voivodes of Transylvania. This separation of the two offices helped preserve the Székelys' special legal status. However, the kings never appointed a Székely to the office, which they tended to give to a kinsman of the voivode. The counts were regarded as barons of the realm, although they were not listed among the great officers in royal charters.

Ladislaus Kán took control of the whole of Transylvania after the death of Andrew III of Hungary in 1301. During the ensuing interregnum, Kán also usurped the administration of Székely Land. Royal authority was restored only after his death in about 1315. In that year, Charles I of Hungary made the brothers Thomas and Stephen Losonci counts. Their successor, Simon Kacsics, was dismissed in 1327 or 1328, because he had committed "serious crimes", according to a contemporaneous royal charter. Thereafter, the office was almost continuously held by the Lackfis for about 50 years.

The Lackfis and their immediate successors were the kings' loyal supporters, but Sigismund of Luxemburg appointed close allies of John Kanizsai, Archbishop of Esztergom, to the office, for helping him seize the throne in 1387. Sigismund strengthened his position after he punished a rebellion by Kanizsai and his allies in 1403. Thereafter, he regularly appointed two noblemen to jointly hold the office. The 15th-century counts rarely visited Transylvania, and their deputies, the vice-counts, took over much of the performance of their duties. The existence of new officials (known as "governors", "captains", or "supreme captains of the Székelys") among the Székelys in this period is also documented, but their duties cannot be determined.

== End of the office ==
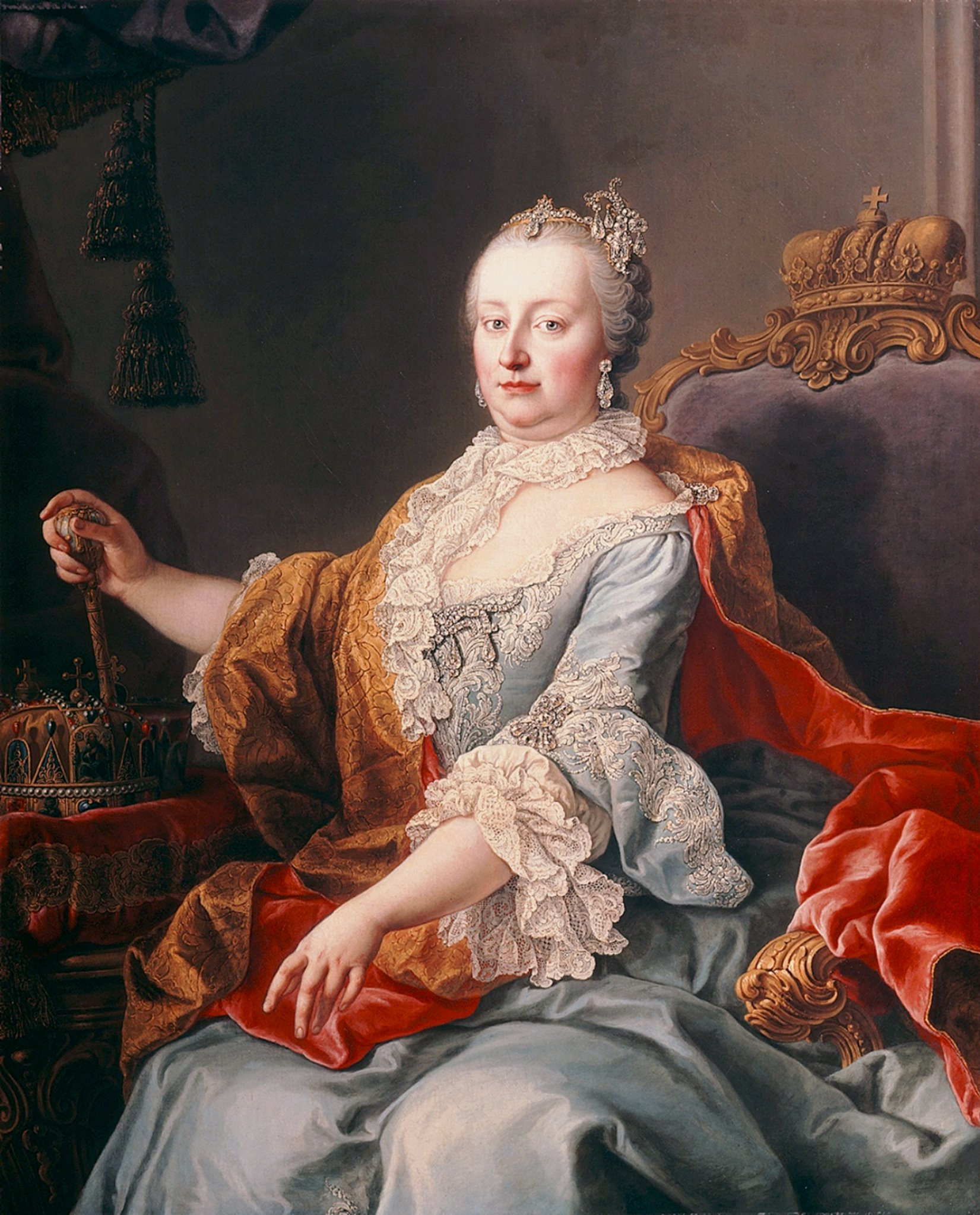
Maria Theresa, who started to style herself count of the Székelys at their request

The Ottomans made a series of plundering raids against Transylvania in the 1420s and 1430s, which led to better coordination of the defense of the province. Wladislas I, who was elected King of Hungary over the minor Ladislaus the Posthumous in 1440, decided to centralize the command of the southern border of Hungary. After his two principal military commanders, John Hunyadi and Nicholas Újlaki, annihilated the army of Ladislaus's supporters in early 1441, Wladislas made them joint voivodes of Transylvania and counts of the Székelys. This was the first occasion that the offices of voivode and count were conferred upon the same persons.

The unification of the two offices lasted for decades. Initially, between 1446 and 1467, two or three noblemen were jointly made voivodes and counts, and some of them occasionally held both offices. The two offices were in practice united after the death of John Daróci in 1467. Thereafter, the same person was made voivode and count until 1504; furthermore, the offices of vice-voivode and vice-count were also unified. A decree of 1498 still separately obliged the voivode and the count to muster troops; but after 1507, no separate counts were appointed.

The title of count was continuously used by the voivodes, and later by the princes of Transylvania, for almost two centuries. After the integration of the Principality of Transylvania into the Habsburg Empire in the late 17th century, the Habsburg monarchs did not style themselves counts of the Székelys. The title was revived at the Székelys' request by Maria Theresa. Thereafter, all kings of Hungary used the title.

== List of counts ==
=== Thirteenth century ===
Term	Incumbent	Monarch	Notes	Source
1228	Bogomer, son of Szoboszló	Andrew II	"count and commander of the Székelys"; first known holder of the dignity	
1291	Mojs Ákos	Andrew III		
1294–1299	Peter Bő the Toothed	Andrew III	according to a non-authentic charter also in 1300	

=== Fourteenth century ===
Term	Incumbent	Monarch	Notes	Source
1315–1320	Thomas Losonci	Charles I		
1315	Stephen Losonci	Charles I		
1321–1327	Simon Kacsics	Charles I	also ispán of Krassó County, and of Somlyó (now Șemlacu Mare in Romania), Mediasch and Bistritz	
1328–1343	Lack Hermán	Charles I, Louis I	"count of the three clans of the Székelys"; also ispán of Mediasch and Bistritz, and of Csanád County	
1343–1350	Andrew Lackfi	Louis I	also ispán of Mediasch, Bistritz and Kronstadt, and of Szatmár and Máramaros Counties; the counts administered Mediasch, without styling themselves its ispán from 1350 to 1402	
1350–1352	Nicholas Báthory	Louis I	also ispán of Kronstadt	
1352–1356	Leukus Raholcai the Tót	Louis I	also ispán of Kronstadt, and Master of the cupbearers and of the stewards; the counts administered Kronstadt, without styling themselves its ispán from 1355	
1356–1360	John Zsámboki, Jr.	Louis I		
1363–1367	Nicholas Lackfi, Jr.	Louis I	also ispán of Szatmár, Máramaros, Ugocsa and Kraszna Counties	
1367–1371	Stephen Lackfi of Csáktornya	Louis I		
1373–1376	Ladislaus Losonci, Sr.	Louis I		
1377–1380	Nicholas Derencsényi	Louis I		
1380–1382	Nicholas Perényi	Louis I		
1382–1385	Nicholas Losonci	Louis I, Mary		
1387–1390	Balc Béltelki	Sigismund	brothers; also ispáns of Szatmár and Máramaros Counties	
1387–1390	Drag Béltelki	Sigismund	brothers; also ispáns of Szatmár and Máramaros Counties	
1390	John Bélteki the Vlach	Sigismund		
1390–1391	Simon Szécsényi	Sigismund		
1391–1395	Stephen Kanizsai	Sigismund		
1395–1397	Francis Bebek	Sigismund		
1397–1401	Peter Perényi	Sigismund	together with John Maróti (1397–1398); also ispán of Szatmár and Ugocsa Counties, and (from 1398) of Ung County	
1397–1398	John Maróti	Sigismund	together with Peter Perényi (1397–1398)	

=== Fifteenth century ===
Term	Incumbent	Monarch	Notes	Source
1402–1403	George Csáki	Sigismund	also ispáns of Szatmár and Ugocsa Counties	
1402–1403	Denis Marcali	Sigismund	also ispáns of Szatmár and Ugocsa Counties	
1404	John Harapki	Sigismund		
1404	Ladislaus Monostori	Sigismund		
1405–1422	Michael Nádasi	Sigismund		
1422–1426	Peter Bebek	Sigismund		
1426–1432	John Jakcs	Sigismund	together with Michael Jakcs (1426–1432)	
1426–1438	Michael Jakcs	Sigismund	together with John Jakcs (1427–1431) and Henry Tamási (1437)	
1437–1438	Henry Tamási	Sigismund	together with Michael Jakcs (1437)	
1438–1441	Emeric Bebek	Albert	together with Francis Csáki	
1438–1441	Francis Csáki	Albert	first time; George Csáki's son; together with Emeric Bebek	
1440–1441	Stephen Bánfi	Ladislaus V	contested by Emeric Bebek and Francis Csáki; appointed by queen mother and regent Elizabeth of Luxembourg	
1441–1446	John Hunyadi	Wladislas I	also voivode of Transylvania, ban of Macsó, commander of Nándorfehérvár (Beograd, Serbia), and ispán of Arad, Csanád, Csongrád, Keve, Közép-Szolnok, Krassó, Temes (1441–1446), ispán of Máramaros County (1443–1445), ispán of Bihar County (1443–1446), ispán of Szabolcs and Ugocsa Counties (1444–1446), ispán of Kraszna County (1445), ispán of Szatmár County (1445–1446)	
1441–1446	Nicholas Újlaki	Wladislas I	also voivode of Transylvania, ban of Szörény, commander of Nándorfehérvár, and ispán of Arad, Bács, Baranya, Bodrog, Csongrád, Keve, Máramaros, Szerém, Temes, Tolna and Valkó Counties (1441–1446), ispán of Fejér County (1441–1443), and ispán of Torontál County (1444–1446), ispán of Somogy County (1444–1446)	
1446–1448	Francis Csáki		second time	
1449–1453	Raynald Rozgonyi		first time; together with John Rozgonyi (1449)	
1449–1453	Oswald Rozgonyi		first time; together with John Rozgonyi (1449)	
1449	John Rozgonyi		first time; together with Raynald and Oswald Rozgonyi	
1454–1457	John Ország	Ladislaus V	together with Emeric Hédervári (1454), with Oswald Rozgonyi (1454–1457), with Raynald Rozgonyi (1454–1457), and with John Rozgonyi (1457)	
1454	Emeric Hédervári	Ladislaus V	together with John Ország (1454)	
1454–1458	Oswald Rozgonyi	Ladislaus V	second time; together with John Ország (1454–1457), with Raynald Rozgonyi, and with John Rozgonyi (1457)	
1454–1458	Raynald Rozgonyi	Ladislaus V	second time; together with John Ország (1454–1457) and Oswald Rozgonyi	
1457	John Rozgonyi	Ladislaus V	second time; together with John Ország and Oswald Rozgonyi (1457); also voivode of Transylvania	
1458–1460	John Lábatlan	Matthias I	also ispán of Temes County (1459–1460); together with Ladislaus Paksi (1458–1459)	
1458–1459	Ladislaus Paksi	Matthias I	together with John Lábatlan (1458–1459)	
1460–1461	Oswald Rozgonyi	Matthias I	third time; together with Ladislaus Losonci (1460–1461), and with Sebastian and Raynald Rozgonyi (1461); also ispán of Abaúj County (1460–1461)	
1460–1461	Ladislaus Losonci	Matthias I	together with Oswald Rozgonyi (1460–1461)	
1461	Sebastian Rozgonyi	Matthias I	together with Oswald and Raynald Rozgonyi (1461); also voivode of Transylvania and ispán of Temes County	
1461–1463	Raynald Rozgonyi	Matthias I	together with Oswald and Sebastian Rozgonyi (1461); also ispán of Abaúj and Zemplén Counties	
1462–1465	John Pongrác of Dengeleg	Matthias I	first time; also voivode of Transylvania, ban of Szörény, and ispán of Közép-Szolnok County	
1465–1467	Count Sigismund Szentgyörgyi	Matthias I	also voivode of Transylvania	
1465–1467	Count John Szentgyörgyi	Matthias I	also voivode of Transylvania	
1465–1467	Bertold Ellerbach of Monyorókerék	Matthias I	also voivode of Transylvania	
1467	John Daróci	Matthias I		
1467–1472	John Pongrác of Dengeleg	Matthias I	second time; together with Nicholas Csupor of Monoszló (1468–1472); also voivode of Transylvania, ispán of Közép-Szolnok County, and ispán of Temes County (1470–1472)	
1468–1472	Nicholas Csupor of Monoszló	Matthias I	together with John Pongrác of Dengeleg (1468–1472); also voivode of Transylvania and ispán of Verőce County	
1472–1475	Blaise Magyar	Matthias I	also voivode of Transylvania, ispán of Közép-Szolnok County, and ispán of Temes County (1473–1475)	
1475–1476	John Pongrác of Dengeleg	Matthias I	third time; also voivode of Transylvania	
1477–1479	Peter Geréb of Vingárt	Matthias I	also voivode of Transylvania	
1479–1493	Stephen (V) Báthory of Ecsed	Matthias I, Wladislas II	also judge royal, voivode of Transylvania, and ispán of Somogy, Zala and Zaránd Counties	
1493–1498	Bartholomew Drágfi	Wladislas II	together with Ladislaus Losonci, Jr. (1493–1494); also voivode of Transylvania, ispán of Közép-Szolnok, Kraszna, Szabolcs, Szatmár and Ugocsa Counties	
1493–1495	Ladislaus Losonci, Jr.	Wladislas II	together with Bartholomew Drágfi of Béltek (1493–1495); also voivode of Transylvania and master of the treasury	
1498–1504	Count Peter Szentgyörgyi	Wladislas II	first time; also judge royal and voivode of Transylvania	

=== Sixteenth century ===
Term	Incumbent	Monarch	Notes	Source
1504–1507	John Tárcai	Wladislas II		
1507–1510	Count Peter Szentgyörgyi	Wladislas II	second time; also judge royal and voivode of Transylvania	
1510–1526	Count John Zápolya	Wladislas II, Louis II	also voivode of Transylvania, ispán of Liptó, Sáros, Sopron, Torna and Trencsén Counties, and ban of Szörény (1513–1516)	

== See also ==
- History of the Székely people
- Judge of the Cumans

== Sources ==
- C. Tóth, Norbert; Horváth, Richárd; Neumann, Tibor; Pálosfalvi, Tamás (2016). Magyarország világi archontológiája, 1458–1526, I. Főpapok és bárók [Secular Archontology of Hungary, 1458–1526, Volume I: Prelates and Barons] (in Hungarian). MTA Bölcsészettudományi Kutatóközpont Történettudományi Intézete. ISBN 978-963-416-035-9.
- Dörner, Anton E. (2005). "Transylvania between stability and crisis (1457–1541)". In Pop, Ioan-Aurel; Nägler, Thomas (eds.). The History of Transylvania, Vol. I. (until 1541). Romanian Cultural Institute. pp. 299–348. ISBN 973-7784-04-9.
- Engel, Pál (1996). Magyarország világi archontológiája, 1301–1457, I. [Secular Archontology of Hungary, 1301–1457, Volume I] (in Hungarian). História, MTA Történettudományi Intézete. ISBN 963-8312-44-0.
- Engel, Pál (2001). The Realm of St Stephen: A History of Medieval Hungary, 895–1526. I.B. Tauris Publishers. ISBN 1-86064-061-3.
- Kontler, László (1999). Millennium in Central Europe: A History of Hungary. Atlantisz Publishing House. ISBN 963-9165-37-9.
- Kordé, Zoltán (2013). "A székely ispáni méltóság kezdeteiről [About the origin of the office of the count of the Székelys]". In Tüdős S., Kinga (ed.). Kastélyok, udvarházak és lakóik a régi Székelyföldön (in Hungarian). Székely Nemzeti Múzeum. pp. 64–72. ISBN 978-973-0-15187-9.
- Kordé, Zoltán (2016). "Közigazgatás [Administration]; Katonáskodó székelyek az írott forrásokban [Székely soldiers in the written sources]". In Benkő, Elek; Oborni, Teréz (eds.). Székelyföld története, I. kötet: A kezdetektől 1562-ig (in Hungarian). Magyar Tudományos Akadémia Bölcsészettudományi Kutatóközpont, Erdélyi Múzeum-Egyesület, Haáz Rezső Múzeum. pp. 168–180, 305–320. ISBN 978-606-739-040-7.
- Kordé, Zoltán (2019). A székely ispáni méltóság története a kezdetektől 1467-ig [The History of the Dignity of Count of the Székelys from the Beginning to 1467]. Szeged: Szegedi Középkortörténeti Könyvtár. ISBN 978-615-80398-7-1.
- Kristó, Gyula (2003). Early Transylvania (895-1324). Lucidus Kiadó. ISBN 963-9465-12-7.
- Makkai, László (1994). "The Emergence of the Estates (1172–1526)". In Köpeczi, Béla; Barta, Gábor; Bóna, István; Makkai, László; Szász, Zoltán; Borus, Judit (eds.). History of Transylvania. Akadémiai Kiadó. pp. 178–243. ISBN 963-05-6703-2.
- Pop, Ioan-Aurel (2005). "Transylvania in the 14th century and the first half of the 15th century (1300–1456)". In Pop, Ioan-Aurel; Nägler, Thomas (eds.). The History of Transylvania, Vol. I. (until 1541). Romanian Cultural Institute. pp. 246–298. ISBN 973-7784-04-9.
- Stipta, István (1997). A magyar bírósági rendszer története [History of the Judicial System in Hungary] (in Hungarian). Multiplex Media - Debrecen University Press. ISBN 963-04-9197-4.
- Zsoldos, Attila (2011). Magyarország világi archontológiája, 1000–1301 [Secular Archontology of Hungary, 1000–1301] (in Hungarian). História, MTA Történettudományi Intézete. ISBN 978-963-9627-38-3.
