= Stephen II Lackfi =

Ban of Croatia, Palatine of Hungary and Voivode of Transylvania

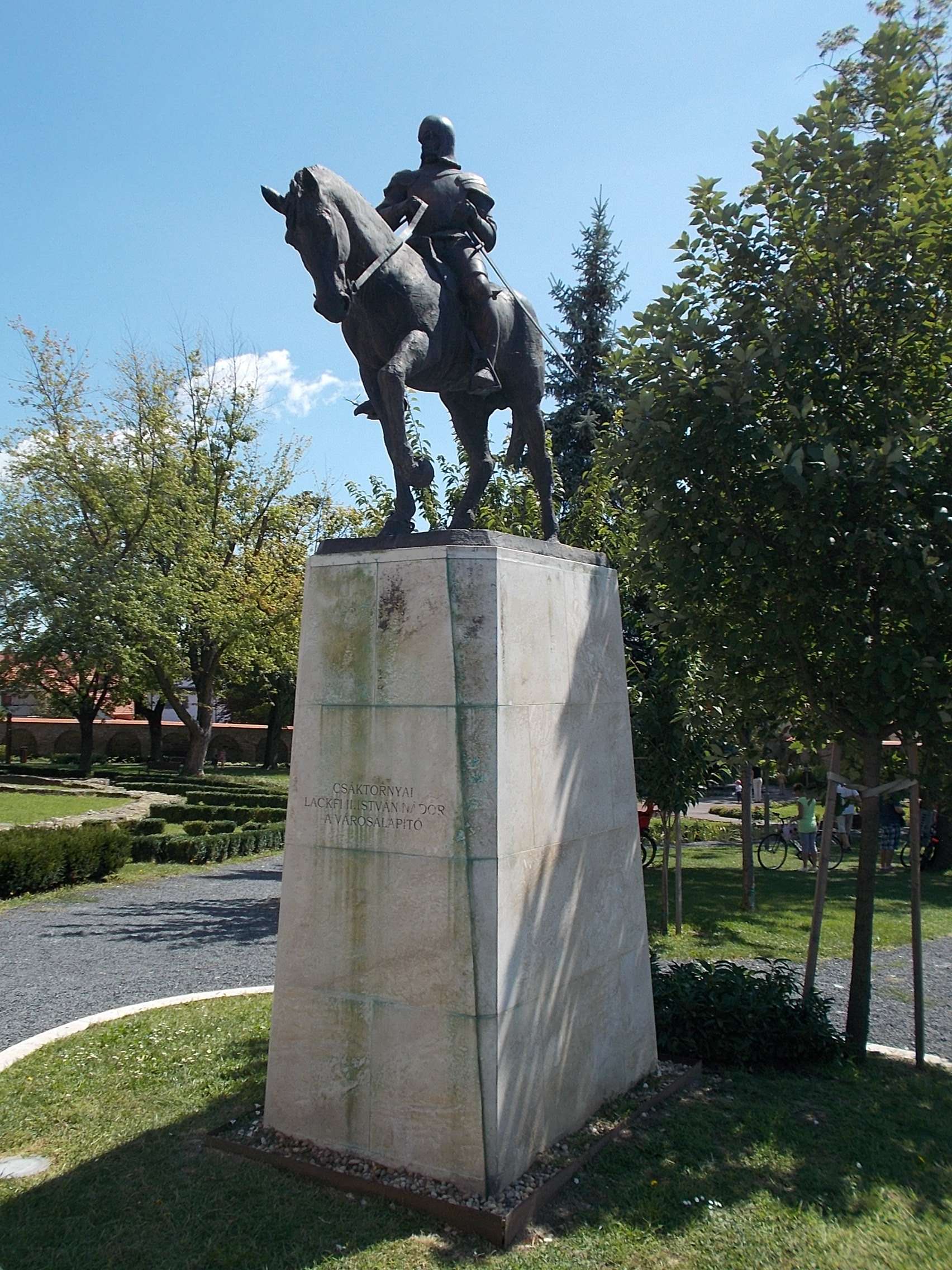
Statue of Stephen II Lackfi in Keszthely, Hungary

Stephen II Lackfi (Hungarian: Lackfi (II.) István, Croatian: Stjepan II. Lacković Čakovečki; died 27 February 1397 in Križevci) was Ban of Croatia, Palatine of Hungary and the Voivode of Transylvania from the Lackfi family. He was murdered at the Bloody Sabor of Križevci by the followers of king Sigismund. His estates were confiscated by the crown and the bulk of it, in the region of Međimurje, sold to the king's father-in-law Hermann of Celje.
