= Nicholas Szécsényi =

Hungarian landowner

Nicholas (II) Szécsényi
- Lord of Salgó
- Born: c. 1390
- Died: 19 January 1438; Venice, Republic of Venice
- Buried: San Pietro di Castello
- Noble family: House of Szécsényi
- Spouses: Hedwig of Masovia (alleged mistress)
- Father: Simon Szécsényi
- Mother: Elizabeth Garai

Nicholas (II) Szécsényi (Hungarian: Szécsényi (II.) Miklós), also known as Nicholas of Salgó (Hungarian: Salgói or Salgai Miklós, German: Nikolaus Schallaga; died 19 January 1438), was a Hungarian wealthy landowner and magnate, who solely inherited the large-scale estates of the powerful Szécsényi family. However he lost almost all of his fortune following conspiracy and lawsuit based on fabricated accusations, forcing him into exile to the Republic of Venice.

== Family and wealth ==
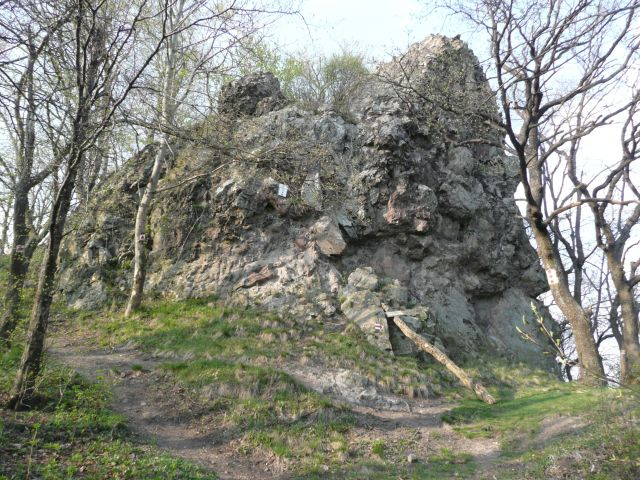
His former seat, the ruins of Salgó Castle in Börzsöny

Nicholas II was born into the influential Szécsényi family, which originated from the ancient Kacsics kindred, as the elder son of Simon Szécsényi, a staunch supporter of King Sigismund of Luxembourg, and Elizabeth Garai, sister of Palatine Nicholas Garai. He had two siblings, Thomas II, who was mentioned only once in 1407 and died early and Dorothea, who married captain Sigismund Losonci. Nicholas Szécsényi was born in the early 1390s. In 1401, an unidentified son of Simon was mentioned, which presumably refers to Nicholas. He first appeared in contemporary sources by name in 1407, during a possession case of his father. Feeling the nearness of his death, Simon Szécsényi concluded an inheritance contract with his nephew Ladislaus II (son of Simon's late brother Frank) in the presence of Judge royal Simon Rozgonyi on 9 December 1411 in Letkés. Accordingly, his son Nicholas would be the sole heir of Salgó Castle (Börzsöny), which was acquired by Simon alone decades earlier, while Tapolcsány (today Topoľčany, Slovakia) belonged to Frank's branch. Hollókő and Ajnácskő (today Hajnáčka, Slovakia) were classified to Ladislaus (Frank's son) and Nicholas (Simon's son), respectively, while those accessaries (villages and lands) were shared between the two branches. The remaining two castles (Somoskő and Bene) and the surrounding villages became a joint family property, while both branches had to appoint an own castellan, simultaneously.

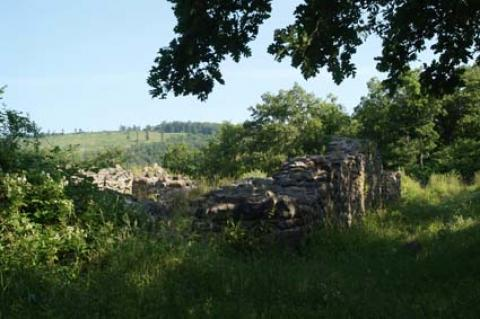
The ruins of Bene Castle

Simon Szécsényi died soon in January 1412, his fortune was inherited by his only surviving son Nicholas. A year later, his cousin Ladislaus II died suddenly and Nicholas became owner of the whole Szécsényi property, making him one of the richest landowners in the Kingdom of Hungary. As Ladislaus did not mention his namesake son in his last will and testament, it is presumable that Ladislaus III was born posthumously, who grew up in the court of Nicholas Szécsényi at Salgó Castle, which functioned as his permanent seat. In August 1414, Sigismund ordered the cathedral chapter of Vác to register Nicholas as possessor of the estate Bába (or Szenterzsébet) in Nógrád County, which implies he reached adulthood by then. In 1418, his sister Dorothea filed a lawsuit against him for issuing her heritage (daughter's quarta). Although she died in the next year, her son Ladislaus Losonci continued the lawsuit and Nicholas Szécsényi had to present his landholding charters in autumn 1422, according to the order of his uncle, Palatine Nicholas Garai.

Nicholas Szécsényi was among the Hungarian barons, who escorted Sigismund to his Western European diplomatic visit after August 1414. Alongside his monarch, he stayed in England in 1416, as he was referred to as "laske Michell" by The Chronicles of London. He also participated in the Council of Constance after that. Ulrich of Richenthal listed him among Sigismund's Hungarian accompaniment and referred to him as "Nicolaus Laschago von der Loben". Following the election of Pope Martin V, Szécsényi went on a pilgrimage to the Holy Land through Venice. Returning home, he was mentioned as a courtly knight. He participated in the first royal campaign against the Hussites in 1420 and 1421. As a result, Sigismund donated him coat of arms in Hradiště on 18 April 1421. Szécsényi escorted his monarch to Késmárk, Szepesség (today Kežmarok, Slovakia) in March 1423, and was one of the sixteen secular barons and prelates who provided safe-conduct to the envoys of Władysław II Jagiełło, King of Poland. His seal was also preserved by the document.

== First trial ==
At that time, in the year of 1424, there was a magnate in Hungary, by name Nikolaus Schallaga. This magnate was powerful, a maternal nephew of the Count Palatine [Nicholas Garai] and a son of Frank's brother Simon. He had eight good castles, great fortune and served his King with two thousand horses. Now, this Nikolaus Schallaga murdered his paternal cousin, [Ladislaus II Szécsényi] a son of Frank, who himself was a son of Krungo, [Kónya Szécsényi] beside he plundered, took away from the people what is theirs and did many evil things against the Hungarian law, thus more and more complaints were sent to the King of Rome, who [Sigismund] summoned and sentenced him. Since he could not stand if anyone takes away anything from others in his realm. [...] Therefore Schallaga was senctenced to death and loss of property, who fled the country, leaving behind his castles, lands and people. Then the King confiscated all his castles and estates, and ordered to demolish one of his castles. This [Salgó] was a royal castle and there were sixteen rooms in it. So this is how the expulsion of Schallaga happened. At the same time, the King founded a collegiate chapter in the town of Buda, at the chapel of Jewish Street, dedicated to God and Saint Sigismund, and donated most of Schallaga's fortune [to the chapter].

— Eberhard Windeckes Denkwürdigkeiten zur Geschichte des Zeitalters Kaiser Sigmunds p. 178.

Mór Wertner was the first historian, who identified "Nikolaus Schallaga" with Nicholas Szécsényi, later also supported by Albert Gárdonyi and Bernát Kumorovitz. Eberhard Windecke's narration was confirmed by contemporary royal charters, however the German burgher exaggerated the events at several points. On 19 August 1424, King Sigismund issued a diploma in Tata, when donated portions of Bolkács and Zsidve (today parts of Jidvei commune in Romania) to the town of Hermannstadt (today Sibiu, Romania). The document also narrates that both estates had belonged to Szécsényi, but became royal properties "due to [his] evil abuses and sinful acts". On 15 June 1439, Sigismund's successor King Albert handed Ajnácskő Castle to the Pálóci family, also mentioning that the fort once was part of Szécsényi's wealth, until the assemblies of Nógrád and Hont counties condemned him for coin counterfeiting, and consequently King Sigismund confiscated all of his estates. On 22 June 1439, Albert has returned the half of lands Szécsény, Almás and Sztracin (each of them laid in Nógrád County) to Ladislaus III Szécsényi. The document repeated the accusations one and a half decades ago against Nicholas Szécsényi. Later documents from 1456 and 1467 also confirm the allegations of counterfeiting (thus there is no report about murder and lootings). It is known that the assembly which sentenced Szécsényi was convened by Palatine Garai in Balassagyarmat on 3 November 1423. There the assembly ordered to confiscate his estates and commissioned Paul Besenyő of Özdöge to implement it. The following list contains the portions of Szécsényi's confiscated property:

Property	Type	New owners
Ajnácskő, Gömör County (today Hajnáčka, Slovakia)	Castle	Became royal property in 1424, its castellan was Stephen Berzevici. From 1425 to 1437, it was part of the pledge honor of Queen Barbara of Cilli. King Albert donated it to the Pálócis in 1439. 21 villages belonged to the castle partly or fully, in addition to a half of Rimaszombat (today Rimavská Sobota, Slovakia), which returned to Ladislaus Szécsényi in the same year.
Bene, Heves County	Castle	Became royal property in 1424, its castellan was Stephen Berzevici. Soon Sigismund ordered the castle to be destroyed. Its possessions were pledged to the Rozgonyi family in 1435.
Salgó, Hont County	Castle	Nicholas Szécsényi's permanent seat. It was demolished immediately after the confiscation process in 1424. Nine villages belonged to the Salgó lordship, which became a property of Matthew Pálóci (1429), then Szécsényi's nephew Ladislaus Losonci (1435), but soon he exchanged the landholdings with the royal court for Nicholas Szécsényi's former estates in Transylvania. Then Sigismund pledged the nine (later eight) villages to Peter Cseh of Léva in 1437.
Szécsény, Nógrád County	Oppidum	Albert returned the half of lands Szécsény and its belonging villages Almás and Sztracin to Ladislaus Szécsényi in 1439.
Nagycsalomja, Hont County (today Veľká Čalomija, Slovakia)	Village	The village was owned by Queen Barbara of Cilli after the confiscation. In 1439, Albert donated it to his spouse Queen Elizabeth of Luxembourg, among other settlements.
Csesztve, Nógrád County	Village	In 1439, Albert donated it to his spouse Queen Elizabeth of Luxembourg, among other settlements. Later it became a property of Ladislaus Losonci, Szécsényi's nephew.
Szentlőrinc, Nógrád County	Village	In 1439, Albert donated it to his spouse Queen Elizabeth of Luxembourg, among other settlements. Later it became a property of Ladislaus Pálóci, who donated the village to his familiaris Ladislaus Jánoki in 1456. The territory of once existent village now belongs to Érsekvadkert.
Szeli, Pozsony County (today Dolné Saliby, Slovakia)	Village	Szécsényi also possessed its custom right. In 1438, Albert handed over it to George Szentgyörgyi.
Csuda, Bars County	Village	Szécsényi owned half of the village, which became Ladislaus Szécsényi's property by 1435.
Sóskút, Pest County	Village	The lordship also contained half of Káposztásmegyer and Százhalom, in addition to parts of Érd and Berki. After the confiscation, it became a royal property. According to a charter from 1467, Sigismund had sold it to a certain Günther Stross for 6,000 gold coins.
In Transylvania	21 villages	Half of Teke (Kolozs County), Nagysajó (Doboka County), Sárpatak (Torda County), Zsidve and Bolkács (Küküllő County), Lándor, Hejőd and Acintos (Fehér County). Sigismund pledged them for a short time to the Jakcs de Kusaly family. After 1435, most of them became property of the Losonci family, then John Hunyadi.

Szécsényi has appealed to the court of king's personal presence, as Windecke and later deeds of donations confirmed. However Sigismund maintained the decision of the county assembly and ordered to confiscate half of the Szécsényi wealth in the spring or summer of 1424 (definitely before 19 August, when the King made the first donations from it). Ladislaus Szécsényi was granted other half part of the fortune, in accordance with the family contract which was concluded between the two branches in late 1411. A notorious forger, Gabriel Zomlini confessed during his trial in 1446 that he had falsified a charter in favour of Ladislaus to prevent the confiscation of the Szécsényi fortune. The document suggested that Simon and Frank received a privilege earlier that was not possible to confiscate the wealth due infidelity, since the other branch had to inherit it. There is no source that Ladislaus ever had used this fake. Sigismund personally visited the confiscated estates in Nógrád and Pest counties, on his way from the wedding of Władysław II Jagiełło and Sophia of Halshany in Kraków to his royal seat in Buda.

After the 1424 trial, Szécsényi lost all his property, becoming penniless. One of his uncles, John Garai took him into his residence, where Szécsényi spent the next years. His relative Ladislaus Szécsényi tried to pass the castle of Hegyesd as a titular pledge to Nicholas, which he inherited through maternal side, however Simon Rozgonyi, Bishop of Veszprém and his brothers reported his intention to the royal court. As a result, Sigismund, who has been abroad for years, forbade to Ladislaus to donate the fort to his relative, in his letter written on 25 September 1433 in Mantua, while travelled to the Council of Basel. Sigismund added Ladislaus could pledge the castle only to the Rozgonyis, in accordance with his instruction.

== Second trial and exile ==
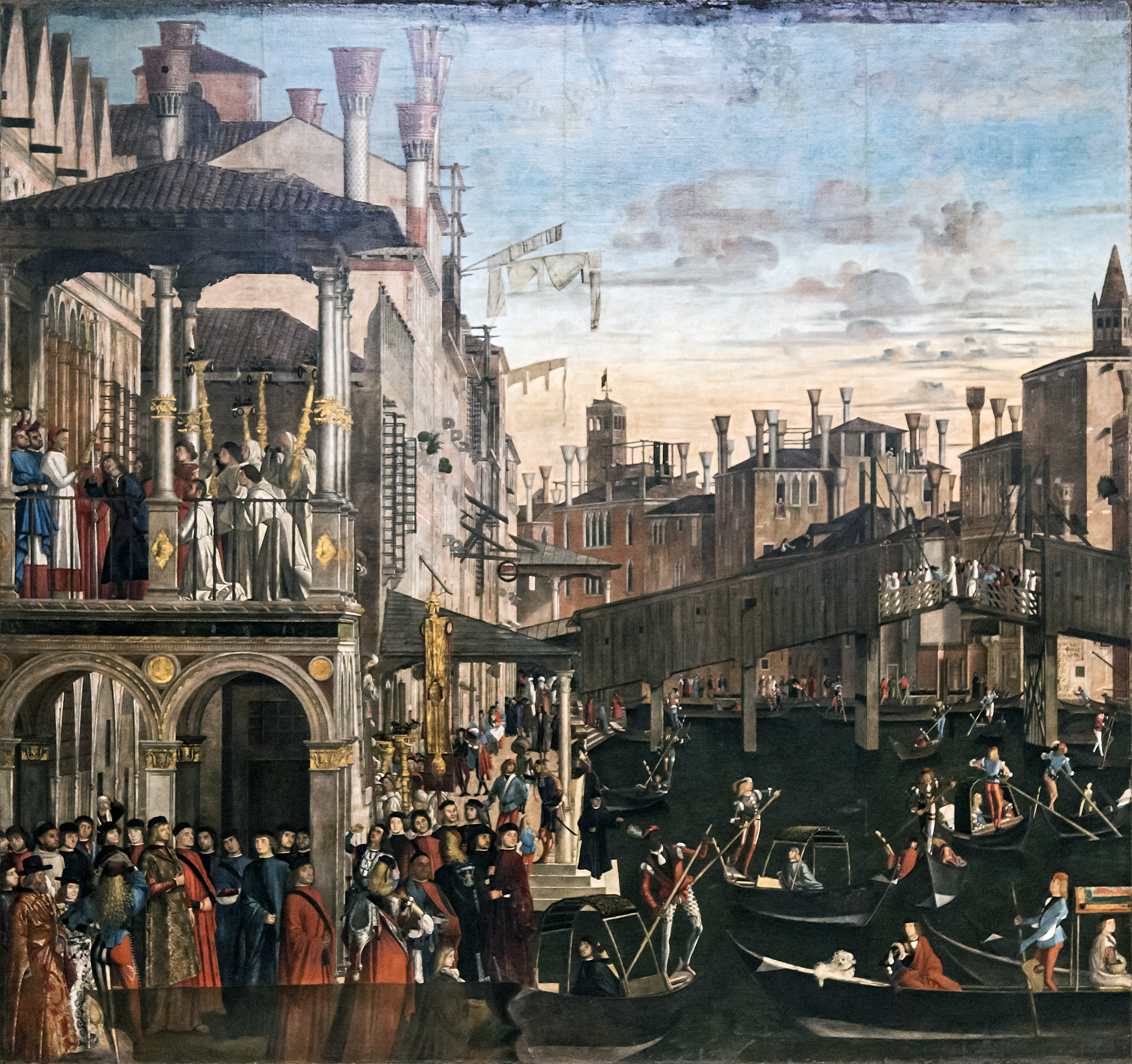
The Rialto in the 15th century, where Szécsényi spent his exile

John Garai died before 9 April 1428. After his death, Szécsényi remained the guest of Garai's widow Princess Hedwig of Masovia. This support by his maternal relatives led to his second trial. Sigismund returned to Hungary in October 1434, after that serious accusations have been made against Hedwig and Szécsényi. In March 1435, the Hungarian Diet which assembled in Pressburg (today Bratislava, Slovakia) began a process against Hedwig, who was accused of poisoning her husband, feared that he could discover her adulterous affair with Szécsényi. The testimony of members of the Garai family where enough evidence for King Sigismund, who dictated a harsh punishment against Hedwig: all her property was confiscated, and she was imprisoned for life in the castle of her husband's family, while Szécsényi was exiled from the kingdom with the "eternal shame of infidelity" in October 1435.

Szécsényi fled Hungary for Venice, where he spent the rest of his life. Initially, he lived next to the Chiesa della Santissima Trinità in Castello, Venice, then (from April 1437) at the Chiesa di San Simeone Profeta in Santa Croce. He rented both palaces. According to a contract from 19 November 1436, he had sent his familiaris John Pelsőci to take over 100 gold ducats from his cousin Ladislaus Garai, Ban of Macsó. Garai handed over the amount requested, but Pelsőci later claimed he was attacked and robbed by highwaymen, while traveled back to Venice, and lost half of the amount. Szécsényi did not believe the story and reported him to the authorities of Padua, which arrested and imprisoned Pelsőci. According to the contract, Szécsényi and Pelsőci agreed that the latter one will repay his debt of 72 ducats (including litigation costs and Szécsényi's travel expenses to Padua) at 2 gold ducats per month. He had no financial problems at this time either, because he arrived in Padua with "an entourage befitting his dignity and status."

During his exile, Szécsényi maintained good relationship with many local intellectuals, including Giovanni Caldiera, a prominent physician and professor of physics, and Agostino Morosini. He also interacted with the local Hungarian community, most of whom were craftsmen. Historian Daniela Dvořáková considers Szécsényi lived on trade, while residing in Venice. For instance, just before his death, Szécsényi and one of his familiares, a certain Vincent traveled on business on the board of merchant galley Contarena from Constantinople, bringing clothes from there and Euboea. At the beginning of 1438, when he returned on the galley to Venice, Szécsényi was already seriously ill. A cover letter to his last will says he suffered from "pestilential fever". After the treatments did not help, Nicholas Szécsényi made his last will and testament on 18 January 1438 in his palace at the Rialto. He was confessed by the local priest Francesco Quarterio. According to the document, he died on the following day, on 19 January. Documents of the State Archives of Venice preserved that Szécsényi and his staff lived in a rented house in the parish of Holy Trinity, then in the parish of St. Simon, where he died. According to his last will, which was drafted by chaplain and notary public Giovanni Rizzo, Szécsényi was buried in the San Pietro di Castello on 20 January.

Entrusting his four Venetian friends – doctors John Caldiera, Pietro Tomasini, and trader Alessandro Bono and his son Mosè Bono – with the execution, Szécsényi, who died unmarried and childless, made his relative Ladislaus Szécsényi as heir of his virtually existed fortune (as considered himself to be their owner), leaving his all castles, towns and villages in Hungary to him, except Szakall, which he donated to the local Benedictine monastery, which had to be re-established. The St. Ladislaus parish church of Szécsény was granted five villages in Hont and Nógrád counties, while his nephew Ladislaus Losonci inherited his houses at Buda, which situated directly opposite to the Fresh Palace. According to his last testament, Szécsényi did not suffer from a shortage during exile. At the time of his death, he had two familiares (Michael and Vincent) and six slaves, for whom he also took care of. However, as later documents preserved, both familiares robbed their former master after his death, despite rewarding large amounts, clothes and armours etc. After the theft, Michael was murdered by one of his companions in Portogruaro. Szécsényi was left with several debtors in Hungary and Croatia, the executors were unable to collect the debts, though they sent many couriers, and Pietro Tomasini and Alessandro Bono even personally visited one of them in his castle in Senj. Many of Nicholas's chattels (weapons, clothes, armor, jewelry) were auctioned and sold. Szécsényi also possessed state bonds and cash obtained by pawning jewelry to Jews of Mestre.

== Reputation ==
Historian Pál Engel, who wrote the first study about Szécsényi's life and hardships, considered he was condemned on the basis of false accusations. Szécsényi assured his heir in the document, he will not die as a result of poisoning, but "God brought me, and I accept this with peacefulness". Engel argued the contemporaries considered him a villain, but the relatives most immediately affected in the two cases – Ladislaus Szécsényi and the nephew and heir of his allegedly murdered uncle Ladislaus Garai, later Palatine of Hungary – did not believe the charges. Both retained their ties with the exiled Nicholas Szécsényi until his death, and supported him financially. In contrast, Daniela Dvořáková emphasizes Garai was in debt to Szécsényi, and was reluctant to pay. After Szécsényi's death, his last will's executors sent Garai various letters and personal messages to request payment of his debt, but all these attempts remained without any response. Péter E. Kovács lamented that Nicholas' last years in Venice is "the first well-documented emigration story" of a Hungarian national.

Engel, argued, the only rational explanation for his contemporaries' antipathy is that he differed from them in every respect. As his last will and testament proves, Szécsényi was a literate man, unlike other secular barons in the 15th century, in addition, he also wrote, including love letters (possibly to Hedwig, who spent his life in house custody at Garai's castle). The text also confirmed he had many books which the Catholic Church would be considered heretical and forbidden literature. According to Alexander Bono's catalogue, his library contained 138 manuscripts, which was extremely large, compared to contemporary libraries in Hungary (for instance, the chapter of Pressburg had only 83 manuscripts in 1425). Based on the 1424 charges of coin counterfeiting, Dvořáková considers whether his library included alchemical works. However Engel argued, Szécsényi was one of the richest landowners during his time, an act of counterfeiting would have been totally unnecessary on his part. The historian assumed, in fact, Szécsényi collected Ancient coins as a forerunner of the Humanist statesmen and thinkers. E. Kovács argued that Szécsényi "must have had an open, receptive personality, and the little wealth he brought with him may have helped him through the initial difficulties".

Further documents were discovered by Martin Štefánik in the Venetian archives, written in mostly Italian dialect, which suggest, in addition to being educated, Szécsényi was "frivolous and pleasure-seeking man, who was more like a Renaissance cavalier and adventurer [...], rather than a medieval Christian knight", according to Dvořáková. Much of the wealth and money, on which Szécsényi counted, proved to be a fiction. One of the executors wrote his deceased friend was "extremely careless with money". As Szécsényi mentioned his female slaves more extensively than others in his last testament, Dvořáková argues it confirms the justification for the accusations about his uncommitted sexual life, which confronted with the common practice of moral norms in Hungary. The executors' reported the female slaves – namely, Novella, Polissena, Adriana, Armellina and Giulia – were unbaptized and did not speak Italian, and served their master as his concubines. Szécsényi's friends made lot of effort to find husbands for them, in accordance with his will.

== Sources ==
- Bárány, Attila (2004). "Zsigmond király 1416-os angliai kísérete [The Entourage of King Sigismund in his 1416 England Visit]". Aetas (in Hungarian). 19 (3–4): 5–30. ISSN 0237-7934.
- Dvořáková, Daniela (2012). "Nicholas of Szécsény and Salgó – an exceptional man at the court of Sigismund of Luxembourg (A contribution to the court culture and functioning of the court of the King of Hungary at the beginning of the 15th century)". Historický časopis. 60 (Supplement): 3–18.
- E. Kovács, Péter (2024). "Szívet cserél, aki hazát cserél? Salgai Miklós Velencében [Does He Who Changes his Country Change his Heart? Miklós Salgai in Venice]". Történelmi Szemle (in Hungarian). 66 (3). Hungarian Academy of Sciences: 321–358. ISSN 0040-9634.
- Engel, Pál (1992). "Salgai Miklós [Nicholas of Salgó]". Levéltári Közlemények (in Hungarian). 63 (1–2). National Archives of Hungary: 15–26. ISSN 0024-1512.
- Engel, Pál (1996). Magyarország világi archontológiája, 1301–1457, I. [Secular Archontology of Hungary, 1301–1457, Volume I] (in Hungarian). História, MTA Történettudományi Intézete. ISBN 963-8312-44-0.
