= Order of the Dragon =

Renaissance-era European chivalric order

- Societas Draconistarum
- Active: 1408–16th century
- Countries: Kingdom of Hungary; Kingdom of Croatia; Holy Roman Empire; Wallachia; Moldavia; Crown of Aragon; Serbian Despotate; League of Lezhë; Second Bulgarian Empire; Grand Duchy of Lithuania
- Allegiance: Holy Roman Empire; Holy See
- Type: Order of chivalry
- Patron: Emperor Sigismund and Empress Barbara

The Order of the Dragon (Latin: Societas Draconistarum, literally "Society of the Dragonists") was a monarchical chivalric order only for selected higher aristocracy and monarchs, founded in 1408 by Sigismund of Luxembourg, who was then King of Hungary and Croatia (r. 1387–1437) and later also Holy Roman Emperor (r. 1433–1437). It was fashioned after the military orders of the Crusades, requiring its initiates to defend the cross and fight the enemies of Christianity, particularly the Ottoman Empire.

The Order flourished during the first half of the 15th century, primarily in Germany and Italy. After Sigismund's death in 1437, its importance declined in Western Europe. However, after the Fall of Constantinople in 1453, it continued to play a role in Hungary, Serbia and Romania, which bore the brunt of the Ottoman incursions. The Prince of Wallachia Vlad II Dracul, the father of Vlad the Impaler, took his name from the Order of the Dragon, also known as Ordinul Dragonului.

== Historical background ==
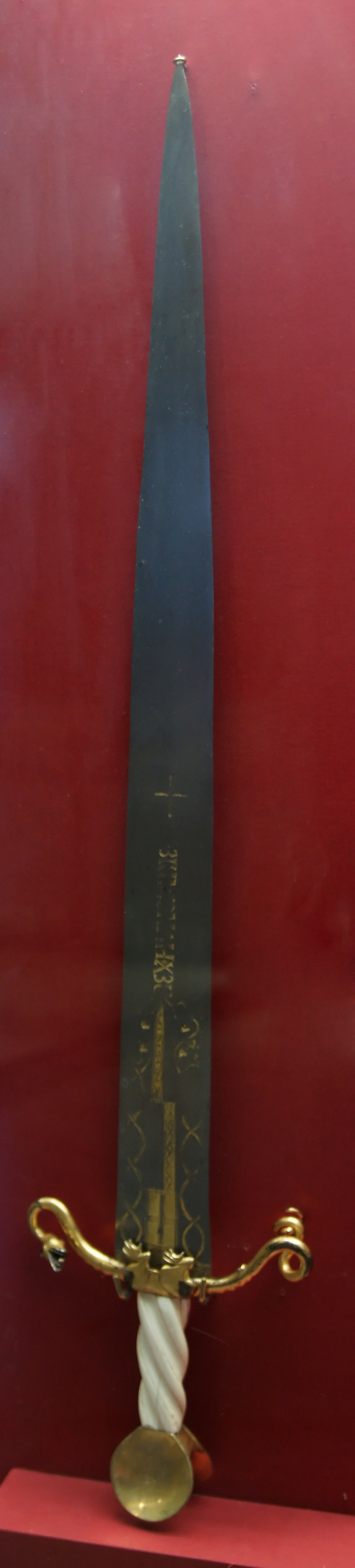
Ceremonial sword of the Order, c. 1433, displayed at the Neue Burg, Vienna.

Sigismund faced fierce struggles for power leading up to the foundation of the order in 1408. In 1387, the Bohemian royal son Sigismund of Luxembourg was elected King of Hungary and Croatia, a title which he owed chiefly to his marriage to Queen Mary of Hungary in 1385. During the next decade, he constantly sought support or employed ruthless methods to strengthen his unsteady hold on the throne. His rule was weakened in 1395 when Mary, who was pregnant, died in a horse riding accident. In 1389, the Ottoman Sultan Murad I fought Lazar, Prince of Serbia at the Battle of Kosovo Polje, in which both leaders died, leading to an uncertain outcome of the battle. Two years later, the Turks had taken the Bulgarian fortress of Nicopolis.

In 1396, Pope Boniface IX proclaimed a crusade against the Ottomans, and a campaign was organised to liberate Bulgaria from the Turks, save Constantinople, and put a halt to the Ottoman expansion. Sigismund was nominally in charge; however, in the 1396 Battle of Nicopolis the French leader, John of Nevers, commanded the French half of the forces and ignored Sigismund's entreaties by charging the Turks. About 12,000 crusaders died with only a few leaders, including Sigismund, escaping. Sigismund returned to Hungary in 1401 and, facing a number of revolts, gradually resumed control and re-asserted himself as the King of Hungary. This was achieved by allying himself with the political party of Stibor of Stiboricz, Nicholas II Garay, and Hermann II of Celje, in return for their military support, which enabled him to fight off domestic rivals. Sigismund campaigned against the Croatian nobility in Slavonia, but the brunt of the campaign was directed at Bosnians and their nobility south of the Sava which culminated in 1408 with the Battle of Dobor in Usora. In the aftermath of this battle, and events unfolding in what is known as the Bloody Sabor of Križevci, 171 members of Bosnian nobility were also massacred. His pact with Hermann II was secured in 1408, when Sigismund married Herman II's daughter Barbara.

== Foundation and purpose ==
On December 12, 1408, Sigismund and his queen, Barbara von Cilli, founded the league known today as the Order of the Dragon. Its statutes, written in Latin, call it a society (societas) whose members carry the signum draconis (see below), but assign no name to it. Contemporary records, however, refer to the order by a variety of similar if unofficial names, such as Gesellschaft mit dem Drachen, Divisa seu Societas Draconica, Ordinurului de Dracul, Societas Draconica seu Draconistarum, and Fraternitas Draconum. It was to some extent modelled after the earlier Hungarian monarchical order, the Order of St. George (Societas militae Sancti Georgii), founded by King Charles I of Hungary in 1318, the grandfather of Sigismund's first wife Mary. The order adopted Saint George as its patron saint, whose legendary defeat of a dragon was used as a symbol for the military and religious ethos of the order.

The aim of the order was to fight the Ottoman Empire, defend the Hungarian monarchy from foreign and domestic enemies, and the Catholic Church from heretics and pagans. It also included foreigners (and non-Catholics), such as the Orthodox Serbian ruler Stefan Lazarević, northerns and the Wallachian rulers.

The primary representatives of "the perfidious Enemy" remained the Ottoman Turks, who continued to be a problem for Sigismund's successors. The Order's outward focus on foreign threats was also aimed at achieving a level of domestic cohesion. The statutes go on to describe the order's symbols of the ouroboros and the red cross, which were worn by its members and gave the order its corporate identity (see below). They also list the mutual obligations of the king and his nobles. The members were to swear loyalty to the king, queen, and their future sons and to protect the royal interests. Boulton argues that "the Society of the Dragon was clearly intended to serve [...] as the institutional embodiment of the royal faction its founder had created". In return for their services, the nobles could expect to enjoy royal protection, honors, and offices.

The creation of the order was an instance within a larger fashion of founding chivalric orders during the 14th and early 15th centuries, not infrequently dedicated to organizing "crusades", especially after the disaster of the Battle of Nicopolis (1396). Sigismund's order was particularly inspired from the Order of Saint George of 1326. Another influential model may have been the Sicilian Order of the Ship, founded in 1381.

The statute of the Order, which was expanded by Bishop Eberhard of Nagyvárad, chancellor of Sigismund's court, survives only in a copy made in 1707, which was published in an edition in 1841. The prologue to these statutes of 1408 reports that the society was created:

in company with the prelates, barons, and magnates of our kingdom, whom we invite to participate with us in this party, by reason of the sign and effigy of our pure inclination and intention to crush the pernicious deeds of the same perfidious Enemy, and of the followers of the ancient Dragon, and (as one would expect) of the pagan knights, schismatics, and other nations of the Orthodox faith, and those envious of the Cross of Christ, and of our kingdoms, and of his holy and saving religion of faith, under the banner of the triumphant Cross of Christ...

== Symbol and other artifacts ==
Reconstruction of the order patch (I) based on existing Austrian museum artifacts.

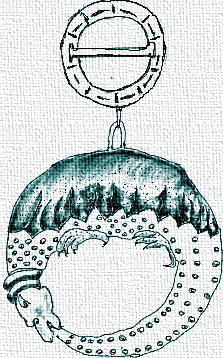
Reconstruction of the emblem (II) based on the sketches in Austrian Museum custody; the original badge is missing.

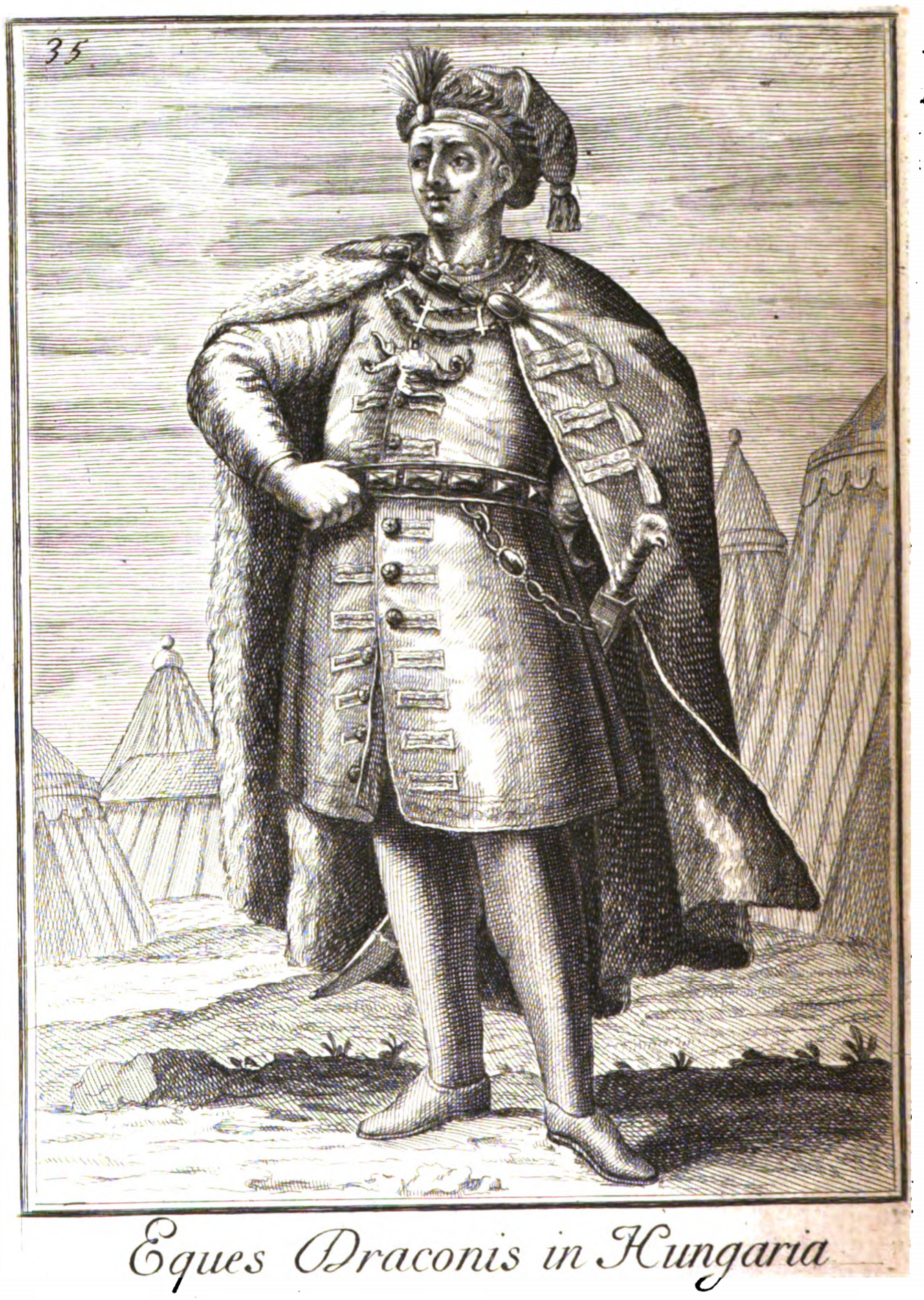
Engraving from 1724

The edict of 1408 describes two insignia to be worn by members of the Order:

...we and the faithful barons and magnates of our kingdom shall bear and have, and do choose and agree to wear and bear, in the manner of society, the sign or effigy of the Dragon incurved into the form of a circle, its tail winding around its neck, divided through the middle of its back along its length from the top of its head right to the tip of its tail, with blood [forming] a red cross flowing out into the interior of the cleft by a white crack, untouched by blood, just as and in the same way that those who fight under the banner of the glorious martyr St George are accustomed to bear a red cross on a white field...

The dragon described here, with its tail coiled around its neck, bears comparison to the ouroboros. On the back of the dragon, from the base of the neck to the tail, is the Red Cross of Saint George, with the entire image on an argent field. The Order's dragon emblem has not survived in any original form, but it has been referenced on coins, art, and in writing. An embroidered badge from c.1430 is found at the Bavarian National Museum.

A University of Bucharest annotation to the original edict reads "O Quam Misericors est Deus, Pius et Justus" (O how merciful is God, faithful and just), which may have been officially part of the emblem. The various classes of the order had a slight variation of the dragon symbol. Common changes included the addition of inscriptions like O Quam Misericors est Deus ("Oh, how merciful is God") and "Justus et Paciens" ("Just and patient"). One of the highest classes may have worn a necklace with a seal, while a period painting of Oswald von Wolkenstein depicts another type of class variation.

Few historical artifacts of the Order now remain. A copy, dating to 1707, of the statutes of 1408 is the oldest known literary artifact of the society.

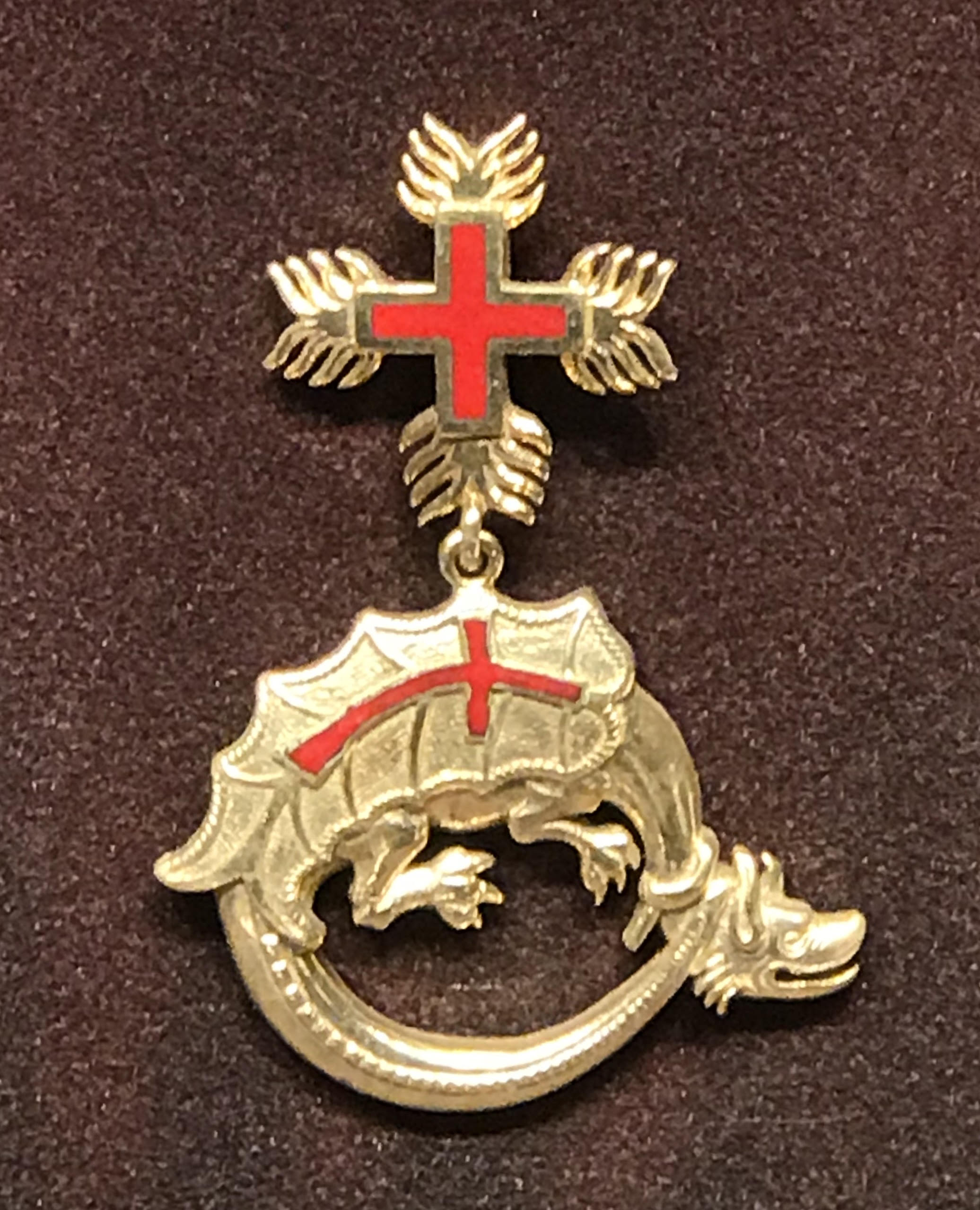
Order of the Dragon. Reconstruction in Trakai Island Castle museum, Lithuania.

== Membership ==
Coat of arms of Elizabeth Báthory (1560 – 1614) inspired by symbols of the Order of the Dragon.

Members of the order are referred to in the statutes as barons (barones, occasionally socii). They were mostly Sigismund's political allies and supporters, who were at first largely confined to the political factions of Stefan Lazarević, Nicholas II Garai, and Hermann II of Celje, including such magnates as Stibor of Stiboricz and Pippo Spano. The initial group of inductees for Sigismund's Order numbered 21 men, which extended to about 24 in 1418.

After some time, Sigismund chose to expand the ranks of the Order. A second group of inductees was initiated between 1431 and 1437. As membership grew, the Order of the Dragon came to have two degrees. There was a superior class, which between 1408 and 1418 wore both the dragon and the cross as the Order's emblem and a more elaborate version afterwards. The second degree had a large number of members, and its symbol was only the dragon.

Following Sigismund's death in 1437, the Order lost prominence. However, the prestigious emblem of the Order was retained on the coat of arms of several Hungarian noble families, including Báthory, Bocskai, Bethlen, Szathmáry, Benyovszky, Kende and Rákóczi.

=== Founding members ===
The 21 original members of the Order of the Dragon were enumerated in the 1408 founding charters. These were, in original order and Latin description:

- Stephanus despoth, dominus Serbiae, item

Stefan Lazarević (1374–1427), Serbian Prince (1389–1402) and Despot (1402–1427).

Coat of arms of Serbian despot Stefan Lazarević with dragon around Nemanjić dynasty coat of arms

- Hermannus comes Cily et Zagoriae,

Hermann II (1360s–1435), Count of Celje, Styrian prince and magnate, father of the Hungarian Queen consort Barbara of Cilli, most notable as the faithful supporter and father-in-law of the Hungarian king Sigismund of Luxembourg, Ban of Croatia and Ban of Slavonia (1406–1407).

- comes Fredericus, filius eiusdem,

Frederick II (1379–1454), Count of Celje, son of Hermann II.

- Nicolaus de gara, regni Hungariae palatinus,

Nicholas II Garai (c. 1367–1433), Hungarian baron, Ban of Croatia (1395–1397), Ban of Slavonia (1397–1401), Palatine of Hungary (1402–1433).

- Stiborius de Stiboricz alias vaiuoda Transyluanus,

Stibor of Stiboricz of Ostoja (c. 1348–1414), aristocrat of Polish origin in the Kingdom of Hungary, Voivode of Transylvania (1395–1401, 1409–1414), also ispán of Arad and Szolnok Counties (1395–1401), ispán of Szolnok County (1409–1414), Nyitra and Trencsén Counties, Lord of all Váh.

- Joannes filius Henrici de Thamassy et

John Tamási, Hungarian nobleman, Voivode of Transylvania (1403–1409), Master of the doorkeepers (1409–1416), also ispán of Szolnok County (1403–1409).

- Jacobus Laczk de Zantho, vaiuodae Transyluani,

James Lack of Szántó, Hungarian nobleman, Voivode of Transylvania (1403–1409).

- Joannes de Maroth Machouiensis,

John Maróti (c. 1366–1434), Hungarian nobleman, Ban of Macsó (1397, 1398–1402, 1402–1410, 1427–1448), Count of the Székelys (1397–1398), also ispán of Bács, Baranya, Bodrog, Syrmia, Tolna and Valkó Counties.

- Pipo de Ozora Zewreniensis, bani;

Pippo Spano (1369–1426), Italian magnate, general, strategist and confidant of King Sigismund of Hungary, Ban of Severin, also ispán of Temes, Csanád, Arad, Krassó, Keve Counties (1404–1426), Csongrád and Fejér Counties (1407–1426), also ispán of the chamber of salt (1400–1426), Royal treasurer (1407–1408).

- Nicolaus de Zeech magister tauernicorum regalium,

Nicholas II Szécsi, Hungarian nobleman from the influential House of Szécsi, Royal treasurer (1397), also ispán of Zala County (1402), secular gubernator of the Roman Catholic Diocese of Veszprém (1403–1405), master of the doorkeepers for the Queen (1406–1409), Master of the treasury (1408–1410), also ispán of Vas County (1406–1419), Sopron County (1406–1410).

- comes Karolus de Corbauia, supremus thesaurarius regius,

Charles, Count of Krbava, Croatian nobleman, Ban of Croatia (1408–1409), Royal treasurer (1408–1409), castellan of Visegrád (1403–1409).

- Symon filius condam Konye bani de Zecheen, janitorum,

Simon Szécsényi, Hungarian baron and military leader from the influential Szécsényi family, a staunch supporter of King Sigismund of Hungary since the 1380s, Master of the doorkeepers (1403–1409), Judge royal (1395–1412), also ispán of Sáros (1403–1405), Szepes (1404), Borsod (1404–1405) and Heves (1405) Counties.

- comes Joannes de Corbauia, dapiferorum,

John, Count of Krbava, Croatian nobleman, Master of the stewards (1406–1419).

- Joannes filius Georgii de Alsaan pincernarum,

John Alsáni, Master of the cupbearers.

- Petrus Cheh de Lewa aganzonum regalium magistri,

Peter Cseh de Léva, Master of the horse, Voivode of Transylvania (1436–1438), also ispán of Bács, Baranya, Bars, Bodrog, Syrmia, Tolna and Valkó Counties.

- Nicolaus de Chak, alias vaiuoda Transyluanus,

Nicolaus Csáki, Hungarian nobleman, Voivode of Transylvania (1402–1403, 1415–1426), also ispán of Békés, Bihar, Csanád, Csongrád, Keve, Krassó, Szolnok, Temes, and Zaránd Counties (1402–1403), ispán of Békés, Bihar, and Szolnok Counties (1415–1426).

- Paulus Byssenus, alter Paulus de Peth, pridem Dalmatiae, Croatiae et totius Sclauoniae regnorum bani,

Paul Besenyő and Paul Pécsi, Hungarian noblemen, Ban of Dalmatia, Ban of Croatia, Ban of Slavonia (1404–1406).

- Michael, filius Salamonis de Nadasd comes siculorum regalium,

Michael Nádasdi, Hungarian nobleman, Count of the Székelys (1405–1422).

- Petrus de Peren, alias siculorum nunc vero maramorossensis comes,

Peter Perényi, Hungarian nobleman, Count of the Székelys (1397–1401), Ban of Macsó (1397, 1400–1401), Judge royal (1415–1423), also ispán of Ung (1398–1423), Máramaros (1404–1412), Szatmár and Ugocsa (1406–1419) Counties.

- Emericus de eadem Pern secretarius cancellarius regius

Emeric Perényi, Hungarian nobleman, important diplomat King Sigismund of Hungary, Secret chancellor, also ispán of Abaúj and Borsod.

- et Joannes filius condam domini Nicolai de Gara palatini.

John Garai, nobleman from the Hungarian-Croatian Garai family, son of Nicholas I Garai, and brother of Nicholas II Garai, the Palatine branch of the family.

=== Other members ===
- Stibor de Beckov or Stibor II, son of Stibor of Stiboricz
- Albert Nagymihályi, Ban of Croatia and Prior of Vrana
- Hrvoje Vukčić Hrvatinić (ca. 1350–1416), Grand Duke of Bosnia
- Vuk Lazarević, brother of Despot Stefan Lazarević, received the title from Sigismund.
- Fruzhin, Bulgarian prince, son of Tsar Ivan Shishman of Bulgaria.
- Vlad II Dracul (d. 1447), then Prince of Wallachia
- Vlad III Dracul (d.1477) then prince of Wallachia
- Benjamin de Benyó, Voivod of Liptov.
- Oswald von Wolkenstein (d. 1445)
- Vladislas II of Bohemia and Hungary (1456–1516)
- Foreign allies, who did not swear an oath of loyalty:
  - King Ladislaus II of Poland, Sigismund's former brother-in-law
  - Grand Duke Vytautas of Lithuania,
  - King Henry V of England
  - members of Italian families, such as the Carrara, della Scala, Useppi, and leaders of Venezia, Padova and Verona
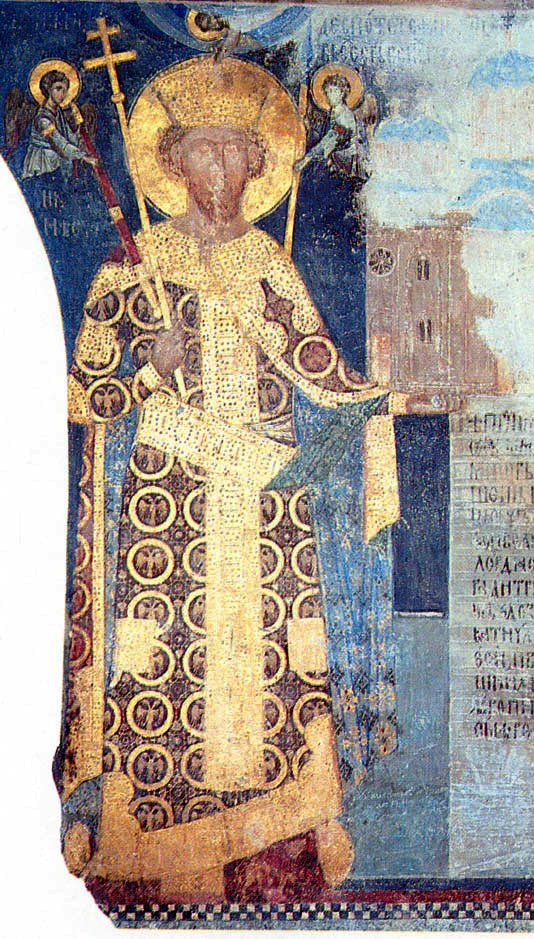
Stefan Lazarević, Prince of Serbia

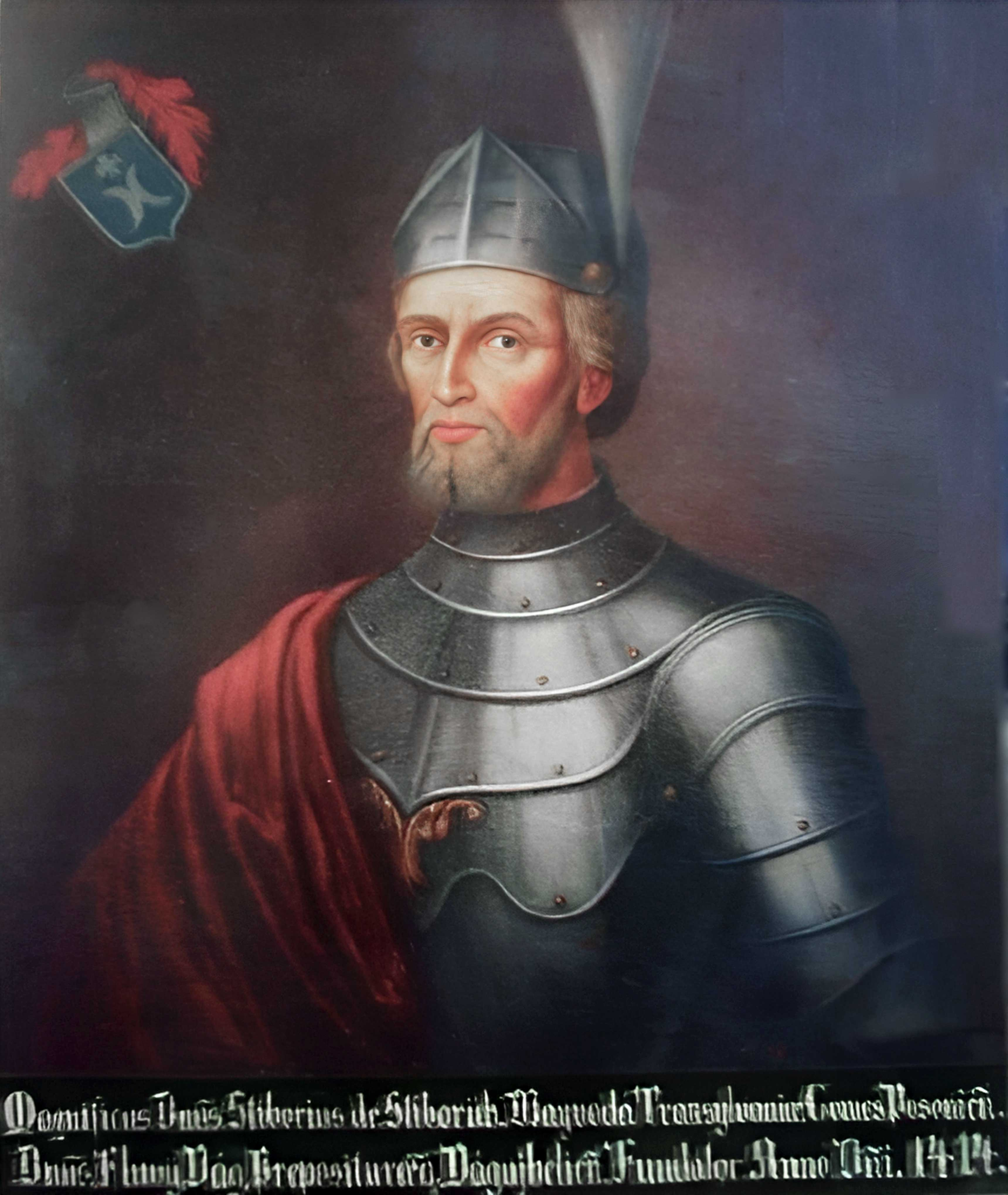
Stibor of Stiboricz

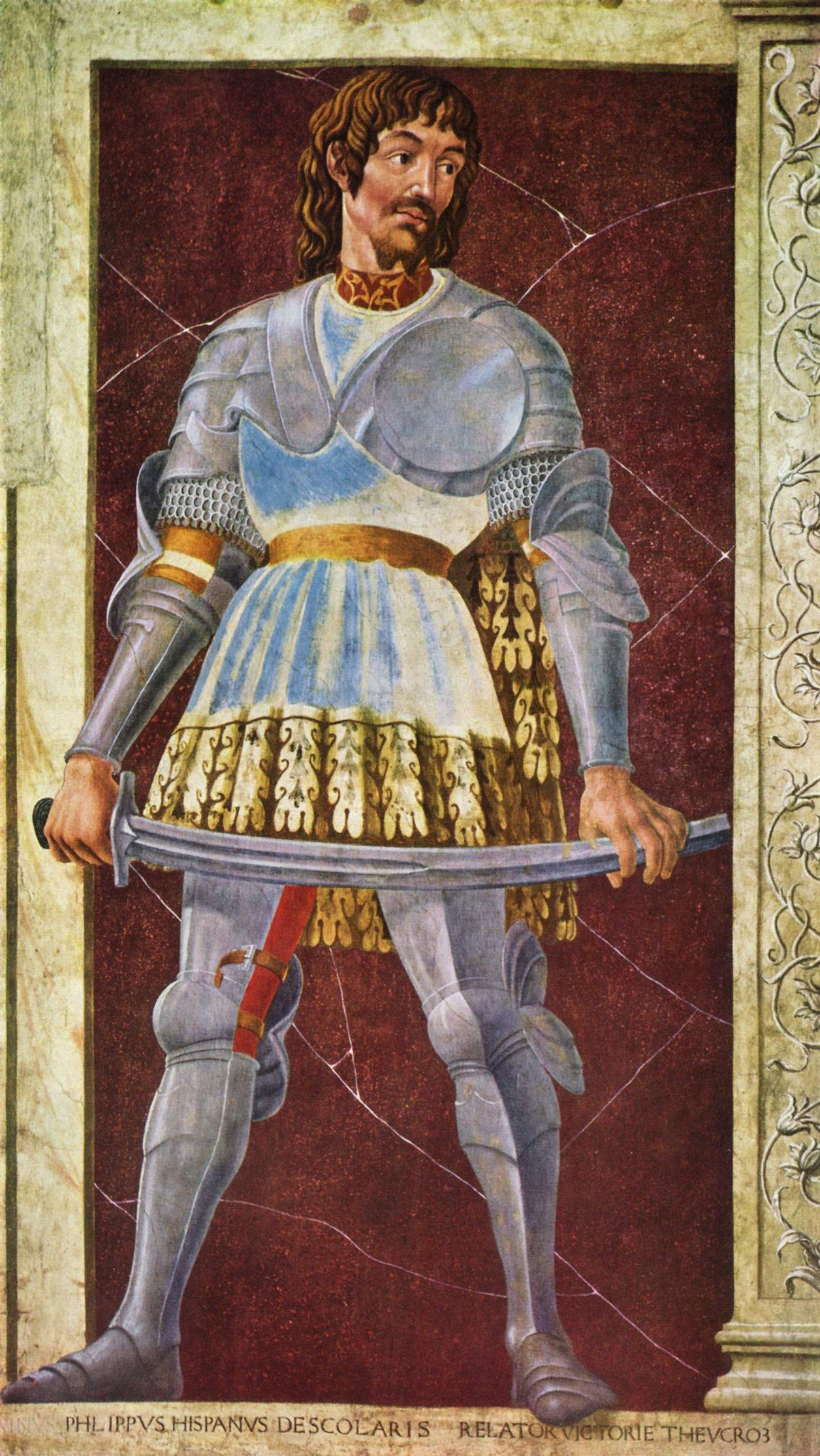
Pippo Spano, fresco by Andrea del Castagno

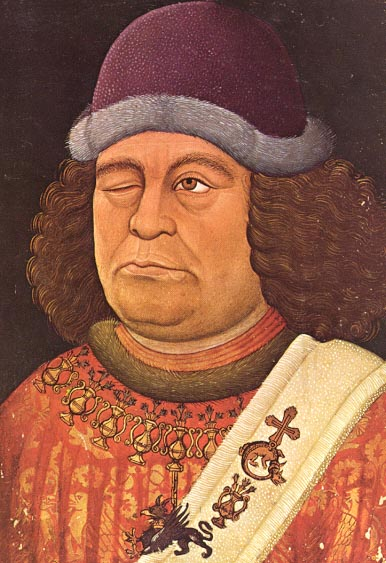
Oswald von Wolkenstein—portrait from the Innsbrucker Handschrift, 1432—wearing the Order of the Dragon chain

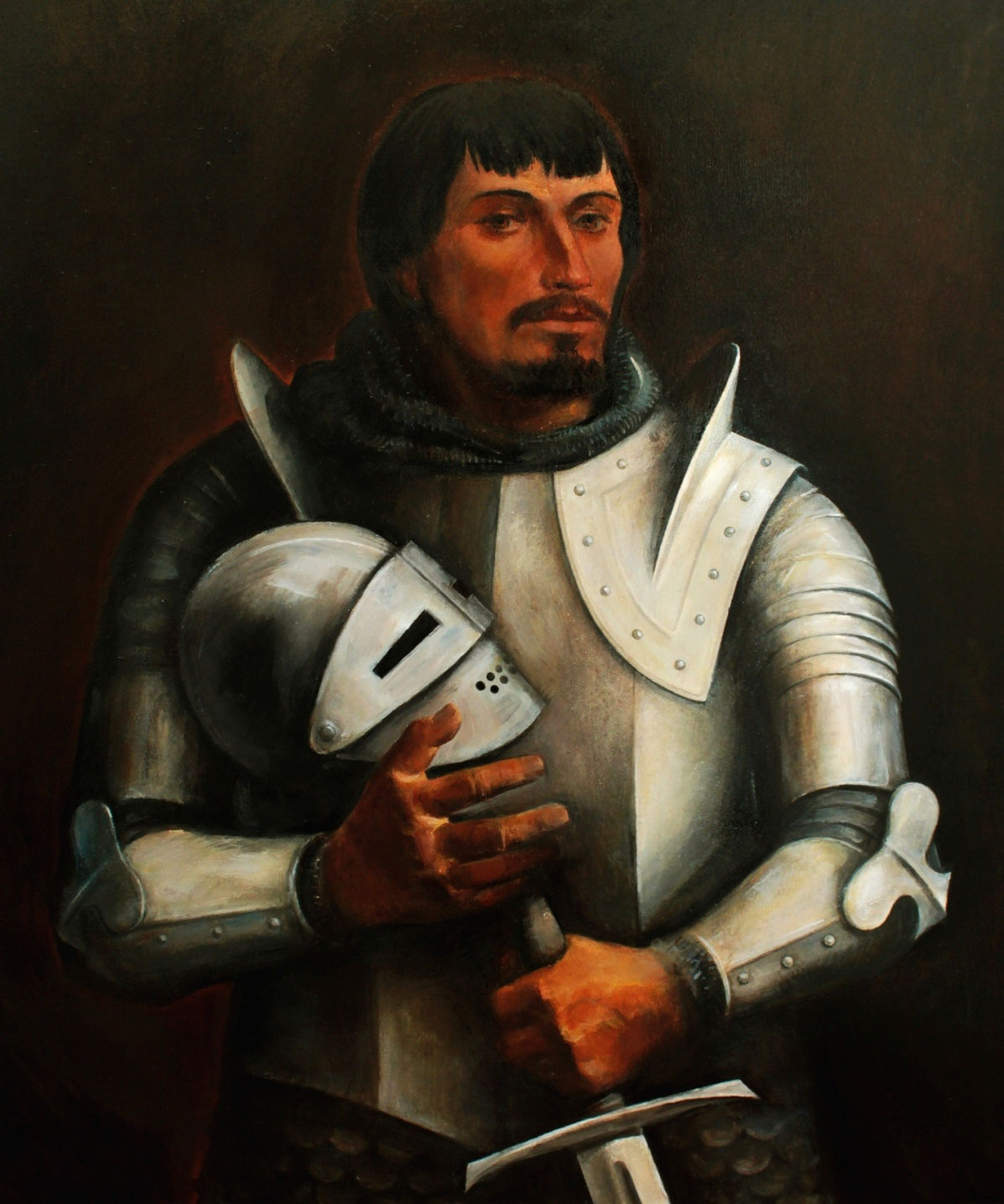
Fruzhin, Prince of Bulgaria

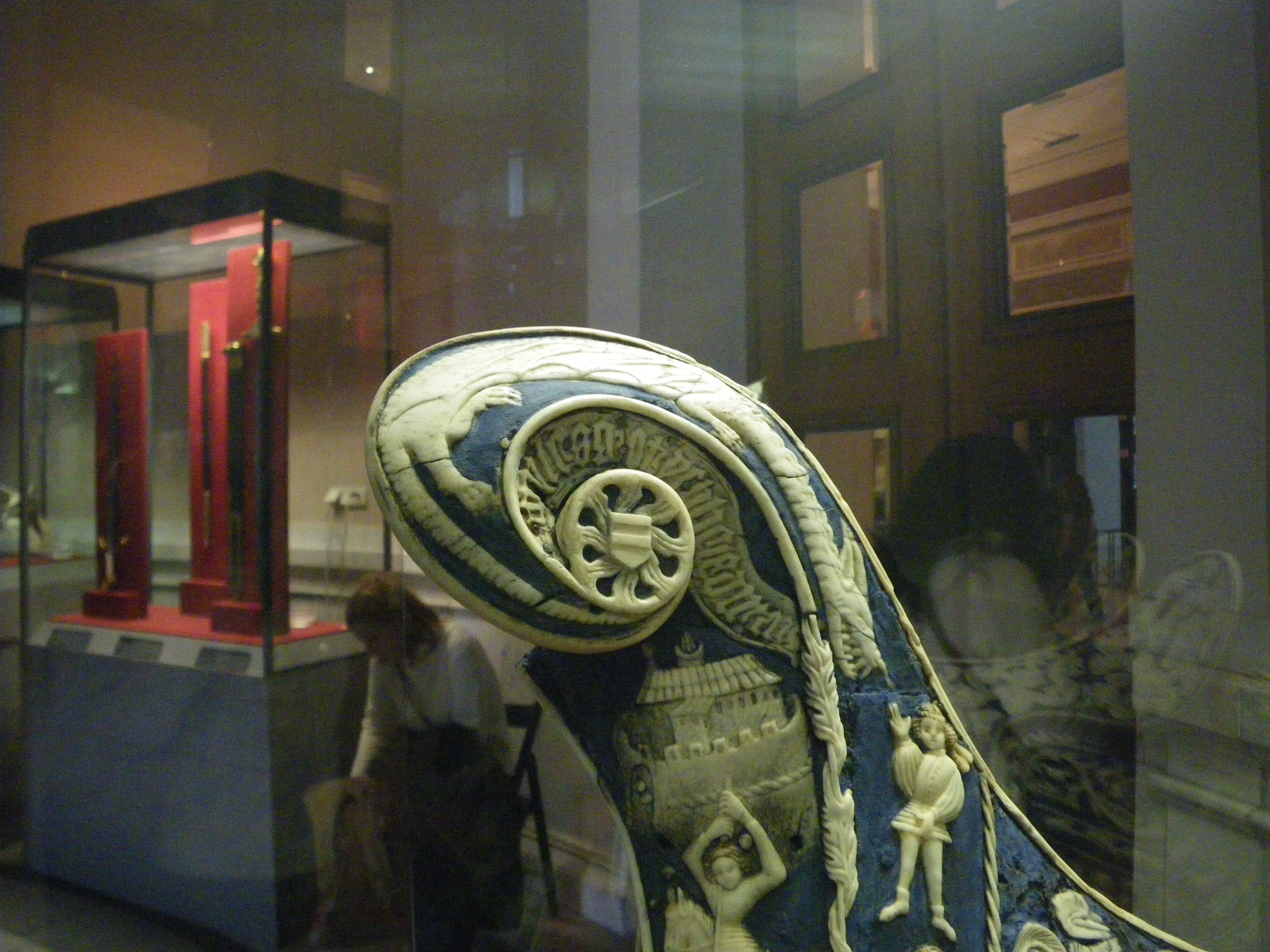
Order of the Dragon on a medieval saddle

== In popular culture ==
- Order of the Dragon is featured in Age of Empires IV as a playable civilization.
- A fictionalised version of the Order of the Dragon features in Elizabeth Kostova's 2005 novel, The Historian.
- A film sharing the same name is set to be released in 2026.

== See also ==
- Order of the Four Emperors
