= Simon Szécsényi =

Hungarian baron (died 1412)

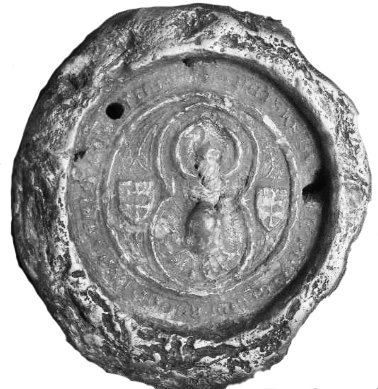
- Seal of Judge royal Simon Szécsényi

Judge royal
- Reign: 1395
- Predecessor: John Kaplai
- Successor: John Pásztói
- Died: c. 29 January 1412
- Noble family: House of Szécsényi
- Spouse: Elizabeth Garai
- Issue: Nicholas II; Thomas II; Dorothea
- Father: Kónya Szécsényi
- Mother: Elizabeth Haschendorfer

Simon Szécsényi (Hungarian: Szécsényi Simon; died c. 29 January 1412), was a Hungarian baron and military leader, who was a staunch supporter of King Sigismund of Luxembourg since the 1380s. Joining a magnate conspiracy in 1401, he played a key role in the arrest of the king, but later was pardoned and retained his political influence until his death.

== Family ==
Simon was born into the influential Szécsényi family as one of the three sons of Kónya Szécsényi, Ban of Croatia and Elizabeth Haschendorfer, a daughter of Austrian noble Wulfing Haschendorfer from Haschendorf/Hasfalva (today part of Neckenmarkt in Austria). His brothers were Frank, also a baron and his closest political ally, and Nicholas I. The Szécsényi family originated from the Kacsics clan. Simon's grandfather was Thomas I Szécsényi, who rose to prominence during King Charles I's war against the oligarchs and received numerous grants of land thereafter.

Indicating the social status of his family, Simon Szécsényi married Elizabeth Garai, the daughter of Nicholas I Garai, Palatine of Hungary, who was one of the leading magnates of King Louis I of Hungary, then Mary, Queen of Hungary. Through the marriage, Simon became relative to numerous baronial families. Simon and Elizabeth had three children. The eldest one was Nicholas II, who lost all of his fortune after a conspiracy and show trial against him, and died in exile in the Republic of Venice. The second son Thomas II was mentioned only once in sources in 1407. Their only daughter Dorothea married Sigismund Losonci, who governed the Banate of Severin with the titles of captain of several castles in 1420. Simon's branch became extinct after a generation.

== Career ==
He first appeared in contemporary documents in 1373. The Szécsényi brothers were one of the earliest domestic partisans of Sigismund of Luxembourg, who arrived to Hungary to validate the marriage agreement with Queen Mary. After the coronation of Sigismund as co-ruler in March 1387, the Széchenyis belonged to the most influential barons after the king's foreign-origin courtiers. In 1388, Simon bought the royal castle of Salgó (Börzsöny) in Hont County and its surrounding eight villages from Sigismund. In the same time, he was appointed ispán of Hont (along with his brother Frank) and Trencsén Counties, holding both positions simultaneously until 1390. In 1389, Frank and Simon Szécsényi participated in the military campaign to Serbia, which took place after the Battle of Kosovo. Both of them had been involved in the successful sieges of Borač and Čestin forts.

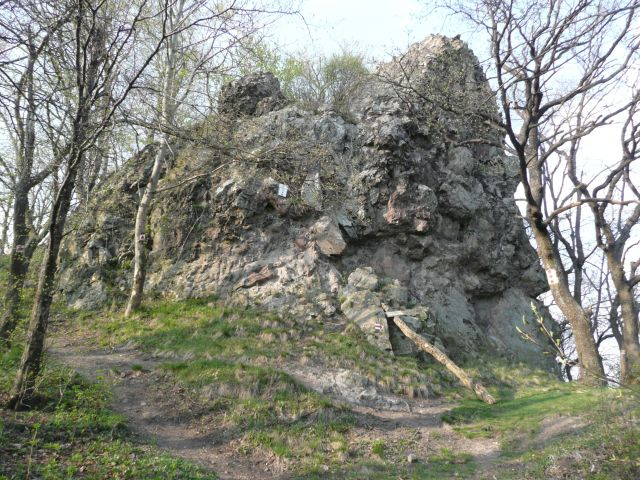
The ruins of Salgó Castle in Börzsöny

In order to counterbalance Voivode Ladislaus Losonci's power and influence in Transylvania, who turned against Sigismund and supported Ladislaus of Naples's claim to the Hungarian throne, Sigismund appointed Simon Szécsényi as Count of the Székelys around May 1390, ending the Bélteki brothers' continuous rule since 1387. At the same time, he also became ispán of Bihar County. In official documents, Szécsényi first appeared as count on 27 February 1391, when issued a diploma in Gyulafehérvár (today Alba Iulia, Romania). He urged the Székely noble elite of Marosszék seat to pay the ispán's remuneration. However Szécsényi held the dignity for less than a year. On 28 March 1391, Sigismund informed his subjects in Görgény Castle (today Gurghiu in Romania) that he dismissed Szécsényi as Count of the Székelys and appointed Stephen Kanizsai to replace him, "while maintaining all his fondness" for Szécsényi. This was one of the chapters of the Kanizsais' expansion, who dominated the royal court since Sigismund's coronation under the leadership of Archbishop John Kanizsai. Under such circumstances, Szécsényi joined the allegiance of the Lackfi family which gradually lost influence after the death of Louis I in 1382. Nevertheless, Szécsényi did not hold any dignity for the next four years.

Szécsényi gradually became a partisan of the Kanizsai League after that. For this reason, he successfully managed to become Judge royal in May 1395. As Sigismund prepared a war against the Ottoman Empire and its allies Wallachia and Moldavia since that year, which sparked into the so-called Crusade of Nicopolis, he was far away from the royal court for a long time. Thus Szécsényi acted as Judge royal in accordance with the will of barons and prelates, who were gradually confronted with Sigismund and his policy. On 17 November in that year, he was replaced by John Pásztói. After the disastrous defeat at Nicopolis, Szécsényi took an active in role in assassination of his former ally, the once powerful Stephen Lackfi, who was massacred by the followers of the Kanizsai League along with his kinship in the Bloody Sabor of Križevci on 27 February 1397.

In the upcoming years, the relationship increasingly worsened between the Hungarian barons (de facto led by Archbishop Kanizsai) and Sigismund, especially due to the latter's favoritism towards his foreign courtiers, such as Pipo of Ozora, Stibor of Stiboricz, Hermann II, Count of Celje and Bishop Eberhard Albeni. In 1401, Szécsényi participated in the magnate conspiracy against Sigismund. On 28 April, he led an armed group to the royal castle and demanded the "expulsion of Bohemians, Poles and other foreign courtiers". Sigismund refused the ultimatum and was thus captured and imprisoned in Visegrád, then Siklós. John Kanizsai as lord chancellor of the realm (corona regni) and the royal council took over the royal powers. The council appointed Szécsényi as Voivode of Transylvania, depriving Stibor of his office. The Garai family who kept the king under custody in Siklós, concluded a separate peace treaty with Sigismund, who was set free on 29 October 1401. The Kanizsais' victory proved to be pyrrhic and gradually lost their influence at the court. Szécsenyi, however, was able to retain his ascendancy due to his family relationship with the Garais through his marriage. The Siklós League, led by Nicholas II Garai (Szécsényi's brother-in-law) and Hermann of Celje, took the power over the royal court after the 1401 conspiracy. Szécsényi was standing by the king in 1403, when another baronial revolt broke out in favour of Ladislaus of Naples.

For his participation in the counterinsurgency, Szécsényi was made Master of the doorkeepers (thus also Marshal of the Royal Court), holding the office from 1403 to 1409 (there was a short interruption between July 1405 and January 1406, for unknown reasons). Beside that he was also ispán of Sáros (1403–1405), Szepes (1404), Borsod (1404–1405) and Heves (1405) Counties. Szécsényi was among the original founding members of the Order of the Dragon in 1408. His brother Frank died in that year, thus Simon remained the sole head of the family. Feeling the nearness of his death, he concluded an inheritance contract with his nephew Ladislaus (II) in the presence of Judge royal Simon Rozgonyi on 9 December 1411 in Letkés. Accordingly, his son Nicholas would be the sole heir of Salgó Castle, which was acquired by Simon decades earlier, while Tapolcsány (today Topoľčany, Slovakia) belonged to Frank's branch. Hollókő and Ajnácskő (today Hajnáčka, Slovakia) were classified to Ladislaus (Frank's son) and Nicholas (Simon's son), respectively, while those accessaries (villages and lands) were shared between the two branches. The remaining two castles (Somoskő and Bene) and the surrounding villages became a joint family property, while both branches had to appoint an own castellan, simultaneously. According to a charter dated 29 January 1412, Simon Szécsényi died around that time.

== Sources ==
- Bertényi, Iván (1976). Az országbírói intézmény története a XIV. században [History of the Institution of Judge Royal in the 14th Century] (in Hungarian). Hungarian Academy of Sciences. ISBN 963-05-0734-X.
- Engel, Pál (1992). "Salgai Miklós [Nicholas of Salgó]". Levéltári Közlemények. 63 (1–2). National Archives of Hungary: 15–26.
- Engel, Pál (1996). Magyarország világi archontológiája, 1301–1457, I. [Secular Archontology of Hungary, 1301–1457, Volume I] (in Hungarian). História, MTA Történettudományi Intézete. ISBN 963-8312-44-0.
- Kordé, Zoltán (2004). "A székelyispáni méltóság a Zsigmond-korban [The Dignity of Count of the Székelys During the Sigismund Era]". Történelmi Szemle (in Hungarian). 46 (3–4). Hungarian Academy of Sciences: 193–239. ISSN 0040-9634.
- Mályusz, Elemér (1984). Zsigmond király uralma Magyarországon, 1387–1437 [The Rule of King Sigismund in Hungary, 1387–1437] (in Hungarian). Gondolat. ISBN 963-281-414-2.
- Markó, László (2006). A magyar állam főméltóságai Szent Istvántól napjainkig: Életrajzi Lexikon [Great Officers of State in Hungary from King Saint Stephen to Our Days: A Biographical Encyclopedia] (in Hungarian). Helikon Kiadó. ISBN 963-208-970-7.

Simon House of Szécsényi Born: ? Died: January 1412
Political offices
Preceded by John Bélteki	Count of the Székelys; 1390–1391	Succeeded by Stephen Kanizsai
Preceded by John Kaplai	Judge royal 1395	Succeeded by John Pásztói
Preceded by Stibor of Stiboricz	Voivode of Transylvania; 1401	Succeeded by Nicholas Csáki & Nicholas Marcali
Preceded by Stephen Kanizsai	Master of the doorkeepers 1403–1405; 1406–1409	Succeeded by John Tamási
