= Dorothy Garai =

Queen consort of Bosnia
- Tenure: August 1428 – September 1438
- Born: 1410s
- Died: 19–24 September 1438
- Spouse: Tvrtko II of Bosnia
- House: House of Garai
- Father: John Garai
- Mother: Hedwig of Masovia
- Religion: Roman Catholic

Dorothy Garai (Serbo-Croatian: Doroteja Gorjanska/Доротеја Горјанска, Hungarian: Garai Dorottya; died between 19 and 24 September 1438) was a Hungarian noblewoman who became Queen of Bosnia upon her marriage to King Tvrtko II in 1428. She functioned as art patron and exerted significant influence over her husband, especially over his relations with church officials, which earned her considerable notoriety in monastic circles. The marriage was harmonious, but childless and cut short by her death in her twenties.

== Background ==
Dorothea was born into the House of Garai, an extremely powerful noble family of the Kingdom of Hungary. She was one of the daughters of John Garai, ispán (count) of the Temes County and ban (governor) of the Bosnian region of Usora. Nicholas I and Nicholas II Garai, Dorothea's grandfather and uncle respectively, served as palatines of Hungary, the highest-ranking officials in the kingdom. Her mother was Hedwig, daughter of Siemowit IV, Duke of Masovia. Dorothy may have been familiar with the Hungarian royal court due to family connections, her uncle being King Sigismund's palatine and brother-in-law.

Dorothy first emerges in the late 1420s, when she resided within the Roman Catholic Diocese of Pécs and by which time her father had died. At that time, King Tvrtko II of Bosnia found that his vassals' opposition to his close ties with the neighbouring Kingdom of Hungary was putting his throne in jeopardy. The noblemen were concerned that the Hungarian alliance would provoke an attack by the Ottomans, and that the Hungarians would help him consolidate his power at their expense. Tvrtko responded by strengthening his alliance with the Hungarians even further; Sigismund offered him marriage with Dorothy, and Tvrtko accepted.

== Marriage ==
=== Engagement and wedding ===
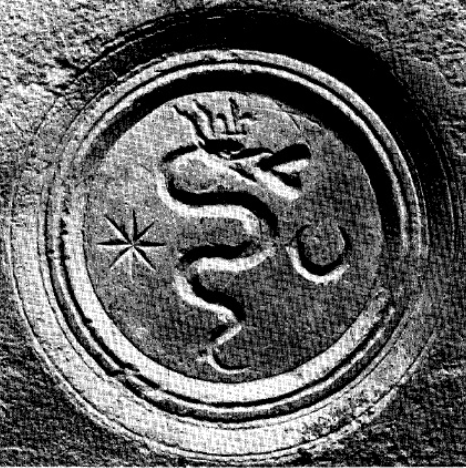
A serpent swallowing a heart, Queen Dorothy's coat of arms as depicted on an artefact found in the Bobovac chapel

The engagement did not immediately receive support of the Roman Catholic Church, however, because Tvrtko's religious affiliations were not clear enough. He admitted his subjects were "shaky Christians" who often changed allegiance from the Catholic Church to the Bosnian Church or even Eastern Orthodox Church and vice versa, but Tvrtko managed to dispel doubts about his loyalty to the Pope, and the marriage went ahead. The sources reporting these marriage negotiations are also the only ones that mention Dorothy by name, which is why historians were for a long time uneasy about identifying her as Tvrtko's wife.

All information about the royal wedding comes from the documents issued by the institutions of the Republic of Ragusa; the Ragusan patricians were keen to learn as much as possible about the Bosnian King's bride. Dorothy was supposed to be received by Tvrtko in Milodraž on 12 July 1428, but the marriage ceremony does not seem to have taken place before August. The wedding festivities lasted for days. Many Bosnian noblemen, including Grand Duke Sandalj Hranić Kosača, refused to attend out of protest. Ragusan representatives on 31 July asked for the young queen to come to Podvisoki so she could receive gifts, as Ragusans had a considerable merchant colony in that town. The new queen may have accompanied her husband on his visit to the Kosača family seat in Blagaj, intended to mend the relations between the vassal and the overlord, in the spring of 1429.

=== Queenship ===
As queen, Dorothy appears to have been both politically active and a patron of art. The Ragusan authorities addressed the Queen as well as the King, and they made effort to flatter her by sending expensive gifts and emphasizing her family's traditionally close relations with the Republic. She was specifically invoked in 1432 when they requested that the larcenous Ljubibratić noble family be banished. The vigorous artistic activity at the royal court in Bobovac during Dorothy's queenship is linked either to her personally or to Tvrtko's desire to please her.

In 1432, Pope Eugene IV sent Saint James of the Marches to reform the Franciscan Province of Bosna Srebrena and eradicate the Bosnian Church. He became vicar and fully empowered inquisitor of Bosnia in 1435 and remained in the kingdom for four more years. His aggressive approach to the Bosnian Church was strongly opposed by King Tvrtko, but it appears that his principal nemesis was the Queen. Their differences were such that Dorothy, "that evil woman", was accused of trying to have James murdered on several occasions, only for him to be saved by various miracles. She is alleged to have eventually grown tired of trying to get rid of him and instead made peace with the saint. The circumstances under which her marriage to Tvrtko was sanctioned leave no place for doubts about her loyalty to the Catholic Church, and the accusations thus seem unfounded. They do, however, indicate that she had great influence on her husband's religious policy.

== Death and posterity ==
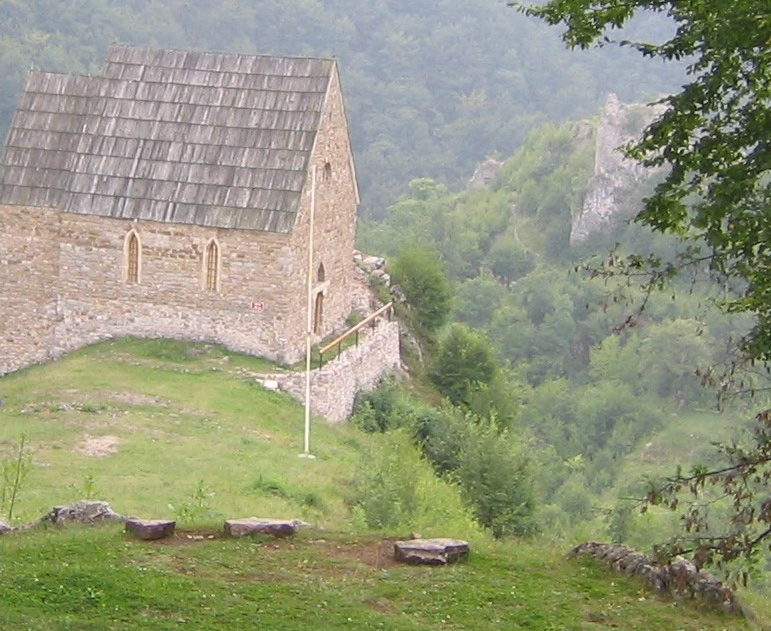
Reconstructed chapel in Bobovac, originally built likely for Queen Dorothy

The marriage of Dorothy and Tvrtko was certainly contracted for political reasons, but Ragusan reports about their wedding festivities and her death, which took place between 19 and 24 September 1438, indicate that the King had genuine affection for his wife. She was interred in the Bobovac chapel, which had probably been built for her. Despite facing succession issues, her widower never remarried and was buried next to her five years later. Her tomb has since been looted. Anthropological research indicates that she was in her twenties when she died.

It is not clear whether Dorothy had children. Sources do not mention any issue of Tvrtko II and Dorothy Garai, so it is generally assumed that the couple were childless. Archaeological excavations in the 20th century resulted in the discovery of a child's grave between the graves of Tvrtko and Dorothy, however, indicating that they may have had a child who died shortly after birth.

== See also ==
- Tvrtko II of Bosnia
- Dorothea of Bulgaria
- Kujava Radinović

Royal titles
Vacant Title last held by Jelena Nelipčić	Queen consort of Bosnia; 1428–1438	Vacant Title next held by Vojača
