= Nicholas Garai =

Nicholas Garai may refer to:

- Nicholas I Garai (c. 1325–1386), Palatine of Hungary
- Nicholas II Garai (1367–1433), Palatine of Hungary
