= Nicholas I Garai =

14th-century Hungarian nobleman

- Palatine; Ban of Macsó; Ban of Croatia and Dalmatia
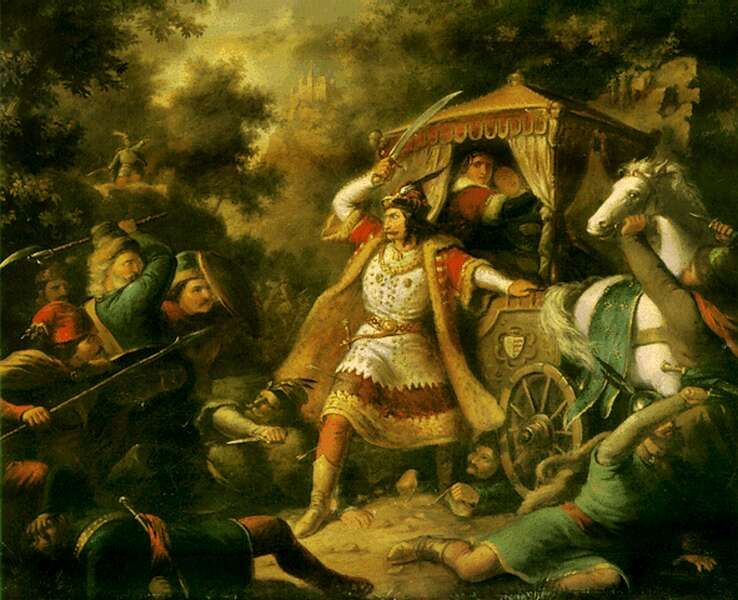
- Nicholas I Garai defending Elizabeth and Mary from the Horvats

Palatine of Hungary
- Reign: October 1375 – August 1385
- Predecessor: Emeric Lackfi
- Successor: Nicholas Szécsi
- Born: c. 1325
- Died: 25 July 1386; Đakovo (Diakovár), Kingdom of Hungary-Croatia
- Noble family: House of Garai
- Spouse: Unknown
- Issue: Nicholas II; John
- Father: Andrew Garai
- Mother: N Nevnai

Nicholas I Garai (Hungarian: Garai I Miklós, Croatian: Nikola I Gorjanski) (c. 1325 – 25 July 1386) was a most influential officeholder under King Louis I and Queen Mary of Hungary. He was ban of Macsó between 1359 and 1375, and palatine from 1375 until his death. He was also ispán or head of a number of counties over his lifetime.

== Early life ==
Son of Andrew Garai and his wife (an unknown daughter of Ladislaus Nevnai), Nicholas Garai was born around 1325. His uncle, Pál Garai (ban of Macsó between 1320 and 1328) was a leading baron under kings Charles I and Louis I of Hungary. Nicholas's career in politics started under Louis I who appointed him to administer the Banate of Macsó in 1359. As ban of Macsó, Nicholas also became the head of Bács, Baranya, Szerém, Valkó and Veszprém counties.

== The influential baron ==
Garai launched, in 1369, a punitive expedition against Vladislav I of Wallachia who had rebelled against King Louis I and defeated a royal army led by Nicholas Lackfi, voivode of Transylvania. The 17th-century historian, Mavro Orbin relates that Garai supported Lazar Hrebeljanović of Serbia and Tvrtko I of Bosnia against their opponents, Nikola Altomanović. Around the same time, he arranged a marriage between his namesake son and a daughter of Lazar Hrebeljanović. Garai participated in the first Hungarian expedition against the Ottomans in 1375.

Supported by Louis I's wife, Elizabeth of Bosnia, Nicholas Garai was appointed palatine in 1376. At the same time, he also became ispán of Pozsony, Csanád, Keve, Krassó and Temes Counties. He acquired more and more offices to his allies and succeeded in pushing aside those who resisted his growing influence. For instance, Stephen Lackfi, the once powerful voivode of Transylvania was dismissed by the king while in a pilgrimage in the Holy Land. On the other hand, one of Garai's allies, Demetrius was in 1378 appointed archbishop of Esztergom and cardinal, although he had most probably been born in a peasant family.

Louis I died on 11 September 1382. His daughter, Mary succeeded him on the throne. At the side of the eleven-year-old monarch, her mother, Elizabeth acted as regent, but the kingdom was in fact administered by Palatine Garai and Cardinal Demetrius. Taking advantage of his preeminent position at the royal court, Garai arranged the imprisonment of his last powerful opponent, Peter Cudar, the governor of Galicia by accusing him of treachery.

The rule of a female monarch remained unpopular in the kingdom which gave rise to the emergence of at least three concurring parties within the nobility. One party, led by John of Palisna, the Hospitaller prior of Vrana openly turned against the queen and proposed the crown to Charles III of Naples, the last male member of the royal house. A second group, led by the judge royal, Nicholas Szécsi and the Lackfis supported Sigismund of Luxembourg, the margrave of Brandenburg who had been engaged to the young queen. A third party was formed by the dowager queen and Garai who were planning to give Queen Mary in marriage to Louis of Orleans, a member of the French royal family.

In accordance with the dowager queen's plans, the betrothal of the young queen and the French duke was announced at the beginning of 1384. In response, Nicholas Szécsi and his partisans decided to renounce their allegiance to the regent in August 1384. Sigismund of Luxembourg left for Bohemia, but returned when an army recruited by his brother, Wenceslaus IV of Bohemia invaded the northern parts of the kingdom in the next year. In the meantime, Paul Horvat, bishop of Zagreb (a former supporter of Garai) invited Charles III of Naples to Hungary. He landed in Dalmatia in September 1385. His arrival forced Queen Elizabeth to abandon the idea of her daughter's marriage to Louis of Orleans. Accordingly, she dismissed Garai and appointed Nicholas Szécsi palatine.

Sigismund of Luxembourg married Queen Mary in October. However, Charles III of Naples continued his invasion and his partisans convoked a Diet (an assembly of noblemen) in order to elect him king. His opponents soon realized his growing popularity among the noblemen. Sigismund of Luxembourg left the kingdom and Queen Mary renounced of the crown. Charles of Naples was crowned king of Hungary on 31 December 1385.

Nicholas I Garai is most famous because he courageously defended his cousin and sovereign, Queen Mary of Hungary, and her mother, Elizabeth of Bosnia, from the Horvat (Horváti) brothers (John and Paul) who were sent to kidnap them. Surrounding the Royal carriage the vastly outnumbered royal escort was overwhelmed, Garai fought them off for a long time. With arrows protruding from his chest, breaking them off so as not to hinder him, dismounting his horse the gallant Miklos delivered sabre blows on the attackers, protecting the Queens by fighting beside the royal carriage. The enemy forces approached from behind, they crawled under the other side of the carriage and grabbing his legs they pulled him to the ground. He was beheaded in the process on 25 July 1386. The enemy showed no mercy as they dragged the Queens out of their royal carriage.

== Family ==
Ancestors of Nicholas I Garai

4. Stephen Dorozsma
2. Andrew Garai
1. Nicholas I Garai
24. George Péc
12. Serfesd Nevnai
6. Ladislaus Nevnai
3. N. Nevnai
28. Keled Kórógyi
14. Gregory Kórógyi
29. Macha N
7. Yolanda Kórógyi

He had four children:

- Nicholas (c. 1367 – 1433), palatine (1402 – 1433), brother-in-law of Sigismund, Holy Roman Emperor
- John (born c. 1371 – died before 9 April 1428), Count of Temes (1402–1417), Count of Pozsega (1411–1417) and Ban of Ozora, married Hedwig of Plock and fathered Queen Dorothea of Bosnia
- Helen (fl. 1424–39), who married Nicholas II Szécsi de Felsőlendva before 1398, mother of Dénes Szécsi
- Dorothea (died 21 April 1425), who married Count Nikola Frankopan (Hungarian: Frangepán Miklós), ban of Dalmatia and Croatia
- Elizabeth, who married Simon Szécsényi

== See also ==
- Dorozsma

== Sources ==
- Árvai, Tünde (2013). "A házasságok szerepe a Garaiak hatalmi törekvéseiben [The role of marriages in the Garais' attempts to rise]". In Fedeles, Tamás; Font, Márta; Kiss, Gergely (eds.). Kor-Szak-Határ (in Hungarian). Pécsi Tudományegyetem. pp. 103–118. ISBN 978-963-642-518-0.
- Engel, Pál (1996). Magyarország világi archontológiája, 1301–1457, I. [Secular Archontology of Hungary, 1301–1457, Volume I] (in Hungarian). História, MTA Történettudományi Intézete. ISBN 963-8312-44-0.
- Engel, Pál (2001). The Realm of St Stephen: A History of Medieval Hungary, 895–1526. I.B. Tauris Publishers. ISBN 1-86064-061-3.
- Fine, John V. A. (1994). The Late Medieval Balkans: A Critical Survey from the Late Twelfth Century to the Ottoman Conquest. The University of Michigan Press. ISBN 0-472-08260-4.
- Fügedi, Erik (2004). Uram, királyom... (in Hungarian). Fekete Sas Kiadó. ISBN 963935264-0.
- Kontler, László (1999). Millennium in Central Europe: A History of Hungary. Atlantisz Publishing House. ISBN 963-9165-37-9.
- Markó, László (2000). A magyar állam főméltóságai Szent Istvántól napjainkig: Életrajzi Lexikon [Great Officers of State in Hungary from King Saint Stephen to Our Days: A Biographical Encyclopedia] (in Hungarian). Magyar Könyvklub. ISBN 963-547-085-1.

Nicholas I House of Garai Born: c. 1325 Died: 25 July 1386
Political offices
Preceded by Nicholas Csák	Ban of Macsó; 1359–1375	Succeeded by John Horvat
Preceded by Emeric Lackfi	Palatine of Hungary; 1375–1385	Succeeded by Nicholas Szécsi
Preceded by Thomas Szentgyörgyi	Ban of Croatia and Dalmatia; 1385–1386	Succeeded by Stephen Losonci
