= Turris vermicularis =

Scientific classification
- Kingdom: Animalia
- Phylum: Mollusca
- Class: Gastropoda
- Subclass: Caenogastropoda
- Order: Neogastropoda
- Superfamily: Conoidea
- Family: Turridae
- Genus: Turris
- Species: T. vermicularis

Binomial name
- Turris vermicularis (Grateloup, 1832)

Synonyms
- Pleurotoma vermicularis Grateloup, 1832

Species of gastropod

Turris vermicularis is an extinct species of sea snail, a marine gastropod mollusk in the family Turridae, the turrids.

== Distribution ==
This extinct marine species was found in Miocene strata off Turin, Italy and off Letkés, Hungary.
