= Garai family =

The House of Garay or Garai (Croatian: Gorjanski) was a Hungarian-noble family, a branch of the Dorozsma (Durusma) clan, with notable members in the 14th and 15th centuries. They were lords of Csesznek.

== Origin ==
The family was descended from the Dorozsma kindred. Béla, Duke of Slavonia, granted the eponymous domain of Gara in Valkó County (now Gorjani in Croatia) to Comes John and his brother, Stephen, in 1269. The charter of grant mentioned that Stephen was the duke's swordbearer. Stephen's sons, Andrew and Paul, were the ancestors of the two branches of the family.

Andrew, the founder of the "Palatine" branch, did not hold offices. He married an unnamed daughter of Ladislaus Nevnai and Yolanda Kórógyi. Nevnai held estates in Valkó and Pozsega Counties. Andrew fathered two sons, Nicholas and Paul, but the latter died young. Their maternal grandmother bequeathed her estates in Baranya County to them.

Andrew's brother, Paul, founded the "Bánfi" branch of the family.

== Notable members ==
=== "Palatine" branch ===
Nicholas I Garai (Croatian: Nikola I Gorjanski, Hungarian: Garai Miklós I), the chief governor of Pressburg, was a palatine to the King of Hungary (1375–1385). He was killed in 1386.

- Nicholas I's first son John Garai (Ivan Gorjanski, Garai János; 1371–1429) was the governor of Temesiensis and Pozsega banates. John's daughter, Dorothy Garai, was Queen of Bosnia as spouse of King Tvrtko II of Bosnia.
  - Nicholas I's second son Nicholas II Garai (Nikola II Gorjanski, Garai Miklós II; 1367–1433) was Palatine to the King of Hungary (1402–1433) ban of Macsó, Usora, Soli, Slavonia, Croatia and Dalmatia, and married to Theodora (Helen), daughter of Serbian Prince Lazar. In 1396 he fought the Ottomans in the Battle of Nicopolis which was lost due to others' errors. In 1416 Sigismund extended their armorial bearings showing the Order of the Dragon and the Order of the Scarf. He presented the patent to his brother-in-law Garai Miklós. Nicholas II's granddaughter Anna was engaged to Matthias Corvinus.
    - Nicholas II's son, Ladislaus Garai (1410–1459) was a Palatine of the Kingdom of Hungary (1447–1458). Based on an agreement with the Hunyadi family he originally supported Matthias Hunyadi as king. Later when Hunyadi did not keep the bargain the barons of the Garai party opposed Matthias Hunyadi. Nor did he marry Anna.
  - Nicholas I also married his daughters well: Ilona was married to the magnate Nicholas II Szécsi, Elizabeth married Simon Szécsényi and Dorothea married Nicholas Frankopan, ban of Croatia and Dalmatia.

=== "Bánfi" branch ===
- Nicholas I's uncle, Paul I Garai (Croatian: Pavao Gorjanski, Hungarian: Garai Pál, Serbian: Pavle Gorjanski; 1280–1353), was also a ban of Macsó. His successors to this position were his son-in-law John Alsáni and his grandson Paul Alsáni.
  - Paul's son, Paul Bánfi de Gara (died in 1377/80) was the governor of Zala County.
  - Paul's other son, Stephen Bánfi de Gara (died in 1346/47) was also the governor of Zala.
    - Stephen's son, Paul Bánfi de Gara (died in 1386) was the governor of Zala as well.
      - Paul's son, Dezső Bánfi de Gara (died in 1437/40) was a ban of Macsó.

== Family tree ==
=== Common ancestors ===
The following family tree depicts the known members of the family before its split into two branches: (* = born; † = died; ∞ = wife or husband; b. = before; c. = in about; m. = mentioned)

NN
John	Stephen
Andrew ∞N. Nevnai	Paul
"Palatine" branch	"Bánfi" branch

=== "Palatine" branch ===
The following family tree depicts the known members of the "Palatine" branch of the family: (* = born; † = died; ∞ = wife or husband; b. = before; c. = in about; m. = mentioned)

Andrew ∞N. Nevnai
Nicholas I Garai	Paul
Nicholas II Garai; 1∞Helena of Serbia; 2∞Anna of Celje	Elisabeth ∞Simon Szécsényi	Helen ∞Nicholas II Szécsi	Dorothea ∞Nicholas Frankopan	John Garai ∞Hedwig of Masovia
(1) Nicholas III Garai ∞Margaret Cseh	(2) Ladislaus Garai ∞Alexandra of Cieszyn	(2) Dorothea; 1∞Ladislaus Kanizsai; 2∞Raynald Rozgonyi	(2) Barbara ∞John Korógyi	Catherine ∞Nicholas Bebek	Dorothea; Tvrtko II of Bosnia
Job Garai ∞Euphrosina Újlaki	Anne ∞Emeric Hédervári

== See also ==
- Nobility and royalty of the Kingdom of Hungary
- Croatian nobility

== Sources ==
- Árvai, Tünde (2013). "A házasságok szerepe a Garaiak hatalmi törekvéseiben [The role of marriages in the Garais' attempts to rise]". In Fedeles, Tamás; Font, Márta; Kiss, Gergely (eds.). Kor-Szak-Határ (in Hungarian). Pécsi Tudományegyetem. pp. 103–118. ISBN 978-963-642-518-0.
- Engel, Pál (2001). The Realm of St Stephen: A History of Medieval Hungary, 895–1526. I.B. Tauris Publishers. ISBN 1-86064-061-3.
- Fügedi, Erik (2004). Uram, királyom... (in Hungarian). Fekete Sas Kiadó. ISBN 963935264-0.
- Molnár, Miklós (2001). A Concise History of Hungary. Cambridge University Press. ISBN 978-0-521-66736-4.
