= Hedwig of Masovia =

Polish princess

Hedwig of Masovia (Polish: Jadwiga mazowiecka, Hungarian: Hedvig mazóviai hercegnő; also Hedviga of Masovia) (ca. 1392 – after 19 February 1439 CE), was a Polish princess, member of the House of Piast in the Masovian branch.

She was the eldest daughter of Siemowit IV, Duke of Masovia and Alexandra, a daughter of Algirdas, Grand Duke of Lithuania and sister of King Władysław II Jagiełło of Poland.

== Life ==
On 3 January 1410, Hedwig married the Hungarian magnate John Garai, Ban of Ozora and ispán of Temes and Požega Counties. This union had undoubtedly a political objective. Hedwig's father Siemowit IV, during the Polish-Teutonic War wanted to be close to the Hungarian King Sigismund of Luxembourg, who at that point was an undercover ally of the Teutonic Order. It is not excluded that the wedding of his vassal's daughter to an influential Hungarian magnate was approved by King Władysław II Jagiełło of Poland, hoping that after this union relations with the Hungarian King could be improved, and his approval be obtained for a war against the Order. The marriage was probably instigated by Sigismund's wife Barbara of Cilli, a cousin of the Polish Queen Anna of Cilli, Władysław II's second wife.

Hedwig had four children:

- Hedwig (d. ca. 1435), married Petar Talovac, Ban of Croatia.
- Catherine (d. ca. 1435/37), married Nicholas Bebek de Pelsőc, ispán of Gömör County.
- Stephen (d. bef. 1430).
- Dorothea, Queen consort of Bosnia (d. September 1438), married King Tvrtko II of Bosnia.

John Garai died before 9 April 1428. In 1435, the Hungarian Diet began a process against Hedwig, who was falsely accused of poisoning her husband. Allegedly, she killed her husband because she feared that he could discover her affair with one of his relatives, Nicholas Szécsényi. In addition, during the process she was accused of incitement to prostitution in the person of her daughter Catherine. It is generally believed that these false charges - and a show trial - were concocted in order to seize her property.

Members of the Garai family, who belonged to the Hungarian elite, testified against her. King Sigismund declared that all her property was to be confiscated, and she was imprisoned for life in the castle of her husband's family. She spent rest of her life in house arrest in good living conditions in the fort of Ladislaus Garai.
