= Ladislaus Nevnai =

Hungarian nobleman and landowner

- Died: after 1324
- Noble family: House of Nevnai
- Spouse: Yolanda Kórógyi
- Issue: Catherine a daughter
- Father: Serfesd Nevnai

Ladislaus Nevnai (Hungarian: Nevnai László, Croatian: Ladislav de Neona; died after 1324) was a Hungarian nobleman and landowner in Slavonia at the turn of the 13th and 14th centuries. Through his daughters, he was an ancestor of the powerful Treutel and Garai families.

== Biography ==
Ladislaus originated from the Zala branch of the extended gens (clan) Péc, which had large-scale possessions in several counties of Transdanubia, in addition to other parts of the Kingdom of Hungary. He belonged to the so-called Ludbreg sub-branch, founded by his grandfather, George Péc. His father was Serfesd, who was referred to with the surname Nevnai after his residence Nevna (or Névna), present-day Levanjska Varoš in Croatia. His uncles were Denis Péc, a powerful baron and Palatine of Hungary in the second half of the 13th century, and Peter Ludbregi, who owned Ludbreg.

Nevnai first appears in contemporary records in 1284. He married Yolanda Kórógyi, who came from an influential noble family. She is mentioned by a sole document in 1290, when she was granted the castle of Orjava (today Orljavac, Croatia) from her father, Gregory Kórógyi. Nevnai held estates in Valkó and Pozsega Counties, and was considered one of the richest landowners of the region. He fathered two daughters, Catherine and an unidentified girl. Their marriages to Nicholas Treutel and Andrew Garai, respectively, have prompted the rise of the Treutel kinship and the Palatinal branch of the Garai family. Nevnai's grandsons, among others, were the powerful barons Nicholas Garai and John Treutel. Nevnai handed over his estate of Nevna to his son-in-law Nicholas Treutel in 1324 (Catherine inherited daughters' quarter within this). It is presumable he died shortly thereafter without male descendants, ending the Nevnai family line after two generations.

== Sources ==
- Árvai, Tünde (2013). "A házasságok szerepe a Garaiak hatalmi törekvéseiben [The role of marriages in the Garais' attempts to rise]". In Fedeles, Tamás; Font, Márta; Kiss, Gergely (eds.). Kor-Szak-Határ (in Hungarian). Pécsi Tudományegyetem. pp. 103–118. ISBN 978-963-642-518-0.
- Engel, Pál (1996). Magyarország világi archontológiája, 1301–1457, I. [Secular Archontology of Hungary, 1301–1457, Volume I] (in Hungarian). História, MTA Történettudományi Intézete. ISBN 963-8312-44-0.
- Seletković, Petar (2018). "Plemićki posjed Nevna u srednjem vijeku [The Nevna Manor in the Middle Ages]". Scrinia Slavonica (in Croatian). 18 (1): 29–68. ISSN 1332-4853.
