= Dorozsma =

Dorozsma (de genere Durusma) was a genus (Latin for "clan"; nemzetség in Hungarian) in the Kingdom of Hungary. Their ancient possessions were in Csongrád county (today: village of Kiskundorozsma).

== Notable members of the genus ==
=== Nicholas I's branch ===
- Nicholas I Garai
  - Nicholas I's first son John Garai
  - Nicholas I's second son Nicholas II Garai
    - Nicholas II's son, Ladislaus Garai

=== Paul Garai's branch ===
- Nicholas I's uncle, Paul I Garai
  - Paul's son, Paul Bánfi de Gara
  - Paul's other son, Stephen Bánfi de Gara
    - Stephen's son, Paul Bánfi de Gara
      - Paul's son, Dezső Bánfi de Gara
