= Nicholas II Garai =

Hungarian baron (c. 1367 – 1433)

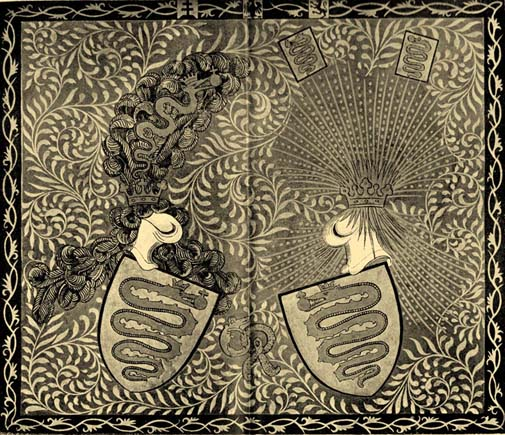
Coat of arms of Nicholas II Garai given by the French king in a diploma dated 26 March of 1416

Nicholas II Garai (Hungarian: II. Garai Miklós, Croatian: Nikola II Gorjanski; c. 1367 – December 1433) was a powerful Hungarian baron who served as the Palatine of Hungary from 1402 until 1433 and the ban of Macsó, Usora, Só, Slavonia, Croatia and Dalmatia. He also ruled over the Braničevo, Syrmia, Bačka, Banat and Baranya regions through vassals. Together with his close ally Stibor of Stiboricz, he remained one of the richest and most powerful nobles in Hungary for over 30 years. Nicholas II Garai also served as de facto ruler of Hungary next to King Sigismund. In 1416 Sigismund extended their armorial bearings showing the Order of the Dragon and the Order of the Scarf. He presented the patent to his brother-in-law. Nicholas II's first wife was Theodora of Serbia, daughter of Prince Lazar of Serbia. In 1405, he married Anna of Cilli, sister of King Sigismund's second wife, Barbara of Cilli, thereby becoming brother-in-law of the King and Queen of Hungary. His granddaughter Anna was engaged to King Matthias Corvinus.

== Early life ==
Nicholas was the son of Nicholas I Garai and his wife, whose name is unknown. His father established the prestige and the wealth of the Garai family during the reign of Louis I of Hungary. The year of Nicholas's birth is unknown, but he was born between the late 1350s and the middle of the 1360s. His father arranged Nicholas's engagement to Helen, a daughter of Lazar of Serbia.

Nicholas was present when his father died fighting against John Horváti and John of Palisna near their family seat, Gara (now Gorjani in Croatia), on 25 July 1386. Horváti and Palisna had risen up against Louis I's daughter and successor, Mary, in favor of Ladislaus of Naples. Nicholas became a staunch supporter of Mary's husband, Sigismund of Luxemburg, who was crowned King of Hungary on 31 March 1387.

== Career ==
=== Ban of Macsó ===
Sigismund made Nicholas ban (or governor) of Macsó (now Mačva in Serbia). The bans had traditionally also administered the nearby Bács, Baranya, Bodrog, Szerém and Valkó Counties. He and Stephen Losonci, Ban of Szörény, joined their forces and routed Horváti near Cserög (now Čerević in Serbia), thus restoring the king's authority in the region. In 1387, Nicholas was also made ispán (or head) of Verőce County. He persuaded his father-in-law, Lazar of Serbia, to swear fealty to Sigismund in 1389, according to a royal charter issued almost two decades later.

Situated near the southern frontiers, his estates were subjected to Ottoman raids, thus Nicholas wanted to seize new estates in the central territories of the Kingdom of Hungary. At his initiative, Sigismund seized Pápa and the fortress of Somló in Transdanubia from Nicholas Zámbó in exchange for royal estates in 1389. Nicholas soon persuaded the king to grant both domains to him and his brother, John, for their castle at Ivánkaszentgyörgy (Ivankovo, Croatia). Since Nicholas could not secure the defence of the southern frontier, the king dismissed him, appointing Losonci to administer Macsó in 1390. Before long, he regained the favor of the king who again made him ban of Macsó in 1393. Sigismund transferred Nicholas from Macsó to Croatia and Dalmatia in 1394. In May, a royal charter referred to him as the former ban of Macsó.

=== Ban of Croatia, Dalmatia and Slavonia ===
Nicholas was first styled as the ban of Croatia and Dalmatia in a royal diploma issued in December. Historian Stanko Andrić proposes that King Sigismund promoted Nicholas to the new office most probably after the successful royal campaign against Bosnia in July. Before the end of the year, Nicholas routed Vuk Vukčić whom Ladislaus of Naples had appointed to represent him as his ban in the two realms. After his victory, the burghers of Split elected him the count of the town.

Nicholas left Croatia and Dalmatia to join Sigismund 's invasion of Wallachia in July 1395. He and Peter Perényi commanded the rearguard during the withdrawal of the royal troops from Wallachia. He spent several months in his estates before returning to Croatia. He and John Szepesi, Bishop of Zagreb, jointly presided the sabor (or general assembly) in July 1396.

Nicholas accompanied Sigismund to a large-scale military campaign against the Ottoman Empire in 1396. The crusade ended with the Ottomans' great victory in the Battle of Nicopolis on 25 September, but Nicholas was one of the few who could flee from the battlefield. The Sigismund's defeat outraged Stephen II Lackfi, one of the noblemen whom Sigismund had appointed to rule the country during his absence. He and his nephew approached Ladislaus of Naples, who had not abdicated his claim to Hungary.

Nicholas came back from the crusade in King Sigismund's retinue. They landed at Split in Dalmatia on 21 December 1396. Before the end of the year, the burghers of Split elected Nicholas their count. The king and Nicholas put an end to the movements of the supporters of Ladislaus of Naples in the Dalmatian towns before hurrying to Križevci. The two Lackfis were summoned to the town where they were captured and murdered on 27 February 1397. Historian László Markó says, Nicholas and Hermann of Celje enticed them to come to Slavonia to facilitate their murder. Another historian, Elemér Mályusz, emphasizes that the exact circumstances of the purge are unknown, but he proposes that John Kanizsai, Archbishop of Esztergom, was most probably its initiator. After the "Bloody Sabor of Križevci" Sigismund made Nicholas Ban of Slavonia.

King Sigismund granted Osor and Cres in Dalmatia to Nicholas and his brother in May. The two estates had been possessed by John Szerecsen and his sons, who failed to pay the taxes due to the bans. Sigismund held a Diet (or legislative assembly) at Temesvár (now Timișoara in Romania) to adopt measures to secure the defense of the southern frontier of the kingdom. At the Diet, the king granted "the banship of Dalmatia, Croatia and Slavonia together with its appurtenances and income" on 2 November 1397 to Nicholas and John Garai for the rest of their lives.

=== Palatine ===
Sigismund made him Palatine of Hungary in September 1402.

== Family ==
Ancestors of Nicholas II Garai

8. Stephen Dorozsma
4. Andrew Garai
2. Nicholas I Garai
20. Serfesd Nevnai
10. Ladislaus Nevnai
5. N. Nevnai
22. Gregory Kórógyi
11. Yolanda Kórógyi
1. Nicholas II Garai

Nicholas's first wife, Helen (born as Theodora), was the daughter of Lazar of Serbia and his wife, Princess Milica Nemanjic, who was member of collateral branch of the Nemanjić dynasty. The year of their marriage is unknown, but it must have taken place before 1389, because in that year Nicholas was already Lazar's son-in-law. She gave birth to Nicholas's eldest son and namesake. Helen died before 1401, and Nicholas married Anne of Celje, daughter of count Hermann II of Celje. They had a daughter, Catherine, who married Henry VI, Count of Gorizia and gave birth to the last two sovereign counts of Gorizia, John II and Leonhard.

== See also ==
- House of Garai
- Dorozsma

== Sources ==
- Andrić, Stanko (2015). "A Garai főnemesi család és a Horvát Királyság / Velikaška obitelj Gorjanski i Hrvatsko Kraljevstvo [The aristocratic Garai family and the Kingdom of Croatia]". In Fodor, Pál; Sokcsevits, Dénes; Turkalj, Jasna; Karbić, Damir (eds.). A horvát-magyar együttélés fordulópontjai: Intézmények, társadalom, gazdaság, kultúra / Prekretnice u suživotu Hrvata i Mađara: Ustanove, društvo, gospodarstvo i kultura [Turning Points of the Croatian-Hungarian Co-habitation: Institutions, Society, Economy and Culture] (in Hungarian and Croatian). MTA Bölcsészettudományi Kutatóközpont Történettudományi Intézet, Hrvatski institut za povijest. pp. 481–492, 543–554. ISBN 978-963-416-019-9.
- Árvai, Tünde (2013). "A házasságok szerepe a Garaiak hatalmi törekvéseiben [The role of marriages in the Garais' attempts to rise]". In Fedeles, Tamás; Font, Márta; Kiss, Gergely (eds.). Kor-Szak-Határ (in Hungarian). Pécsi Tudományegyetem. pp. 103–118. ISBN 978-963-642-518-0.
- Árvai, Tünde (2014). "„magnus comes de Hungaria": Garai Miklós nádor Nyugat-Európában [„magnus comes de Hungaria": Palatine Nicholas Garai in Western Europe]". In Bárány, Attila; Pósán, László (eds.). "Causa unionis, causa fidei, causa reformationis in capite et membris". Tanulmányok a konstanzi zsinat 600. évfordulója alkalmából (in Hungarian). Print-Art. pp. 316–327. ISBN 978-963-89963-3-6.
- C. Tóth, Norbert (2015). "Garai Milós dalmát-horvát és szlavón bán örkös bánságának kérdése: A Garaiak dalmáciai birtoklása a 14. század végén / Pitanje doživotnog banovanja dalmatinsko-hrvatskog i slavonskog bana Nikole Gorjanskog: Dalmatinski posjed Gorjanskih na koncu 14. stoljeća [The problem of the hereditary banship of Nicholas Garai: The Garais' possessions in Dalmatia at the end of the 14th century]". In Fodor, Pál; Sokcsevits, Dénes; Turkalj, Jasna; Karbić, Damir (eds.). A horvát-magyar együttélés fordulópontjai: Intézmények, társadalom, gazdaság, kultúra / Prekretnice u suživotu Hrvata i Mađara: Ustanove, društvo, gospodarstvo i kultura [Turning Points of the Croatian-Hungarian Co-habitation: Institutions, Society, Economy and Culture] (in Hungarian and Croatian). MTA Bölcsészettudományi Kutatóközpont Történettudományi Intézet, Hrvatski institut za povijest. pp. 493–503, 555–564. ISBN 978-963-416-019-9.
- Engel, Pál (1996). Magyarország világi archontológiája, 1301–1457, I. [Secular Archontology of Hungary, 1301–1457, Volume I] (in Hungarian). História, MTA Történettudományi Intézete. ISBN 963-8312-44-0.
- Engel, Pál (2001). The Realm of St Stephen: A History of Medieval Hungary, 895–1526. I.B. Tauris Publishers. ISBN 1-86064-061-3.
- Fine, John V. A. (1994). The Late Medieval Balkans: A Critical Survey from the Late Twelfth Century to the Ottoman Conquest. The University of Michigan Press. ISBN 0-472-08260-4.
- Fügedi, Erik (2004). Uram, királyom... (in Hungarian). Fekete Sas Kiadó. ISBN 963935264-0.
- Mályusz, Elemér (1984). Zsigmond király uralma Magyarországon, 1387-1437 [The Rule of King Sigismund in Hungary, 1387-1437] (in Hungarian). Gondolat. ISBN 963-281-414-2.
- Markó, László (2000). A magyar állam főméltóságai Szent Istvántól napjainkig: Életrajzi Lexikon [Great Officers of State in Hungary from King Saint Stephen to Our Days: A Biographical Encyclopedia] (in Hungarian). Magyar Könyvklub. ISBN 963-547-085-1.

Nicholas II House of Garai Born: c. 1367 Died: December 1433
Political offices
Preceded by John Bánfi	Ban of Macsó; 1387–1390	Succeeded by Stephen Losonci
Preceded by George Lackfi	Ban of Macsó; 1393–1394	Succeeded by Nicholas Treutel & Stephen Kórógyi
Preceded by Ivan Frankopan	Ban of Croatia and Dalmatia; 1394–1402	Succeeded by Eberhard Albeni & Emeric Bebek
Preceded by Derek Bebek	Ban of Slavonia; 1397–1402	Succeeded by Eberhard Albeni & Emeric Bebek
Preceded by Derek Bebek	Palatine of Hungary; 1402–1433	Vacant Title next held by Matthew Pálóci
