= Letkés =

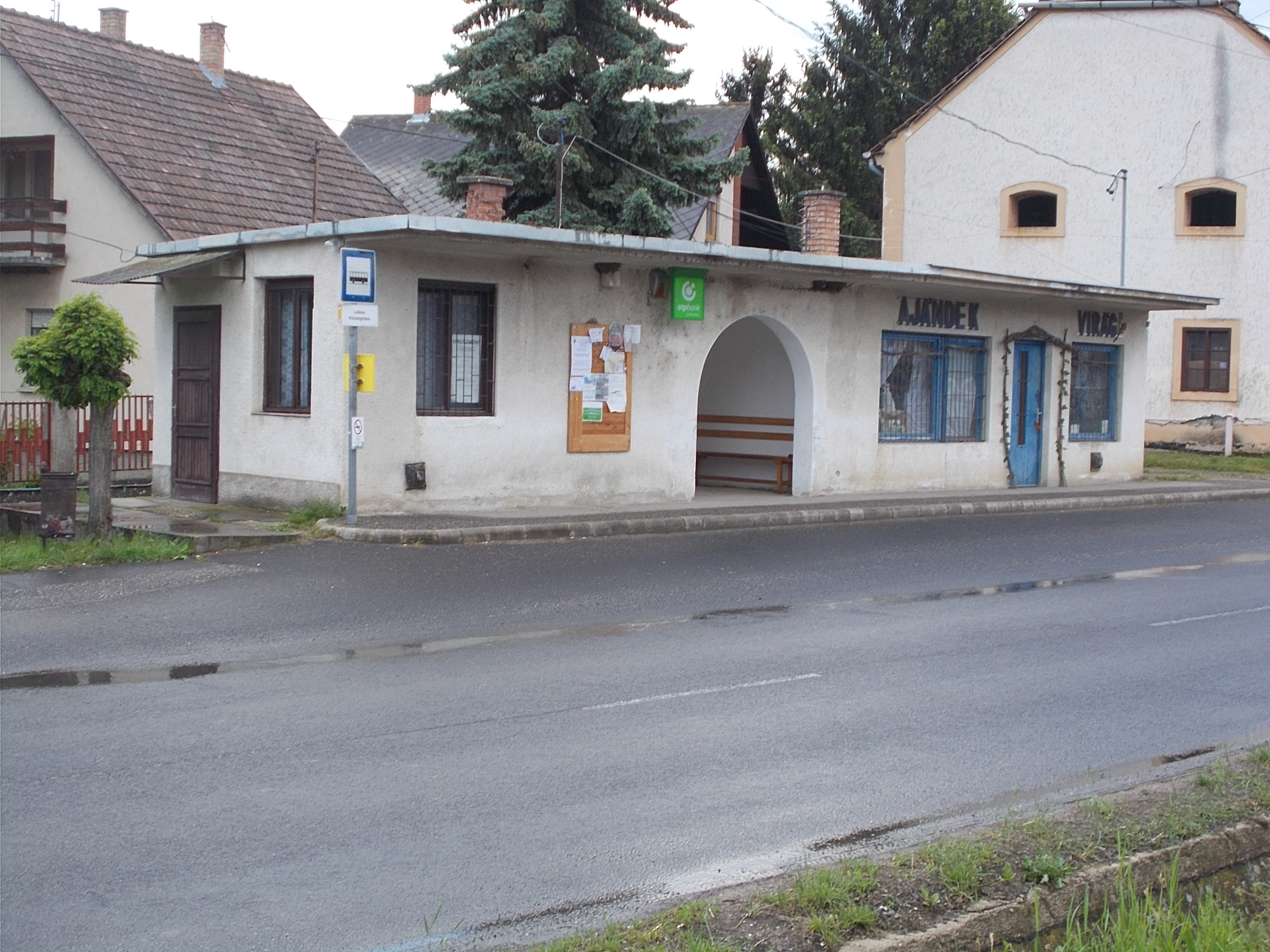
- Village hall

- Flag Coat of arms

- Location of Letkés in Hungary
- Coordinates: 47.88671°N 18.77143°E
- Country: Hungary
- Region: Central Hungary
- County: Pest
- Subregion: Szobi
- Rank: Village

Area
  - Total: 24.55 km^{2} (9.48 sq mi)

Population (1 January 2008)
  - Total: 1,165
  - Density: 47.45/km^{2} (122.9/sq mi)
- Time zone: UTC+1 (CET)
  - Summer (DST): UTC+2 (CEST)
- Postal code: 2632
- Area code: +36 27
- KSH code: 22682
- Website: www.letkes.hu

Letkés is a village in Pest county, Hungary.
