= Temes County =

County of the Kingdom of Hungary

Temes County Comitatus Temesiensis (Latin) Temes vármegye (Hungarian) Komitat Temes (German) Comitatul Timiș (Romanian) Тамишка жупанија (Serbian)
- County of the Kingdom of Hungary (12th century-1526); County of the Eastern Hungarian Kingdom (1526-1552); County of the Kingdom of Hungary (1779-1849, 1860-1920)
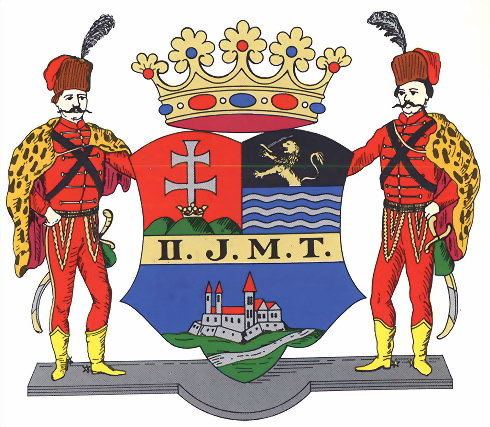
- Coat of arms

- Capital: Temesvár
- Area
  - Coordinates: 45°45′N 21°14′E
  - 1910: 7,433 km^{2} (2,870 sq mi)
- Population
  - 1910: 500,835
- History
  - Established: 12th century
  - Ottoman conquest: 26 July 1552
  - County recreated: 23 April 1779
  - Disestablished: 18 November 1849
  - County recreated: 27 December 1860
  - Treaty of Trianon: 4 June 1920
- Today part of: Romania (5,552 km^{2}); Serbia (1,881 km^{2})
- Timișoara is the current name of the capital.

County of Temes (Hungarian: Temes, Romanian: Timiș, Serbian: Тамиш or Tamiš, German: Temes or Temesch) was an administrative county (comitatus) of the Kingdom of Hungary. Its territory is now in southwestern Romania and northeastern Serbia. The capital of the county was Temesvár (Romanian: Timișoara, Serbian: Темишвар or Temišvar, German: Temeswar or Temeschwar), which also served as the kingdom's capital between 1315–1323.

== Geography ==
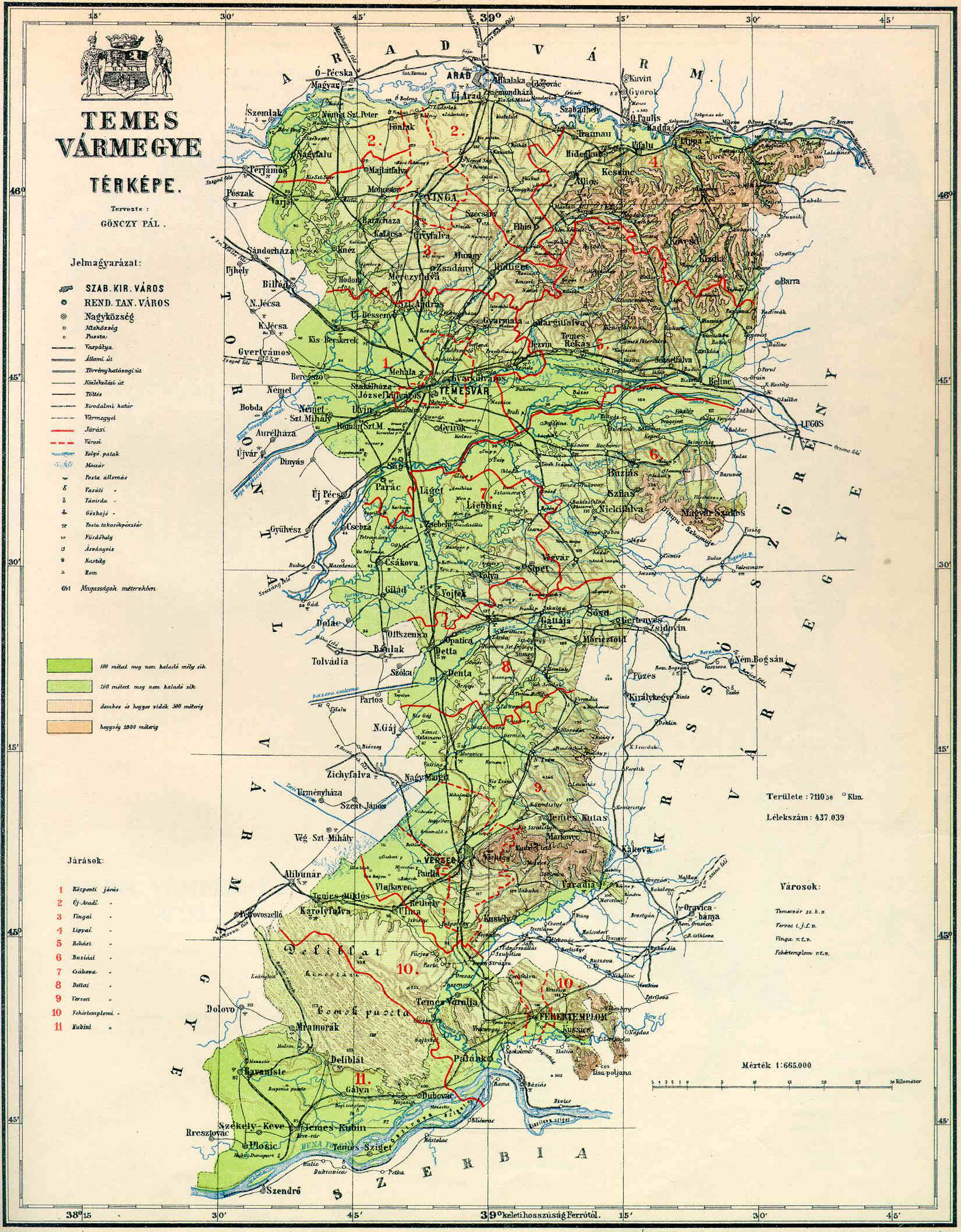
Temes County in 1891

Temes county was located in the Banat region. It shared borders with the Kingdom of Serbia and the Hungarian counties of Torontál, Arad and Krassó-Szörény. The river Danube formed its southern border, and the river Mureș its northern border. The rivers Bega, Timiș, Bârzava and Caraș flowed through the county. Its area in 1910 was 7,433 km^{2} (2,870 sq mi).

== History ==
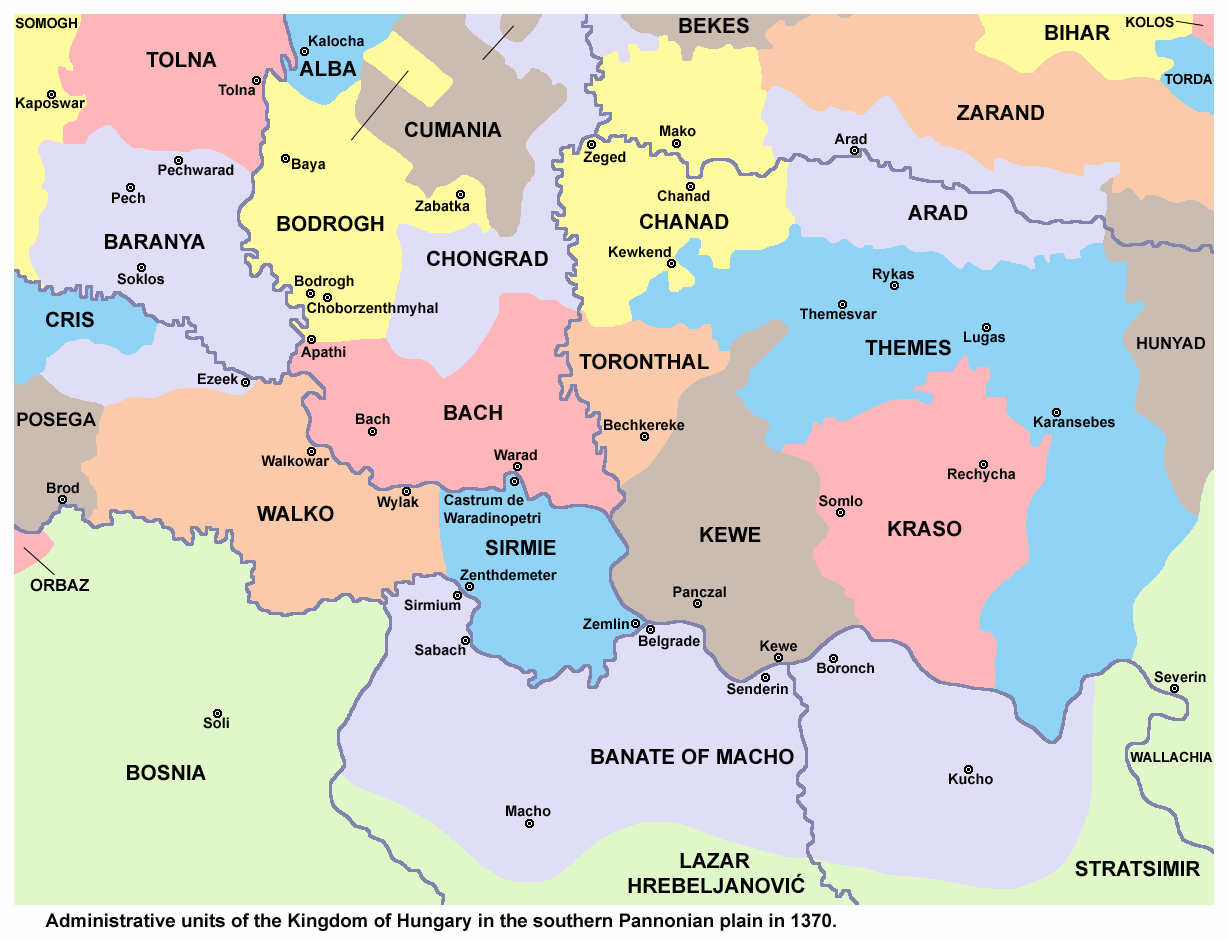
Temes County in 1370

Temes County was formed in the 12th century, after the establishment of Hungarian rule in the region. It was named after the local Temes river. The principal center of the county was named Temesvár, in the Hungarian language, meaning literally: Temes Castle. The territory was affected during the power struggle between Samuel Aba and king Peter Orseolo. In 1070, the Pechenegs, allying with the Byzantines, who tried to annex the territory, devastated the region, before they were routed by king Géza I. In the late 11th century, Cuman and Byzantine raids restarted, but were repelled by king Ladislaus I. By the reign of king Béla III, a substantial part of the territory was inhabited by various Slavic and Turkic groups, due to constant raids and the decrease of the Hungarian population.

The first mention of the county was in 1212. The area was taken by the Ottoman Empire in the 16th century, following the Siege of Temesvár (1552), and the county was abolished. Its territory was then included into the Ottoman Temeşvar Eyalet. In 1594-1595, the entire region was affected by the anti-Ottoman Banat uprising of local Christians, mainly Serbs and Romanians.

During the Great Turkish War (1683-1699), much of the surrounding region was temporarily liberated, but Temesvár remained in Ottoman hands, and thus under the Treaty of Karlowitz (1699) the entire territory was returned to the Ottoman rule. Those regions, including Temesvár, were finally captured by the Habsburg monarchy during the next Austro-Turkish War (1716–1718). Under the Treaty of Passarowitz (1718) the region became a permanent Habsburg possession, and was included into a newly created Habsburg province, called the Banat of Temeswar.

That province was abolished in 1778, and the county of Temes was restored, with significantly different borders than in medieval times, and incorporated into Habsburg Kingdom of Hungary in 1779. By that time, the Banat Military Frontier was formed in southern regions, along Danube. The recreated Temes county was culturally diverse, both ethnically and linguistically (Germans, Hungarians, Romanians, Serbs and others), and also in terms of its religious composition (Eastern Orthodox, Protestant and Roman Catholic Christians, and also Jews).

Between 1849 and 1860, the area of the county was part of the Voivodeship of Serbia and Temes Banat, a separate Austrian crownland. After 1853, the county did not exist since the voivodeship was divided into districts. After the voivodeship was abolished in 1860, the area was again incorporated into the Habsburg Kingdom of Hungary and the county was recreated in January 1861. In 1873, when the administrative structure of the Kingdom of Hungary was changed, the borders of Temes County were modified to include parts of the territory of the former Banat Military Frontier (including Fehértemplom/Bela Crkva, formerly the seat of the so-called Illyrian Regiment).

In the autumn of 1918, at the very end of the First World War, the ephemeral Banat Republic was proclaimed in Temesvár, but the attempt to create a Banatian state failed after several days. Under the Armistice of Belgrade (13 November), armed forces of Austria-Hungary were obligated to retreated from the territory of Temes county, and the region was possessed by the Allied Army of the Orient, thus allowing the French troops and the Serbian Royal Army to establish effective control south of the Baja-Szeged-Mureș line.

By that time, the process of political dissolution of Austria-Hungary has already escalated and entered its final stages, and on 16 November the First Hungarian Republic was proclaimed in Budapest. In the same time, local Serbian and other Slavic leaders organized the Great People's Assembly of Serbs, Bunjevci and other Slavs in Banat, Bačka and Baranja, that was held on 25 November in Novi Sad, and proclaimed the unification of those regions (Banat, Bačka and Baranja, including the Temes county), into the Kingdom of Serbia. Several days later, on 1 December 1918, the Kingdom of Serbs, Croats and Slovenes was proclaimed, encompassing Serbia with Montenegro, and South Slavic provinces of the former Austria-Hungary. On the same day, representatives of Romanian people held the Great National Assembly of Alba Iulia, and proclaimed unification with the Kingdom of Romania. Thus, three countries laid claims on the Temes county, the Hungarian Republic and the newly united kingdoms, Yugoslav and Romanian.

The question was settled by the Paris Peace Conference (1918): a majority of the county was assigned to Romania, while the south-western third was assigned to the Kingdom of Serbs, Croats and Slovenes (renamed to Yugoslavia in 1929). Other questions were finalized by the Treaty of Trianon of 1920, and later border arrangements between Romania and Yugoslavia.

The Yugoslav part of the pre-1920 Temes County (the southern region) is part of the Serbian autonomous region of Vojvodina. The Romanian part is now part of Timiș County, except for a ~10 km (6.2 mi) wide strip along the Mureș River, which is in Arad County.

== Demographics ==
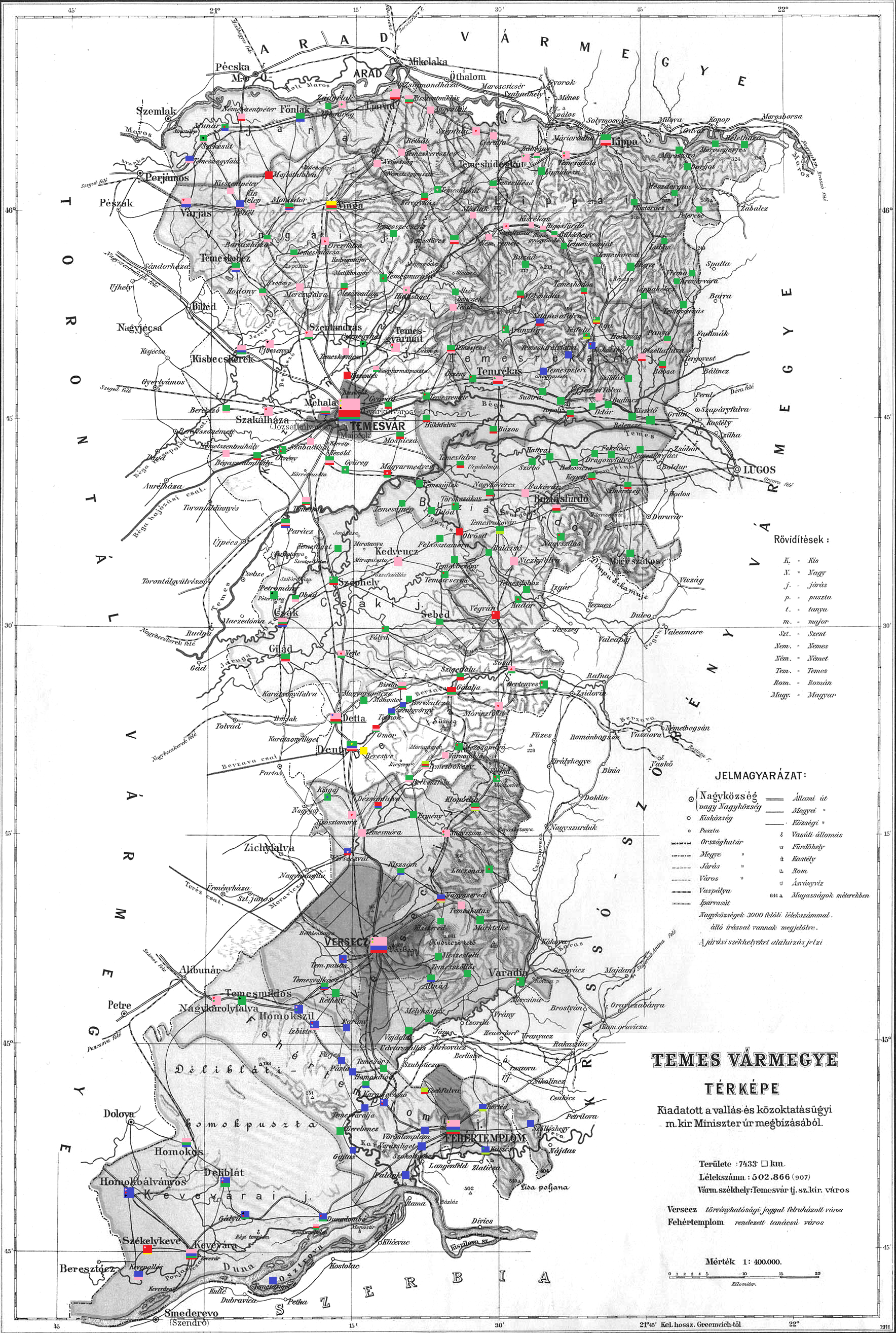
Ethnic map of the county with data of the 1910 census (see the key in the description).

Population by mother tongue (Note: Only linguistic communities > 1% are displayed.)
Census	Total	Romanian	German	Hungarian	Serbian	Other or unknown
1880	396,045	148,928 (39.03%)	137,239 (35.96%)	25,955 (6.80%)	55,520 (14.55%) (Note: Serbian and Croatian.)	13,976 (3.66%)
1890	437,039	161,449 (36.94%)	160,456 (36.71%)	37,976 (8.69%)	62,813 (14.37%)	14,345 (3.28%)
1900	476,242	167,523 (35.18%)	171,087 (35.92%)	58,153 (12.21%)	64,902 (13.63%)	14,577 (3.06%)
1910	500,835	169,030 (33.75%)	165,883 (33.12%)	79,960 (15.97%)	69,905 (13.96%)	16,057 (3.21%) (Note: Mostly Bulgarian, Roma, Slovak and Czech.)

Population by religion (Note: Only religious communities > 1% are displayed.)
Census	Total	Eastern Orthodox	Roman Catholic	Lutheran	Greek Catholic	Calvinist	Jewish	Other or unknown
1880	396,045	200,946 (50.74%)	161,536 (40.79%)	9,305 (2.35%)	11,236 (2.84%)	5,138 (1.30%)	7,630 (1.93%)	254 (0.06%)
1890	437,039	213,531 (48.86%)	186,011 (42.56%)	9,888 (2.26%)	12,339 (2.82%)	6,269 (1.43%)	8,649 (1.98%)	352 (0.08%)
1900	476,242	223,247 (46.88%)	209,690 (44.03%)	11,993 (2.52%)	12,360 (2.60%)	8,712 (1.83%)	9,745 (2.05%)	495 (0.10%)
1910	500,835	232,057 (46.33%)	221,175 (44.16%)	13,611 (2.72%)	12,381 (2.47%)	11,135 (2.22%)	9,734 (1.94%)	742 (0.15%)

== Subdivisions ==
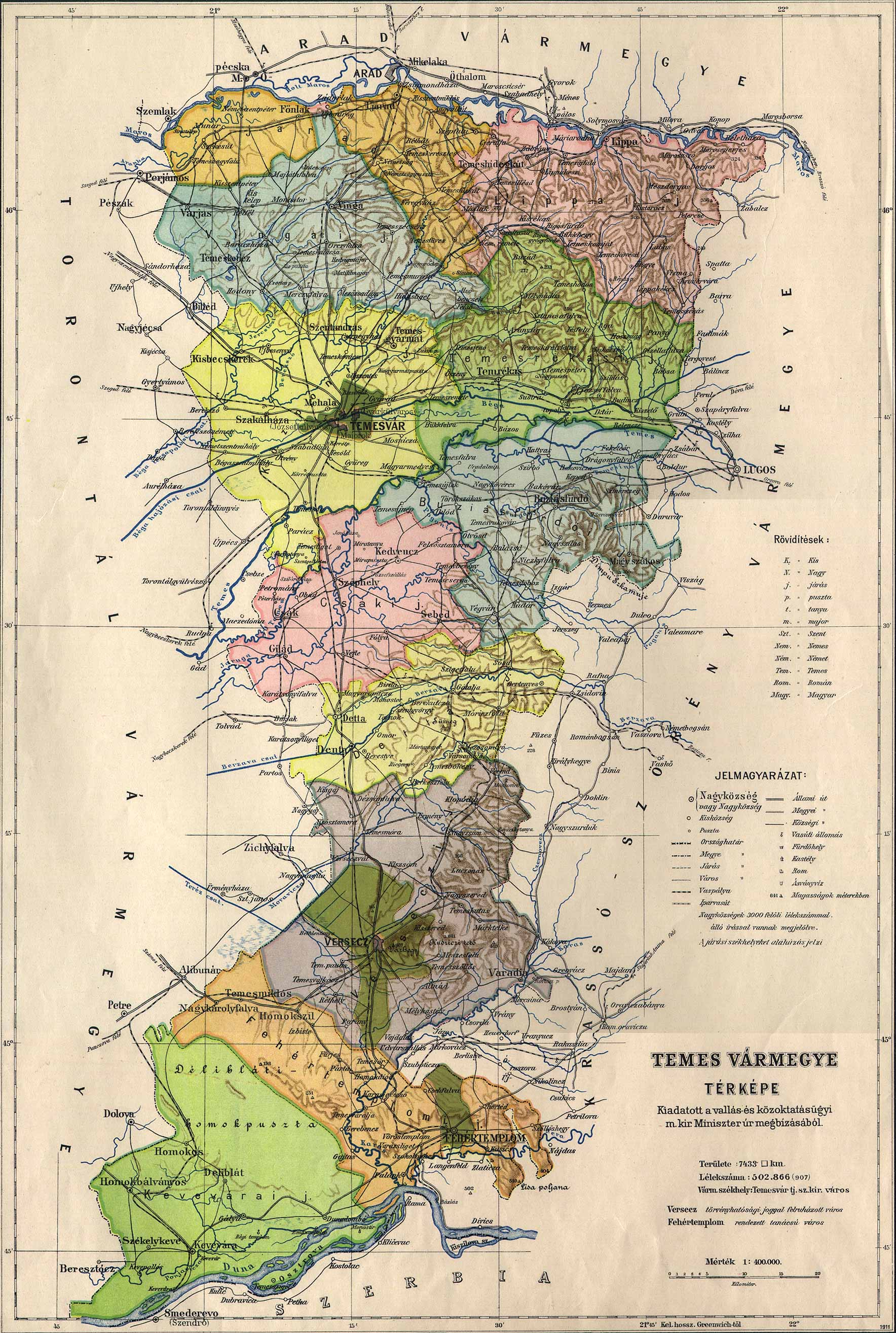
Temes County (administrative division)

In the early 20th century, the subdivisions of Temes county were:

Districts (járás)
District	Capital
Buziasfürdő	Buziasfürdő (now Buziaș)
Csák	Csák (now Ciacova)
Detta	Detta (now Deta)
Fehértemplom	Fehértemplom (now Bela Crkva)
Kevevára	Kevevára (now Kovin)
Központ	Temesvár (now Timișoara)
Lippa	Lippa (now Lipova)
Temesrékas	Temesrékas (now Recaș)
Újarad	Újarad (now Aradu Nou)
Versec	Versec (now Vršac)
Vinga	Vinga (now Vinga)
Urban counties (törvényhatósági jogú város)
Temesvár (now Timișoara)
Versec (now Vršac)
Urban districts (rendezett tanácsú város)
Fehértemplom (now Bela Crkva)

The towns of Vršac, Bela Crkva, and Kovin are now in Serbia; the other towns mentioned are now in Romania.

== See also ==
- History of Banat
- Declaratory Rescript of the Illyrian Nation

== Sources ==
- Bocşan, Nicolae (2015). "Illyrian privileges and the Romanians from the Banat" (PDF). Banatica. 25: 243–258. Archived from the original on 2 January 2019.
- Ćirković, Sima (2004). The Serbs. Malden: Blackwell Publishing.
- Dabić, Vojin S. (2011). "The Habsburg-Ottoman War of 1716–1718 and Demographic Changes in the War-Afflicted Territories". The Peace of Passarowitz, 1718. West Lafayette: Purdue University Press. pp. 191–208.
- Dávid, Géza (1999). "The Eyalet of temesvár in the Eighteenth Century". Oriente Moderno. 79 (18): 113–128.
- Engel, Pál (2001). The Realm of St. Stephen: A History of Medieval Hungary, 895-1526. London & New York: Tauris.
- Gavrilović, Slavko (1993). "Serbs in Hungary, Slavonia and Croatia in struggles against the Turks (15th–18th centuries)". Serbs in European Civilization. Belgrade: Nova, Serbian Academy of Sciences and Arts, Institute for Balkan Studies. pp. 41–54.
- Gavrilović, Vladan (2023). "The Serbian Vojvodina: Idea and borders until 1918". Istraživanja: Journal of historical researches. 34: 112–120.
- Ilić-Mandić, Jelena (2022). "Making the Border and Frontiersmen: Militarisation in Temeswarer Banat, 1764-1775". From medieval frontiers to early modern borders in Central and South-Eastern Europe. Berlin: Peter Lang Publishing. pp. 207–228.
- Krizman, Bogdan (1970). "The Belgrade Armistice of 13 November 1918". The Slavonic and East European Review. 48 (110): 67–87.
- Pálosfalvi, Tamás (2018). From Nicopolis to Mohács: A History of Ottoman-Hungarian Warfare, 1389-1526. Leiden-Boston: Brill.
- Točanac-Radović, Isidora (2022). "The Great Migration of Serbs and the Question of the Serbian Ethnic and Religious Community in the Habsburg Monarchy". Migrations in the Slavic Cultural Space: From the Middle Ages to the Present Day. Łódź: Łódź University Press. pp. 15–27.
