= Pál Engel =

Hungarian historian

- Born: 27 February 1938; Budapest, Hungary
- Died: 21 August 2001 (aged 63); Budapest, Hungary
- Occupation: Historian

Pál Engel (27 February 1938 – 21 August 2001) was a Hungarian medievalist historian and archivist, and member of the Hungarian Academy of Sciences. He served as General Director of the Library of the Hungarian Academy of Sciences between 1996 and 1997. Engel became a preeminent medievalist despite being an autodidact historian, who had initially obtained only a degree in history and library science (rather than a university doctoral degree in history, which he only obtained later). He also became a member of the Hungarian Academy of Sciences.

== Works ==
- Magyarország világi archontológiája, 1301–1457, I–II. ["Secular Archontology of Hungary, 1301–1457, Volume I–II"]. História, MTA Történettudományi Intézete. Budapest (1996)
- The Realm of St Stephen: A History of Medieval Hungary, 895–1526. I.B. Tauris Publishers (2001)

== Sources ==
- Tringli, István (April 2002). "Megemlékezés". Magyar Tudomány (in Hungarian). www.matud.iif.hu/.
- Karbić, Damir (2001). "In memoriam: Pál Engel (1938.-2001.)". Papers and Proceedings of the Department of Historical Research of the Institute of Historical and Social Research (in Croatian). 19. Croatian Academy of Sciences and Arts. ISSN 1848-896X.
