= Frank Szécsényi =

Hungarian baron (died 1408)

- Lord of Hollókő
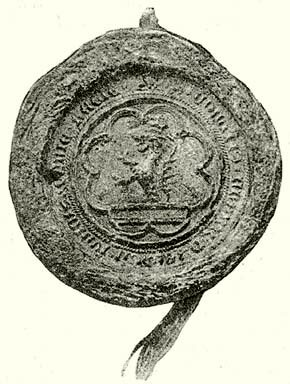
- Seal of Judge royal Frank Szécsényi

Judge royal
- Reign: 1397–1408
- Predecessor: John Pásztói
- Successor: Simon Rozgonyi
- Died: 1408
- Noble family: House of Szécsényi
- Spouses: 1, Catherine Kont; 2, Anne Liszkói
- Issue: (1) Ladislaus II (1) Elizabeth (2) Dorothea (2) Catherine
- Father: Kónya Szécsényi
- Mother: Elizabeth Haschendorfer

Frank Szécsényi (Hungarian: Szécsényi Frank; died 1408), also Francis, was a Hungarian baron and military leader, who was a staunch supporter of King Sigismund of Luxembourg. He participated in various military campaigns against the Ottoman Empire. In 1401, he joined the magnate conspiracy against Sigismund, but returned to the king's allegiance shortly thereafter, retaining his political influence until his death.

== Family ==
Frank was born into the influential Szécsényi family as one of the three sons of Kónya Szécsényi, Ban of Croatia and Elizabeth Haschendorfer, a daughter of Austrian noble Wulfing Haschendorfer from Haschendorf/Hasfalva (today part of Neckenmarkt in Austria). His brothers were Nicholas (last mentioned in 1383) and Simon, also a baron and his strongest ally at political level. The Szécsényi family originated from the Kacsics clan. Frank's grandfather was Thomas Szécsényi, who rose to prominence during King Charles I's war against the oligarchs and received numerous land donations thereafter.

Indicating the social status of his family, Frank Szécsényi married Catherine Kont, the daughter of Nicholas Kont, Palatine of Hungary, who was one of the leading magnates of King Louis I of Hungary. They had two children, Ladislaus II and Elizabeth. After his wife's death, Szécsényi married to Anne Liszkói, the daughter of baron Paul Liszkói, and the widow of Ladislaus Mikcsfi around 1393. The marriage produced two further daughters: Dorothea, who married Stibor II of Stiboricz, and Catherine.

== Career ==
=== Early career ===
His permanent seat was Hollókő Castle, therefore he was frequently mentioned as Frank of Hollókő in contemporary documents. He first appeared in a charter in 1369 as an adult, when he was already legally able to act in possession cases. He was next mentioned in 1372, still without any specific honorary titles or dignities. In the next year, now as magister, he led one of the Hungarian auxiliary troops in Italy to provide assistance to the Carraresi (or da Carrara) family and their paterfamilias Francesco I, Lord of Padua, who fought a fruitless war against his powerful neighbor, the Republic of Venice, also a major enemy of Louis I. Returning home, Szécsényi was appointed ispán of Vas and Sopron Counties in 1374. Beside that he also functioned as castellan of the castle of Kőszeg. He held simultaneously these three positions until 1379. A royal charter from August 1378 also referred to him as ispán of the adjacent Zala County. Szécsényi was listed among the barons of the realm since 1380. He participated in Charles of Durazzo's war against Queen Joanna I of Naples in the first half of 1381. Following the death of Louis I, Szécsényi was made head of Sáros County by Queen Mary, serving in this capacity from 1382 to 1383. He again served as ispán of Vas and Sopron Counties and castellan of Kőszeg in the turbulent years of 1382–86 and as ispán of Zala County in 1383. As a supporter of the Queens against Charles of Durazzo, who claimed the Hungarian throne, in this respect, he was responsible for the protection of southern border at Slavonia against Charles' supporters, who rebelled against the rule of Mary.

=== Sigismund's partisan ===
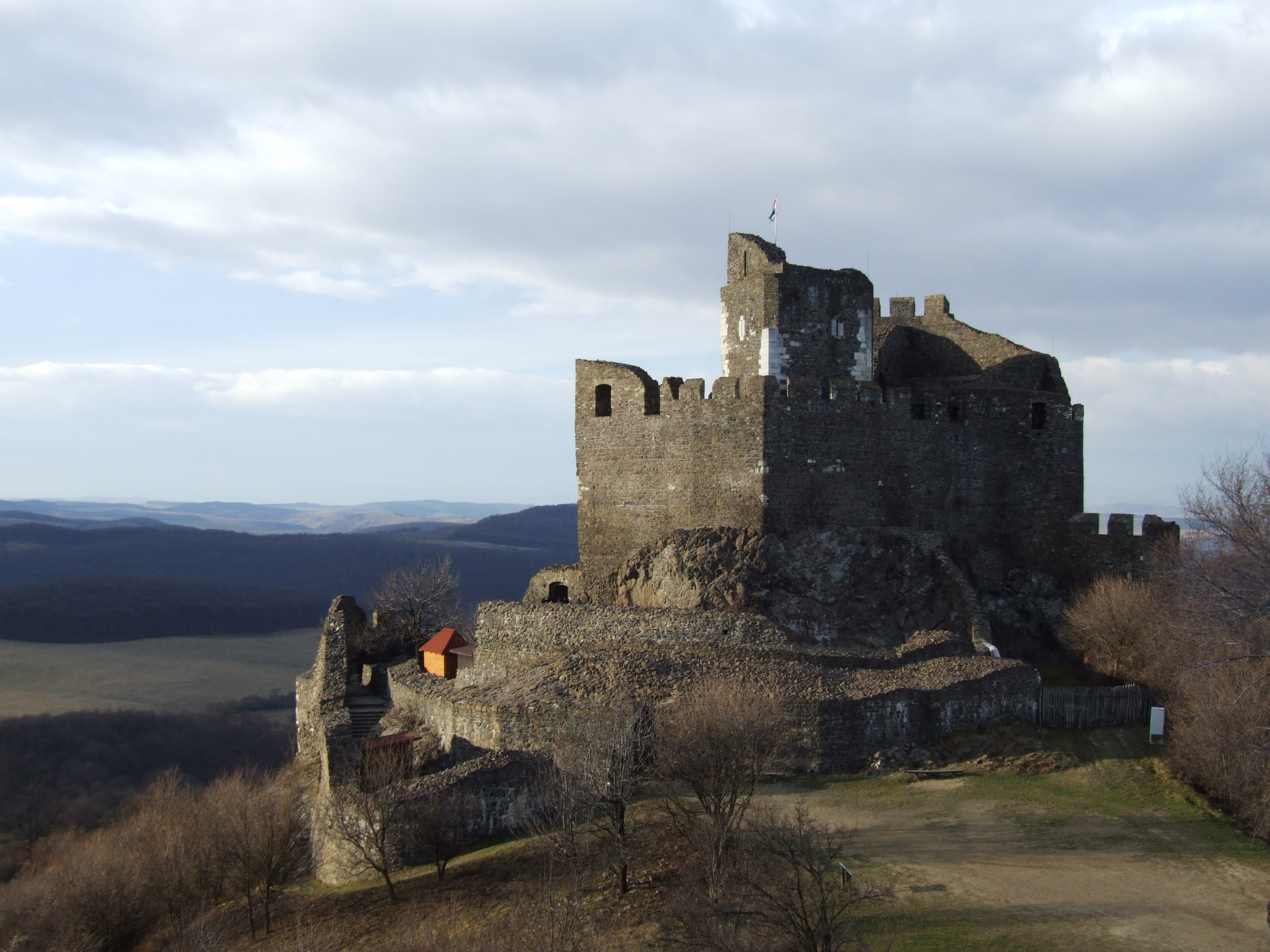
Hollókő Castle, seat of Szécsényi

The Szécsényi brothers were one of the earliest domestic partisans of Sigismund of Luxembourg, who arrived to Hungary to validate the marriage agreement with Queen Mary. Sigismund established a court as Margrave of Brandenburg, after permanently settled in Hungary following the Treaty of Győr. On several occasions, Frank Szécsényi instructed the chancellery's clerks to issue charters. After the queens' capture and imprisonment, Sigismund' influence grew which reached its peak at the rescue of Mary and his coronation as co-ruler on 31 March 1387. For his loyalty, Szécsényi was transferred to the rich urbanized Upper Hungary, where he was installed to the positions of ispán of Zólyom, Hont and Nógrád Counties, serving there until 1390. Beside the ancient family estates in the region, Szécsényi was granted numerous lands and villages by Sigismund in the following years. As lord of the territories, he took an active role in the spread of ideological legitimacy of the relatively unpopular Sigismund. Since the Angevin age, the Saint Ladislaus legend provided the subjects for numerous murals painted in medieval churches in Hungary. Saint Ladislaus I of Hungary, who was the ideal of the perfect monarch, warrior and Christian for that time, was deeply venerated by Sigismund. As donator, Szécsényi ordered the preparation of murals in the churches of Rimabánya, Karaszkó, Kiéte and Rimabrézó (today Rimavská Baňa, Kraskovo, Kyjatice and Rimavské Brezovo in Slovakia, respectively), which depict Biblical scenes or details from the Ladislaus legend. In the latter respect, the figure of Sigismund portrayed Ladislaus, drawing parallels between the two monarchs.

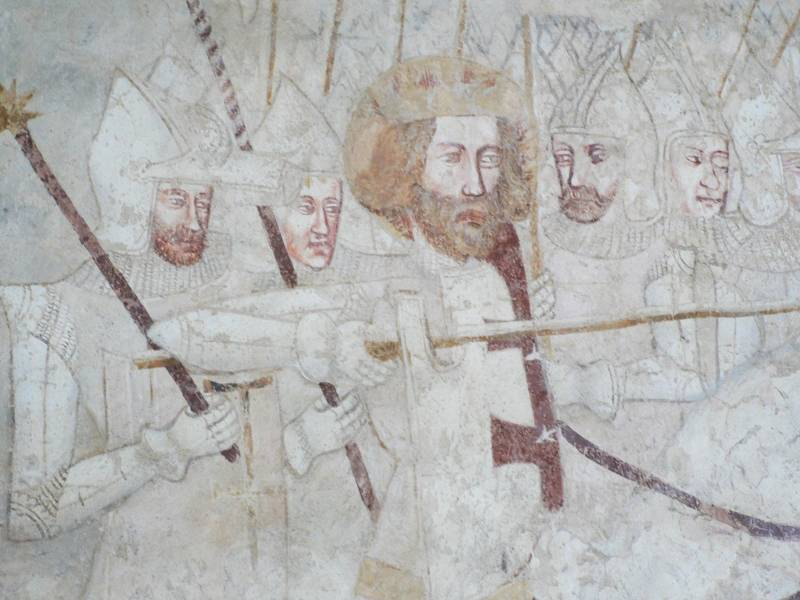
A detail of mural in the Kraskovo church, which depicts the Saint Ladislaus legend with King Sigismund's face; the soldier stands next to him is believed to be donator Frank Szécsényi, who financed the masterpiece

In 1389, Frank and Simon Szécsényi participated in the military campaign to Serbia, which took place after the Battle of Kosovo. Both of them had been involved in the successful sieges of Borač and Čestin forts. Frank functioned as royal treasurer between 1392 and 1393, though he first appeared in this capacity on 10 February 1393. He was also referred to as Judge of the Jassics (Latin: iudex Philisteorum) in August 1393.

Sigismund began to prepare a war against the Ottoman Empire since their Serbian invasion in 1389, which gradually revalued the role of Transylvania as a staging military area for recruitments and border defense. As a result, the king replaced the relatively militarily inexperienced Emeric Bebek with his faithful soldier Frank Szécsényi to the dignity of Voivode of Transylvania in October 1393. Beside that, he also governed Arad County. After a brief visit in December 1393, Szécsényi arrived to the province to stay permanently by early May 1394 from the Diet in Buda, where received instructions from Sigismund. Szécsényi sent a courtly knight Gregory Bethlen to Wallachia to negotiate with Mircea I, who maintained close relations with Sigismund, relying on their common interest in the struggle against Ottoman expansion. After Mircea had to retreat to Hungary following Bayezid's invasion, Sigismund moved to Torda (today Turda in Romania), where Szécsényi convened a general assembly in December 1394 to proclaim and organize insurrectio, the nobles' "uprising" against the Ottomans. Their army crossed the Carpathian Mountains in January 1395 to force loyalty from Stephen I of Moldavia.

Szécsényi financially supported the king's efforts to organize the Crusade of Nicopolis throughout the year. In these months he was with Sigismund in Kronstadt (today Brașov in Romania). After March, Szécsényi was entrusted to prepare the war against the usurper Vlad I of Wallachia as part of the crusade. However Stephen Losonci's army was perished and massacred by the Ottoman–Wallachian troops. Some accused that Szécsényi deliberately did not provide an advance force for personal reasons (formerly the Losoncis plundered his three village at Szolnok in 1390). In the second half of 1395, Szécsényi participated in that campaign which attempted to restore Mircea to the Wallachian throne. Returning home, he was unable to prevent an irregular Ottoman unit to plunder Burzenland in September 1395. Immediately thereafter he was replaced as Voivode by Stibor of Stiboricz, a close friend of King Sigismund.

At the end of the year, Szécsényi went on a pilgrimage to the Holy Land, lasted until spring 1396. He was escorted by former vice-voivode Bartholomew Szobi, who was granted five villages in Somogy County by his travel companion after their homecoming in May 1396. When Sigismund and his royal army left the kingdom for the Crusade of Nicopolis, Szécsényi served as one of the six members of the appointed regent council – along with Master of the treasury Nicholas Kanizsai, Judge royal John Pásztói, comes Stephen Lackfi, Voivode of Rus' John Kaplai and his brother Desiderius Kaplai. Sigismund suffered a catastrophic defeat at Nicopolis. The disaster angered several Hungarian lords, leading to instability in the kingdom. After the emergence of the Kanizsai League and the killing of Stephen Lackfi and his followers in the Bloody Sabor of Križevci, Sigismund appointed his most loyal men to the court dignities, including Szécsényi, who became Judge royal in November 1397. He held the office for eleven years until his death. He was one of the three barons, who stand as a guarantor for the pledged fortune of the Jolsvai family, who tried unsuccessfully to redeem and extricate Leustach Jolsvai, former Palatine of Hungary, who had fallen into Ottoman captivity in the Battle of Nicopolis. In 1401, Szécsényi participated in the conspiracy against Sigismund, who was imprisoned once and deposed twice in those turbulent months. After that he was pardoned and swore loyalty to the king again. Soon he joined the Siklós League, composed of the Garai and Cillei families, who supported Sigismund.

== Sources ==
- Engel, Pál (1996). Magyarország világi archontológiája, 1301–1457, I. [Secular Archontology of Hungary, 1301–1457, Volume I] (in Hungarian). História, MTA Történettudományi Intézete. ISBN 963-8312-44-0.
- Jakó, Zsigmond (1984). "Három erdélyi vajda Zsigmond király korában [Three Voivodes of Transylvania During the Reign of King Sigismund]". In H. Balázs, Éva; Fügedi, Erik; Maksay, Ferenc (eds.). Mályusz Elemér emlékkönyv. Társadalom- és művelődéstörténeti tanulmányok (in Hungarian). Akadémiai Kiadó. pp. 189–207. ISBN 963-05-3272-7.
- Mályusz, Elemér (1984). Zsigmond király uralma Magyarországon, 1387–1437 [The Rule of King Sigismund in Hungary, 1387–1437] (in Hungarian). Gondolat. ISBN 963-281-414-2.
- Markó, László (2006). A magyar állam főméltóságai Szent Istvántól napjainkig: Életrajzi Lexikon [Great Officers of State in Hungary from King Saint Stephen to Our Days: A Biographical Encyclopedia] (in Hungarian). Helikon Kiadó. ISBN 963-208-970-7.
- Pető, Zsuzsa (2012). "Kincses Felvidék – középkori templomok a Rima völgyében [The Treasures of Upper Hungary – Medieval churches in Gömör]". Várak, kastélyok, templomok. 8 (5): 18–21.
- Soós, Ferenc (1999). Magyarország kincstartói, 1340–1540 [The royal purse-bearers of Hungary, 1340–1540] (in Hungarian). Argumentum. ISBN 963-446-118-2.

Frank House of Szécsényi Born: ? Died: 1408
Political offices
Preceded by George Jakcs	Royal treasurer 1392–1393	Succeeded by Frank Szécsi
Preceded by Emeric Bebek	Voivode of Transylvania; 1393–1395	Succeeded by Stibor of Stiboricz
Preceded by John Pásztói	Judge royal 1397–1408	Succeeded by Simon Rozgonyi
