= Ladislaus Szécsényi =

Hungarian noble (1413–1460)

Ladislaus (III) Szécsényi

Ispán of Nógrád and Hont
- Reign: 1440–1460
- Predecessor: George Szentgyörgyi
- Successor: Albert Losonci & Michael Ország
- Born: 1413
- Died: 1460 (aged 46–47)
- Buried: Szécsény
- Noble family: House of Szécsényi
- Spouse: Barbara Rozgonyi
- Issue: John; Hedwig; Catherine; Anne
- Father: Ladislaus II Szécsényi
- Mother: Anne Szécsi

Ladislaus (III) Szécsényi (Hungarian: Szécsényi (III.) László; 1413–1460), was a Hungarian landowner and nobleman, who served as ispán of Nógrád and Hont Counties from 1440 until his death. He was the last male member of the once powerful and prestigious Szécsényi family.

== Family ==
Ladislaus III was born into the Szécsényi family, which originated from the Kacsics kindred and had large estates in mostly Nógrád and Hont counties. He was the only child of Ladislaus II and Anne Szécsi. His grandparents were notable barons Frank Szécsényi and Peter Szécsi ("the Prince"). Feeling the nearness of his death, paterfamilias Simon Szécsényi (brother of the late Frank) concluded an inheritance contract with his nephew Ladislaus II (son of Frank) on 9 December 1411 in Letkés. Accordingly, his son Nicholas would be the sole heir of Salgó Castle (Börzsöny), which was acquired by Simon alone decades earlier, while Tapolcsány (today Topoľčany, Slovakia) belonged to Frank's branch. Hollókő and Ajnácskő (today Hajnáčka, Slovakia) were classified to Ladislaus (Frank's son) and Nicholas (Simon's son), respectively, while those accessaries (villages and lands) were shared between the two branches. The remaining two castles (Somoskő and Bene) and the surrounding villages became a joint family property, while both branches had to appoint an own castellan, simultaneously. Simon Szécsényi died soon in January 1412. A year later Ladislaus II died suddenly and Nicholas became owner of the whole Szécsényi property. As Ladislaus did not mention his namesake son in his last will and testament, it is presumable that Ladislaus III was born posthumously in the year of 1413, as his deceased father was not aware of pregnancy. The infant Ladislaus grew up in the court of Nicholas Szécsényi at Salgó Castle, along with his mother Anne Szécsi. Under such conditions, Ladislaus III, who was first mentioned in 1414, did not receive his rightful heritage.

== Biography ==
In 1424, Nicholas Szécsényi was condemned for coin counterfeiting, and consequently King Sigismund confiscated all of his estates. Mainz citizen Eberhard Windecke also claimed that Nicholas was responsible for the death of Ladislaus' namesakefather, accusing him of poisoning, but contemporary official documents do not confirm this assumption. Historian Pál Engel argued in favour of Nicholas' innocence all the charges brought, as the relatives most immediately affected in the two trials (in 1345, Nicholas was exiled for alleged adultery) did not believe the charges. Ladislaus also retained his relationship with Nicholas, who raised him during his childhood. He even tried to pass the castle of Hegyesd as a titular pledge to the penniless Nicholas, which he inherited through maternal side in 1426, however Simon Rozgonyi, Bishop of Veszprém and his brothers reported his intention to the royal court. As a result, Sigismund, who has been abroad for years, forbaded to Ladislaus to donate the fort to his relative, in his letter written on 25 September 1433 in Mantua, while travelled to the Council of Basel. Sigismund added Ladislaus could pledge the castle only to the Rozgonyis, in accordance with his instruction. It happened even in that year, Hegyesd Castle became a property of the Rozgonyis.

Since the 1430s, Ladislaus Szécsényi gradually gained his inheritance. He took Páka fort, Zala County from his mother Anne Szécsi in 1431. Peter Cseh of Léva handed over the half of the originally Hussite-fort Nagytapolcsány (today Veľké Topoľčany, Slovakia) to him in exchange for the half of Tapolcsány Castle in May 1434. In 1439, he was granted significant portions by King Albert from Nicholas Szécsényi's confiscated wealth. The 21 villages, which belonged to the Ajnácskő lordship partly or fully, in addition to a half of Rimaszombat (today Rimavská Sobota, Slovakia) were donated to Ladislaus Szécsényi. However the castle itself was granted to the Pálóci family. The King also returned the half of lands Szécsény and its belonging villages Almás and Sztracin to Ladislaus in the same year. Half of the viage of Csuda in Bars County became Ladislaus Szécsényi's property too by 1435. A confession from a 1446 trial claimed there was a counterfeit document during the trial of Nicholas Szécsényi in 1424, which falsified in favour of Ladislaus to prevent the confiscation of the Szécsényi fortune. The document suggested that Simon and Frank received a privilege earlier that was not possible to confiscate the wealth due infidelity, since the other branch had to inherit it. There is no source that Ladislaus ever had used this fake. In 1438, Nicholas Szécsényi died unmarried and childless in exile. He made Ladislaus as heir of his virtually existed fortune (as considered himself to be their owner), leaving his all castles, towns and villages in Hungary to him, except Szakall, which he donated to the local Benedictine monastery, which had to be re-established, and asked Ladislaus to do the same with his own half. Much of the wealth and money, on which Nicholas Szécsényi counted in his last will and testament, proved to be a fiction in fact. According to the document, Nicholas bequeathed to Ladislaus all his "castles, small towns, villages and all other immovable property", in addition to 10 percent of his money. However, he commissioned his relatives to perform tasks. In addition, Ladislaus had to pay 1,1000 ducats to acquire all the official documents concerning the landholdings, and he also had to take care of Nicholas' familiares and household. Ladislaus was unable to meet these expectations, which would have resulted in significant expenditure expense. Albeit he sent a Franciscan friar to Venice, where his deceased relative spent his exile years, but after that he learned that he gained nothing, as Nicholas had bequeathed to him lands he no longer owned.

From 1440 until his death, Ladislaus Szécsényi served as ispán of Nógrád and Hont counties. His term was characterized by the Hussites' permanent invasions into Upper Hungary, including the two aforementioned counties, who constantly looted the villages and plundered the region. In the 1440s, John Jiskra's mercenaries captured several castles of Szécsényi, including Tapolcsány. Amid such a situation, he supported Władysław III of Poland's claim to the Hungarian throne during the civil war, which broke out after Albert's death. He was a member of the Estates of the realm, which offered the crown to the Polish king in March 1440. Szécsényi participated in several assemblies of the Diet of Hungary in that year. He was a leading figure of the pro-Władysław league in the Upper Hungary region. The local nobles concluded their first two armistices with Queen Elizabeth's mercenaries Hasko Schellendorf then John Jiskra in his estates Szécsény and Hollókő on 9 October 1441 and 17 September 1442, respectively. In September 1443 at Nowa Wieś Spiska, Szécsényi was among the lords, who signed an armistice with John Jiskra, de facto ruler of Upper Hungary and a partisan of the infant Ladislaus the Posthumous. Szécsényi's wealth suffered the constant warfare, thus he pledged his several landholdings as loan security in the following years. Nevertheless, he remained an influential lord in the region: regent John Hunyadi concluded a peace with Jiskra in his estate of Rimaszombat in 1146. Among others, Hunyadi obliged the Czech mercenary to return Tapolcsány Castle to Szécsényi. In 1451, John Hunyadi ordered to fortify his permanent seat Szécsény, which absorbed considerable amounts.

== Later life ==
Szécsényi married Barbara Rozgonyi, a daughter of Judge royal George Rozgonyi. They had four children. Their only son John died in December 1454, leaving no heirs. Among their three daughters, Hedwig married Albert Losonci, while Anne was betrothed to John Ország, son of Palatine Michael Ország. Anne was still mentioned as a living person in 1484, when she married for the second time to John Pető de Gerse. Szécsényi's third daughter Catherine was mentioned only once in 1437.

The wars with the Hussites brought Szécsényi financially difficult situation. He and his son John appeared before the Convention of Ipolyság (today Šahy, Slovakia) on 27 October 1454, when they pledged a considerable part of the Szécsényi wealth (for instance, Hollókő, Szécsény, Gyöngyös and Pata) for sixteen thousand florins to his son-in-law Albert Losonci. His only son John predeceased him in December 1454. Still in that year, the mourning father made a declaration at Ipolyság, which contained if he dies without male heirs, his two surviving daughters, Hedwig and Anne will inherit his wealth after their promotion to the status of a nobleman's son. Following that Michael Ország betrothed his son to the still maiden Anne. On 27 April 1455, Ladislaus Szécsényi pledged his several lands to his relatives Michael Ország and Albert Losonci, who shared the Szécsényi property, after Szécsényi was unable to repay that large sums which he borrowed for years from them to finance the mercenaries against the Hussites. Three days later, on 30 April, he signed a heritage contract with his two living daughters at the Buda chapter, where he resigned from all jurisdictions. The charter did not contain that clause which would have made the contract binding for an unexisting male heir. King Ladislaus V granted the status of a son to Hedwig and Anne on 28 October 1456.

Ladislaus Szécsényi died in 1460 as the last male member of the once powerful Szécsényi family, which flourished since the 1310s, founded by his great-great-grandfather, the influential baron Thomas Szécsényi. He was buried on 3 April 1460 in Szécsény. His funeral was attended by his extensive kinship, including Palatine Michael Ország, Judge royal Ladislaus Pálóci and Albert Losonci, Szécsényi's son-in-law and successor as ispán of Nógrád County. The wealth of the Szécsényi fortune was shared between the Ország and Losonci families in the following years.

== Sources ==
- C. Tóth, Norbert; Horváth, Richárd; Neumann, Tibor; Pálosfalvi, Tamás; W. Kovács, András (2017). Magyarország világi archontológiája, 1458–1526, II. Megyék [Secular Archontology of Hungary, 1458–1526, Volume II: Counties] (in Hungarian). MTA Bölcsészettudományi Kutatóközpont Történettudományi Intézete. ISBN 978-963-4160-85-4.
- Dvořáková, Daniela (2012). "Nicholas of Szécsény and Salgó – an exceptional man at the court of Sigismund of Luxembourg (A contribution to the court culture and functioning of the court of the King of Hungary at the beginning of the 15th century)". Historický časopis. 60 (Supplement): 3–18.
- Engel, Pál (1992). "Salgai Miklós [Nicholas of Salgó]". Levéltári Közlemények (in Hungarian). 63 (1–2). National Archives of Hungary: 15–26.
- Engel, Pál (1996). Magyarország világi archontológiája, 1301–1457, I. [Secular Archontology of Hungary, 1301–1457, Volume I] (in Hungarian). História, MTA Történettudományi Intézete. ISBN 963-8312-44-0.
- Kollmann, Örs László (2001). "Rimaszombat középkori története [The Medieval History of Rimaszombat]". In Neumann, Tibor (ed.). Analecta Mediaevalia I. Tanulmányok a középkorról (in Hungarian). Argumentum Kiadó. pp. 113–153. ISBN 963-446-174-3.
- Novák, Ádám (2016). "Hadi események és résztvevői a Felső Részeken 1440 és 1445 között. – Azok a bizonyos "zavaros idők"". In Pósán, László; Veszprémy, László (eds.). Elfeledett háborúk. Középkori csaták és várostromok (6–16. század) (in Hungarian). Zrínyi Kiadó. pp. 310–330. ISBN 978-963-3276-96-9.

Ladislaus III House of Szécsényi Born: 1413 Died: 1460
Political offices
Preceded by George Szentgyörgyi	Ispán of Nógrád and Hont; 1440–1460	Succeeded by Albert Losonci & Michael Ország
