= Madonna De Surdis =

Altarpiece from the 1380s by a Venetian workshop

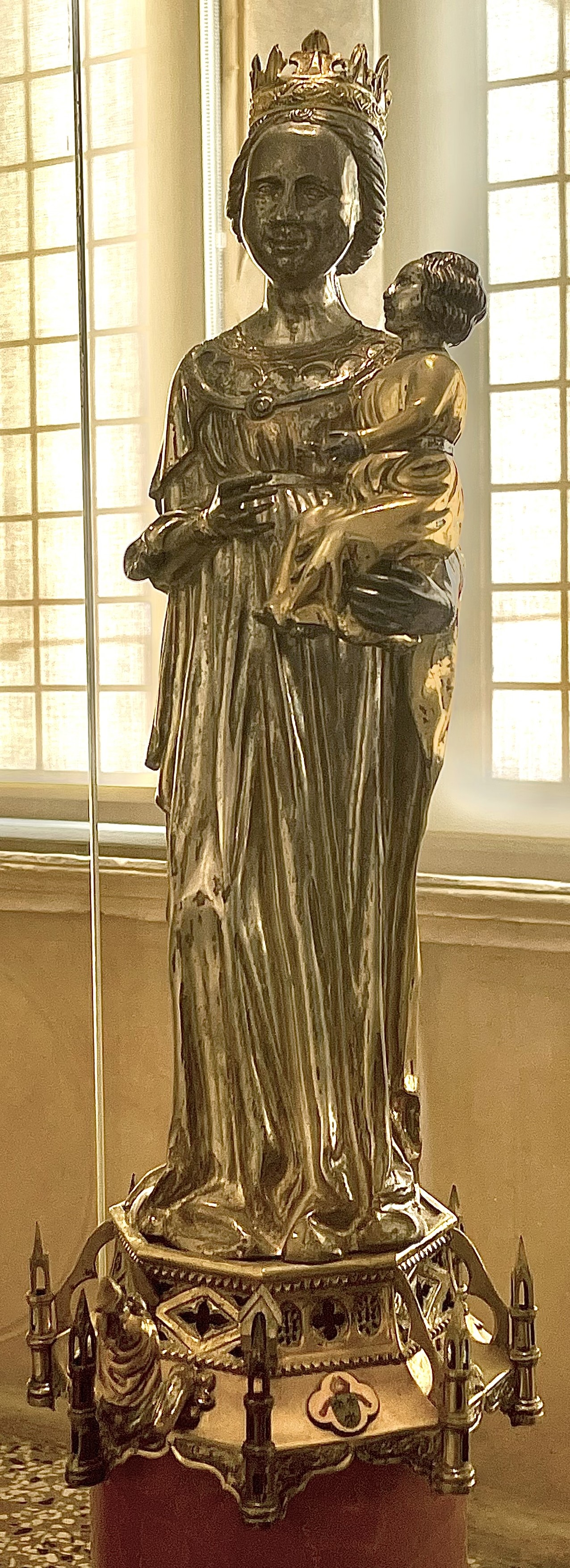
- The Madonna De Surdis displayed in the Museo diocesano of Vicenza.
- Artist: Unknown
- Year: 1380s
- Medium: Gilded Silver
- Subject: Mary and Christ child
- Dimensions: 54 cm × 21 cm (21 in × 8.3 in)
- Location: Museo Diocesano, Vicenza

Madonna De Surdis is a silver-gilt altarpiece from the 1380s. Though the artist remains unknown, it is believed to have been created in a Venetian workshop. The piece was commissioned by Giovanni De Surdis, the former bishop of Vicenza. A will from 1383, belonging to the Bishop, indicates that 50 gold ducats were allocated for the creation of a Madonna statue to be placed on the altar of Santa Maria in the Vicenza Cathedral. The statue is held at the Museo Diocesano in Vicenza.

== History ==
=== Commissioning ===
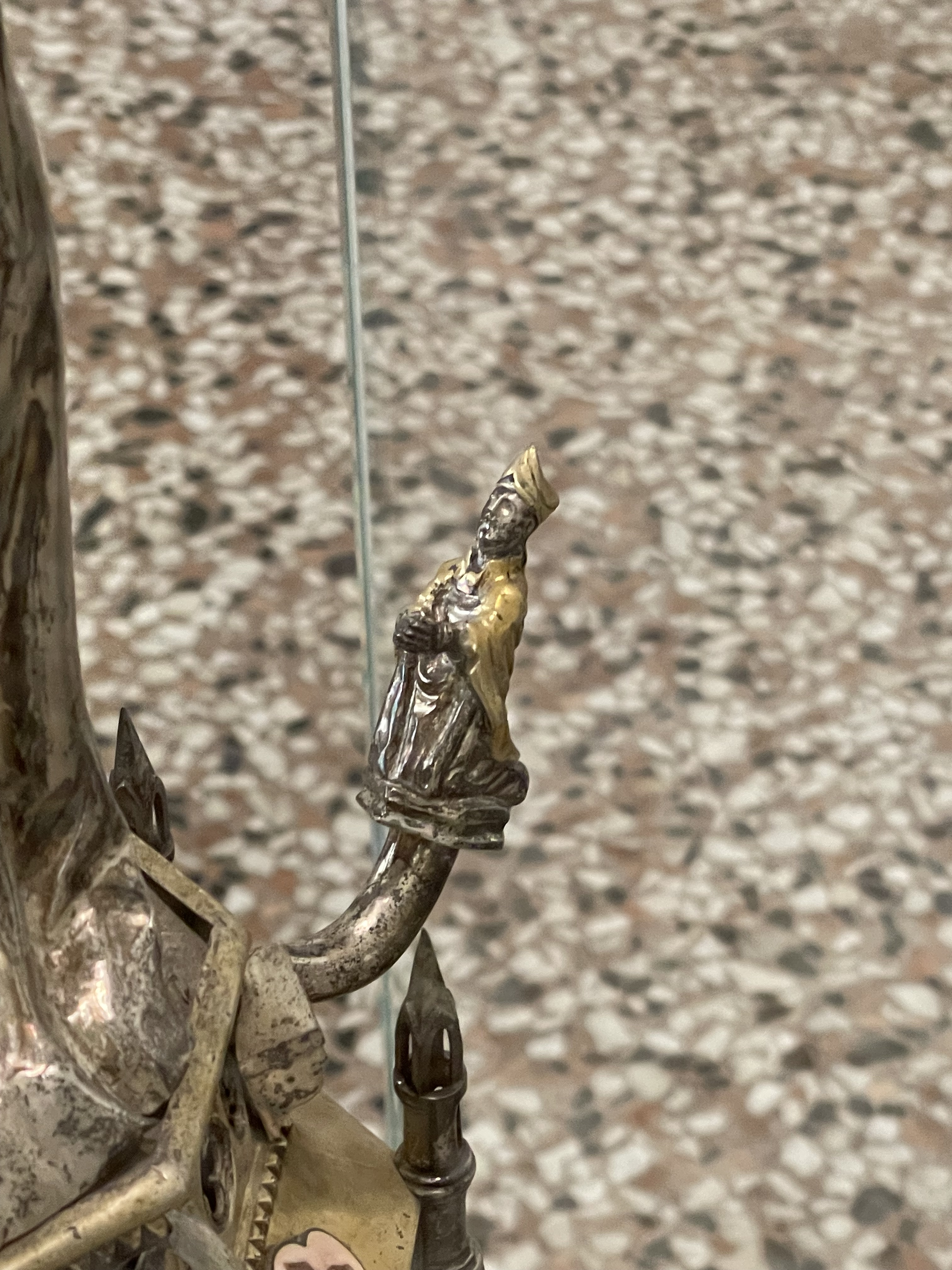
The commissioner, bishop Giovanni De Surdis kneling in front of the Virgin Mary and Christ child

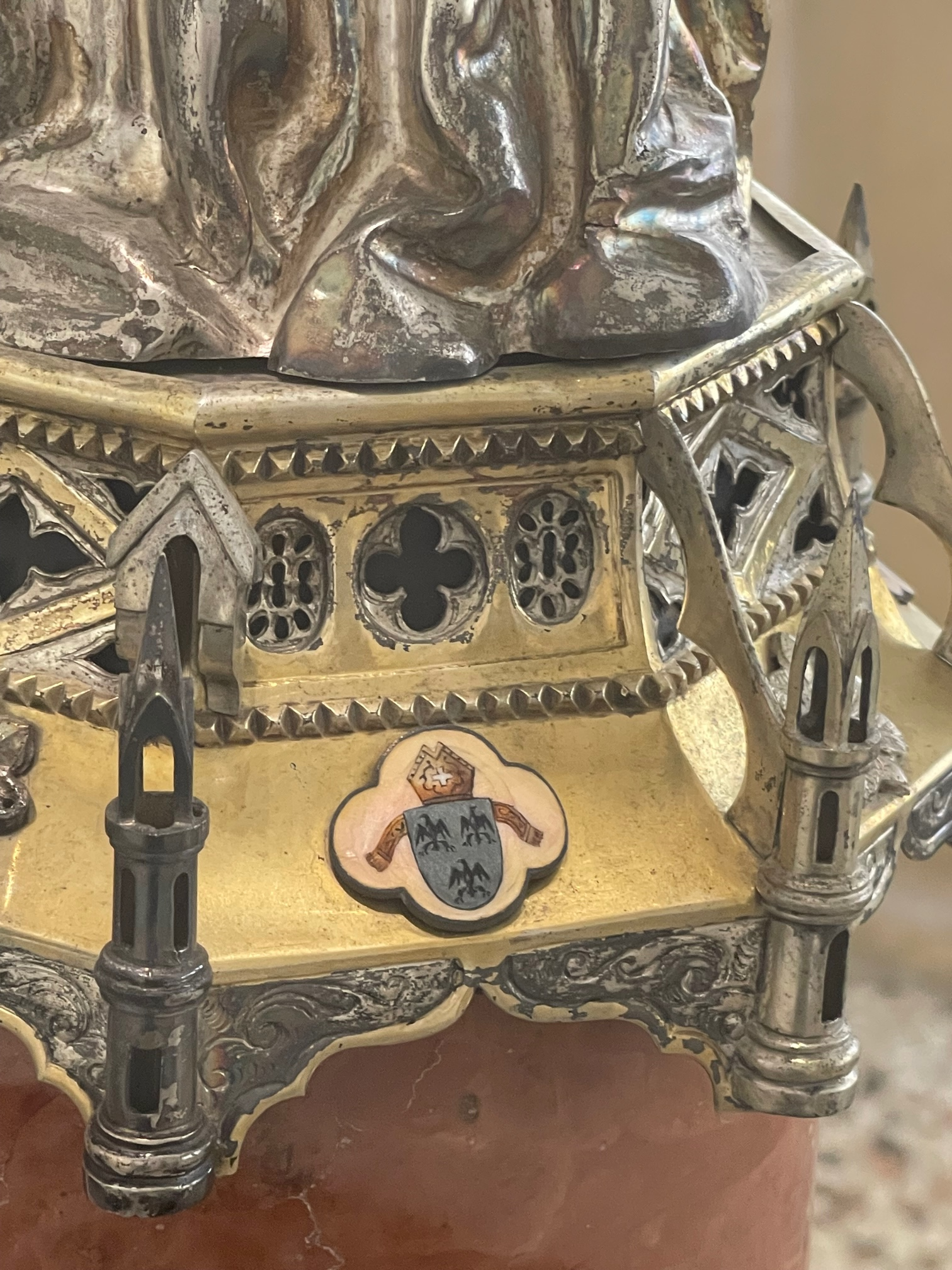
The De Surdis family's coat of arms. It is displayed four times around the octagonal base

Giovanni de Surdis was appointed bishop of Vicenza in 1362, serving until 1386. In his 1383 testament, he allocated 500 gold ducats for the construction of a chapel in Vicenza's Santa Maria Cathedral, dedicated to St. Jerome. He also bequeathed 50 gold ducats for the creation of a silver statue of the Virgin Mary to be placed on the altar where the daily Mass of the Virgin was celebrated. The chapel funded by Giovanni de Surdis no longer exists, as it was converted into an atrium of the sacristy in the 15th century.

=== Restoration ===
An inventory from Vicenza Cathedral dating back to 1447, the oldest found, describes the statue as a silver figure of Santa Maria holding her son, with three smaller statues beneath depicting a bishop, St. James, and St. Lucy.

A mid-17th-century inventory describes the statue as a silver-gilt Madonna holding a silver child, with a bishop at her feet, bearing a coat of arms with three eagles. It notes defects in two castle turrets and the absence of two coats of arms and four counter castles. There are no mentions of either of the aforementioned saints.

Currently, the statue includes one small figure of a bishop and eight surrounding towers. The inventories reflect various modifications to the statute over time, but the dates and identities of those responsible for the alterations remain unclear.

The statue has undergone modern restorations, and some features are reported missing. It is theorized that the Madonna's open right arm originally held an apple. The original eight towers have been reworked, as noted in historical inventories.

=== Preservation ===
The statue is currently displayed in the Museo Diocesano in Vicenza. Here it is placed with other sacred metalwork connected to the Diocese of Vicenza. It is inside a glass cylinder and is visible from all sides.

== Description ==
Madonna De Surdis is a gilded silver statue of Madonna holding the Christ child in her left arm, with her right hand open. She is standing on an octagonal base, adorned with several gothic features.The base consists of eight spires, three heraldic roses, six quatrefoils, and four coat of arms, and expresses a late medieval iconography.

The coat of arms is a blue shield with three eagles and a mitre on top. This represents the Bishop. In addition to this, On a small projecting arm directly in front of the Virgin is the small image of Bishop Giovanni de Surdis, the commissioner of the work, with a miter on his head, on his knees and with his hands together.

The Madonna is adorned with a crown and wears a draped garment featuring Renaissance-style design. The neckline and sleeves are finely decorated in the Renaissance fashion. Scholars suggest that the artist was influenced by northern European styles, citing the dress as evidence. According to the Vicenza register of goldsmiths from that period, foreign goldsmiths were active in the area, indicating that the artist might have had a non-Venetian background.

=== Iconography ===
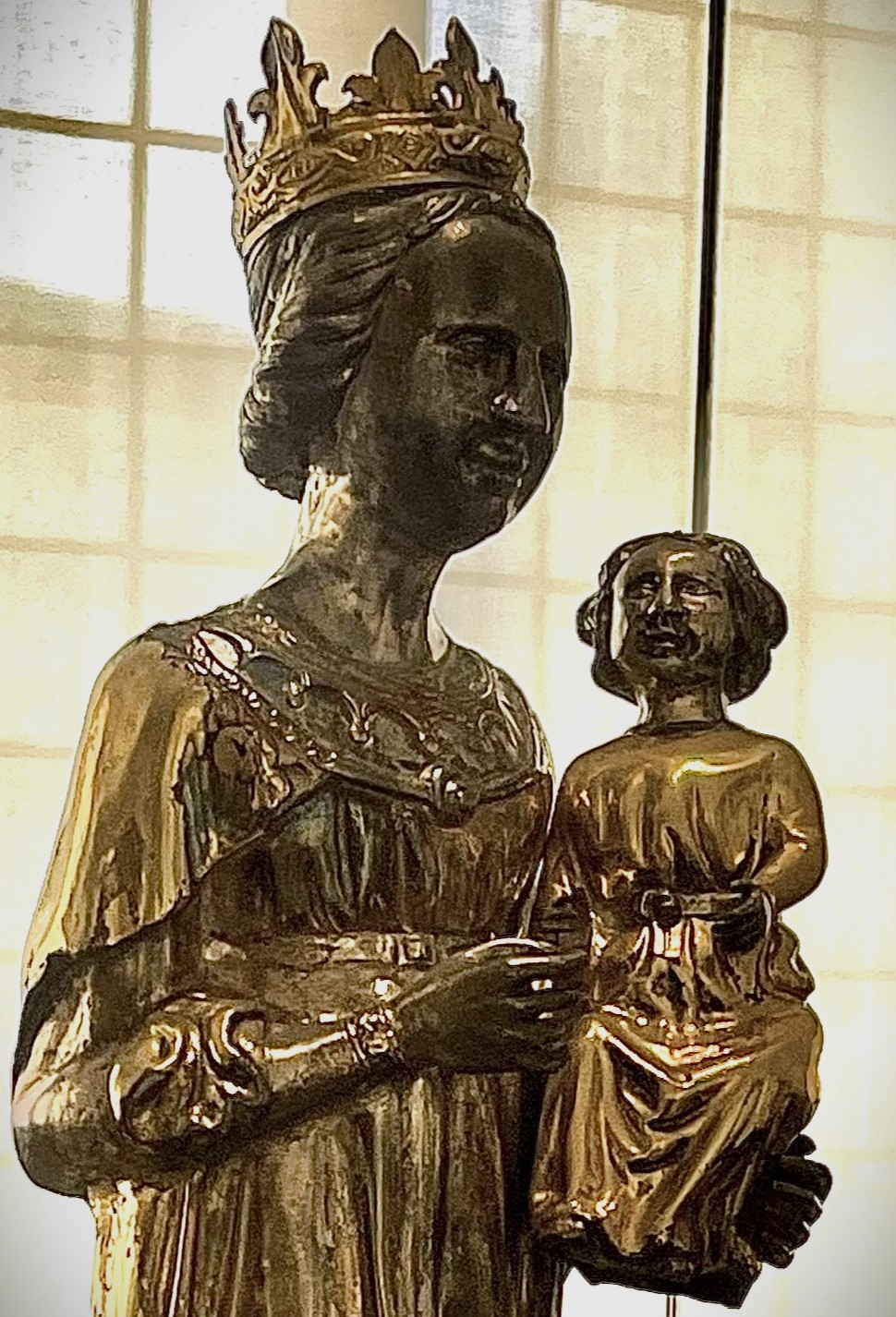
Madonna De Surdis adorned with a crown, holding the Christ child

Mary and Child is a common theme in Christian iconography, but the different postures of the figures in various artworks can lead to different interpretations. In the Madonna De Surdis, Mary is depicted as the Queen of Heaven, adorned with a crown and standing tall, signifying her importance.

The rose symbolizes Mary and her purity, often associated with her role as the Queen of Heaven. This symbolism is evident in the four heraldic roses that decorate the base of the statue.

A Gothic spire, historically a symbol of heavenly aspirations in medieval times, surrounds the bishop and his coat of arms at the base of the statue. This suggests that the bishop is a significant figure in the composition.

Scholars have proposed that Mary's open hand was meant to offer Jesus an apple, based on similar iconography from the same period. It is also suggested that Jesus is welcoming the apple with open arms, symbolizing Jesus as the new Adam.

== See also ==
- Roman Catholic Diocese of Vicenza
- Scaliger
- Goldsmith
- 1476 Altarpiece
