= Dénes Szécsi =

Hungarian prelate and cardinal

His Eminence Dénes Szécsi
- Cardinal Archbishop of Esztergom; Primate of Hungary
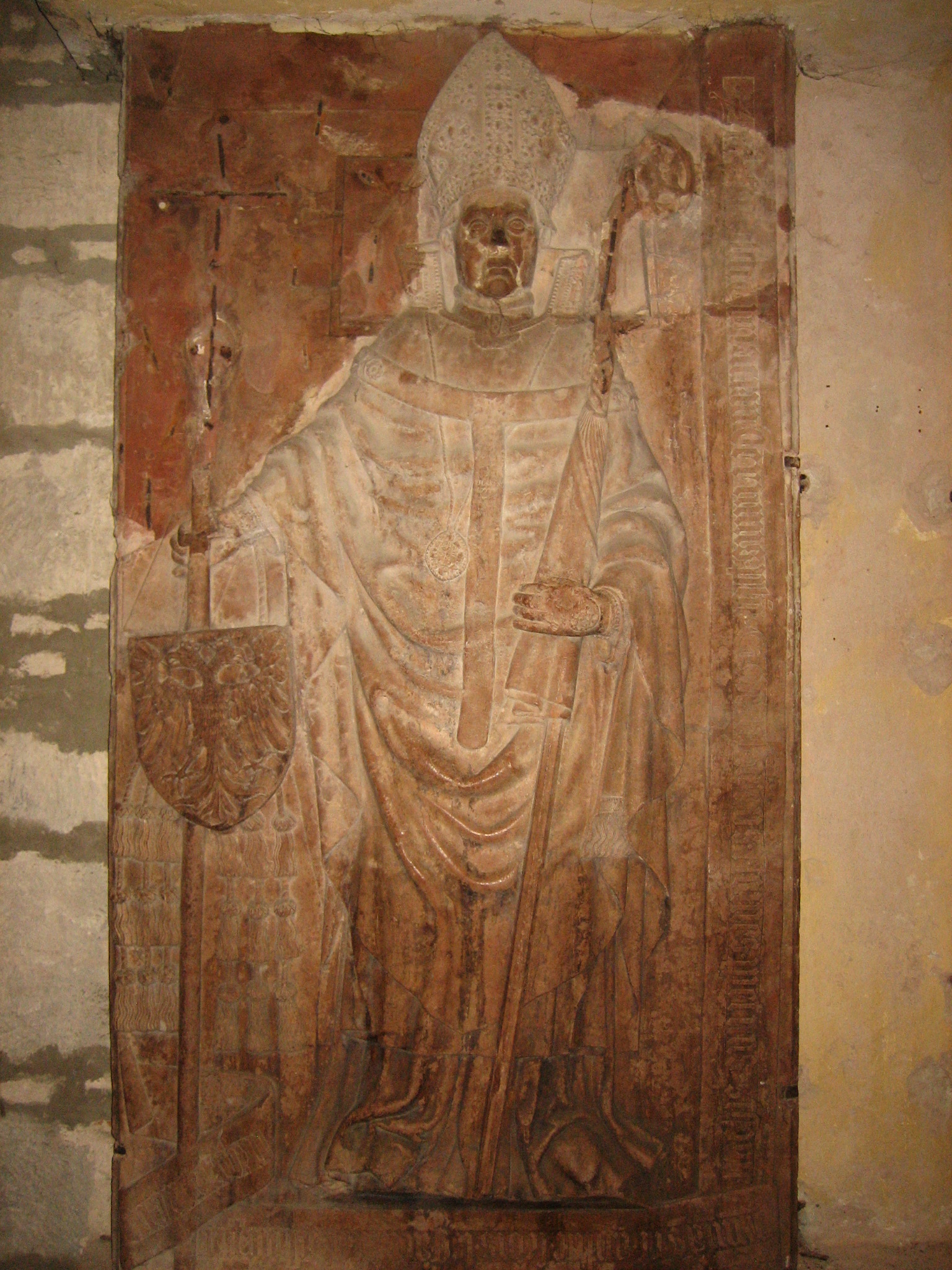
- Archdiocese: Esztergom
- Installed: January 8, 1440
- Term ended: February 1, 1465
- Predecessor: György Pálóczi
- Successor: János Vitéz
- Previous posts: Bishop of Nyitra (1438–1439); Bishop of Eger (1438–1439)

Orders
- Created cardinal: 18 December 1439
- Rank: Primate

Personal details
- Born: c. 1410 Felsőlendva, Kingdom of Hungary (today: Grad, Slovenia)
- Died: February 1, 1465 Esztergom, Kingdom of Hungary
- Denomination: Catholic
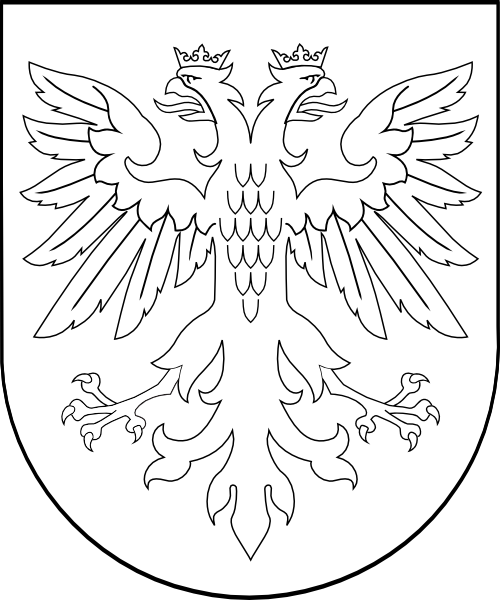
- Coat of arms

Dénes Szécsi de Felsőlendva (or Széchy; c. 1410 – 1 February 1465) was a Hungarian prelate and cardinal, who served as Archbishop of Esztergom from 1440 to 1465. He was the first Primate of Hungary since 1452 when donated the title and rights by Pope Nicholas V.

== Career ==
He was born into a magnate family as the son Nicholas Szécsi, Jr., son of Palatine Nicholas Szécsi and Helen Garay, daughter of Nicholas I Garay. He studied at the University of Vienna from 1426 and the University of Bologna from 1433 where he became a doctor of Canon law. He also studied at the University of Padua.

Szécsi was appointed Bishop of Nyitra (Nitra) on 2 March 1438. Pope Eugene IV confirmed him in that position on 20 April, however Szécsi was later elected Bishop of Eger on 5 July 1438. After the death of King Albert, he supported his widow, Elizabeth of Luxembourg. As a result, he was promoted to the cardinalate on 18 December 1439 at the request of the Queen. His titular church (titulus ecclesiae) was the San Ciriaco alle Terme Diocleziane.

He became archbishop of Esztergom on 8 January 1440. In this capacity, he crowned the infant Ladislaus the Posthumous with the Holy Crown of Hungary on 15 May 1440. However, shortly afterward he joined the league of Vladislaus I, whom he crowned on 17 July 1440 with a crown from Saint Stephen's reliquary.

Vladislaus I was killed at the Battle of Varna in 1444. He supported John Hunyadi in the evolving power struggles. He vigorously attacked the Hussites in accordance with Hunyadi's policy. He served as chancellor from May 1453 to May 1463. Matthias Corvinus was crowned by him on 25 March 1464.

As a cardinal, he did not participate in the papal conclaves which elected Nicholas V (1447), Callixtus III (1455), Pius II (1458) and Paul II (1464). He held a provincial synod as archbishop of Esztergom in 1450 where he urged the restoration of monastic discipline and the institution of celibacy. In 1452 he received the title of Primate of Hungary from Pope Nicholas V. He also became envoy to the Holy See. He rebuilt the old Esztergom Basilica and donated 8,000 Florins in 1453. His oratorical ability was outstanding. He was buried in the cathedral which was renovated by him.

== Sources ==
- Markó, László: A magyar állam főméltóságai Szent Istvántól napjainkig – Életrajzi Lexikon p. 329. (The High Officers of the Hungarian State from Saint Stephen to the Present Days – A Biographical Encyclopedia) (2nd edition); Helikon Kiadó Kft., 2006, Budapest; ISBN 963-547-085-1.

Catholic Church titles
Preceded by György Pálóczi	Archbishop of Esztergom; 8 January 1440 – 1 February 1465	Succeeded by János Vitéz
