= Grad, Grad =

Village in Slovenia

Grad Gornja Lendava (until 1952)
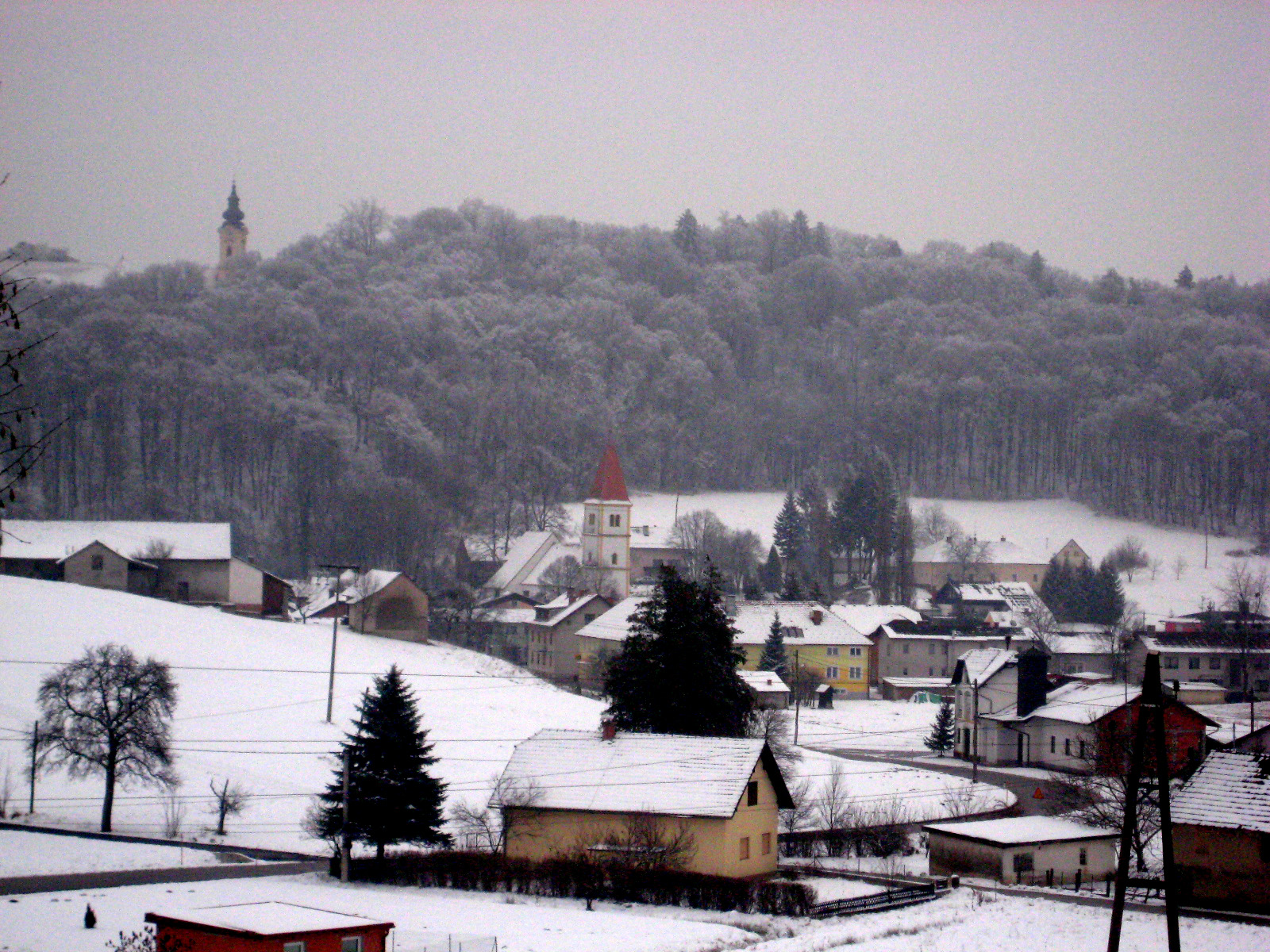
- The settlement of Grad

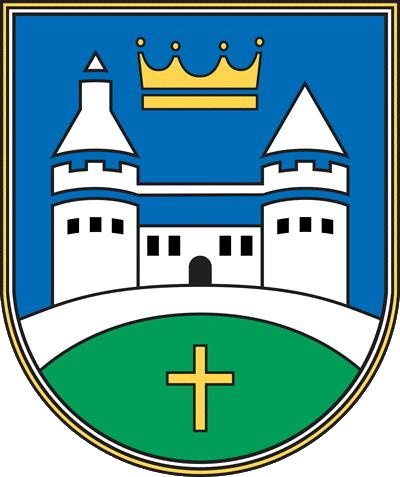
- Flag Coat of arms

- Location in Slovenia
- Coordinates: 46°47′51.72″N 16°5′54.08″E
- Country: Slovenia
- Traditional region: Prekmurje
- Statistical region: Mura
- Municipality: Grad
- Elevation: 343.6 m (1,127 ft)

Population (2020)
  - Total: 620
- Postal code: 9264

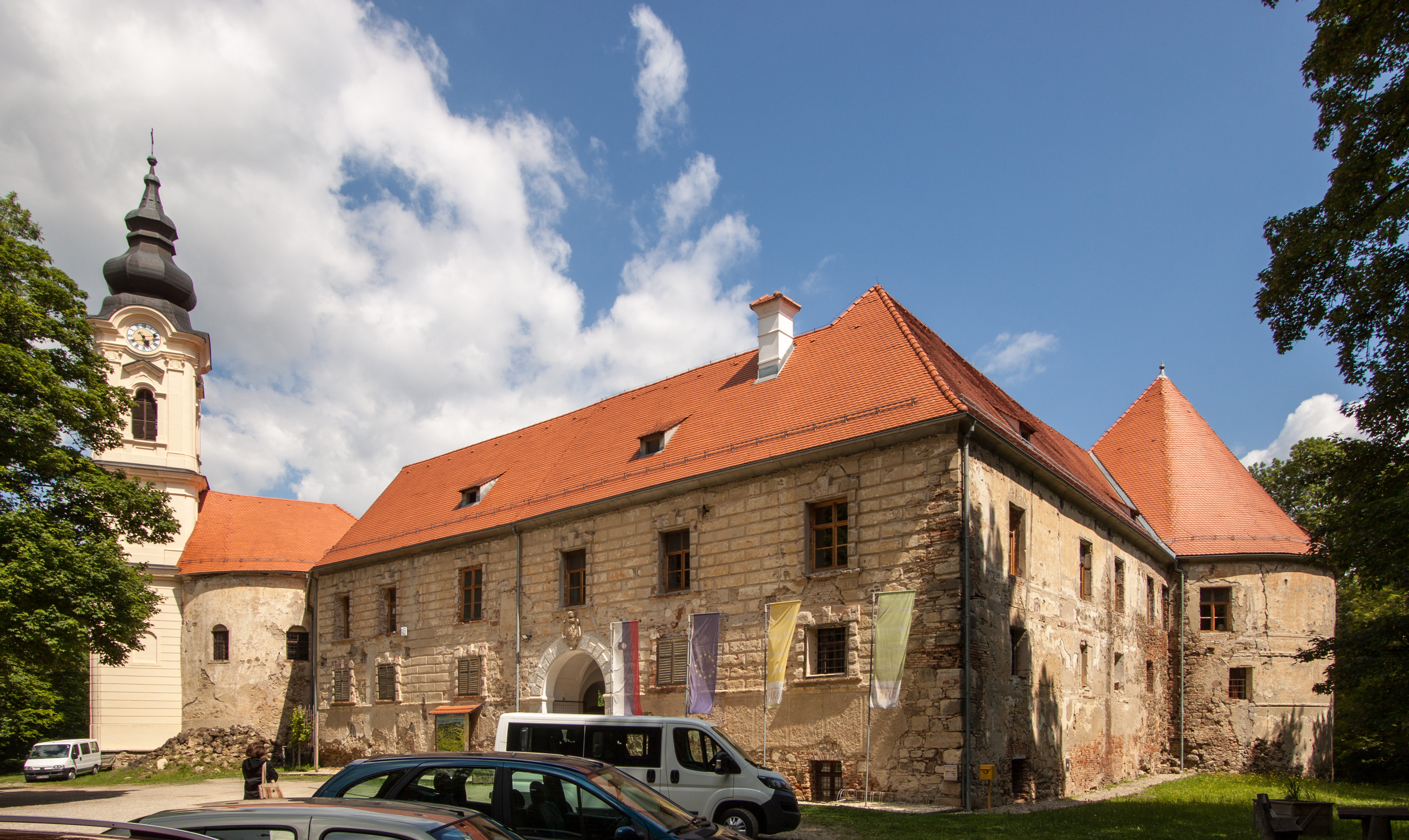
Grad castle

Grad (pronounced [ˈɡɾaːt]; formerly Gornja Lendava, Hungarian: Felsőlendva) is a village in the Municipality of Grad in the Prekmurje region of northeastern Slovenia. It is the seat of the municipality and is the largest and oldest settlement in the Goričko region.

== Name ==
Grad was first mentioned in written sources as Lyndwa, and later as Gornja Lendava (literally 'upper Lendava', contrasting with Dolnja Lendava, literally 'lower Lendava'). The name of the settlement was changed from Gornja Lendava to Grad in 1952.

== Grad Castle ==
Grad means 'castle' in Slovene and refers to the large castle strategically situated on a hill of basalt tuff overlooking the settlement. The castle developed from a medieval fortress, the existence of which was first documented in records from 1275, when King Ladislaus IV of Hungary donated it to Amadeus Gutkeled. However, archaeological excavations have proven the existence of a building as early as the 11th century. It is one of the largest castle complexes in Slovenia, with 365 rooms. Amadeus' descendants, the Felsőlendvai family possessed the castle until their extinction around 1358.

The Hungarian noble family Széchy owned the castle between 1365 and 1685. Under their rule, the castle was extensively expanded. It reached its current size over the course of the 16th and 17th centuries. From 1730, the estate was administered by Austrian nobleman Franz Leopold von Nádasdy. It was acquired by Moritz, Prince of Dietrichstein in 1856 and subsequently changed ownership several times. After World War II, the castle was nationalized by the government of the Socialist Federal Republic of Yugoslavia and was used by municipal offices and an agricultural cooperative. Between 1960 and 1995, the castle was left to decay.

In 1999, it was declared a cultural heritage of state importance and restoration efforts were started. With Slovenia joining the European Union, funds have been made available for the restoration of the castle. Since 2003, the administrative offices of the Goričko Nature Park have been housed here. Certain parts of the castle are open to the public.

== Church ==
A pilgrimage church dedicate to the Assumption of Mary stands in the center of the village. It is one of the highest-quality examples of Gothic architecture in the Mura Valley.

== Coat of arms ==
The current coat of arms of the municipality of Grad was introduced in 2016. The building in the arms' center represents the castle of Grad. The crown above symbolizes the Hungarian noble Széchy family, under whose rule the town around the castle developed. The green semicircle under the castle represents the hilly landscape of the Goričko region, the cross represents the tradition of Christianity.

== Notable people ==
Notable people that were born or lived in Grad include:

- György Almásy (1867–1933), ethnographer and zoologist
- István Szelmár (1820–1877), writer
- István Zsemlics (1840–1891), writer
- Dénes Szécsi (c. 1410–1465), cardinal
