= Szécsényi family =

Hungarian noble family

House of Szécsényi
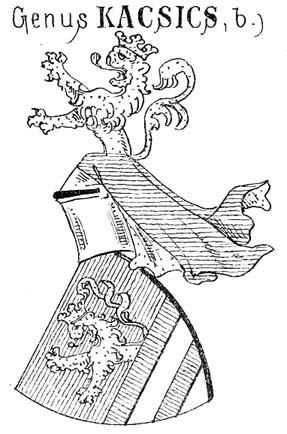
- Parent house: gens Kacsics
- Country: Hungary
- Founded: 1313
- Founder: Thomas I
- Final ruler: Ladislaus III
- Dissolution: 1460

The House of Szécsényi (Hungarian pronunciation: [ˈseːt͡ʃeːɲi]) was a noble family of the Kingdom of Hungary in the 14th–15th centuries. The ancestor of the family, Thomas descended from the gens ("clan") Kacsics. He was one of the most powerful barons of King Charles I of Hungary and he hold several dignities during his reign. The family was named after its possession, Szécsény. The male line of the family ended in 1460.

== Family tree ==
Thomas I (fl. 1299–1354†); 1∞N Visontai; 2∞Anna of Oświęcim
(1) Kónya (fl. 1327–1367†) ∞Elizabeth Haschendorfer	(1) Michael (fl. 1331–1377†)	(1) Stephen (fl. 1331)	(2) Caspar (fl. 1338–1346)	(2) Ladislaus I (fl. 1339–1340)	(2) Anne (b. 1354)
Frank (fl. 1369–1408†); 1∞Catherine Kont; 2∞Anne Liszkói	Nicholas I (fl. 1369–1383)	Simon (fl. 1373–1412†) ∞Elizabeth Garai
(1) Ladislaus II (fl. 1387–1413†) ∞Anne Szécsi	(1) Elizabeth (fl. 1405)	(2) Dorothea (fl. 1410–1434) ∞Stibor II of Stiboricz	(2) Catherine (b. 1413)	Nicholas II (fl. 1401–1438†)	Thomas II (fl. 1407)	Dorothea (fl. 1418–1419†) ∞Sigismund Losonci
Ladislaus III (fl. 1414–1460†) ∞Barbara Rozgonyi
Hedwig (fl. 1435–1460) ∞Albert Losonci	John (fl. 1437–1454†)	Catherine (fl. 1437)	Anne (fl. 1454–1484); 1∞John Ország; 2∞John Pető

== Notable members of the family ==
- Thomas Szécsényi (cca. 1285-1354), the son of Farkas Szécsényi, joined King Charles I against the powerful Máté Csák III in 1301. In 1342, he was appointed to the office of Master of the King's Treasury (tárnokmester) and in 1349, he became judge royal (országbíró).

== Sources ==
- Markó, László: A magyar állam főméltóságai Szent Istvántól napjainkig - Életrajzi Lexikon (The High Officers of the Hungarian State from Saint Stephen to the Present Days - A Biographical Encyclopedia); Magyar Könyvklub, 2000, Budapest; ISBN 963-547-085-1.
- Engel, Pál: Magyarország világi archontológiája (1301–1457) (The Temporal Archontology of Hungary (1301-1457)); História - MTA Történettudományi Intézete, 1996, Budapest; ISBN 963-8312-43-2.
