= Michael Szécsényi =

14th-century Hungarian Catholic bishop

- Bishop of Eger
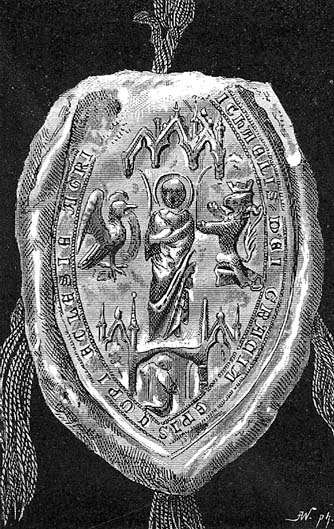
- Seal of Michael Szécsényi
- See: Eger
- Appointed: 1363
- Term ended: 1377
- Predecessor: Nicholas Dörögdi
- Successor: Emeric Cudar
- Other post: Bishop of Vác

Orders
- Ordination: 1332 by Pope John XXII
- Consecration: 8 July 1342 by Pope Clement VI

Personal details
- Born: 1317
- Died: 1377 (aged 59–60)
- Parents: Thomas Szécsényi; N Visontai

Michael Szécsényi (Hungarian: Szécsényi Mihály; 1317–1377) was a Hungarian prelate in the 14th century, who served as Bishop of Vác from 1342 to 1362, then Bishop of Eger from 1362 (or 1363) until his death.

== Life ==
Szécsényi came from the powerful and prestigious Szécsényi noble family. He was born in 1317, as the second son of Thomas Szécsényi, Voivode of Transylvania and his first wife, an unidentified daughter of landowner Paul Visontai. One of his brothers was Kónya Szécsényi, Ban of Croatia. Michael was blind in his left eye due to a childhood-related cataract throughout his life, according to a contemporary document.

As a younger son of his family, Szécsényi entered ecclesiastical career, which rapidly progressed due to his father's influence, who also became a relative to the Angevin dynasty after his second marriage to Anne, Duchess of Auschwitz. At the age of 15, Michael was made Canon of Esztergom by Pope John XXII in 1332. In the following year, he was elected Provost of Pressburg (today Bratislava, Slovakia), when he still was in "puberty age", as a document recorded. Consequently, a certain Thomas the Red served as "administrator" of the provostry beside him. Szécsényi remained in his position until 1342. He frequently resided in his manor at Visegrád, near the royal court. Subsequently, he was also elected a member of the collegiate chapter of Székesfehérvár. During his minority, Szécsényi's two tutors were John, a canon of Pressburg and Nicholas Zalai, a canon of Székesfehérvár.

Szécsényi was elected Bishop of Vác on 11 October 1341, replacing Dominican friar Rudolph, who died in office. His election was confirmed by the newly elected Pope Clement VI on 8 July 1342. The pope permitted his consecration by every bishop in his papal breve on 15 November 1343. Szécsényi held the bishopric for more than twenty years. At the end of 1362 or early 1363, he was transferred to the Diocese of Eger. He first appeared as Bishop of Eger on 19 February 1363. His election was confirmed by Pope Urban V on 28 November 1363.

In April 1363, Szécsényi acquired the village of Demjén and its mill from the Eger Chapter, in exchange for the tithe of Göncruszka. In the following years, he had several conflicts with the chapter. For instance, he unlawfully occupied the half of ecclesiastical estates in the eastern side of the Eger valley, for which the chapter protested against him on 3 March 1365. In the next year, King Louis I made it possible for the realm's nobles to designate the Diocese of Eger as heirs in their last wills. In 1367, Szécsényi handed over the Makovica Castle (today Zborov in Slovakia) to baron Peter Cudar for 200 gold ducats per year. In December 1371, Szécsényi held a three-day synod in his diocese, dedicated to its patron saint John the Apostle. Under his bishopric, the construction of the cathedral continued, as a letter from Pope Gregory XI proved it in 1372. In the same year, he acquired the village of Bátor, Heves County from the Báthory family on the occasion of a lawsuit. In 1375, Nicholas, Bishop of Milkovia styled himself as a subordinate to the Diocese of Eger. Szécsényi was last mentioned as a living person on 13 March 1377. He died before 2 October 1377.

== Sources ==
- Engel, Pál (1996). Magyarország világi archontológiája, 1301–1457, I. [Secular Archontology of Hungary, 1301–1457, Volume I] (in Hungarian). História, MTA Történettudományi Intézete. ISBN 963-8312-44-0.
- Galla, Ferenc (1970). "A váci egyházmegye püspökei [The Bishops of the Diocese of Vác]". In Bánk, József (ed.). Váci egyházmegyei almanach Szent István millénium évében (in Hungarian). Roman Catholic Diocese of Vác. pp. 103–201.
- Sugár, István (1984). Az egri püspökök története [The History of the Bishops of Eger] (in Hungarian). Szent István Társulat. ISBN 963-360-392-7.

Michael House of Szécsényi Born: 1317 Died: 1377
Catholic Church titles
Preceded by Rudolph	Bishop of Vác; 1342–1362	Succeeded by John de Surdis
Preceded by Nicholas Dörögdi	Bishop of Eger; 1363–1377	Succeeded by Emeric Cudar
