= Kónya Szécsényi =

Hungarian baron (died 1367)

Ban of Croatia and Dalmatia
- Reign: 1366–1367
- Predecessor: Nicholas Szécsi
- Successor: Emeric Lackfi
- Died: 1367
- Noble family: House of Szécsényi
- Spouse: Elizabeth Haschendorfer
- Issue: Frank; Nicholas I Simon
- Father: Thomas Szécsényi
- Mother: N Visontai

Kónya Szécsényi (or Konya; Hungarian: Szécsényi Kónya, Croatian: Konja Széchényi; died 1367), was a Hungarian baron, who served as Ban of Croatia and Dalmatia from 1366 until his death, during the reign of King Louis I of Hungary.

== Life ==
His birth name was Nicholas, but contemporaries (even in official documents) exclusively called him "Kónya" after his drooping ears (lit. "lekonyuló"). He was born into the powerful Szécsényi family as the eldest son of Thomas Szécsényi, Voivode of Transylvania and his first wife, an unidentified daughter of nobleman Paul Visontai from the gens Aba. His brothers were prelate Michael, Bishop of Vác then Eger, and Stephen, who was mentioned only once in 1331. After their mother's death, Thomas Szécsényi married to Anne, Duchess of Auschwitz. The marriage produced further three children, but all of them (Kónya's half-siblings: Caspar, Ladislaus I and Anne) died in their childhood.

Kónya first appeared in contemporary documents as a young courtier in 1327, when he already served as Master of the stewards for Queen Elizabeth, spouse of Charles I of Hungary. Despite his court function, he was not present on 17 April 1330, when Felician Záh, stormed into the dining room of the royal palace at Visegrád with a sword in his hand and attacked the royal family. However Kónya Szécsényi's familiar, deputy master John Cselenfi stabbed the assassin and the arriving royal guards killed Felician. Szécsényi functioned as Master of the stewards in the Queen's Court until 1340.

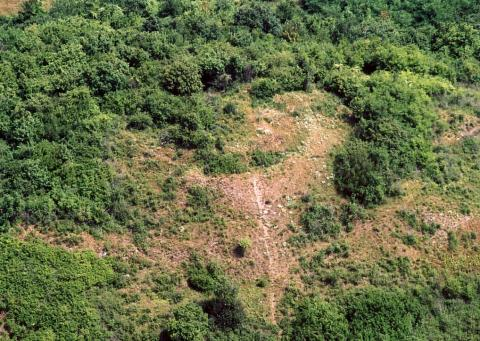
The ruins of the castle of Ecseg

He became a staunch supporter of Louis I, who ascended the throne in 1342 after his father's death. The king's mother Elizabeth "acted as a sort of co-regent" for decades, because she exerted a powerful influence on him, which also resulted her courtier Szécsényi's growing influence. He actively participated in the Neapolitan campaigns of Louis the Great, residing in Italy for years. He was involved in the siege of Corato, leading a garrison composed of Hungarian and "Lombard" soldiers. He served as ispán of Sáros and Szepes Counties from 1346 to 1349, and of Nógrád County from 1346 to 1350 (also possessing Szanda Castle as its honor). He was mentioned as castellan of Csejte Castle (today Čachtice in Slovakia) in 1354. Between 1354 and 1360, he served as ispán of Gömör County and castellan of Fülek Castle (today in Fiľakovo, Slovakia). He was made ispán of Pozsony County, holding the dignity from 1360 to 1362. He finished his career as Ban of Croatia and Dalmatia, serving in this capacity from 1366 until his death in the next year.

Kónya Szécsényi married Elizabeth Haschendorfer, a daughter of Austrian noble Wulfing I Haschendorfer from Haschendorf/Hasfalva (today part of Neckenmarkt in Austria). Margaret, the sister of his wife was the wife of Lawrence Nagymartoni. After her brother Wulfing II was killed in the Siege of Zadar (1346) and left no male heirs, King Louis granted the status of a son to Elizabeth in 1347, authorizing her to inherit her father's landed property. As a result of this, Szécsényi acquired the castle of Ecseg and other estates through his wife, which after then belonged to the Hollókő lordship (and soon it was demolished by the Szécsényis themselves). The couple had three sons: Frank, Nicholas I and Simon. Frank and Simon became notable barons during the reign of Sigismund of Luxembourg, who continued to expand family wealth and held important dignities, while Nicholas, who owned the village of Cered, was last mentioned in 1383, possibly died around that year.

== Sources ==
- Bertényi, Iván (1989). Nagy Lajos király [King Louis the Great]. Kossuth Könyvkiadó. ISBN 963-09-3388-8.
- Engel, Pál (1996). Magyarország világi archontológiája, 1301–1457, I. [Secular Archontology of Hungary, 1301–1457, Volume I] (in Hungarian). História, MTA Történettudományi Intézete. ISBN 963-8312-44-0.
- Markó, László (2006). A magyar állam főméltóságai Szent Istvántól napjainkig: Életrajzi Lexikon [Great Officers of State in Hungary from King Saint Stephen to Our Days: A Biographical Encyclopedia] (in Hungarian). Helikon Kiadó. ISBN 963-208-970-7.

Kónya House of Szécsényi Born: ? Died: 1367
Political offices
Preceded by Nicholas Szécsi	Ban of Croatia and Dalmatia; 1366–1367	Succeeded by Emeric Lackfi
