= Simon Rozgonyi =

Hungarian nobleman (died 1414)

Simon Rozgonyi (died March 1414) was a Hungarian nobleman and judge royal, who supported Ladislaus of Naples against Sigismund, Holy Roman Emperor. He had two wives, Anna and Margit, and five children. His son Simon was bishop of Eger (1440–1444) and was killed in the Battle of Varna.

== Sources ==
Political offices
| Preceded by Frank Szécsényi | Judge royal 1409–1414 | Succeeded by Peter Perényi |
