= John de Surdis =

Hungarian prelate

- Archbishop of Esztergom
- Installed: 1376
- Term ended: 1378
- Predecessor: Thomas Telegdi
- Successor: Demetrius
- Other posts: Bishop of Vác; Bishop of Győr

Personal details
- Born: Piacenza
- Died: April/June 1378
- Denomination: Roman Catholic
- Parents: Domenico de Surdis

John de Surdis (Hungarian: De Surdis János, Italian: Giovanni de Surdis; died 1378) was an Italian-born Hungarian prelate in the 14th century. He served as Bishop of Vác from 1363 to 1375, Bishop of Győr from 1375 to 1376, then Archbishop of Esztergom from 1376 until his death. After acquiring the castle of Lipovec, his family elevated into the Hungarian nobility, and he was also known as John of Lipovec (Hungarian: Lipoveci János) thereafter.

== Early life and career ==
He was born in Piacenza into an Italian noble family, as one of the four sons of Domenico de Surdis. His origin was proved by a papal register in 1349. According to a family tradition, their ancestor Galvano came to Italy from England in the 11th century, and settled down in Sordio (Latin: Surdis). A water snake was depicted in his coat-of-arms. John had three brothers (Lucas, Raphael and Michael) and an unidentified sister, who married Francesco de Surdis. With the arrival of the brothers to Hungary, their family belonged to the nobility, later was also known as Lipoveci. The family became extinct by the first half of the 15th century.

John de Surdis was a canon of the Saint Antoninus church in Piacenza. It is presumable that he came to the Kingdom of Hungary upon the invitation of his former schoolmate James of Piacenza, a court physician of Charles I of Hungary, who eventually became Bishop of Csanád, then Bishop of Zagreb in 1345. In the same year, de Surdis was first referred to as cantor of the Chapter of Čazma (Csázma), which belonged to the Diocese of Zagreb. Succeeding the late Demetrius Vicsadoli, De Surdis was appointed provost of Kalocsa by the newly-elected archbishop Denis Lackfi in 1351, who also sent him to Avignon to the court of Pope Clement VI for his pallium. De Surdis resided in the papal court for a year, because the pope conducted a lengthy investigation in connection with the regular election of Lackfi before its confirmation. Louis I of Hungary sent his envoy John de Surdis to Bernabò Visconti, Lord of Milan in 1360 to persuade him to abandon the siege of Bologna. De Surdis has not achieved success; upon the request of Pope Innocent VI, Louis sent Hungarian troops to relieve the papal city. During his legation, de Surdis was created papal chaplain. He was elected provost of Eger on 4 February 1361. He was again sent to the Holy See in the next year.

== Prelate ==
At the end of 1362 or early 1363, Bishop Michael Szécsényi was transferred from the Diocese of Vác to Eger. During that time, John de Surdis was elected as his successor. His election was confirmed by Pope Urban V on 23 January 1363. He spent the following years in abroad, representing his sovereign in the Italian Peninsula. After a visit to the Avignon in order to pay tax on appointments in 1364, Pope Urban commissioned him to restore and promote peace between his monarch Louis I and his ally Rudolf IV, Duke of Austria, and Charles IV, Holy Roman Emperor and John Henry, Margrave of Moravia. When John de Surdis again visited Avignon still in that year, he assured the pope that Louis I, as only monarch, will provide Hungarian troops to a military campaign against the Ottoman Empire, when Peter I of Cyprus attempted to persuade a dozen European monarchs to join Urban's planned crusade. Later, however, the Hungarian king failed to fulfill his promise. While visiting the papal court at Avignon, de Surdis also submitted the church affairs of the Diocese of Vác; for instance, he wanted to procure the church tax liability of those pagan Cumans, who lived in the territory of his bishopric, but the pope did not support him in this effort because of Louis' opposition for pragmatic and military reasons. De Surdis requested permission to pilgrimage to the Holy Land, but is presumable, that he never realized his intent. In the following years, he again served as envoy of the Hungarian monarch. Alongside Judge royal Nicholas Szécsi and Cato, provost of Dömös; he sought the support of Pope Urban in the question of legitimacy of Louis I to claim the Polish throne in 1369. During that visit, John de Surdis and his companions viewed the Veil of Veronica.

John de Surdis was a strong confidant of Louis I as an influential member of the royal council. When the king's distant cousin Charles of Durazzo was created Duke of Slavonia in 1371, de Surdis acted as governor of the province on his behalf. Concurrently, when Charles became Duke of Croatia too in the next year, de Surdis was styled as governor of Dalmatia. He held both dignities until the end of 1372. He was made royal treasurer in the next year, first mentioned in this capacity by two contemporary documents on 1 May and 2 August. He functioned in this capacity until 1375, while he was also styled as comes of Zara (present-day Zadar in Croatia). He was the first office-holder, whose position was included in the dignity lists of the royal charters. For his loyal service, John and his family (his surviving brothers, Raphael and Michael, and a nephew John) were granted the fort of Lipovec by Louis I in 1373. Thereafter they were referred with the surname of Lipoveci (lit. "of Lipovec").

Following the death of Coloman (otherwise the late King Charles' illegitimate son), John de Surdis was elected Bishop of Győr sometime around May 1375. However, soon, he was translated to the Archdiocese of Esztergom by Pope Gregory XI on 23 January 1376, following the death of Thomas Telegdi. During that time, he resided in the papal court, initially in order to confirm his election of Bishop of Győr. the contemporary royal documents considered the bishopric of Győr as vacant. John de Surdis died around May or June 1378.

== Sources ==
- Beke, Margit (2003). "De Surdis II. János [John II De Surdis]". In Beke, Margit (ed.). Esztergomi érsekek 1001–2003 [Archbishops of Esztergom 1001–2003] (in Hungarian). Szent István Társulat. pp. 185–188. ISBN 963-361-472-4.
- Engel, Pál (1996). Magyarország világi archontológiája, 1301–1457, I. [Secular Archontology of Hungary, 1301–1457, Volume I] (in Hungarian). História, MTA Történettudományi Intézete. ISBN 963-8312-44-0.
- Galla, Ferenc (1970). "A váci egyházmegye püspökei [The Bishops of the Diocese of Vác]". In Bánk, József (ed.). Váci egyházmegyei almanach Szent István millénium évében (in Hungarian). Roman Catholic Diocese of Vác. pp. 103–201.
- Markó, László (2006). A magyar állam főméltóságai Szent Istvántól napjainkig: Életrajzi Lexikon [Great Officers of State in Hungary from King Saint Stephen to Our Days: A Biographical Encyclopedia] (in Hungarian). Helikon Kiadó. ISBN 963-208-970-7.
- Soós, Ferenc (1999). Magyarország kincstartói, 1340–1540 [The royal purse-bearers of Hungary, 1340–1540] (in Hungarian). Argumentum. ISBN 963-446-118-2.
- Weisz, Boglárka (2015). "Ki volt az első kincstartó? A kincstartói hivatal története a 14. században [Who Was the First Treasurer? The History of the Treasurer's Office in the 14th-Century]". Történelmi Szemle (in Hungarian). 57 (4). Hungarian Academy of Sciences: 527–540. ISSN 0040-9634.

John I House of Surdis (Lipoveci) Born: ? Died: 1378
Catholic Church titles
Preceded by Michael Szécsényi	Bishop of Vác; 1363–1375	Succeeded by Peter
Preceded by Coloman	Bishop of Győr; 1375–1376	Succeeded by Peter Siklósi
Preceded by Thomas Telegdi	Archbishop of Esztergom; 1376–1378	Succeeded by Demetrius
Political offices
Preceded by Demetrius	Royal treasurer 1373–1375	Succeeded by Nicholas Zámbó
