= István Zsemlics =

István Zsemlics or Zsemlits (Slovene: 'Števan Žemlič' or Žemlitš; around July 9, 1840 – November 10, 1891) was a Slovene author and Catholic priest.

He was born in Murska Sobota in the region Prekmurje, in what was the Vas county of the Kingdom of Hungary in the Austrian Empire. His parents were József Zsemlits, shoemaker and Anna Karlovics. Between 1864 and 1868 he served as chaplain in Beltinci (Hungarian: Belatinc), and later as parish priest in Alsószölnök (Slovene: Dolnji Senik) and in Gornja Lendava (in Hungarian Felsőlendva, now Grad, Slovenia) from 1887 to his death in 1891.

In 1871, he wrote the book Návuk od szvétogá potrdjenyá szvesztva, which was published in Graz, Duchy of Styria.

== See also ==
- List of Slovene writers and poets in Hungary

== Sources ==
- Anton Trstenjak: Slovenci na Ogrskem (Slovenes in Hungary), Maribor 2006. ISBN 961-6507-09-5
