= Demetrius of Esztergom =

Hungarian cardinal and politician

His Eminence Demetrius
- Cardinal Archbishop of Esztergom
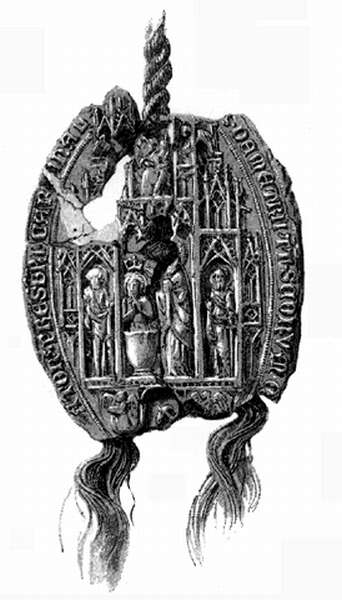
- Seal of Archbishop Demetrius
- Archdiocese: Archdiocese of Esztergom
- Appointed: 16 August 1378
- Term ended: 23 January 1387
- Predecessor: John de Surdis
- Successor: John Kanizsai
- Other posts: Bishop of Zagreb; Bishop of Transylvania; Bishop of Syrmia

Orders
- Created cardinal: 18 October 1378 by Pope Urban VI

Personal details
- Died: 20 February 1387
- Denomination: Roman Catholicism

Demetrius (Hungarian: Demeter; died 20 February 1387), was a Hungarian cardinal and politician, who served as archbishop of Esztergom and bishop of Zagreb and Transylvania, and chancellor.

== Origins and early career ==
Nothing is known about the origin of Demetrius, who would rise to the highest ecclesiastical titles, but it is presumed that he came from a family of peasants. His father was a certain Peter. Other historians claimed he belonged to the Kaplon of Kaplai kindreds, or was a member of the Bajoni noble family. Towards the end of his life, he appeared in contemporary sources as Demetrius of Vaskút (Hungarian: Vaskúti Demeter), after receiving land donations in Nógrád and Gömör Counties in 1381.

Along with his brother Philip, he was raised together with King Charles I's eldest son, Louis, who would become King Louis I in 1342. In 1356, he became Keeper of the Seals thus permanently belonged to the escort of Louis I. Three years later, he was put in charge of the royal treasury. In this capacity, he oversaw the treasury's goods and gifts (munera), and also retained and stored the royal charters on estate donations. According to historian Pál Engel, the office of treasurer was emerged into permanent status by 1377, possibly on the initiative of Demetrius himself. At this time, he began his ecclesiastical career, becoming canon of Pécs in 1363 and provost of Eger. In July 1364, Pope Urban V appointed him bishop of Syrmia but Demetrius did not assume the office until 1 April 1365. On 28 June 1368, Demetrius was also made bishop of Transylvania. During his tenure as bishop of Transylvania, Demetrius had a cloister built for the Order of Saint Paul the First Hermit. From May to July 1375, he was also mentioned as secret chancellor in the royal court. In the same year, he participated in negotiations over the future marriage of Sigismund of Luxemburg and Princess Mary.

== As chancellor and cardinal ==
Demetrius, recently created Chancellor of the Kingdom (a post he would hold until his death), had to leave the court having been given the bishopric of Zagreb by Pope Gregory XI on 23 January 1376. On 16 August 1378, Pope Urban VI appointed him archbishop of Esztergom and made him a cardinal and titular cardinal-priest of Santi Quattro Coronati on 18 October. Demetrius never visited Rome as a cardinal and became papal ambassador in Hungary. As (lord) chancellor, Demetrius was also head of the newly emerged court of special presence (a predecessor institution of the chief justice), however the judicial function was performed by his deputies (the most notable one was John of Küküllő). As archbishop of Esztergom, Demetrius officiated at the funeral of King Louis I on 16 September 1382 and crowned Mary, Louis I's elder daughter and successor on the Hungarian throne, the following day in Székesfehérvár Basilica. In 1384, Cardinal Demetrius travelled to Poland with significant armed escort, accompanying Louis I's younger daughter, Saint Hedwig, who had been elected to succeed her father on the throne of Poland.

In August 1385, the Archbishop performed the marriage ceremony between Queen Mary and Sigismund of Luxembourg, thus infuriating the Queen's mother and regent, Elizabeth of Bosnia. The queen dowager wanted to retaliate to the marriage by trying to deprive the archbishop of his see. Sigismund soon left the kingdom, enabling the Hungarian nobility to invite King Charles III of Naples, the heir male of Louis I, to claim the throne. Charles successfully invaded Hungary and dethroned Mary. On 31 December 1385, Demetrius crowned him king of Hungary in the presence of the former queen, Mary, and the queen dowager, Elizabeth. However, Queen Elizabeth had King Charles II stabbed to death in her apartments in February 1386. Sigismund returned to Hungary shortly after to be crowned king as Mary's co-ruler, but Demetrius died before the coronation took place.

== Sources ==
- Bertényi, Iván (2003). "Demeter [Demetrius]". In Beke, Margit (ed.). Esztergomi érsekek 1001–2003 [Archbishops of Esztergom 1001–2003] (in Hungarian). Szent István Társulat. pp. 188–196. ISBN 963-361-472-4.
- Csukovits, Enikő (2019). Az Anjouk Magyarországon. II. rész. I. (Nagy) Lajos és Mária uralma (1342‒1395) [The Angevins in Hungary, Vol. 2. The Reigns of Louis I the Great and Mary (1342‒1395)] (in Hungarian). MTA Bölcsészettudományi Kutatóközpont Történettudományi Intézet. ISBN 978-963-9627-54-3.
- Dobronić, Lelja (1995). "Demetrij I. [Demetrius I]". In Franko, Mirošević (ed.). Zagrebački biskupi i nadbiskupi [Bishops and Archbishops of Zagreb] (in Croatian). Školska knjiga. pp. 137–139. ISBN 953-0-60597-8.
- Engel, Pál (1996). Magyarország világi archontológiája, 1301–1457, I. [Secular Archontology of Hungary, 1301–1457, Volume I] (in Hungarian). História, MTA Történettudományi Intézete. ISBN 963-8312-44-0.
- Gerics, József (1966). "A magyar királyi kúriai bíráskodás és központi igazgatás Anjou-kori történetéhez [To the History of the Hungarian Royal Court Judgment and Central Administration in the Angevin Period]". Jogtörténeti tanulmányok (in Hungarian). 1 (1). Közgazdasági és Jogi Könyvkiadó: 285–306. ISSN 0139-2042.
- Gillespie, James; Goodman, Anthony, eds. (1998). Richard II: The Art of Kingship. Oxford: Clarendon Press. ISBN 0-19-820189-3.
- Mályusz, Elemér (1984). Zsigmond király uralma Magyarországon, 1387–1437 [The Rule of King Sigismund in Hungary, 1387–1437] (in Hungarian). Gondolat. ISBN 963-281-414-2.
- Markó, László (2006). A magyar állam főméltóságai Szent Istvántól napjainkig: Életrajzi Lexikon [Great Officers of State in Hungary from King Saint Stephen to Our Days: A Biographical Encyclopedia] (in Hungarian). Helikon Kiadó. ISBN 963-208-970-7.
- Rácz, György (2020). "Az egyházi elit változásai [Changes in the Church Elite]". In Csukovits, Enikő (ed.). Az Anjou-kor hatalmi elitje (in Hungarian). MTA Bölcsészettudományi Kutatóközpont. pp. 133–162. ISBN 978-963-416-212-4.
- Soós, Ferenc (1999). Magyarország kincstartói, 1340–1540 [The royal purse-bearers of Hungary, 1340–1540] (in Hungarian). Argumentum. ISBN 963-446-118-2.
- Süttő, Szilárd (2003). Anjou-Magyarország alkonya I–II. [The Twilight of Angevin Hungary] (in Hungarian). Belvedere Meridionale. ISBN 963-86387-0-2.
- Temesváry, János (1922). Erdély középkori püspökei [Medieval Bishops of Transylvania] (in Hungarian). Minerva Irodalmi és Nyomdai Műintézet.
- Weisz, Boglárka (2015). "Ki volt az első kincstartó? A kincstartói hivatal története a 14. században [Who Was the First Treasurer? The History of the Treasurer's Office in the 14th-Century]". Történelmi Szemle (in Hungarian). 57 (4). Hungarian Academy of Sciences: 527–540. ISSN 0040-9634.
- Wertner, Mór (1904). "Adalékok Demeter bíboros esztergomi érsek életrajzához [Additions to the Life of Cardinal Demeter, Archbishop of Esztergom]". Századok (in Hungarian). 38 (4). Magyar Történelmi Társulat: 800–802. ISSN 0039-8098.

Demetrius Died: 20 February 1387
Political offices
| Preceded by Demetrius Marjádi (?) | Royal treasurer 1359–1370 | Succeeded by John de Surdis |
| New title | Lord Chancellor; 1376–1387 | Succeeded by John Kanizsai |
Religious titles
| Preceded by Thomas | Bishop of Syrmia; 1364–1368 | Succeeded by Stephen Paksi |
| Preceded by Dominic Szécsi | Bishop of Transylvania; 1368–1376 | Succeeded by Goblinus |
| Preceded by Stephen Kanizsai | Bishop of Zagreb; 1376–1378 | Succeeded by Paul Horvat |
| Preceded by John de Surdis | Archbishop of Esztergom; 1378–1387 | Succeeded by John Kanizsai |
