= Nicholas II Szécsi =

Hungarian nobleman

Nicholas (II) Szécsi

Master of the treasury
- Reign: December 1408 – February 1410
- Died: after 1429
- Noble family: House of Szécsi
- Spouse: Helen Garay
- Issue: Dénes
- Father: Nicholas Szécsi
- Mother: Margit Debreceni

Nicholas Szécsi de Felsőlendva (Széchy; Hungarian: Miklós Szécsi; died after 1423) was a Hungarian nobleman from the influential House of Szécsi.

He was the son of Nicholas I Szécsi, the Palatine of Hungary (1385–1386) and Margit Debreceni, granddaughter of former palatine Dózsa Debreceni. He had three brothers, including Frank, who served as Royal treasurer between 1394 and 1396. Nicholas II married Helen Garay, daughter of Nicholas I Garay, they had eight children, including Cardinal Dénes Szécsi, Archbishop of Esztergom.

Nicholas served as Royal treasurer from May to December 1397. He was the ispán of Zala County in 1402. He functioned as secular gubernator of the Roman Catholic Diocese of Veszprém between 1403 and 1405. He was the master of the doorkeepers for the Queen from 1406 to 1409. He was appointed Master of the treasury in December 1408. He held that office until February 1410. he functioned as ispán of Vas County (1406–1419), Sopron County (1406–1410). He participated in the League of Siklós. He was a founding member of the Order of the Dragon since 1408.

== Sources ==
- (in Hungarian) Engel, Pál (1996). Magyarország világi archontológiája, 1301–1457, I. ("Secular Archontology of Hungary, 1301–1457, Volume I"). História, MTA Történettudományi Intézete. Budapest. ISBN 963-8312-44-0.
- (in Hungarian) Markó, László: A magyar állam főméltóságai Szent Istvántól napjainkig – Életrajzi Lexikon p. 365. (The High Officers of the Hungarian State from Saint Stephen to the Present Days – A Biographical Encyclopedia) (2nd edition); Helikon Kiadó Kft., 2006, Budapest; ISBN 963-547-085-1.
- (in Hungarian) Soós, Ferenc (1999). Magyarország kincstartói, 1340–1540 ("Royal treasurers of Hungary, 1340–1540"). Budapest.

Nicholas II House of Szécsi Died: after 1429
Political offices
Preceded by Nicholas Treutel	Master of the treasury 1408 –1410	Succeeded by John Bebek
