= Rimavské Brezovo =

- Municipality
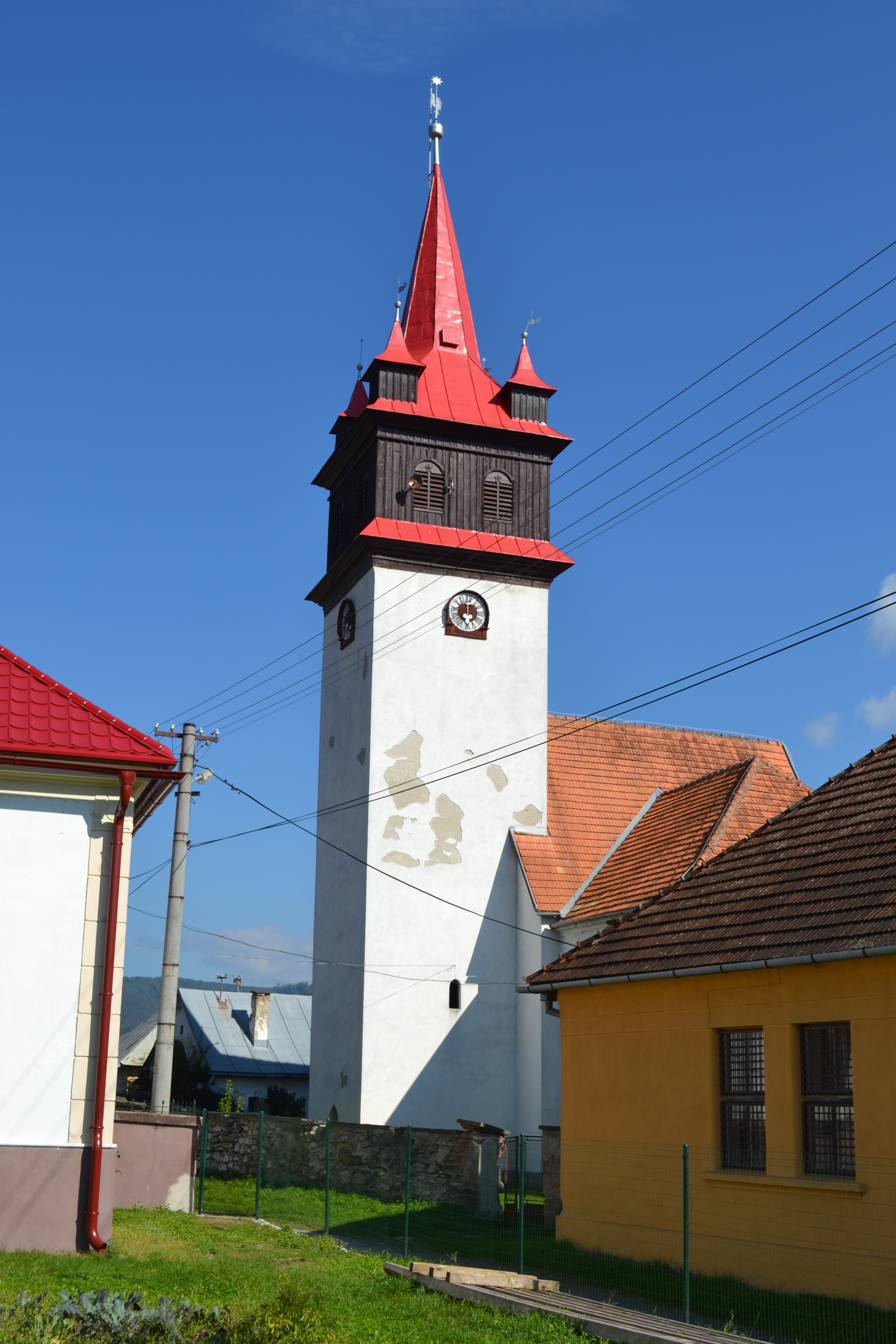

- Flag

- Location of Rimavské Brezovo in the Banská Bystrica Region Location of Rimavské Brezovo in Slovakia
- Coordinates: 48°32′23″N 19°57′33″E
- Country: Slovakia
- Region: Banská Bystrica Region
- District: Rimavská Sobota District
- First mentioned: 1334

Area
  - Total: 14.09 km^{2} (5.44 sq mi)
- Elevation: 269 m (883 ft)

Population (2025)
  - Total: 506
- Time zone: UTC+1 (CET)
  - Summer (DST): UTC+2 (CEST)
- Postal code: 980 54
- Area code: +421 47
- Vehicle registration plate (until 2022): RS

Rimavské Brezovo is a village and municipality in the Rimavská Sobota District of the Banská Bystrica Region of southern Slovakia. The evangelical church from 13th century and an old mining company building are important historical heritage of this village. Inside the evangelical church are gothic wall paintings from 18th century.

== Geography ==
The municipality lies at an altitude of 269 metres (883 ft) and covers an area of 14.09 km^{2} (5.44 sq mi) (2025).

== Population ==
Population statistic (10 years)
Year	1995	2005	2015	2025
Count	506	521	521	506
Difference		+2.96%	+0%	−2.87%

Population statistic
Year	2024	2025
Count	495	506
Difference		+2.22%

It has a population of 506 people (31 December 2025).

=== Ethnicity ===
Census 2021 (1+ %)
Ethnicity	Number	Fraction
Slovak	499	99%
Romani	19	3.76%
Total	504	

In year 2021 was 504 people by ethnicity 499 as Slovak, 19 as Romani, 5 as Not found out, 3 as Czech, 2 as Hungarian, 2 as French, 1 as Irish, 1 as Serbian, 1 as Russian and 1 as Other.

Note on population: The difference values of population numbers in the table "Population statistic" and in the sections "Ethnicity" & "Religion" is caused by the use of various statistical methods.

=== Religion ===
Census 2021 (1+ %)
Religion	Number	Fraction
None	237	47.02%
Roman Catholic Church	185	36.71%
Evangelical Church	66	13.1%
Total	504	

In year 2021 was 504 people by religion 237 from None, 185 from Roman Catholic Church, 66 from Evangelical Church, 5 from Not found out, 4 from Greek Catholic Church, 3 from Ad hoc movements, 2 from Other and not ascertained christian church, 1 from Christian Congregations in Slovakia and 1 from United Methodist Church.
