= Kraskovo, Slovakia =

Kraskovo Karaszkó
- Municipality
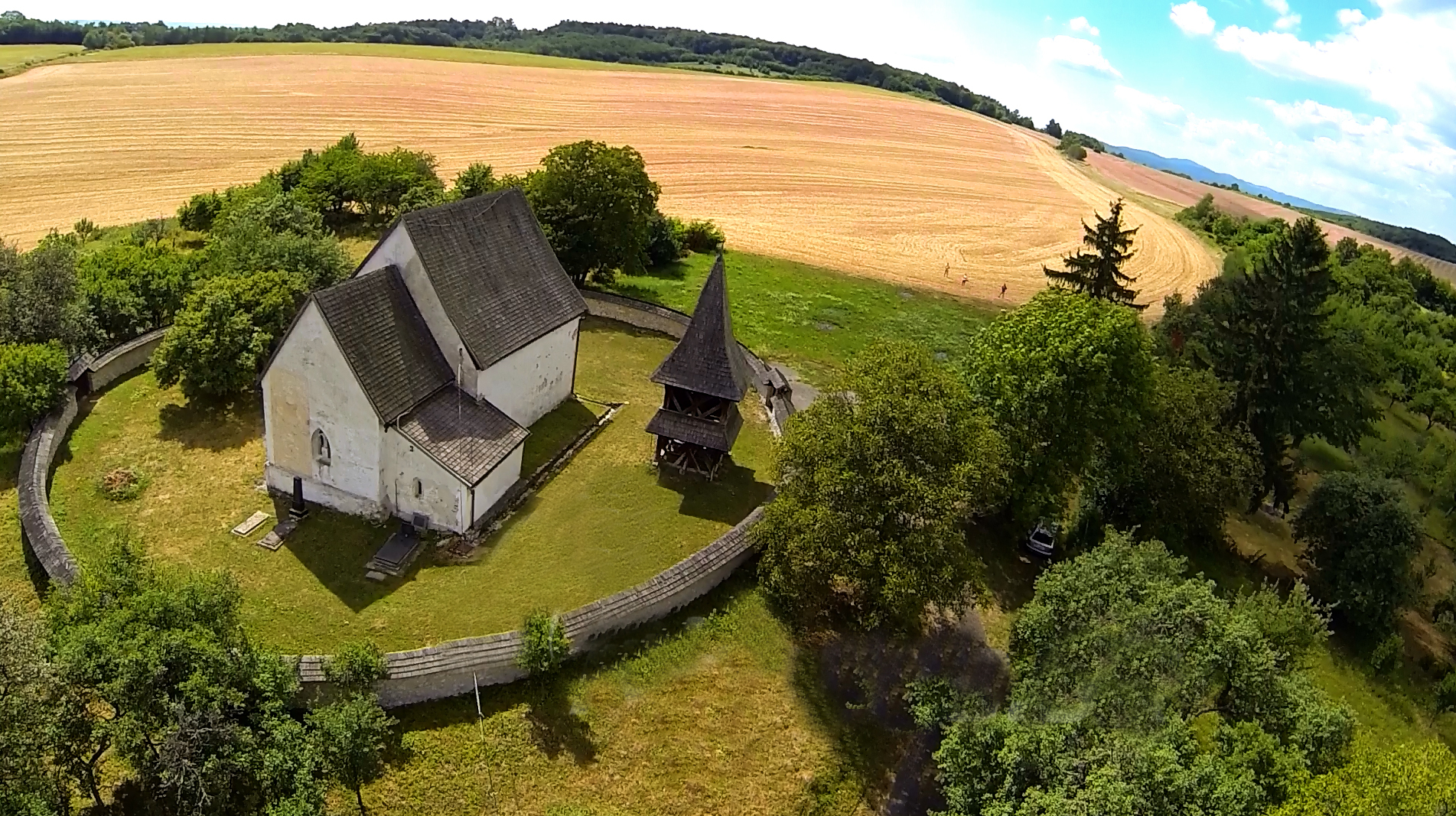
- Evangelic Church

- Flag

- Location of Kraskovo in the Banská Bystrica Region Location of Kraskovo in Slovakia
- Coordinates: 48°30′N 19°59′E
- Country: Slovakia
- Region: Banská Bystrica Region
- District: Rimavská Sobota District
- First mentioned: 1334

Area
  - Total: 7.16 km^{2} (2.76 sq mi)
- Elevation: 416 m (1,365 ft)

Population (2025)
  - Total: 108
- Time zone: UTC+1 (CET)
  - Summer (DST): UTC+2 (CEST)
- Postal code: 980 26
- Area code: +421 47
- Vehicle registration plate (until 2022): RS
- Website: www.kraskovo.eu

Kraskovo (Hungarian: Karaszkó) is a village and municipality in the Rimavská Sobota District of the Banská Bystrica Region of southern Slovakia. Notable attractions include a late gothic evangelical church containing renaissance paintings and featuring a wooden belfry constructed in 1657. In the village is a memorial to 19th century Slovak writer August Horislav Škultéty.

== Geography ==
The municipality lies at an altitude of 416 metres (1,365 ft) and covers an area of 7.16 km^{2} (2.76 sq mi) (2025).

== Population ==
Population statistic (10 years)
Year	1995	2005	2015	2025
Count	187	140	138	108
Difference		−25.13%	−1.42%	−21.73%

Population statistic
Year	2024	2025
Count	112	108
Difference		−3.57%

It has a population of 108 people (31 December 2025).

=== Ethnicity ===
Census 2021 (1+ %)
Ethnicity	Number	Fraction
Slovak	129	96.99%
Hungarian	4	3%
Not found out	2	1.5%
Total	133	

In year 2021 was 133 people by ethnicity 129 as Slovak, 4 as Hungarian, 2 as Not found out and 1 as Czech.

Note on population: The difference values of population numbers in the table "Population statistic" and in the sections "Ethnicity" & "Religion" is caused by the use of various statistical methods.

=== Religion ===
Census 2021 (1+ %)
Religion	Number	Fraction
None	54	40.6%
Roman Catholic Church	51	38.35%
Evangelical Church	24	18.05%
Total	133	

In year 2021 was 133 people by religion 54 from None, 51 from Roman Catholic Church, 24 from Evangelical Church, 1 from Not found out, 1 from Christian Congregations in Slovakia, 1 from Greek Catholic Church and 1 from United Methodist Church.
