= Rimavská Baňa =

Rimavská Baňa Rimabánya
- Municipality
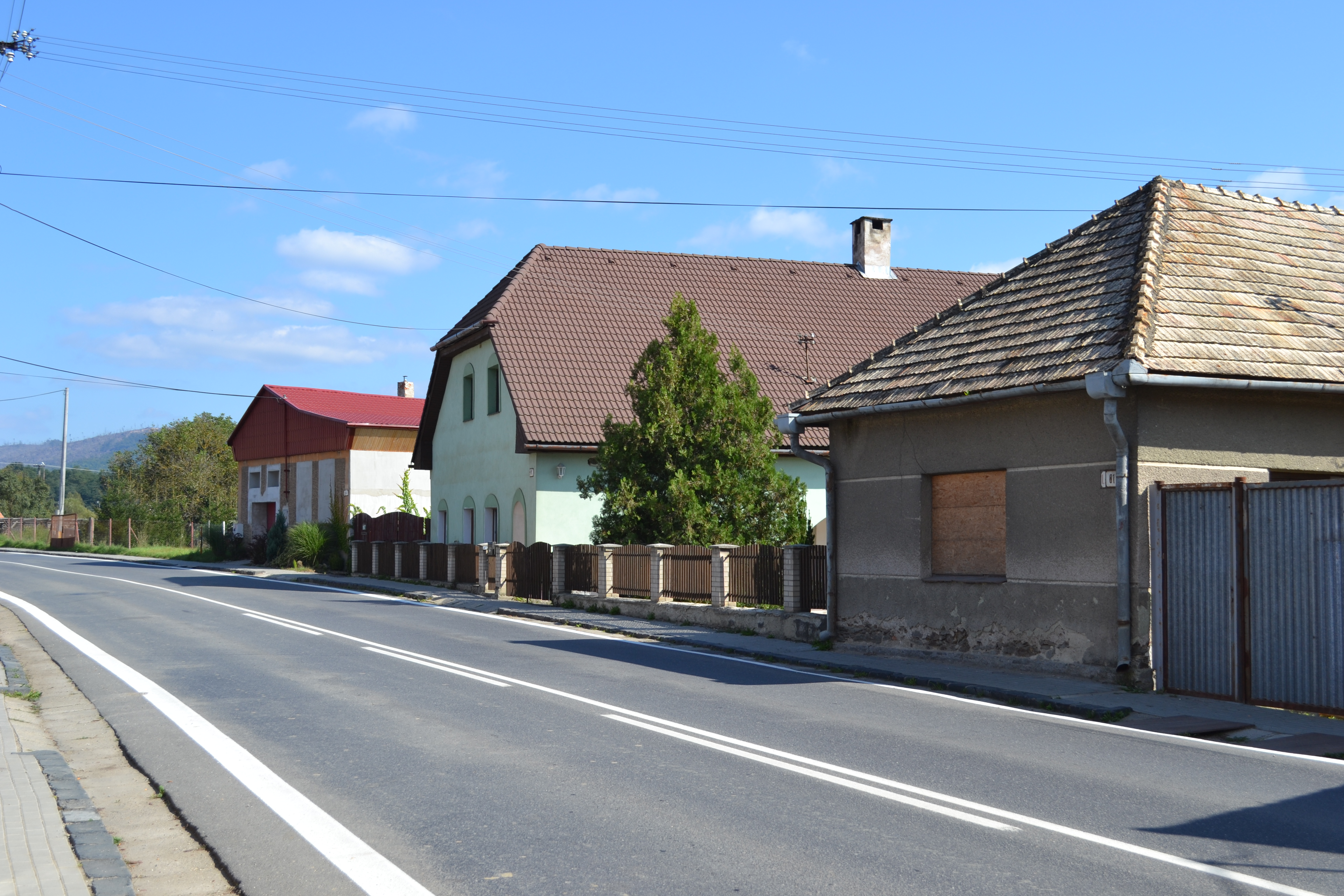

- Location of Rimavská Baňa in the Banská Bystrica Region Location of Rimavská Baňa in Slovakia
- Coordinates: 48.50°N 19.93°E
- Country: Slovakia
- Region: Banská Bystrica Region
- District: Rimavská Sobota District
- First mentioned: 1270

Area
  - Total: 28.04 km^{2} (10.83 sq mi)
- Elevation: 256 m (840 ft)

Population (2025)
  - Total: 483
- Time zone: UTC+1 (CET)
  - Summer (DST): UTC+2 (CEST)
- Postal code: 980 53
- Area code: +421 47
- Vehicle registration plate (until 2022): RS
- Website: obecrimavskabana.sk

Rimavská Baňa (Hungarian: Rimabánya) is a village and municipality in the Rimavská Sobota District of the Banská Bystrica Region of southern Slovakia. The name of the village means Mine of the Rimava region and is a commemoration of the mining history of the region. Although mining is for some centuries not present, the village is a home to one of the nicest decorated church in the region. Protestant church from the 13th century was several times rebuilt, in its present form it has baroque features. It contains Gothic wall paintings, painted wooden matroneum from 1726 and painted wooden ceiling.

== Geography ==
The municipality lies at an altitude of 256 metres (840 ft) and covers an area of 28.04 km^{2} (10.83 sq mi) (2025).

== Population ==
Population statistic (10 years)
Year	1995	2005	2015	2025
Count	410	463	535	483
Difference		+12.92%	+15.55%	−9.71%

Population statistic
Year	2024	2025
Count	502	483
Difference		−3.78%

It has a population of 483 people (31 December 2025).

=== Ethnicity ===
Census 2021 (1+ %)
Ethnicity	Number	Fraction
Slovak	509	96.4%
Romani	69	13.06%
Not found out	16	3.03%
Total	528	

In year 2021 was 528 people by ethnicity 509 as Slovak, 69 as Romani, 16 as Not found out, 1 as Czech, 1 as Italian, 1 as Rusyn and 1 as Russian.

Note on population: The difference values of population numbers in the table "Population statistic" and in the sections "Ethnicity" & "Religion" is caused by the use of various statistical methods.

=== Religion ===
Census 2021 (1+ %)
Religion	Number	Fraction
None	227	42.99%
Roman Catholic Church	208	39.39%
Evangelical Church	63	11.93%
Not found out	16	3.03%
Greek Catholic Church	10	1.89%
Total	528	

In year 2021 was 528 people by religion 227 from None, 208 from Roman Catholic Church, 63 from Evangelical Church, 16 from Not found out, 10 from Greek Catholic Church, 2 from Ad hoc movements, 1 from Old Catholic Church and 1 from Jehovah's Witnesses.
