= Kyjatice =

Kyjatice Kiéte
- Municipality
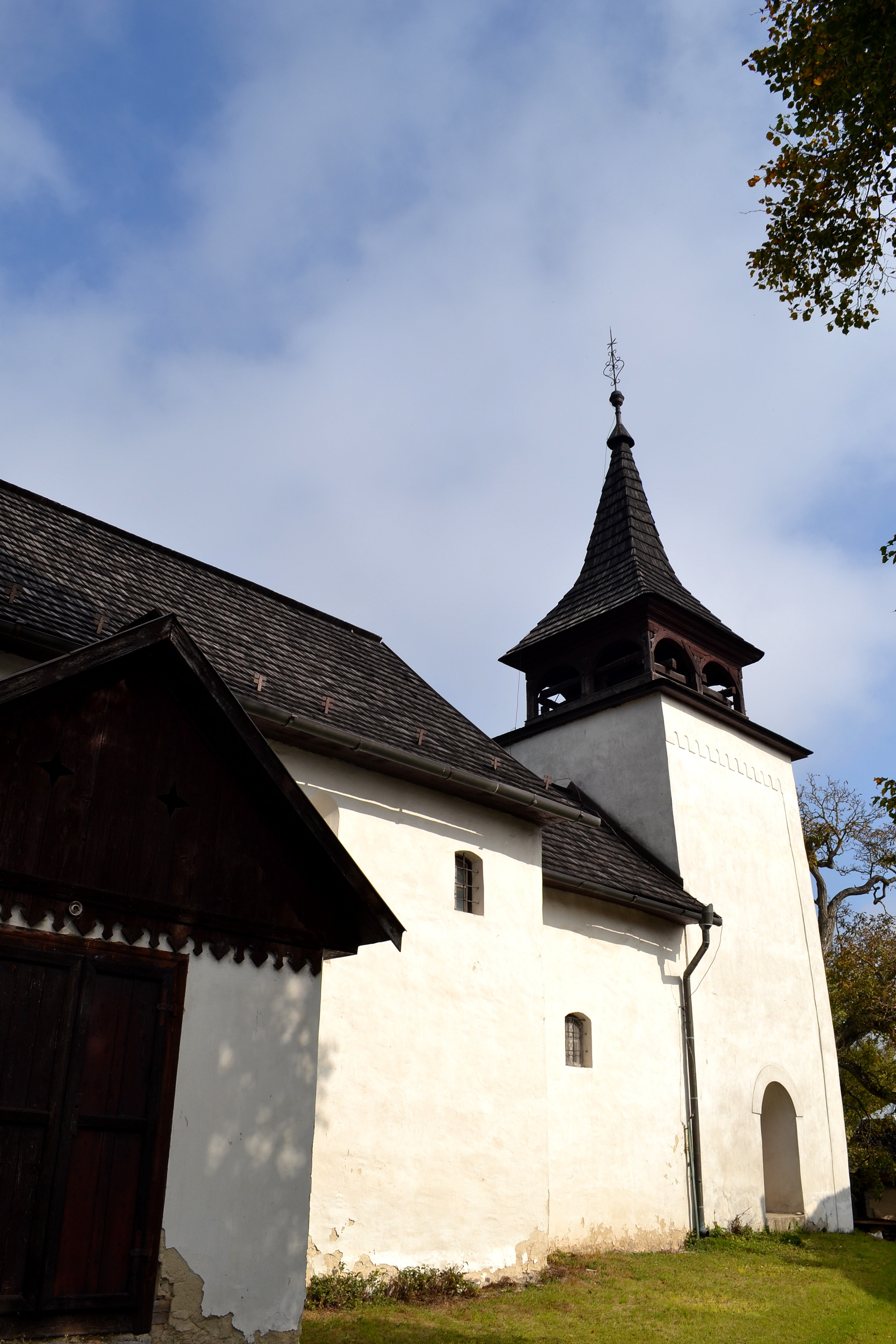

- Flag

- Location of Kyjatice in the Banská Bystrica Region Location of Kyjatice in Slovakia
- Coordinates: 48.52°N 20.00°E
- Country: Slovakia
- Region: Banská Bystrica Region
- District: Rimavská Sobota District
- First mentioned: 1413

Area
  - Total: 6.15 km^{2} (2.37 sq mi)
- Elevation: 465 m (1,526 ft)

Population (2025)
  - Total: 63
- Time zone: UTC+1 (CET)
  - Summer (DST): UTC+2 (CEST)
- Postal code: 980 54
- Area code: +421 47
- Vehicle registration plate (until 2022): RS

Kyjatice (Hungarian: Kiéte) is a village and municipality in the Rimavská Sobota District of the Banská Bystrica Region of southern Slovakia. Near the village there is archaeological park with more than 2000 years old excavations. Protestant church in the village contains Gothic paint wall from 14th century, painted wooden Renaissance ceiling from 1637 and Renaissance altar from 1678.

== Geography ==
The municipality lies at an altitude of 465 metres (1,526 ft) and covers an area of 6.15 km^{2} (2.37 sq mi) (2025).

== Population ==
Population statistic (10 years)
Year	1995	2005	2015	2025
Count	97	76	78	63
Difference		−21.64%	+2.63%	−19.23%

Population statistic
Year	2024	2025
Count	71	63
Difference		−11.26%

It has a population of 63 people (31 December 2025).

=== Ethnicity ===
Census 2021 (1+%)
Ethnicity	Number	Fraction
Slovak	64	98.46%
Romani	4	6.15%
Not found out	2	3.07%
Total	65	

In year 2021 was 65 people by ethnicity 64 as Slovak, 4 as Romani and 2 as Not found out.

Note on population: The difference values of population numbers in the table "Population statistic" and in the sections "Ethnicity" & "Religion" is caused by the use of various statistical methods.

=== Religion ===
Census 2021 (1+%)
Religion	Number	Fraction
None	24	36.92%
Evangelical Church	19	29.23%
Roman Catholic Church	16	24.62%
Not found out	5	7.69%
Greek Catholic Church	1	1.54%
Total	65	

In year 2021 was 65 people by religion 24 from None, 19 from Evangelical Church, 16 from Roman Catholic Church, 5 from Not found out and 1 from Greek Catholic Church.
