= Frank Szécsi =

Hungarian nobleman

- Died: 28 September 1396; Nicopolis
- Noble family: House of Szécsi
- Father: Nicholas Szécsi
- Mother: Margit Debreceni

Frank Szécsi de Felsőlendva (Széchy; died 28 September 1396) was a Hungarian nobleman from the influential House of Szécsi. He was the son of Nicholas I Szécsi, the Palatine of Hungary (1385–1386) and Margit Debreceni, granddaughter of former palatine Dózsa Debreceni. He had three brothers, including Nicholas II, who served as Master of the treasury. He had no children.

He functioned as Ban of Szörény and Ispán of Temes County between 1393 and 1394. He held the office of Royal treasurer from November 1394 to May 1396. He was killed in the Battle of Nicopolis.

== Sources ==
- (in Hungarian) Engel, Pál (1996). Magyarország világi archontológiája, 1301–1457, I. ("Secular Archontology of Hungary, 1301–1457, Volume I"). História, MTA Történettudományi Intézete. Budapest. ISBN 963-8312-44-0.
- (in Hungarian) Markó, László: A magyar állam főméltóságai Szent Istvántól napjainkig – Életrajzi Lexikon p. 365. (The High Officers of the Hungarian State from Saint Stephen to the Present Days – A Biographical Encyclopedia) (2nd edition); Helikon Kiadó Kft., 2006, Budapest; ISBN 963-547-085-1.
- (in Hungarian) Soós, Ferenc (1999). Magyarország kincstartói, 1340–1540 ("Treasurers of Hungary, 1340–1540"). Budapest.
