= Thomas Szécsényi =

Hungarian baron and soldier

Thomas (I) Szécsényi

Judge royal
- Reign: 1349–1354
- Predecessor: Paul Nagymartoni
- Successor: Nicholas Drugeth
- Born: c. 1285
- Died: 1354
- Noble family: House of Szécsényi
- Spouses: 1, N Visontai; 2, Anna, Duchess of Oświęcim
- Issue: (1) Kónya (1) Michael (1) Stephen (2) Caspar (2) Ladislaus I (2) Anne
- Father: Farkas Kacsics

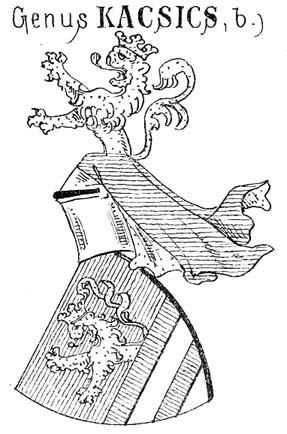
Coat of arms of the Szécsényi of the Kacsics clan

Thomas (I) Szécsényi (Hungarian: Szécsényi (I.) Tamás; died 1354) was a Hungarian powerful baron and soldier, who rose to prominence during King Charles I's war against the oligarchs. He belonged to the so-called "new aristocracy", who supported the king's efforts to restore royal power in the first decades of the 14th century. He was the first member of the influential Szécsényi family.

== Career ==
The son of Farkas from the gens Kacsics, he joined King Charles I against the powerful Matthew III Csák in 1301; therefore, his relatives who followed Csák occupied his inherited possessions in Nógrád County. He fought at the Battle of Rozgony (15 June 1312) when the king's armies defeated the allied troops of Matthew Csák and Amadeus Aba's sons.

Shortly afterwards, the king granted Thomas the possession of Hollókő that had been confiscated from his relatives. In 1316, he occupied the Visegrád Castle from Máté Csák. He became the head (ispán) of Arad, Bács and Syrmia counties (1318) and the Judge of the Cumans (1319). In 1320, he was appointed to the Master of the Queen's Treasury (királynéi tárnokmester). Between 1318 and 1334, he married one of Queen Elisabeth's relatives, Anna of Oświęcim as his second wife. Following Matthew Csák's death (1321), the king granted him several castles and possessions in Heves, Gömör and Nógrád counties; thus, he received Ajnácskő (today Hajnáčka in Slovakia), Baglyaskő, Bene, Somoskő (today Šomoška in Slovakia) and Sztrahora Castles. In the same year, he became the Voivode of Transylvania. He suppressed the rebellion of the Transylvanian Saxons (1324) and the king granted him Salgó Castle (today Sibiel in Romania). In 1342, he was appointed to the office of Master of the treasury (tárnokmester) and in 1349, he became Judge royal (országbíró).

== Sources ==
- Bárány, Attila (2011). "Debreceni Dózsa küzdelme a bihari oligarchákkal [Dózsa Debreceni's Struggle with Oligarchs in Bihar]". In Bárány, Attila; Papp, Klára; Szálkai, Tamás (eds.). Debrecen város 650 éves. Várostörténeti tanulmányok (in Hungarian). Debreceni Egyetem. Történelmi Intézet. pp. 75–126. ISBN 978-963-821-6465.
- Bertényi, Iván (1976). Az országbírói intézmény története a XIV. században [History of the Institution of Judge Royal in the 14th Century] (in Hungarian). Hungarian Academy of Sciences. ISBN 963-05-0734-X.
- Engel, Pál (1988). "Az ország újraegyesítése. I. Károly küzdelmei az oligarchák ellen (1310–1323) [Reunification of the Realm. The Struggles of Charles I Against the Oligarchs (1310–1323)]". Századok (in Hungarian). 122 (1–2). Magyar Történelmi Társulat: 89–146. ISSN 0039-8098.
- Engel, Pál (1996). Magyarország világi archontológiája, 1301–1457, I. [Secular Archontology of Hungary, 1301–1457, Volume I] (in Hungarian). História, MTA Történettudományi Intézete. ISBN 963-8312-44-0.
- Kristó, Gyula (2003). "I. Károly király harcai a tartományurak ellen (1310–1323) [The Struggles of Charles I Against the Oligarchs (1310–1323)]". Századok (in Hungarian). 137 (2). Magyar Történelmi Társulat: 297–347. ISSN 0039-8098.
- Markó, László (2006). A magyar állam főméltóságai Szent Istvántól napjainkig: Életrajzi Lexikon [Great Officers of State in Hungary from King Saint Stephen to Our Days: A Biographical Encyclopedia] (in Hungarian). Helikon Kiadó. ISBN 963-208-970-7.
- Piti, Ferenc (2003). "Szécsényi Tamás [Thomas Szécsényi]". In Szentpéteri, József (ed.). Szürke eminenciások a magyar történelemben (in Hungarian). Kossuth Kiadó. pp. 24–25. ISBN 963-09-4499-5.
- Varga, Tibor Róbert (2001). "Adatok Szécsényi Tamás vajdai széken kívüli igazságszolgáltató tevékenységére [Datas to the Judicial Activity of Voivode Thomas Szécsényi]". In Weisz, Boglárka; Balogh, László; Szarka, József (eds.). Tanulmányok a középkorról (in Hungarian). University of Szeged. pp. 139–149. ISBN 963-482-536-2.
- Wertner, Mór (1893). "Szécsényi Tamás [Thomas Szécsényi]". Erdélyi Múzeum (in Hungarian). 10 (2): 119–134. ISSN 1453-0961.
- Zsoldos, Attila (2013). "Üres honor [Empty Honour]". In Kádár, Zsófia; Lakatos, Bálint; Zarnóczki, Áron (eds.). Archivariorum historicorumque magistra. Történeti tanulmányok Bak Borbála tanárnő 70. születésnapjára (in Hungarian). Magyar Levéltárosok Egyesülete. pp. 455–477. ISBN 978-963-87475-3-2.
- Zsoldos, Attila (2016). "Erdélyi háborúk a 14. század elején [Transylvanian Wars at the Beginning of the 14th Century]". In Pósán, László; Veszprémy, László (eds.). Elfeledett háborúk. Középkori csaták és várostromok (6–16. század) (in Hungarian). Zrínyi Kiadó. pp. 198–231. ISBN 978-963-3276-96-9.
- Zsoldos, Attila (2017). A Druget-tartomány története 1315–1342 [The History of the Druget Province 1315–1342] (in Hungarian). MTA Bölcsészettudományi Kutatóközpont Történettudományi Intézete. ISBN 978-963-4160-63-2.

Thomas House of Szécsényi Born: c. 1285 Died: 1354
Political offices
Preceded by Dózsa Debreceni	Voivode of Transylvania; 1321–1342	Succeeded by Nicholas Sirokai
Preceded by Demetrius Nekcsei	Master of the treasury Procurator; 1339–1342	Succeeded by Stephen Lackfi
Preceded by Stephen Lackfi	Master of the treasury 1342–1343	Succeeded by Stephen Lackfi
Preceded by Paul Nagymartoni	Judge royal 1349–1354	Succeeded by Nicholas Drugeth
