= Nicholas Szécsi =

Hungarian nobleman

- Palatine; Ban of Croatia and Dalmatia; Ban of Slavonia; Judge royal
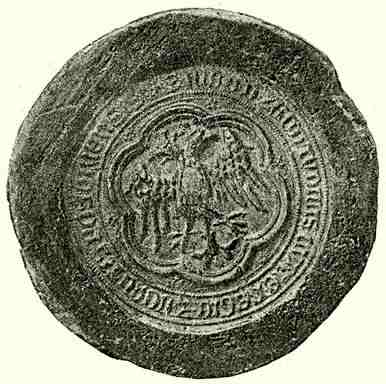
- Seal of Judge royal Nicholas Szécsi

Palatine of Hungary
- Reign: September 1385 – October 1386
- Predecessor: Nicholas Garai
- Successor: Stephen Lackfi
- Born: c. 1320
- Died: c. June or July 1387
- Noble family: House of Szécsi
- Spouse: Margaret Debreceni
- Issue: Nicholas II; Frank
- Father: Peter Szécsi
- Mother: Sebe Debrői

Nicholas Szécsi de Felsőlendva (Széchy; Hungarian: Miklós Szécsi; c. 1320 – c. June or July 1387) was a Hungarian nobleman from the influential House of Szécsi.

Son of Peter, Count of Nógrád, and Sebe Debrői. He married Margaret of Debrecen, they had four children. He was sent to Poland by King Louis I in 1345, when the Czechs laid siege to Kraków. Between 1346 and 1349, he served as the ban of Croatia. He took part in the King's second Neapolitan campaign, as well as in the unsuccessful 1352 campaign against the Lithuanian pagans, where he himself was wounded. Upon his return in 1354, he was made supreme count of Krassó.

Between 1358 and 1366 he served as ban of Croatia again, after which he served as the ban of Slavonia between 1366 and 1368.

Szécsi followed the King to Rome in 1370. He was named the ban of Croatia again between 1377 and 1380. He was also the ispán of Vas and of Pozsony between 1381 and 1382. He served as judge royal three times and finished his career as palatine during the reign of Louis I's daughter Mary.

== Sources ==
- (in Hungarian) Engel, Pál (1996). Magyarország világi archontológiája, 1301–1457, I. ("Secular Archontology of Hungary, 1301–1457, Volume I"). História, MTA Történettudományi Intézete. Budapest. ISBN 963-8312-44-0.
- (in Hungarian) Markó, László: A magyar állam főméltóságai Szent Istvántól napjainkig – Életrajzi Lexikon p. 253. (The High Officers of the Hungarian State from Saint Stephen to the Present Days – A Biographical Encyclopedia) (2nd edition); Helikon Kiadó Kft., 2006, Budapest; ISBN 963-547-085-1.

Nicholas I House of Szécsi Born: c. 1320 Died: c. June or July 1387
Political offices
Preceded by Denis Szécsi	Master of the stewards 1342–1346	Succeeded by Ivánka Szécsi
Preceded by Nicholas Hahót	Ban of Croatia and Dalmatia; Ban of Slavonia; 1346–1349	Succeeded by Paul Ugali
Preceded by Stephen Losonci	Ban of Severin; 1350–1355	Succeeded by Denis Lackfi
Preceded by Nicholas Drugeth	Judge royal 1355–1358	Succeeded by Nicholas Csák
Preceded by John Csúz	Ban of Croatia and Dalmatia; 1358–1366	Succeeded by Kónya Szécsényi
Preceded by Stephen Kanizsai governor	Ban of Slavonia; 1366–1368	Succeeded by Peter Cudar
Preceded by Stephen Bebek	Judge royal 1369–1372	Succeeded by James Szepesi
Preceded by Charles of Durazzo	Ban of Slavonia; 1372–1373	Succeeded by Peter Cudar
Preceded by Charles of Durazzo	Ban of Croatia and Dalmatia; 1374–1375	Succeeded by Charles of Durazzo
Preceded by Charles of Durazzo	Ban of Croatia and Dalmatia; 1376–1380	Succeeded by Emeric Bebek
Preceded by James Szepesi	Judge royal 1381–1384	Succeeded by Thomas Szentgyörgyi
Preceded by Nicholas Garai	Palatine of Hungary; 1385–1386	Succeeded by Stephen Lackfi
