= Széchy family =

House of Széchy
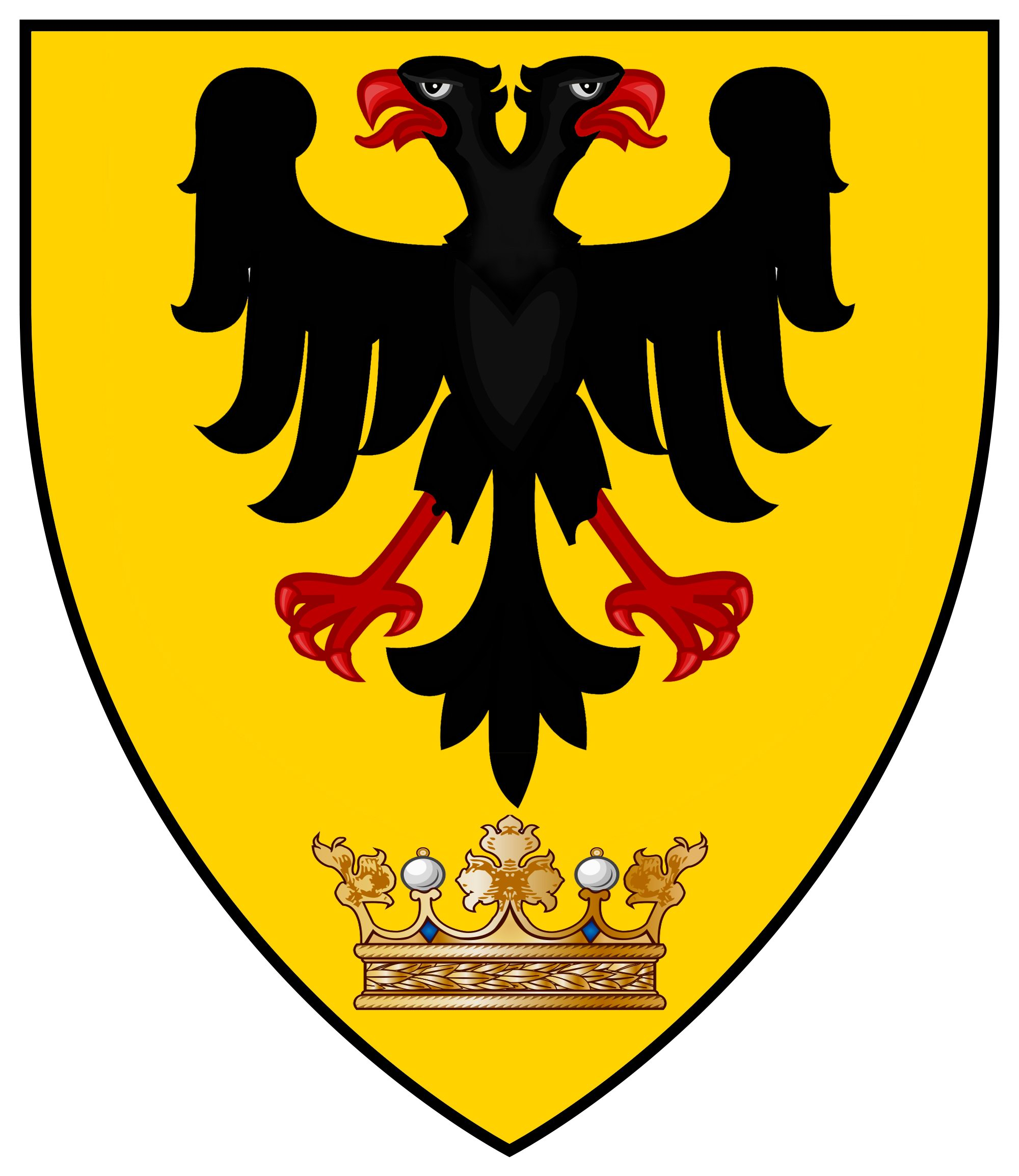
- Parent house: Genus Balog(h)
- Country: Kingdom of Hungary
- Founded: 13th century
- Founder: Ivánka
- Final ruler: István (Felsőlindva branch); Péter (Rimaszécs branch)
- Titles: Count Széchy de Rimaszécs
- Dissolution: 1535 (Felsőlindva branch); 1684 (Rimaszécs branch)
- Cadet branches: Felsőlindva branch Rimaszécs branch

The Széchy family or Szécsi was an old Hungarian noble family in the Kingdom of Hungary with notable members in the 13th, 14th and 15th centuries. The members of the Széchy family held high offices at the church and the royal court.

== History ==
The family had two branches (the branch Széchy de Rimaszécs and branch Széchy de Felsőlindva). They family derived from the Balogh genus (clan) and their first names were Zech, Zechi, Zeechi according to the documents. The family came up from the beginning of the 13th. Documents justify that Joanka de genere Balogh lived in the era of Béla IV of Hungary.

== Notable members of the family ==
=== Branch of Felsőlindva ===
- Nicholas Szécsi
- Nicholas (II) Szécsi
- Frank Szécsi
- Dénes Szécsi

=== Branch of Rimaszécs ===
- Dénes I.
- Mária Széchy

== See also ==
- List of titled noble families in the Kingdom of Hungary
