= Valkó County =

County of the Kingdom of Hungary

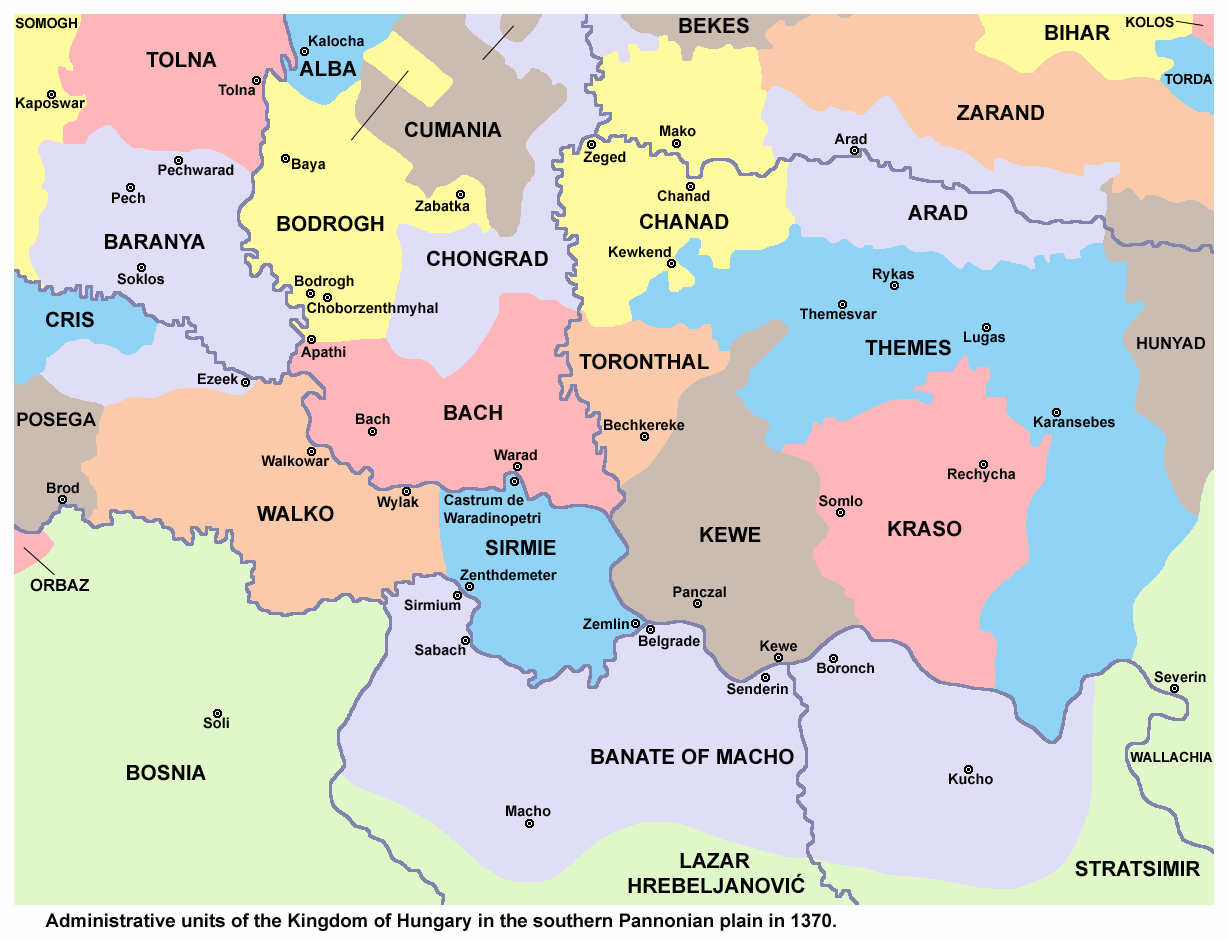
Valkó County (orange color) and neighbouring administrative units of the Kingdom of Hungary, in 1370

Valkó County (Hungarian: Valkó vármegye, Croatian: Vukovska županija, Serbian: Вуковска жупанија) was an administrative unit (county) of the medieval Kingdom of Hungary. It was established in the 13th century, and included most territories of the present day Vukovar-Syrmia County, in modern Croatia, and western parts of the present day Syrmia District, in modern Serbia. The most important cities of the county were Vukovar and Ilok. Its territory was conquered by the Ottoman Turks in the first half of the 16th century.

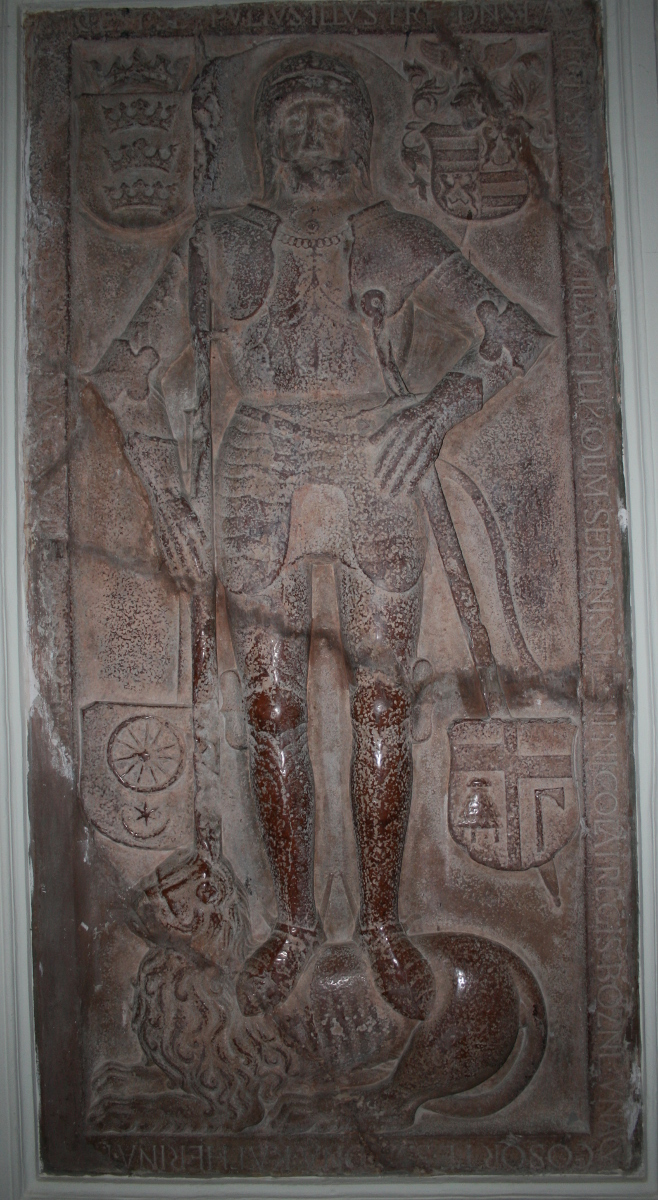
Gravestone of Lawrence of Ilok (died 1524), one of the most notable nobles from the Valkó County

The region was liberated during the Austro-Turkish War (1683-1699), but the county was not reestablished, since its territory was incorporated into the newly created Syrmia County.

== See also ==
- Syrmia County (medieval)
- Sanjak of Syrmia
- Syrmia County
- Vukovar-Syrmia County
- Banate of Macsó
- House of Ilok
- Thomas Monoszló
- Lawrence of Transylvania
- Ugrin Csák
- Garai family

== Sources ==
- Ćirković, Sima (2004). The Serbs. Malden: Blackwell Publishing. ISBN 9781405142915.
- Engel, Pál (2001). The Realm of St. Stephen: A History of Medieval Hungary, 895-1526. London & New York: I.B.Tauris. ISBN 9781850439776.
- Fine, John Van Antwerp Jr. (1991) [1983]. The Early Medieval Balkans: A Critical Survey from the Sixth to the Late Twelfth Century. Ann Arbor, Michigan: University of Michigan Press. ISBN 0472081497.
- Fine, John Van Antwerp Jr. (1994) [1987]. The Late Medieval Balkans: A Critical Survey from the Late Twelfth Century to the Ottoman Conquest. Ann Arbor, Michigan: University of Michigan Press. ISBN 0472082604.
- Fodor, Pál; Dávid, Géza, eds. (2000). Ottomans, Hungarians, and Habsburgs in Central Europe: The Military Confines in the Era of Ottoman Conquest. Leiden: BRILL. ISBN 9004119078.
