= Vinkovci Technical College of Adult Education =

- Tehničko učilište Vinkovci-ustanova za obrazovanje odraslih
- Type: adult education
- Established: 2002
- Principal: Ante Gale
- Location: Ljudevita Gaja 18, 32 100 Vinkovci, Vinkovci, Vukovar, Ilok, Vukovar-Srijem County, Croatia
- Campus: urban
- Colours: Yellow, Blue
- Website: Official site

Vinkovci Technical College of Adult Education (Croatian: Tehničko učilište Vinkovci-ustanova za obrazovanje odraslih) is adult education institution based in Vinkovci, Croatia. Institution offer courses in primary, secondary, vocational and programs of information technology education. Institution have two additional campuses in Vukovar and Ilok. In its work, institution collaborates with local Croatian Employment Service through their public tenders.

== Partner institutions ==
- Croatia, Zagreb, Algebra College

== See also ==
- Vinkovci
- Adult education
