= Nicholas Kont =

Croato-Hungarian nobleman

- Lord of Orahovica
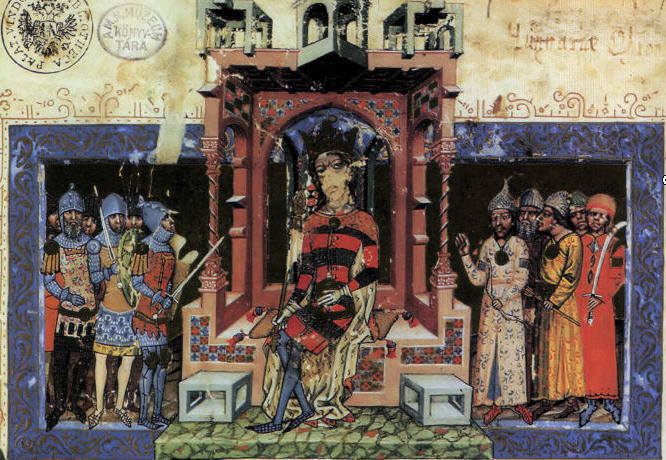
- Nicholas Kont among the court dignitaries with Louis I (Chronicon Pictum)

Palatine of Hungary
- Reign: March 1356 – April 1367
- Predecessor: Nicholas Zsámboki
- Successor: Vladislaus II of Opole
- Full name: Nicholas Kont de Orahovica
- Born: Unknown
- Died: before 16 April 1367; Orahovica, Kingdom of Croatia (within the Kingdom of Hungary)
- Noble family: House of Ilok
- Spouse: Klara Zsámboki
- Issue: Bartholomew II; Nicholas II; Catherine
- Father: Lawrence the Tót

Nicholas Kont of Orahovica (Croatian: Nikola Kont Orahovički, Hungarian: raholcai Kont Miklós; *? - † before 16 April 1367) was a Croato-Hungarian nobleman, very powerful and influential in the royal court of king Louis the Angevin, serving as Count palatine. He was the forefather and founder of the Iločki noble family (Hungarian: Újlaki család).

== Life and career ==
Nicholas was a descendant of a noble family originating from the area of Dubica district in medieval Lower Slavonia. His father was Lawrence (Lőrinc) the Tót, who served as Master of the Treasury and Ban of Slavonia. He had two brothers, Bartholomew (Bertalan) and Leukus (Lökös), both of them functioned as Master of Cup-bearers.

Having served in the king Louis' army during military campaigns on the present-day Italian soil, he got the nickname Kont (from Italian: conte = count). The adjective Orahovički was attributed to his name since his father Lovro /Lawrence/ gained the Orahovica estate, including large Ružica Castle. He was born at the beginning of the 14th century and had two brothers, Bartol /Bartholomew/ and Leukus, who performed important functions at the royal court as well (cup-bearer, chief retainer), but did not managed to achieve his glory.

In the middle of the 14th century Nicholas became one of the leading magnates of the king and was given the new titles and properties. In the period between 1343 and 1367 he was the knight of Udvar, royal cup-bearer (1345–1351), Voivode of Transylvania (1351-1356) and finally Count Palatine (1356–1367). In the meantime he served as Ispán of several counties in Croatia and Hungary (Sopron, Varaždin, Vas, Szolnok, Sáros etc.).

In his military career he distinguished himself especially in some battles in Italy. In the 1347-1348-war he commanded, together with John Garai (uncle of Nicholas I Garai), the military unit that conquered L'Aquila, and in 1350, during the siege of Aversa, he became commander-in-chief of king's forces, after Stephen Lackfi had been removed. He commanded the Louis' army during the campaign against medieval Banate of Bosnia (ruled by future king Tvrtko I Kotromanić) in 1363, and against Bulgaria in 1365. Although formally Kotromanić was Louis' vassal, the latter undertook military action because of Bosnian heretics. The campaign was unsuccessful.

When the Ilok branch of the Hungarian noble family Csák died out in 1364, the king gave the Ilok fief to Nicholas and his nephew Ladislaus, the son of Leukus. So the Orahovica family transferred its seat in 1365 to Ilok and soon after that Nicholas's descendants started to call themselves Iločki/Újlaki.

He married Klara Zsámboki, daughter of Kont's predecessor, Palatine Nicholas Zsámboki (or Gilétfi). When Nicholas Kont died in 1367, he was succeeded by his two sons, Nicholas II (†1397) and Bartholomew II (†1393), who however did not reach the power and glory of their father. His only daughter Catherine was the wife of Frank Szécsényi.

== Castles ==
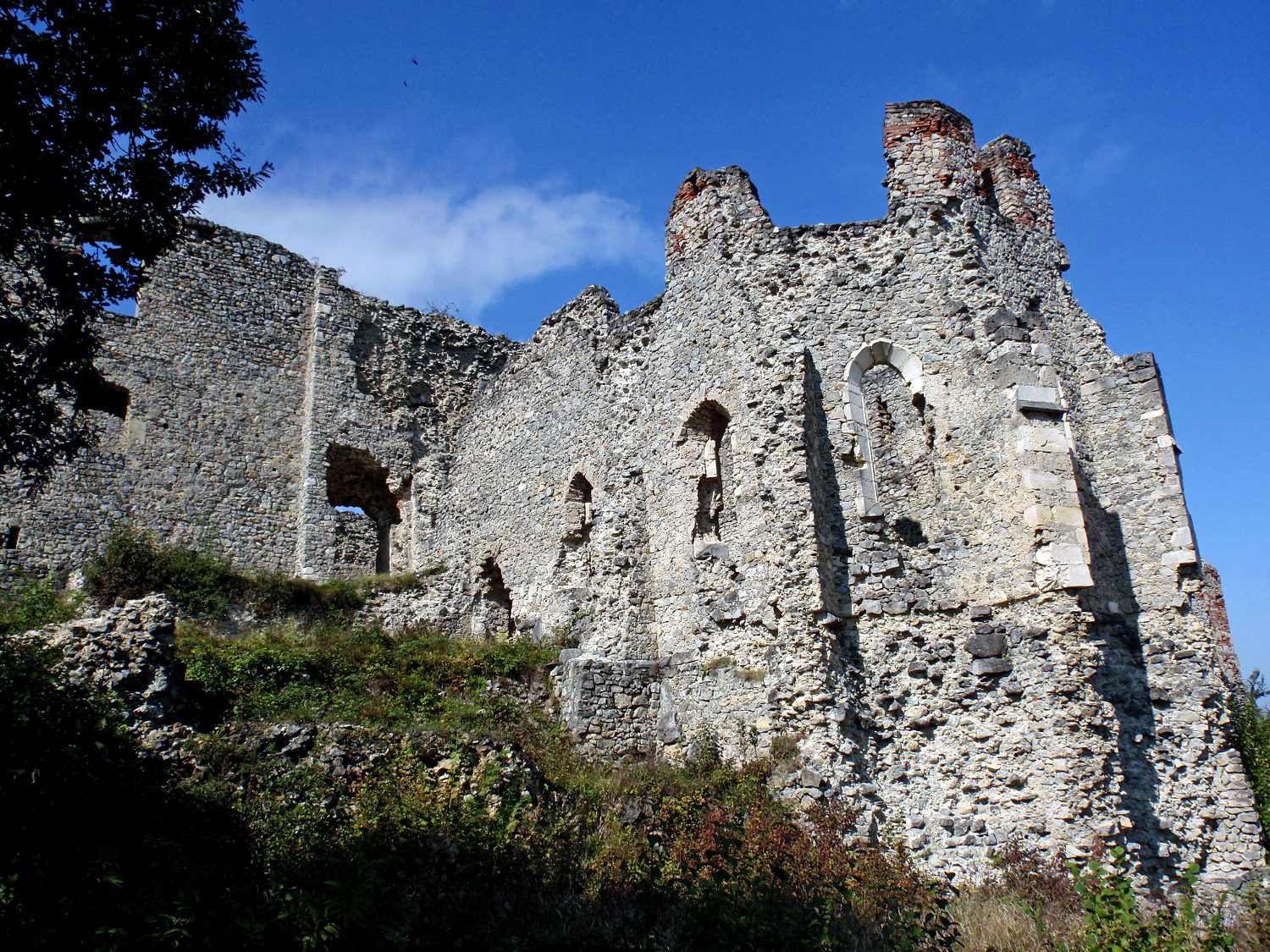
Ružica Castle at Orahovica in Slavonia

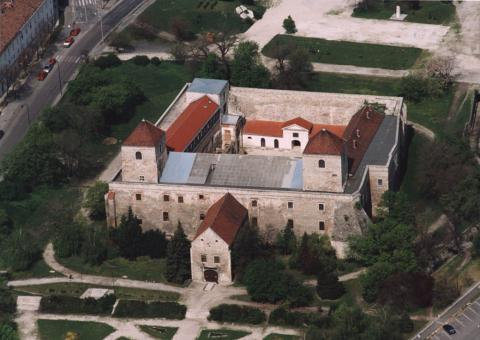
Palota (Várpalota)near Veszprém in Hungary

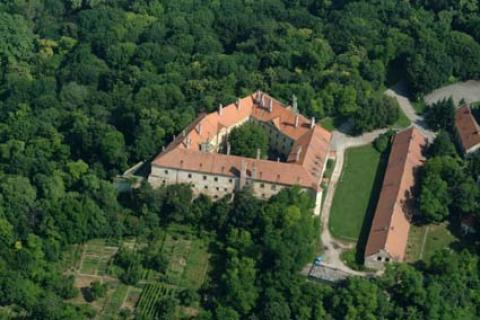
Galgóc (present-day Hlohovec) in Slovakia

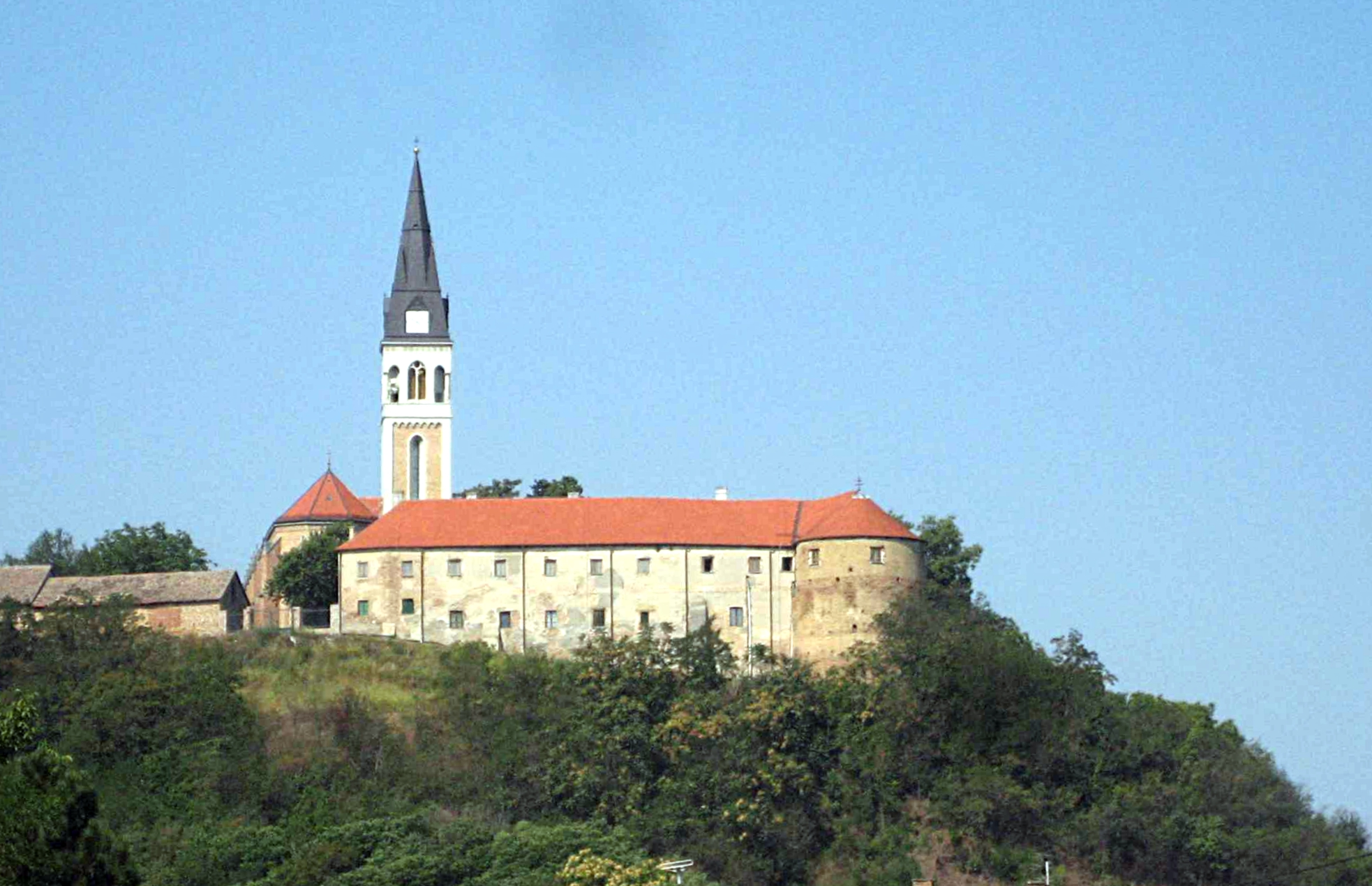
Fortified town Ilok in Srijem

== See also ==
- Orahovica
- Ilok
- House of Ilok
- Nicholas of Ilok
- Ladislaus of Ilok
- Louis the Angevin

Political offices
Preceded by Nicholas Drugeth	Master of the cupbearers 1345–1351	Succeeded by Bartholomew Orahovički
Preceded by Thomas Gönyűi	Voivode of Transylvania; 1351–1356	Succeeded by Andrew Lackfi
Preceded by Nicholas Zsámboki	Palatine of Hungary; 1356–1367	Succeeded by Vladislaus II of Opole
