= Újlaki family =

House of Újlaki
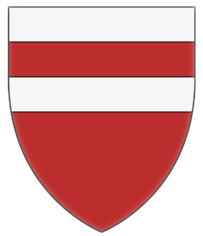
- Current region: Vukovar-Srijem County, Croatia
- Earlier spellings: Orahovički
- Origin: Dubica (medieval Lower Slavonia)
- Founded: 13th century (Újlaki since 1364)
- Founder: Gug
- Final ruler: Lawrence Újlaki
- Estates: Ilok, Orahovica, Ružica, Várpalota (in Hungary), Galgóc/Hlohovec (in Slovakia)
- Dissolution: 1524

The Újlaki family (Croatian: Iločki; Croatian pronunciation: [ilotʃki]; in old sources de Illoch, de Wylak, de Voilack etc.; Hungarian: Újlaki) was a Croatian-Hungarian noble family, descended in the male line from Gug (in some sources Göge), a member of the lower nobility in the region of Lower Slavonia during the 13th century.

The Újlaki or Iločki, meaning "those of Ilok" (Hungarian: Újlak), rose to be a powerful and influential family in the Kingdom of Hungary and Croatia during the period in the Late Middle Ages history marked by dynastic struggles for the possession of the throne and the Ottoman wars in Europe that affected the country. Notable members of the family were Bans of Croatia, Voivodes of Transylvania, Palatines of Hungary, ispáns or župans (counts), king's chamberlains and king's chief retainers. One of them, Nicholas Újlaki, the most powerful and most famous member of the family, was nominal King of Bosnia from 1471 until 1477.

== Family history ==
=== Sources of family origin ===
The family was a scion of the noble clan known as Orahovički (Hungarian: Raholcai), according to their estate Orahovica in medieval Križevci County. Gug, the oldest known ancestor of the family, possessed estates in the area of Dubica district in Lower Slavonia, and that is why the historians believe that the family originated from there. Gug's successors later gained some other estates in Croatia (Zrin, Bukovica, Viljevo and Jošava), as well as in Hungary (Palota and Galgóc). In 1364 King Louis I gave them Ilok Castle together with its estate, and thus they became Újlaki/Iločki.

=== Rise of the family ===
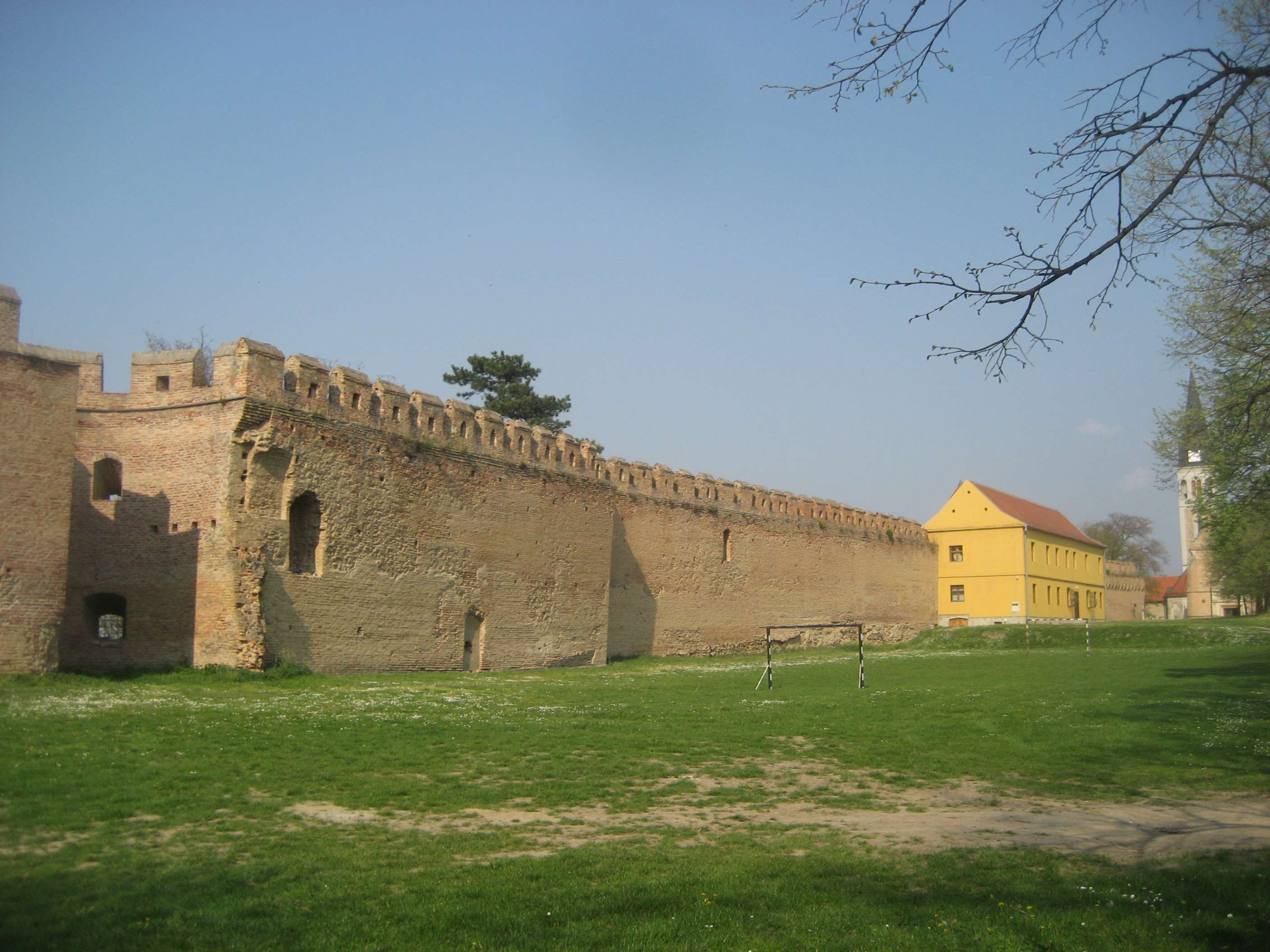
Ilok Castle was the seat of the family

Gug had three sons: John, Gregory and Stephen. John was first mentioned in 1281 as royal commissioner who introduced and helped Peter Tétény, Ban of Slavonia, to enter into possession of an estate at river Ilova. His sons Lawrence, Ugrin, Aegidius, James and John II took part in King Charles' military formations during several wars. Lawrence, called The Slav, (Latin: Sclavus, Hungarian: Tót), achieved to be the king's flag-bearer since 1312, castellan of Šintava Castle (1328), ispán of Nyitra (1340), Varaždin, Sopron and Vas Counties, and finally the Master of the treasury (1344). When he died in 1349, his three sons (Nicholas I, Bartholomew and Leukus) managed to consolidate and improve the rising power of the family.

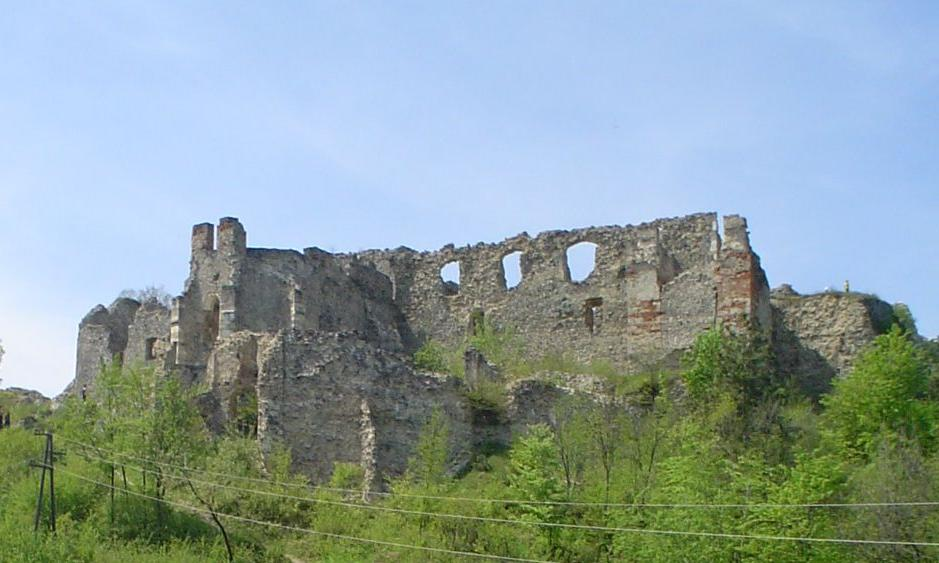
Ružica Castle, was and still is one of biggest fortifications in Slavonia

Nicholas I, called Kont, spent some time in Italy leading the army of King Louis I in his military campaigns and during his stay there earned this nickname (from Italian: conte = count). In the middle of 14th century Nicholas Kont became one of the leading magnates of the king and was given the new titles and properties. In the period between 1345 and 1351 he was Master of the cupbearers, then Voivode of Transylvania (1351–1356) and finally Palatine of Hungary (1356–1367). In the meantime he served as ispán of several counties in Croatia and Hungary (Sopron, Varaždin, Vas, Szolnok, Sáros etc.). In 1363 he commanded the army of the king in his Bosnian campaign against Tvrtko Kotromanić, Ban of Bosnia, and was defeated. Later, in 1365, he fought against the Bulgarians.

When the Újlak branch of the Hungarian noble kindred Csák died out in 1364, King Louis I gave the Ilok fief to Nicholas I and his nephew Ladislaus, the son of Leukus. So the Orahovički family transferred its seat to Ilok and soon after that they called themselves Újlaki/Iločki (lit. "of Ilok"). Nicholas' brothers Bartholomew (†1352) and Leukus (†1359) served as Master of the cupbearers and Master of the stewards, respectively. When Nicholas I died in 1367, he was succeeded by two of his sons, Nicholas II (†1397) and Bartholomew II (†1393), who did not reach the power and glory of their father. Two sons of Bartholomew from the next generation of the family, Ladislaus II (†1418) and Emeric (†1419) were Bans of Macsó. Emeric's daughter Martha married Nikola Frankopan (†1432), the mighty Prince of Krk, Senj and Modruš, and bore him eleven children.

=== Peak of the power and extinction ===
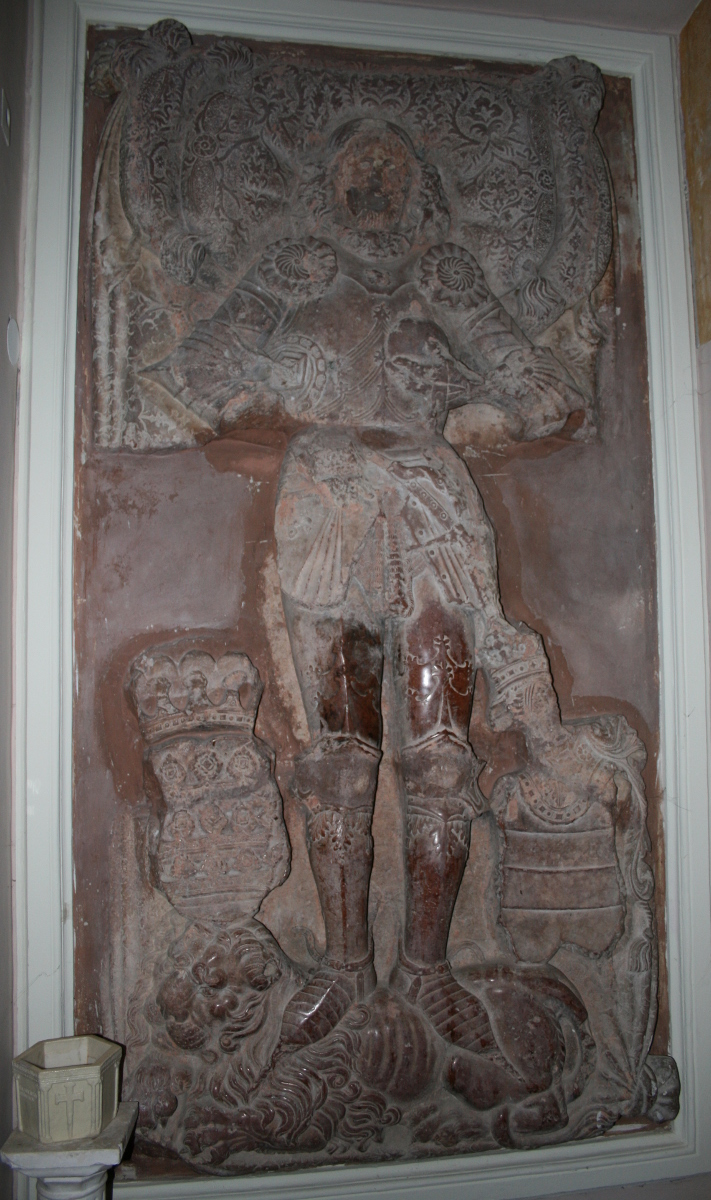
Gravestone of Nicholas Újlaki (1410–1477) in the Church of St. John of Capistrano in Ilok, Croatia

Ladislaus Újlaki (†1418) was succeeded by five of his sons: John III, Stephen III, Nicholas V, Peter and Paul. The most significant and notable of them was Nicholas V (*1410; †1477), Ban of Croatia, Slavonia, Macsó and Ózora, Voivode of Transylvania and nominal King of Bosnia (1471–1477), who managed to reach the peak of family's power, wealth and influence. His seat was in the town of Ilok, which experienced its "golden age" during his reign.

Having lived in turbulent times (dynastical struggles with frequent changes on the throne and continual Ottoman threat and expansion), Nicholas adjusted himself to the current circumstances, sometimes changing sides and alliances radically. After supporting King Albert's widow Elizabeth of Luxembourg and her little son Ladislaus the Posthumous in 1439, Nicholas soon took the side of the new king Vladislaus I Jagiellon. When the king died in the Battle of Varna in 1444, Nicholas became a member of the royal council. On the election of Matthias Corvinus in 1458, he, like many other noblemen in the kingdom, did not recognize him as king at once, but later, as soon as they peacefully settled the dispute between them.

In his two marriages Nicholas V had eight children, among which four sons, but only one of them, Lawrence, survived him and became his successor. Lawrence (*1459; †1524), Ban of Macsó, Duke of Bosnia and Judge royal, retained most of the power and reputation of the family. After the death of king Matthias Corvinus in 1490, he supported his illegitimate son John Corvinus to be the king, but he did not succeed. Later he allied himself with Maximilian I of Habsburg, the Holy Roman Emperor, who fought the newly elected king Vladislaus II Jagiellon. However, he reconciled himself to Vladislaus II in 1496 and performed several high state duties after that. Lawrence had no successors, and when he died in 1524, the Újlaki family became extinct.

== Most notable members of the family ==
- Lawrence I, called The Slav (Tót), (†1349), king's flag-bearer, castellan, ispán and royal chamberlain
- Nicholas I, called Kont, (†1367), son of Lovro I, ispán, royal cup-bearer, Voivode (duke) of Transylvania, Palatine of Hungary
- Ladislaus (†1418), grandson of Nicholas I, Ban of Macsó
- Nicholas V (*1410; †1477), son of Ladislaus, Ban (viceroy) of Croatia, Slavonia, Macsó and Usora, Voivode (duke) of Transylvania and nominal King of Bosnia
- Lawrence III (*1459; †1524), son of Nicholas V, Macsó, Herceg (duke) of Bosnia and Judge royal

== See also ==
- List of rulers of Croatia
- List of rulers of Bosnia
- List of palatines of Hungary
- History of Croatia
- History of Bosnia
- History of Hungary
- Ilok
