= Ilok Castle =

Castle in Croatia

Coordinates: 45.224038°N 19.375361°E

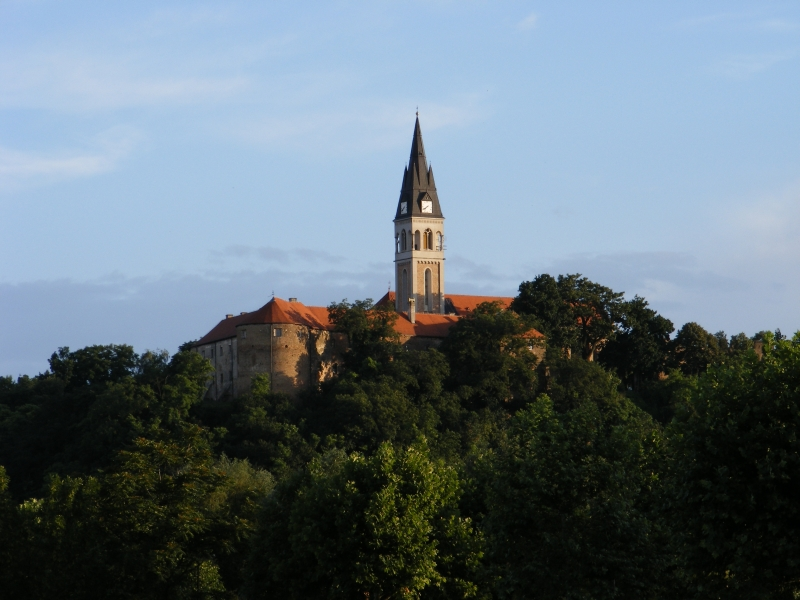
Ilok Castle

Ilok Castle (Croatian: Iločki dvorac or Gradina Ilok) or Odescalchi Castle overlooks the town of Ilok in eastern Croatia. It is built on a hill above the town centre, offering views on the Danube and the Pannonian Plain.

The castle was originally built in the 15th century by Nicholas of Ilok, Croatian viceroy and the king of Bosnia. The Ottomans conquered Ilok in the 16th century. After the victory against the Ottomans at the Battle of Vienna in 1683, the Emperor Leopold I granted the castle, significant properties and the title of the Duke of Syrmia to Livio Odescalchi, nephew of Pope Innocent XI and a member of the powerful Italian aristocratic Odescalchi family, which would own the castle for the next two centuries. In the 18th century, the Odescalchis reconstructed the castle in the Baroque style. The castle was nationalized by authorities of Yugoslavia in 1945. After a restoration, it was opened to visitors in 2010. The lower two floors host the Museum of the Town of Ilok. Wine cellars of the castle are among the most famous in Croatia.
