= Church of St. Michael the Archangel, Ilok =

Serbian Orthodox church in Ilok, Croatia

Church of the Saint Archangel Michael
- Црква светог Архангела Михаила
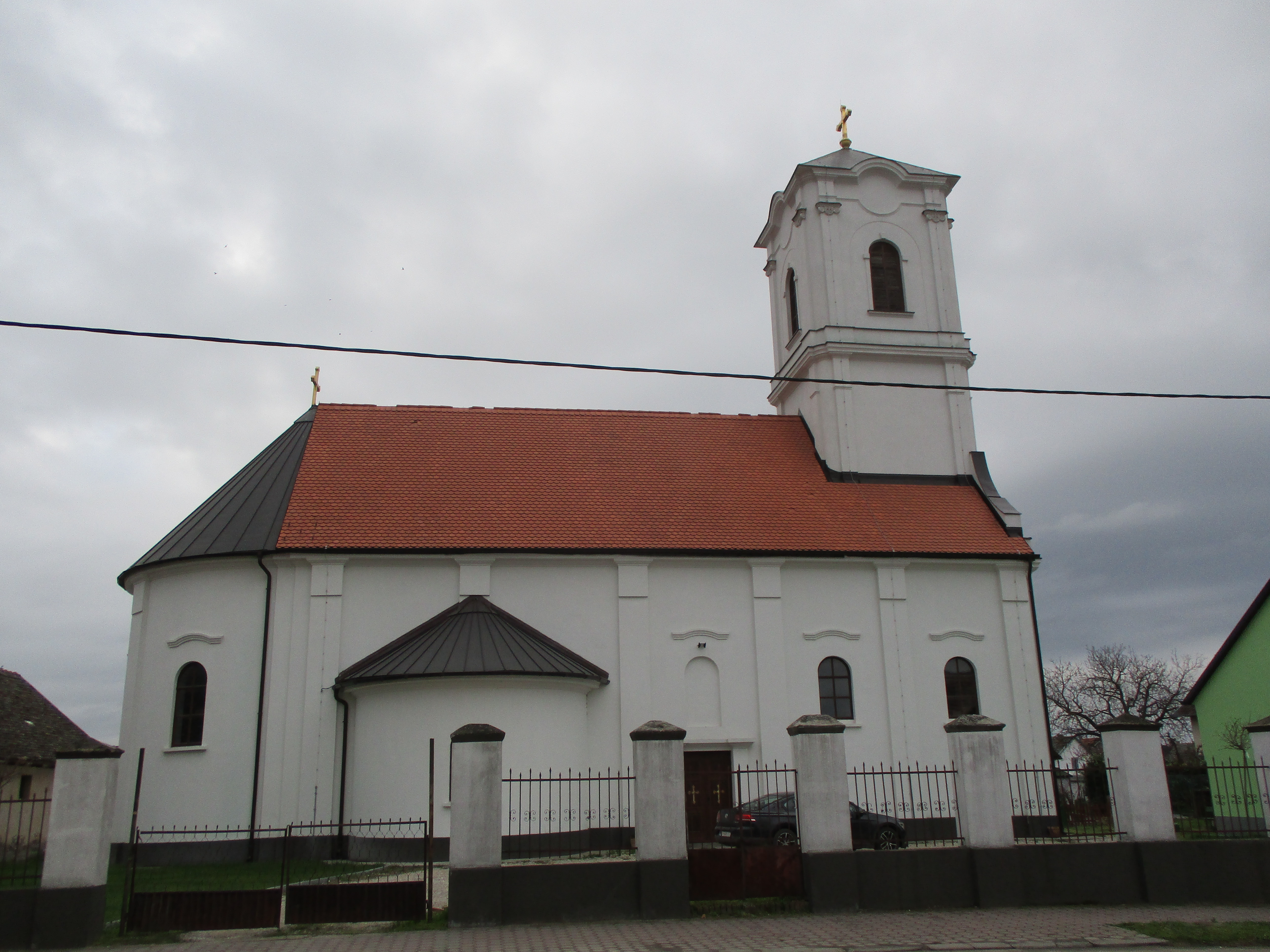
- Church of the Saint Archangel Michael
- Church of the Saint Archangel Michael
- 45.2232°N 19.3700°E
- Location: Ilok
- Country: Croatia
- Denomination: Serbian Orthodox Church

History
- Status: Church
- Dedication: Archangel Michael

Architecture
- Functional status: Active
- Style: Baroque
- Years built: 2016 (identical to previous building from 1802-1942)

Administration
- Archdiocese: Eparchy of Srem

Church of the Saint Archangel Michael (Serbian Cyrillic: Црква светог Архангела Михаила, Croatian: Crkva svetog Arhangela Mihaila) in Ilok is a Serbian Orthodox church in eastern Croatia. Contemporary church was built in 2016 as an exact copy of the previous church which was built at the same location between 1798 and 1802 and which was destroyed in 1942 during the Genocide of Serbs in the Independent State of Croatia during the World War II in Yugoslavia. An older Serbian Orthodox church was constructed further away from the centre of the town in 1702 but at the time of construction of the new church that building was already ruined.

Together with the Church of St. George, Tovarnik and Church of the Holy Venerable Mother Parascheva it is one of three churches under the spiritual jurisdiction of the Eparchy of Srem with the seat in Sremski Karlovci, contrary to most of the other Serbian Orthodox churches in eastern Croatia that are under the spiritual jurisdiction of the Eparchy of Osječko polje and Baranja.

Reconstruction of the current building was supported by the Ministry of Culture of Croatia, Ministry of Culture of Serbia, municipalities of Bačka Palanka, Stara Pazova, Srbijagas company, the Town of Ilok and the Vukovar-Syrmia County. The first effort at reconstruction of the building was initiated in 1992 at the time of the Croatian War of Independence when the region was a part of self-proclaimed SAO Eastern Slavonia, Baranja and Western Syrmia. At that time majority of ethnic Croats were expelled from the town while number of Serbs from the areas under the control of Croatian government moved to Ilok. The project of the new church was not completed before the reintegration of the region by UNTAES in 1998 leading to a political controversy over the issue which was resolved with the agreement that the exact copy of the previous church will be built. The event celebrating the completion of the reconstruction in 2016 brought together Serbian Orthodox Bishop of Srem, Vasilije Vadić, mayor of Ilok Marina Budimir and her deputy Josip Kovač as well as representatives from the Office for Cooperation with Churches and Religious Communities, Vukovar-Syrmia County, Šid, Bačka Palanka and the Joint Council of Municipalities.

== See also ==
- Eparchy of Srem
- Serbs of Croatia
- List of Serbian Orthodox churches in Croatia
- Monasteries of Fruška Gora
- Patriarchate of Karlovci
- Petar Jovanović (metropolitan)
