= Ladislaus of Ilok =

Croato-Hungarian nobleman

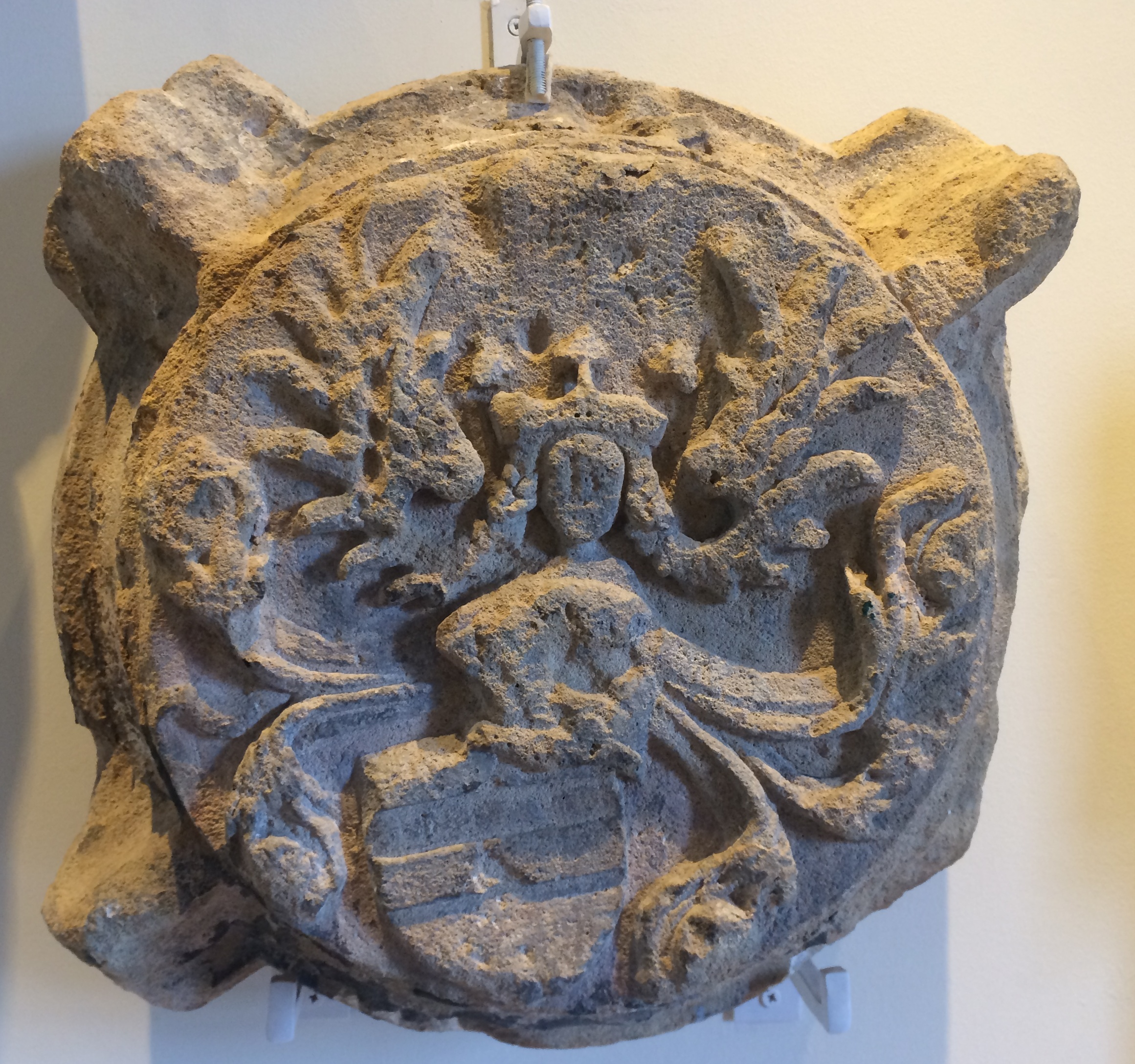
- Iločki family coat of arms

Ban of Macsó
- Reign: 1402–1403; 1410–1418
- Predecessor: Stephen & Thomas Ludányi (1st term); John Maróti (2nd term)
- Successor: John Maróti (1st term); Desiderius Garai (2nd term)
- Known for: Ban of Mačva (Macsó), Župan (count) of Baranja, Bodrog, Srijem, Vukovar and Tolna County
- Born: mid-14th century
- Died: 1418
- Residence: Ilok, Kingdom of Hungary-Croatia
- Spouse: Ana Štiborić
- Issue: Ivan III. (John), Stjepan III. (Stephen), Petar (Peter), Pavao (Paul), Nikola V (Nicholas)

Ladislaus of Ilok (in Latin sources Ladislaus de Wylak, de Illoch, de Voilack, Croatian: Ladislav Iločki, Hungarian: Újlaki László; c. mid-14th century – 1418) was a Croato–Hungarian nobleman, a member of the Iločki noble family (Hungarian: Újlaki család). He held the dignity of Ban of Macsó (Mačva) (1402–1403 and 1410–1418), as well as župan (ispán, count) of Baranya, Bodrog, Srijem, Vukovar and Tolna in the associated kingdoms Hungary and Croatia.

== Biography ==
He was born in the mid-14th century as the son of Bartol II (Bartholomew) of Ilok (†1393). He had a brother, Mirko (Emeric) (†1419). First mentioned in 1395 in a document issued by Nitra Cathedral chapter house, Ladislaus was the owner of Lack estate at the village of Gamás in Somogy County (southwestern Hungary). In 1400 he moved, together with his brother, to Palota in Veszprém County. Ladislaus was appointed as Ban of Macsó by King Sigismund of Luxembourg in September 1402. He served in this capacity alongside John Maróti. During the period of dynastic struggles between Ladislaus of Naples and Sigismund of Luxembourg at the beginning of the 15th century, which sparked into a nationwide rebellion against the monarch in 1403, Ladislaus, retaining his position, sided with Ladislaus of Naples, but, after Sigismund's victory, he swore loyalty and reconciled with the King. He became one of ten barons to be members of Sigismund's Curia, the King's Council. Ladislaus was granted amnesty upon the intervention of Nicholas Garai and the payment of 12,000 golden florins to the royal treasury.

The brothers Ladislaus and Emeric served as Bans of Macsó from 1410 to 1418. Besides their dignity in the royal court, the brothers served as župan/župan (ispán, count) of Baranya, Bodrog, Srijem, Tolna and Vukovar County. Ladislaus' seat was in Ilok (Újlak) and Orahovica (Raholca). He also possessed the castle of Galgóc in Nyitra County (present-day Hlohovec in Slovakia).

His wife was Ana Štiborić (Stiboricz), a daughter of Štibor Štiborić, who was a powerful aristocrat of Polish origin, Voivode of Transylvania and a close friend of King Sigismund. The couple had five children: Ivan III (John), Stjepan III (Stephen), Petar (Peter), Pavao (Paul) and Nikola V (Nicholas), but not all of them reached adulthood. Ladislaus was last mentioned in documents in February 1418 (his brother Emeric appears as sole Ban of Macsó in contemporary records already in April 1418). He was succeeded by his surviving sons Stjepan III and Nikola V.

== Sources ==
- Engel, Pál (1996). Magyarország világi archontológiája, 1301–1457, I. [Secular Archontology of Hungary, 1301–1457, Volume I] (in Hungarian). História, MTA Történettudományi Intézete. ISBN 963-8312-44-0.
- Mályusz, Elemér (1984). Zsigmond király uralma Magyarországon, 1387–1437 [The Rule of King Sigismund in Hungary, 1387–1437] (in Hungarian). Gondolat. ISBN 963-281-414-2.
