= Nicholas of Ilok =

Titular king of Bosnia

- King of Bosnia; Ban of Macsó, Croatia, Slavonia and Dalmatia; Voivode of Transylvania
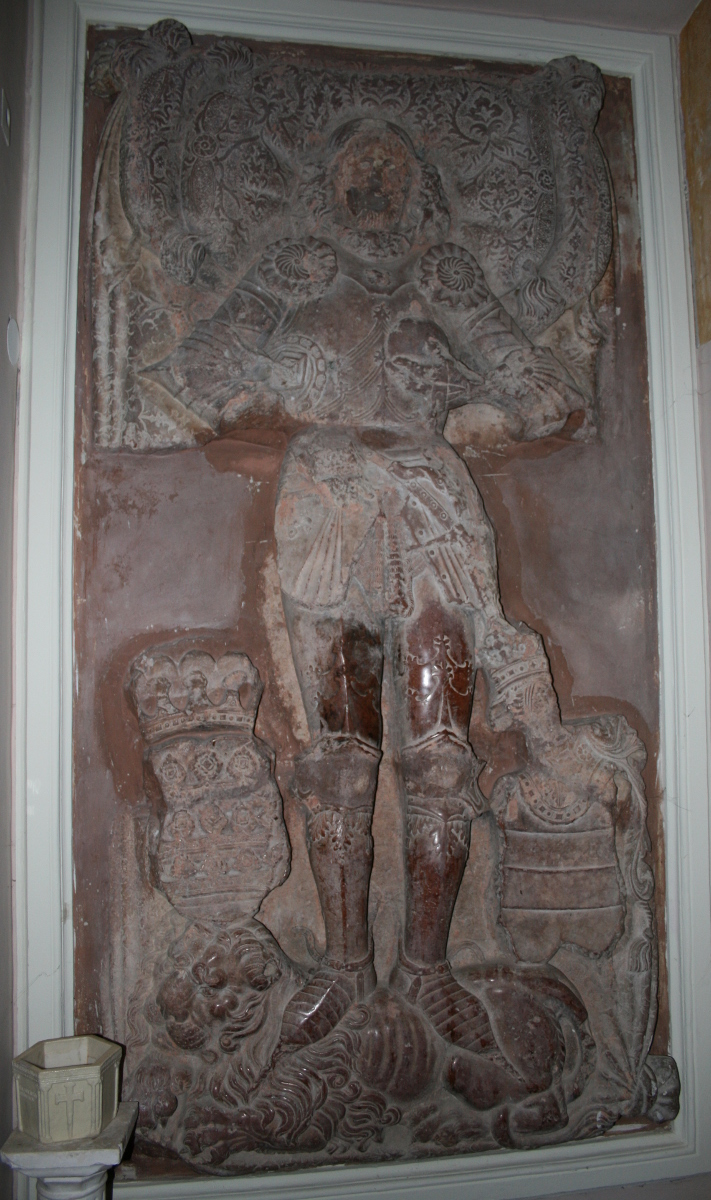
- Gravestone of Nikola Iločki in the Church of St. John of Capistrano in Ilok, Croatia
- Born: 1410; Ilok, Kingdom of Hungary (today's Croatia)
- Died: 1477 (aged 66–67)
- Burial: Ilok, Croatia
- Spouse: Margit Rozgonyi; Dorottya Széchy de Felsőlendva
- Issue more...: Lawrence of Ilok
- House: House of Ilok
- Father: Ladislaus, Ban of Macsó
- Mother: Anna Stiboriczi

Nicholas of Ilok (Hungarian: Újlaki Miklós, Serbo-Croatian: Nikola Iločki; 1410–1477) was a Hungarian nobleman, ban of Croatia, Slavonia, Dalmatia and Macsó, voivode of Transylvania and titular king of Bosnia from 1471 until his death.

A member of the Újlaki family, he was one of the richest landowners in the Kingdom of Hungary and one of its most influential magnates. He held a reputation of a great hero and served under four kings of Hungary: Albert, Vladislaus I, Ladislaus V and Matthias I.

== Early career ==
His parents were Ladislaus of Ilok, ban of Macsó, and Anna Stiboriczi, daughter of Stibor of Stiboricz, voivode of Transylvania. His father died shortly after his birth. He had four brothers: John, Stephen, Peter and Paul. His great-grandfather, Nicholas Kont, served as palatine to King Louis I of Hungary. Nicholas was the best known lord of the city of Ilok. While he was in power, the city experienced its golden age. In 1430, Nicholas' brother Stephen died and Nicholas succeeded him as ban of Macsó.

When King Albert died in 1439, Nicholas supported his widow, Elizabeth of Luxembourg, in her struggle to secure the Holy Crown of Hungary for her son, Ladislaus the Posthumous. As a reward, Queen Elizabeth had him knighted. However, Nicholas soon took the side of King Vladislaus III of Poland and allied himself with John Hunyadi. Upon becoming king of Hungary, Vladislaus gave Nicholas and Hunyadi extraordinary powers, appointing them as joint voivodes of Transylvania.

== Matthias' reign ==
In 1457, Nicholas took part in the liquidation of John Hunyadi's son, Ladislaus. The next year, Ladislaus' brother, Matthias Corvinus, was elected king, but various Hungarian and Croatian nobles refused to recognise him as their sovereign. The opposition was led by Nicholas himself and Palatine Ladislaus II Garay, who asked Holy Roman Emperor Frederick III for support. Matthias was eventually recognised as king.

Nicholas retained his influence throughout the reign of Matthias Corvinus, who created him perpetual ispán of Teočak in 1464, making him only the third person to bear such a title. In 1471, having settled his disputes with Nicholas, King Matthias I conferred upon him the title of king of Bosnia. He was crowned king in 1472 in the fortress of Jajce. Nicholas seems to have been made ban of Croatia, Slavonia and Dalmatia by early 1472, probably in order to secure his loyalty to the king and to enable him to defend the region against the Ottomans. He had been named ban to replace Blaise Magyar, who had rebelled against the king. He did not retain that office for long; by the end of the same year, he was replaced by Damian Horvat.

As king of Bosnia, Nicholas even minted his own currency. However, Nicholas failed to defend his satellite kingdom, losing most of it to the Ottomans. The Hungarian Kingdom of Bosnia consisted of a few fortresses. Nicholas ruled those remnants and retained the kingly title until his death, styling himself "Nicholas, by the Grace of God king of Bosnia" (Latin: Nicolaus Dei Gratia Rex Bosniae). He was succeeded, as ban of Macsó and lord of Ilok, by his eldest surviving son, Laurence.

== Marriages and issue ==
Nicholas was first married to Margit Rozgonyi (fl 1441-1458). By his first wife, Nicholas had the following children:

1. Nicholas (fl 1452)
2. Stephen (fl 1459-1465)
3. Catherine (fl. 1448-1493), whose daughter's sons claimed their great-grandfather's inheritance
4. Euphrosyne (fl. 1458-1476)
5. Hieronyma (fl 1458-1460), married to Leonhard of Gorizia
6. Ursula (fl 1458-1476)

He was married secondly to Dorottya Széchy de Felsőlendva (fl 1471-1495). Their children were:

1. Laurence (1459–1524), Nicholas' successor, after whose death without surviving issue the family became extinct
2. Bernard (fl 1460)

Royal titles
Vacant Title last held by Stephen Tomašević as actual king Matthias as Ottoman puppet	— TITULAR — King of Bosnia against Matija Vojsalić; 1471–1477	Vacant
Political offices
Preceded by Ladislaus Jakcs & Michael Jakcs	Voivode of Transylvania; 1441–1458 with John Hunyadi (1441–1446); Emeric Bebek (1446–1448); John Rozgonyi (1449–1458)	Succeeded by Ladislaus Kanizsai & John Rozgonyi & Sebastian Rozgonyi
Preceded by Ladislaus Kanizsai & Nicholas Kanizsai	Voivode of Transylvania; 1462–1465 with John Pongrácz	Succeeded by Bertold Ellerbach & Sigismund Szentgyörgyi & John Szentgyörgyi
Preceded by Blaise Magyar	Ban of Croatia; Slavonia and Dalmatia; 1472	Succeeded by Damian Horvat
Preceded by Stephen of Ilok	Ban of Macsó; 1430-1477	Succeeded by Laurence of Ilok
