= Ilok =

- Town
- Grad Ilok; Town of Ilok
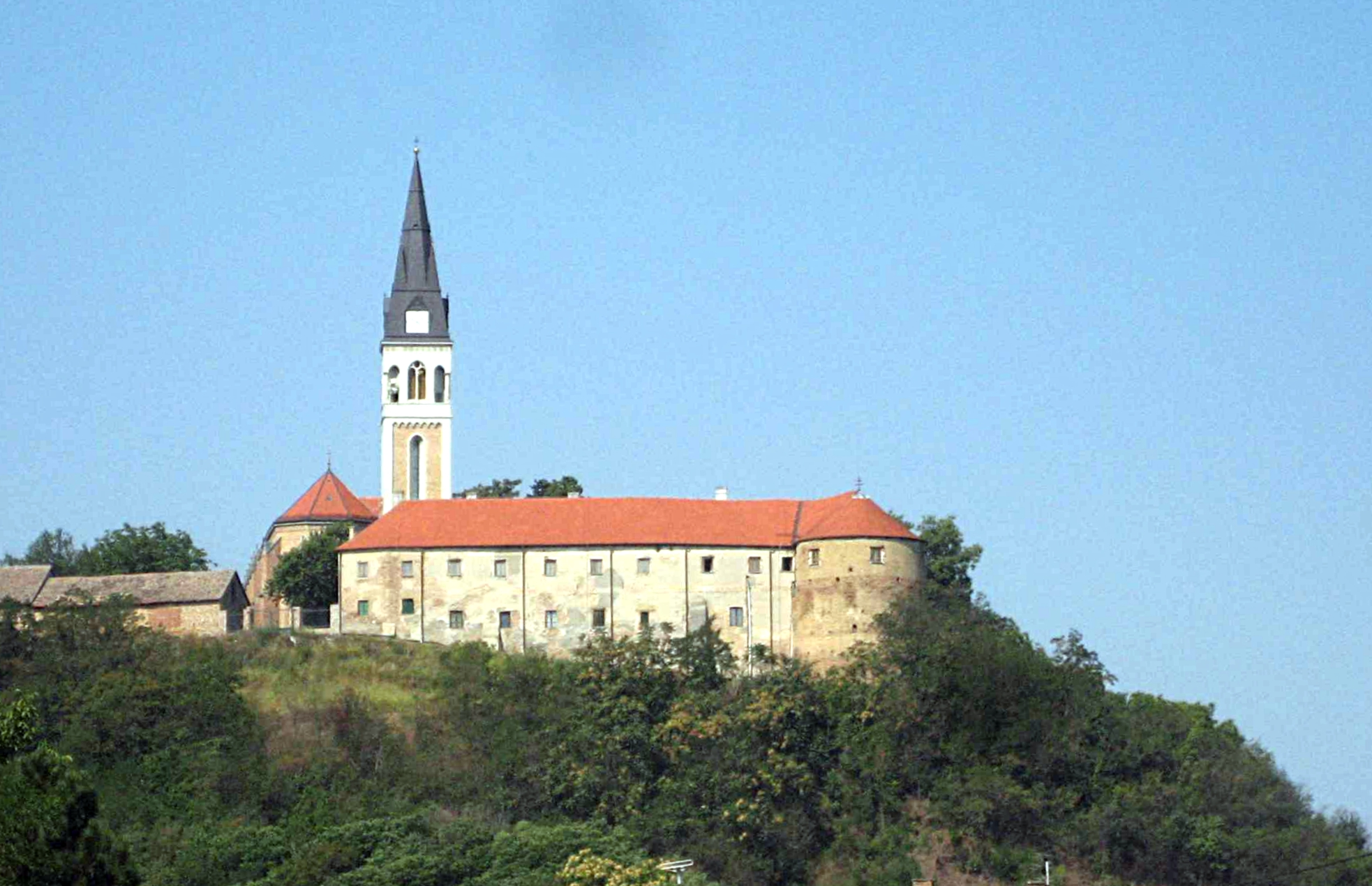
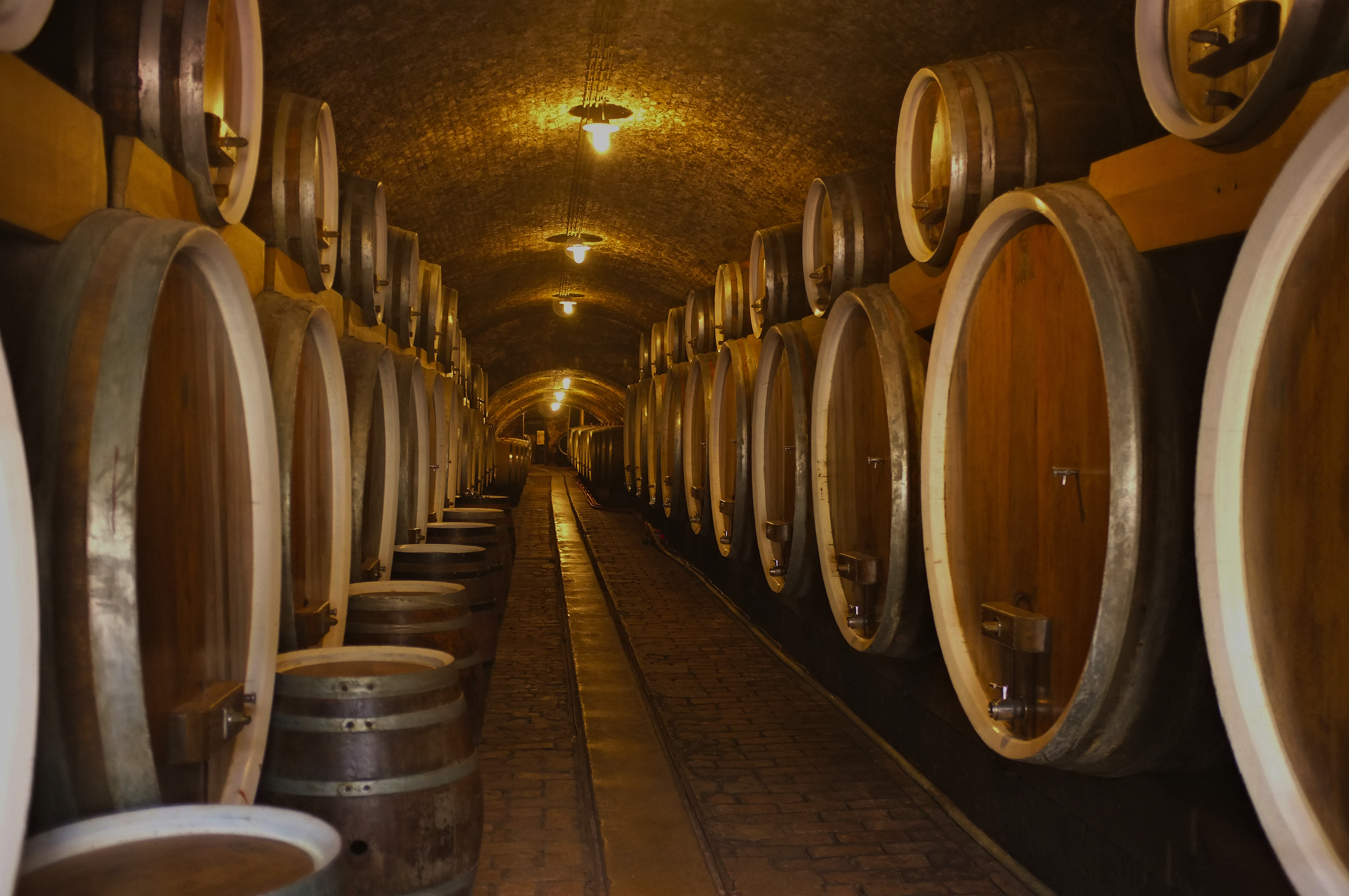
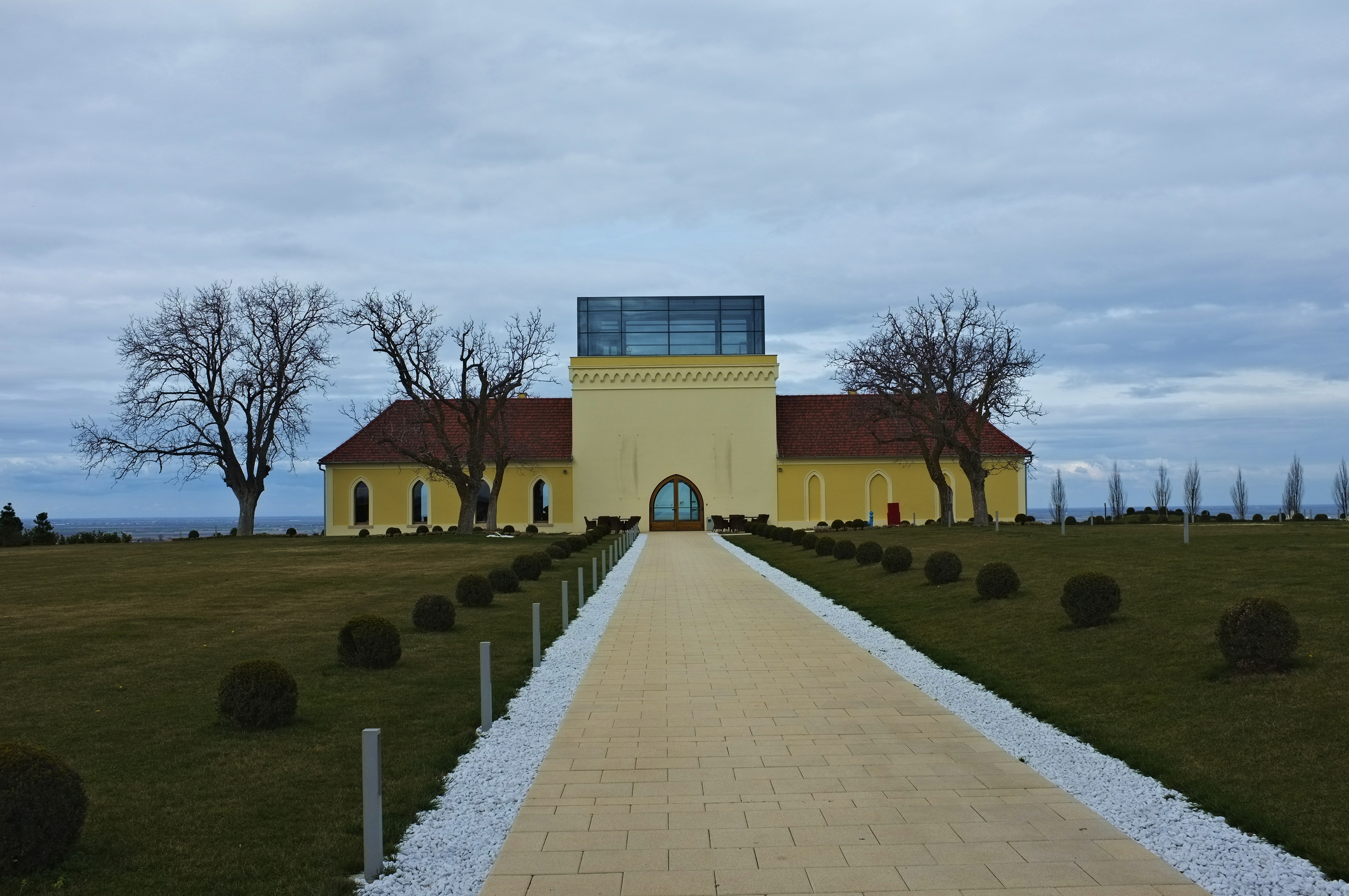
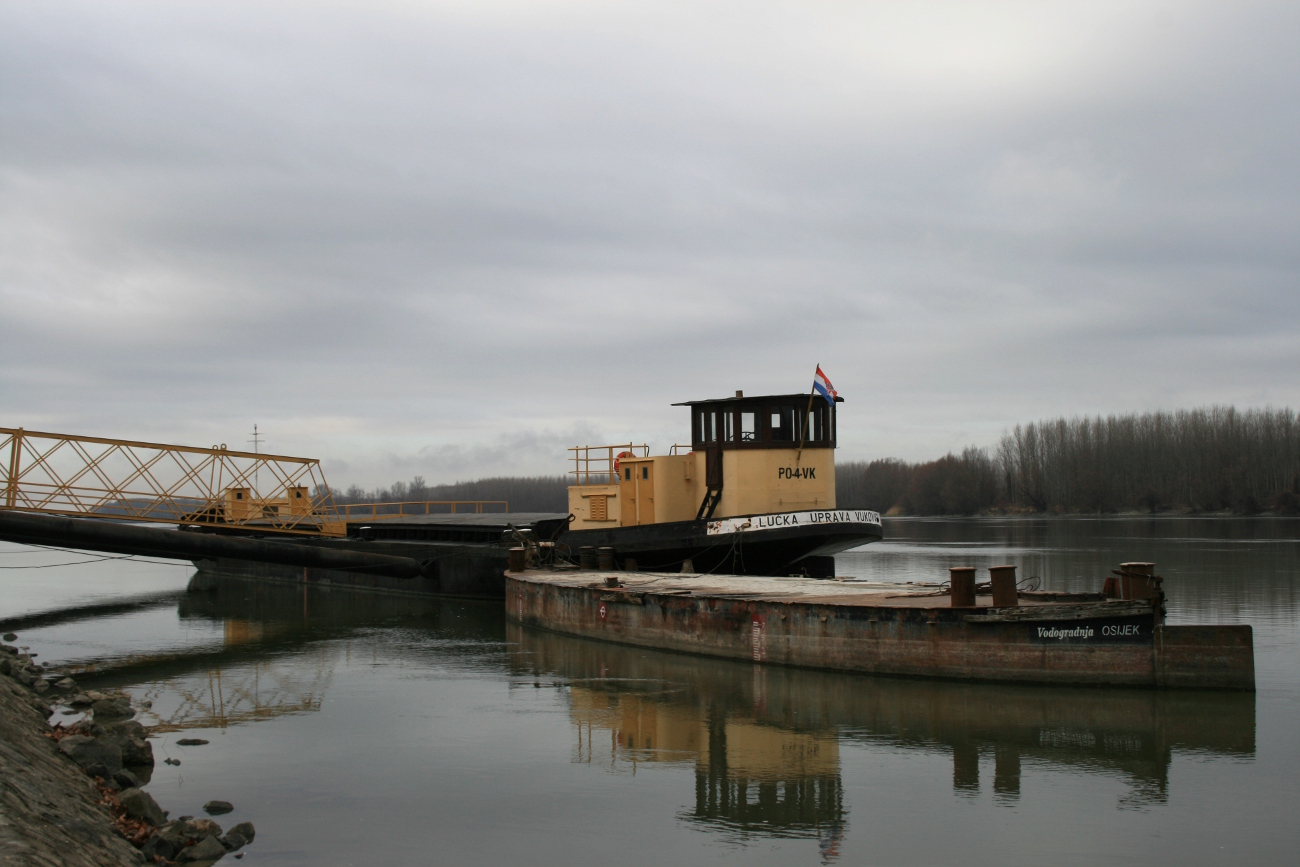
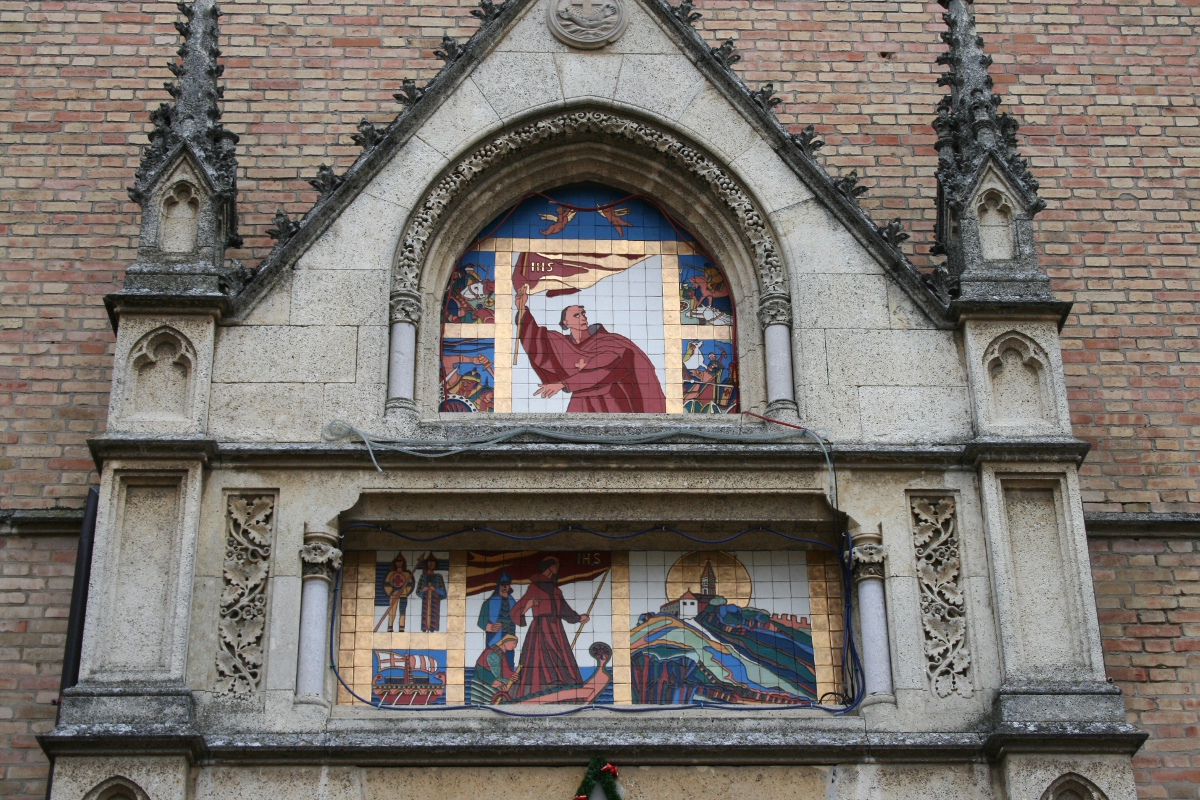
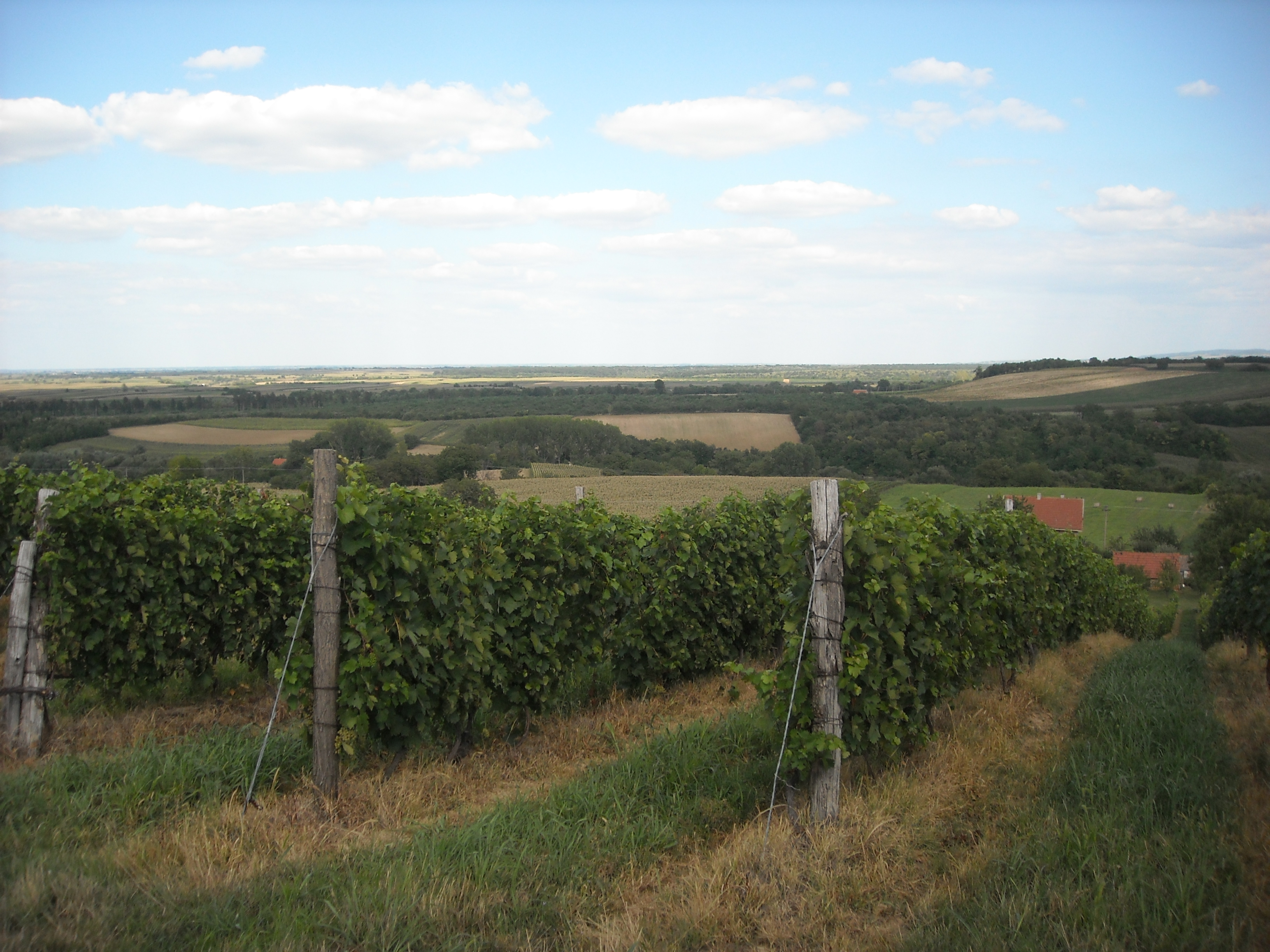
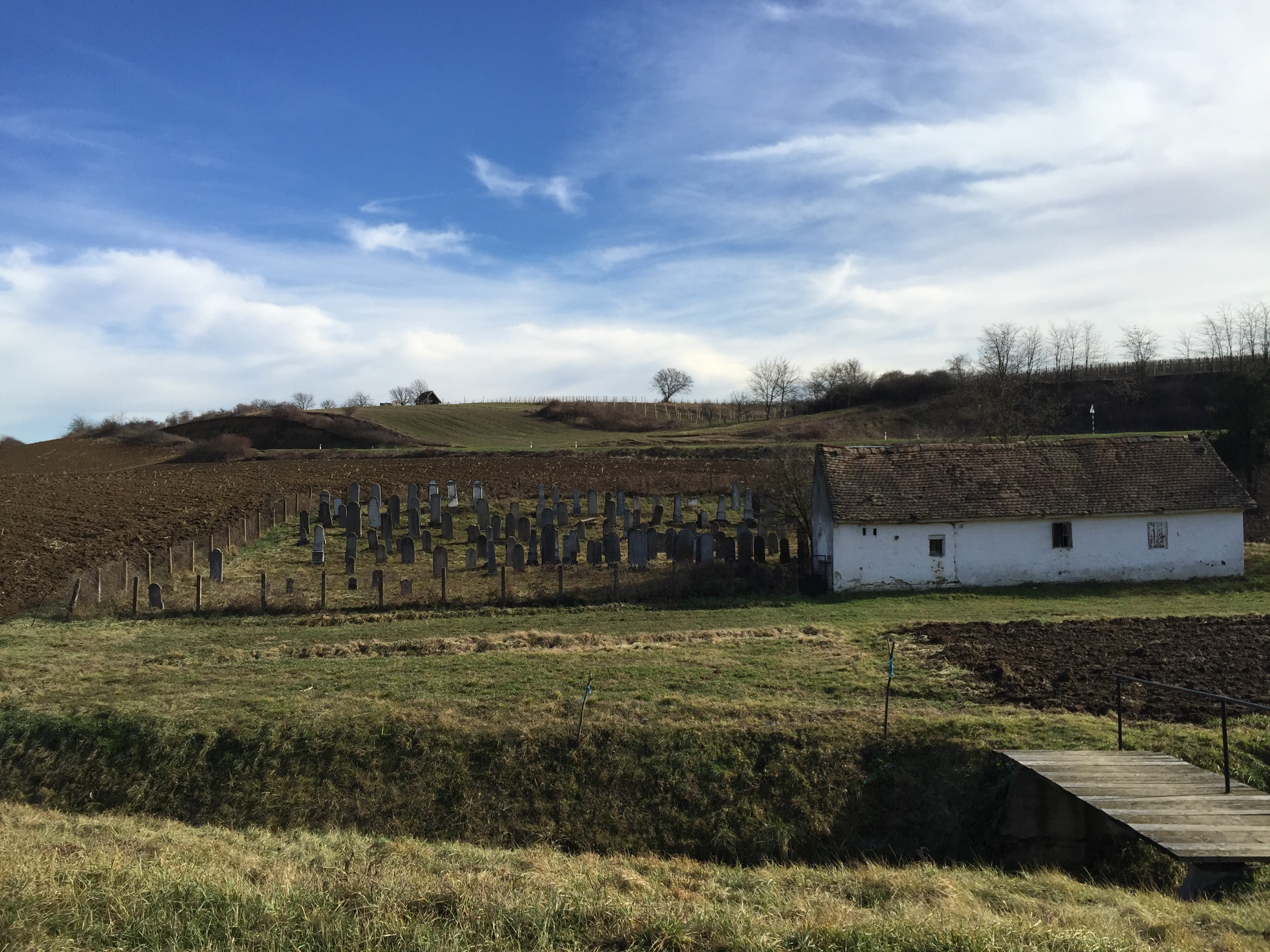
- Photographs of Ilok

- Flag Coat of arms
- Interactive map of Ilok
- Location of Ilok in Croatia Ilok (Croatia) Ilok (Europe)
- Coordinates: 45°13′19″N 19°22′31″E
- Country: Croatia
- Region: Slavonia (Syrmia, Podunavlje)
- County: Vukovar-Syrmia County

Government
  - Mayor: Renata Banožić (HDZ)

Area
  - Town: 129.0 km^{2} (49.8 sq mi)
  - Urban: 57.7 km^{2} (22.3 sq mi)
- Elevation: 110 m (360 ft)

Population (2021)
  - Town: 5,045
  - Density: 39.11/km^{2} (101.3/sq mi)
  - Urban: 3,842
  - Urban density: 66.6/km^{2} (172/sq mi)
- Demonym(s): Iločanin (♂) Iločanka (♀) (per grammatical gender)
- Time zone: UTC+1 (CET)
  - Summer (DST): UTC+2 (CEST)
- Postal code: 32236
- Area code: +385 (0)32
- Website: ilok.hr

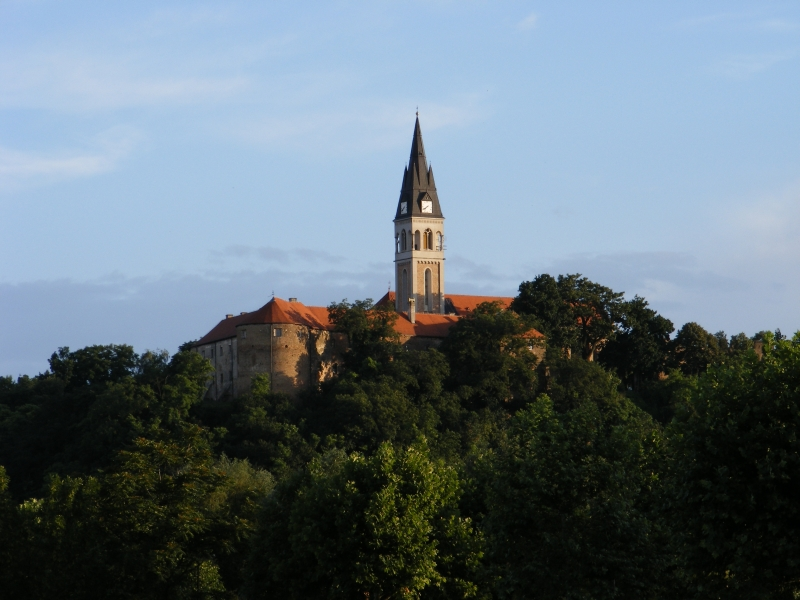
Ilok Castle

Ilok (pronounced [ǐlok]) is the easternmost town in Croatia.

== Geography ==
Ilok forms a geographic salient surrounded by Vojvodina, Serbia. Located in the Syrmia region, it lies on the Fruška Gora hill overlooking the Danube river, which forms the border with the Bačka region of Serbia.

== Landmarks ==
The town is home to a Franciscan monastery and Ilok Castle, which is a popular day trip for domestic and cross-border tourists.

== Name ==
In Croatian, the town is known as Ilok, in German as Illok, in Hungarian as Újlak, in Serbian Cyrillic as Илок and in Turkish as Uyluk. In Hungarian, Újlak means 'new dwelling' or 'new lodge'.

== History ==
The area of present-day Ilok was populated since the Neolithic and Bronze Age. One Scordisci archaeological site dating back to late La Tène culture was excavated in the 1970s and 1980s as a part of rescue excavations in eastern Croatia. The Romans settled there in the 1st or 2nd century and built Cuccium, the first border fortification on the Danube. The Slavs settled here in the 6th century. The area was later ruled by the Bulgarian Empire, with a period of Frankish and Croat rule under Ljudevit Posavski, but after that the Bulgarians return, and stayed there until it was included into the medieval Kingdom of Hungary.

In 12th and 13th centuries the market-town of Ilok was mentioned in documents under various names (Iwnlak, Vilak, Vylok, Wyhok, Wylak). At the end of the 13th century, Hungarian kings gave the Vylak castrum to the powerful Csák noble family. In the 13th and 14th centuries, Ilok was a capital of the semi-independent medieval state of Upper Syrmia ruled by Ugrin Csák.

After 1354, the town of Ilok belonged to Nicholas and Paul Garay (in Croatian references Gorjanski), and then to Nicholas Kont of Orahovica and his descendants, among which was his grandson Ladislaus, great-grandson Nicholas and the last member of the Újlaki (Iločki) family - Lawrence. Nicholas was the Ban of All Slavonia from 1457 to 1463, and his son, Lawrence was a duke of Syrmia from 1477 to 1524.

In 1526, the town came under Ottoman rule. During this time, it was mainly populated by Muslims. In 1566–69, Ilok had 238 Muslim and 27 Christian houses. In 1572, it had 386 Muslim, and 18 Christian houses. In 1669, the population of Ilok numbered 1,160 houses, and town possessed two mosques. It was kaza centre in Sanjak of Syrmia. Habsburg army firstly occupied Ilok in 1688, but Ottomans recaptured it in 1690. In 1697, Habsburg army definitively retook Ilok from the Ottomans and the Muslim population fled. Following Ottoman retreat from the region, the Lordship of Ilok and Upper Syrmia was established, and the town became seat of its domains.

During the Habsburg rule, Ilok belonged to the Kingdom of Slavonia, a Habsburg province that belonged to both the Kingdom of Croatia, and the Kingdom of Hungary. Between 1849 and 1868, the Kingdom of Slavonia was completely separate Habsburg crownland, and in 1868 it was joined with the Kingdom of Croatia to form the Kingdom of Croatia-Slavonia. In the late 19th and early 20th century, Ilok was a district capital in the Syrmia County of the Kingdom of Croatia-Slavonia.

In 1918, Ilok first became part of the State of Slovenes, Croats and Serbs, and then part of the Kingdom of Serbs, Croats and Slovenes (in 1929 renamed Kingdom of Yugoslavia). From 1929 to 1939, Ilok was part of the Danube Banovina and, from 1939 to 1941, of the Banovina of Croatia within the Kingdom of Yugoslavia. Between 1941 and 1944, during the Axis occupation of Yugoslavia, it belonged to the Independent State of Croatia. From 1945 onward, it was part of the People's Republic of Croatia within Socialist Yugoslavia.

On 17 October 1991 during the beginning of the Croatian War of Independence, non-Serbs fled as the Yugoslav People's Army led by Serb paramilitaries occupied the area, but spared it from destruction due to its rapid surrounding and occupation. Between 1991 and 1995, Ilok was part of the Republic of Serb Krajina. The area was peacefully reintegrated into Croatia in 1998.

Ilok is underdeveloped municipality which is statistically classified as the First Category Area of Special State Concern by the Government of Croatia.

== Climate ==
Since records began in 1981, the highest temperature recorded at the local weather station was 41.0 °C (105.8 °F), on 24 July 2017. The coldest temperature was −22.5 °C (−8.5 °F), on 9 February 2012.

== Demographics ==
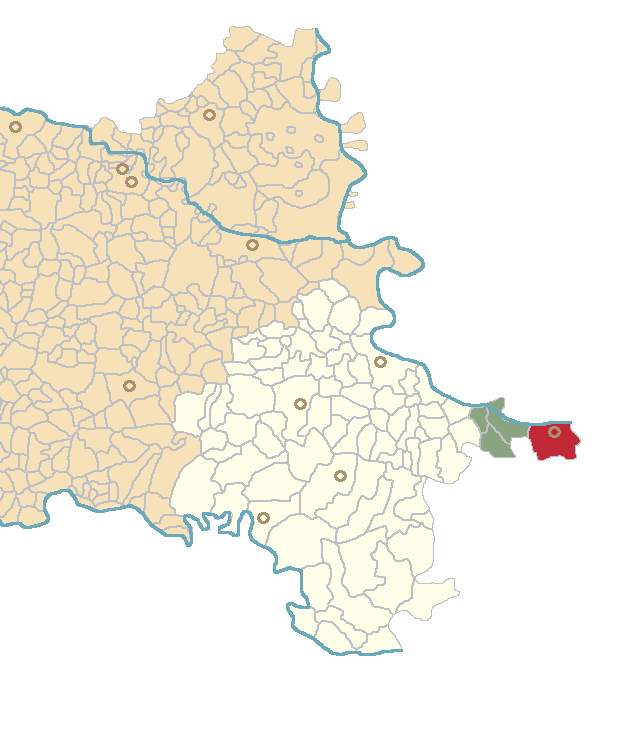
The Ilok municipality includes the settlements of Ilok (marked red) and Bapska, Mohovo and Šarengrad (marked green) on this map of settlements of eastern Slavonia.

According to the 2021 census, the town proper had 3,928 inhabitants, and the whole municipality of Ilok had 5,147. Before the 2001 census, the town was considered part of the old municipality of Vukovar. With pronounced issue of population decline in eastern Croatia caused by population ageing, effects of the Croatian War of Independence and emigration after the accession of Croatia to the European Union, the population of the town and three suburban settlements at the time of 2021 census dropped to 5,045 from 2011 population of 6,767.

Town of Ilok: Population trends 1857–2021
v

| population | 5954 | 7040 | 6547 | 7699 | 7865 | 8451 | 9130 | 9458 | 8839 | 9280 | 10049 | 10449 | 9891 | 9748 | 8351 | 6767 | 5045 |
| | 1857 | 1869 | 1880 | 1890 | 1900 | 1910 | 1921 | 1931 | 1948 | 1953 | 1961 | 1971 | 1981 | 1991 | 2001 | 2011 | 2021 |

Sources: Croatian Bureau of Statistics publications

| Population by settlements | 1991 | 2001 | 2011 | 2021 |
|---|---|---|---|---|
| Bapska | 1,624 | 1,313 | 928 | 658 |
| Ilok | 6,775 | 5,897 | 5,072 | 3,842 |
| Mohovo | 344 | 303 | 239 | 183 |
| Šarengrad | 1,005 | 838 | 528 | 362 |
| Total | 9,748 | 8,351 | 6,767 | 5,045 |

| Population by ethnicity | 1991 | 2001 | 2011 | 2021 |
|---|---|---|---|---|
| Croats | 6,848 (70.25%) | 6,425 (76.94%) | 5,189 (76.68%) | 3,961 (78.51%) |
| Slovaks | 1,192 (12.22%) | 1,044 (12.50%) | 935 (13.82%) | 674 (13.36%) |
| Serbs | 680 (6.97%) | 566 (6.78%) | 439 (6.49%) | 271 (5.37%) |
| Hungarians | 115 (1.17%) | 98 (1.17%) | 78 (1.15%) | 46 (0.91%) |
| others | 913 (9.36%) | 218 (2.61%) | 126 (1.86%) | 9 (0.18%) |
| Total | 9,748 | 8,351 | 6,767 | 5,045 |

=== 2011 census ===
Municipality of Ilok
Population by ethnicity
total: 6,767
1. Croats 5,189 (76.7%)
2. Slovaks 935 (13.8%)
3. Serbs 439 (6.49%)
4. Hungarians 78 (1.15%)
5. Rusyns 19 (0.28%)
6. Macedonians 14 (0.21%)
7. Germans 12 (0.18%)
8. Albanians 10 (0.15%)
9. Montenegrins 3 (0.04%)
10. Bosniaks 2 (0.03%)
11. Slovenes 2 (0.03%)
12. Czechs 1 (0.01%)
13. Roma 1 (0.01%)
14. declared religion 5 (0.07%)
15. regional affiliation 1 (0.01%)
16. others 5 (0.07%)
17. nondeclared 36 (0.53%)
18. not classified 2 (0.03%)
19. unknown 13 (0.19%)

=== Ilok (settlement) ===
Settlement of Ilok: Population trends 1857–2021
v

| population | 3110 | 3776 | 3489 | 4288 | 4387 | 4856 | 5475 | 5809 | 5361 | 5696 | 6193 | 6683 | 6700 | 6775 | 5897 | 5072 | 3842 |
| | 1857 | 1869 | 1880 | 1890 | 1900 | 1910 | 1921 | 1931 | 1948 | 1953 | 1961 | 1971 | 1981 | 1991 | 2001 | 2011 | 2021 |

Sources: Croatian Bureau of Statistics publications

==== 1991 census ====
Ilok
Population by ethnicity
total: 6,775
1. Croats 4,248 (62.7%)
2. Slovaks 1,157 (17.1%)
3. Serbs 484 (7.14%)
4. Yugoslavs 474 (6.99%)
5. Hungarians 105 (1.54%)
6. Rusyns 28 (0.41%)
7. Albanians 10 (0.14%)
8. Muslims 10 (0.14%)
9. Macedonians 9 (0.13%)
10. Montenegrins 8 (0.11%)
11. Germans 5 (0.07%)
12. Czechs 2 (0.02%)
13. Slovenes 2 (0.02%)
14. Ukrainians 1 (0.01%)
15. others 2 (0.02%)
16. nondeclared 145 (2.14%)
17. regionaly declared 7 (0.10%)
18. unknown 78 (1.15%)

==== 1910 census ====
According to the 1910 census, settlement of Ilok had 4,856 inhabitants (in the main settlement Ilok 4,809 and in hamlet of Principovac 47), which were linguistically and religiously declared as this:

Ilok
| Population by language | Population by religion |
| total: 4,856: 1. Croatian 2,729 (56.2%); 2. Slovak 840 (17.3%); 3. German 571 (11.8%); 4. Serbian 448 (9.22%); 5. Hungarian 254 (5.23%); 6. Czech 7 (0.14%); 7. Rusyn 5 (0.10%); 8. Slovene 1 (0.02%); 9. others 1 (0.02%) | total: 4,856: 1. Rom. Cath. 3,325 (68.5%); 2. Lutherans 646 (13.3%); 3. East. Orthodox 450 (9.26%); 4. Jewish 213 (4.38%); 5. Calvinists 204 (4.20%); 6. East. Catholics 16 (0.32%); 7. others 2 (0.04%) |

=== Slovaks in Ilok ===
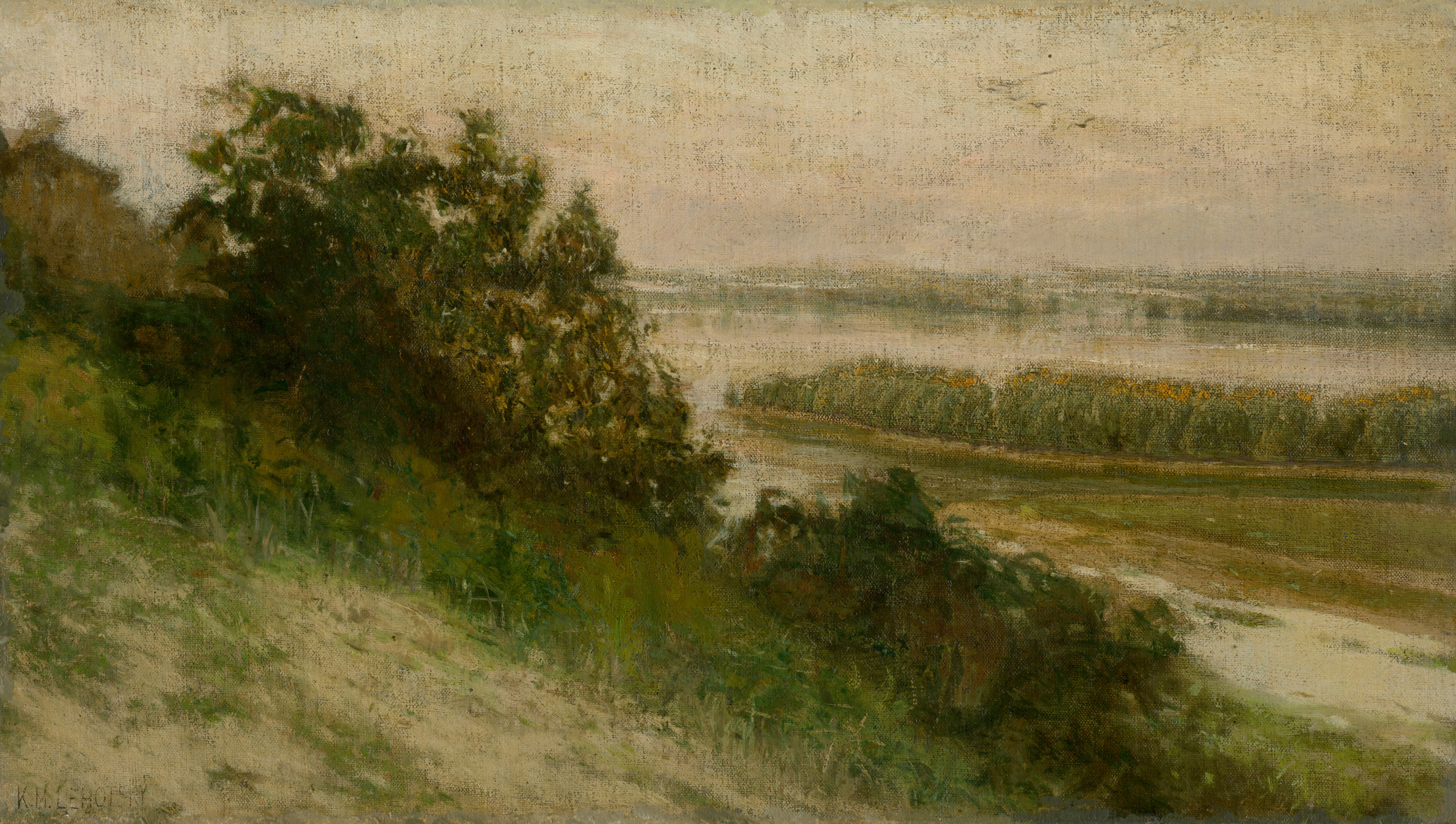
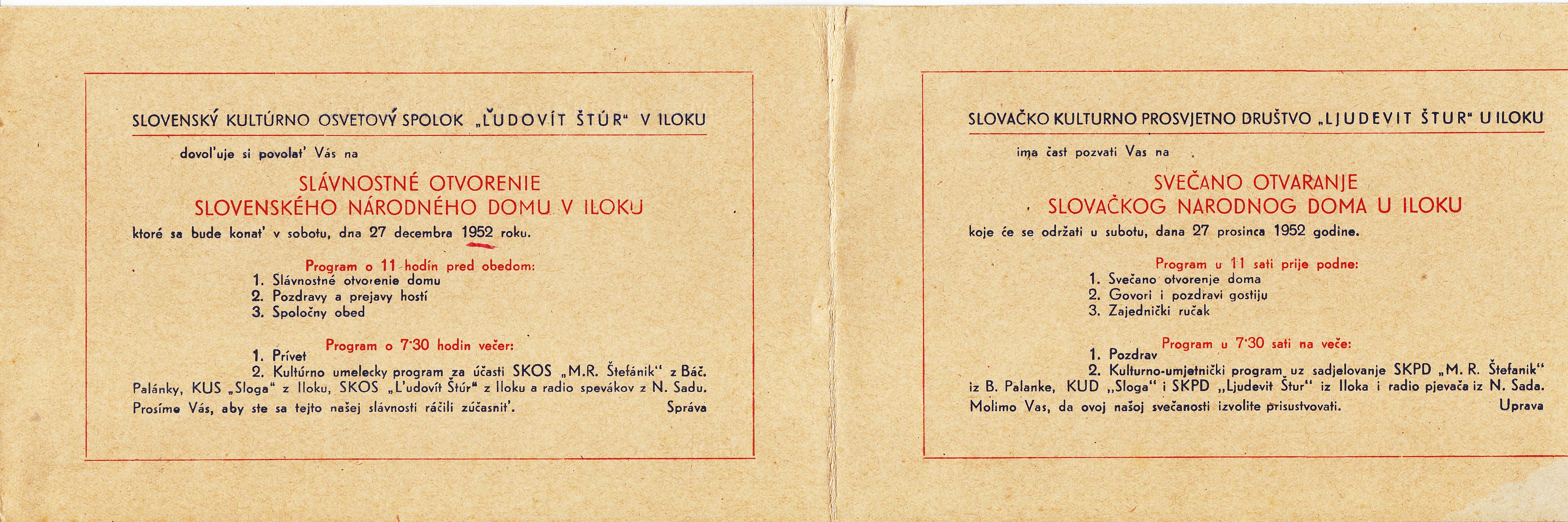
1) Nightingale Isle by Ilok by Slovak painter Karol Miloslav Lehotský
2) 1952 invitation to the opening of the Slovak House, Museum of Vojvodina Slovaks

Ilok is one of the centres of the cultural life of the Slovaks of Croatia community. Ilok Slovak community is closely linked with Slovaks in Serbia where there are Slovak communities and Slovak majority villages just across the border and with Slovak language being one of the official languages in Vojvodina.

Once Evangelical Slovaks were granted the right to settle and buy property in the Kingdom of Slavonia in 1859 Slovak settlers across the Danube river in Bačka started to move to Syrmia. Slovak Evangelical Church of the Augsburg Confession established the local parish in Ilok in 1864 with building serving a place of worship, a school and a teacher's apartment. The Slovak Evangelical school, which existed until 1896, was at the time was one of four confessional schools in the town alongside Croat Catholic, Serb Orthodox and the Jewish Israelite school. State sponsored school education in Ilok was reinitiated in 1922 after the establishment of the Kingdom of Serbs, Croats and Slovenes and the public Slovak school will continue its work until 1957. The first Slovak cultural association was established by students of the local gymnasium in 1925 which in the same year joined the Association of Czechoslovak Academicians in Yugoslavia. The Slovak Reading Society was established in 1928 which preserved that name until 1951 when it changed the name into contemporary name the Slovak Cultural and Educational Association Ľudovít Štúr.

Slovak branch of the national Union of Czechs and Slovaks was established in Ilok in 1981 with Slovak cultural life continuing even during the Croatian War of Independence. Following the completion of the United Nations Transitional Administration for Eastern Slavonia, Baranja and Western Sirmium Slovak Cultural and Educational Association Ľudovít Štúr joined the Union of Slovaks in Croatia while local Matica slovenská was established on 18 December 1997. In that period Slovak community used the right to organize Slovak language education for the first four grades until 2002/2003 school year after which only elective Slovak classes were offered. In 2014 local community commemorated 140 years of the existence of the Evangelical-Slovak Church in Ilok.

== Politics ==
=== Minority councils and representatives ===
Directly elected minority councils and representatives are tasked with consulting tasks for the local or regional authorities in which they are advocating for minority rights and interests, integration into public life and participation in the management of local affairs. At the 2023 Croatian national minorities councils and representatives elections Slovaks and Serbs of Croatia each fulfilled legal requirements to elect 15 members minority councils of the Town of Ilok.

== Gallery ==
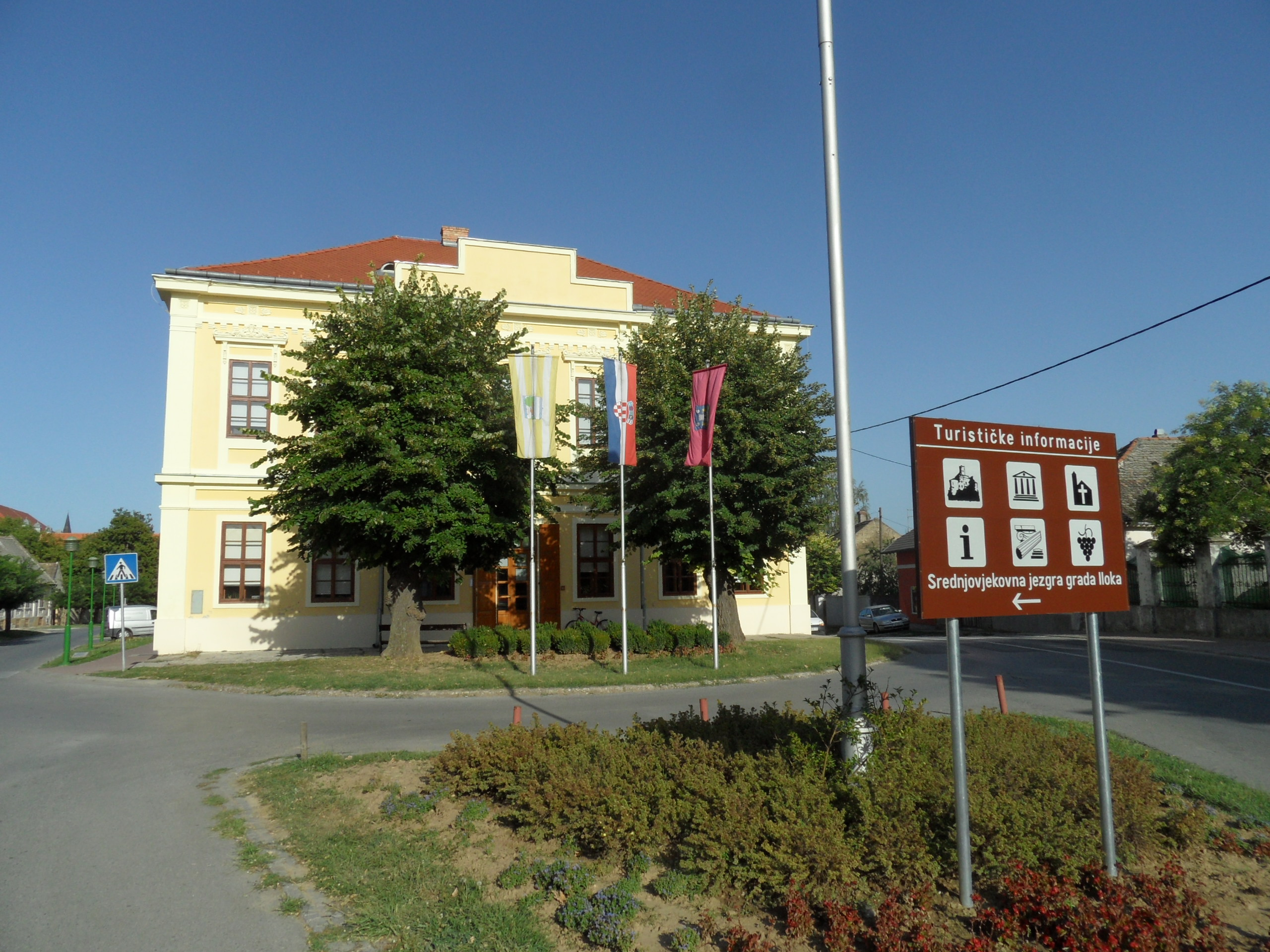
Ilok library

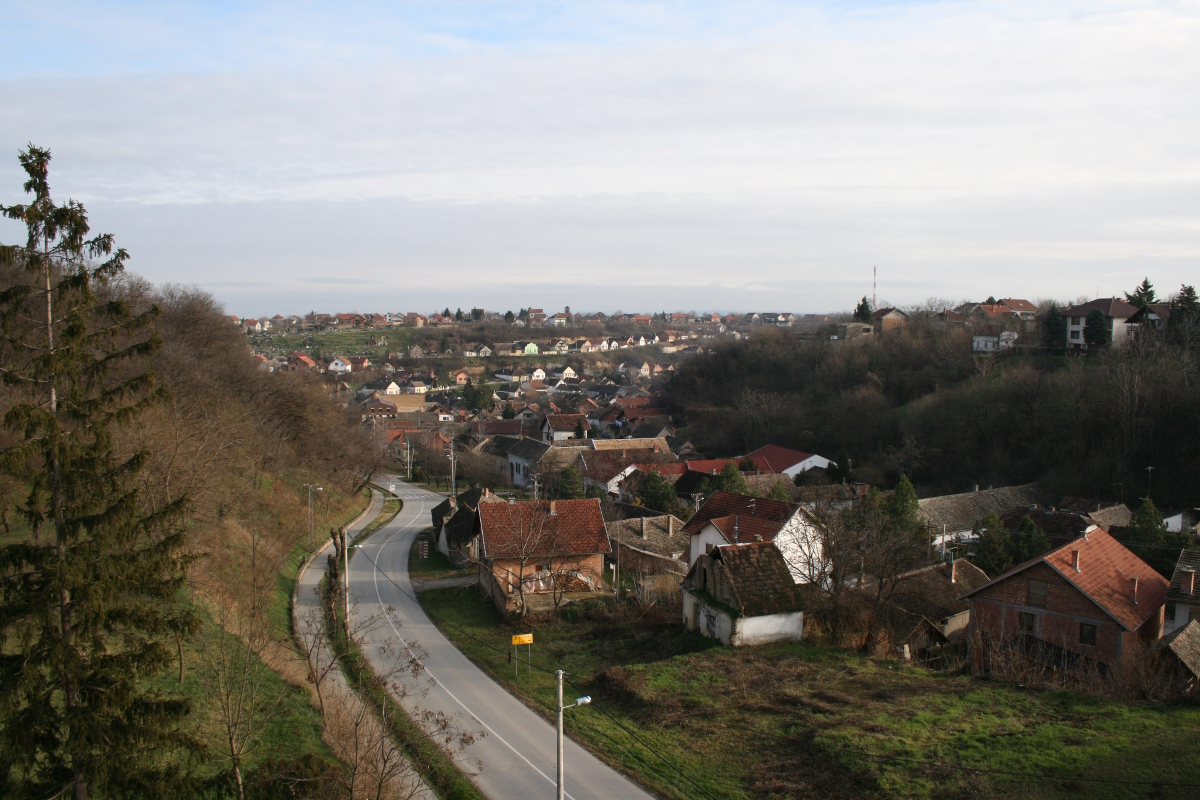
View at the town from the castle

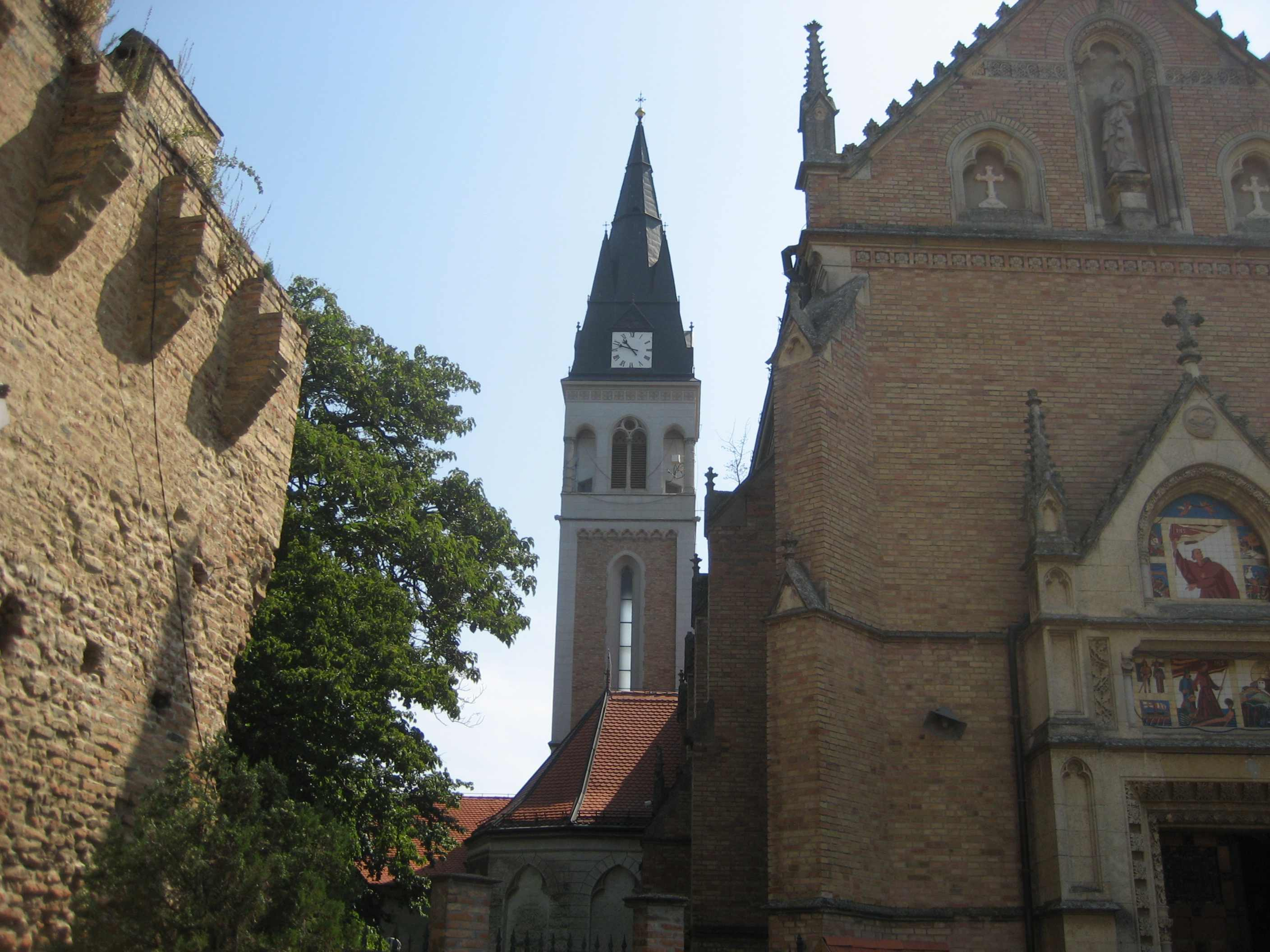
Catholic church of Saint John of Capistrano

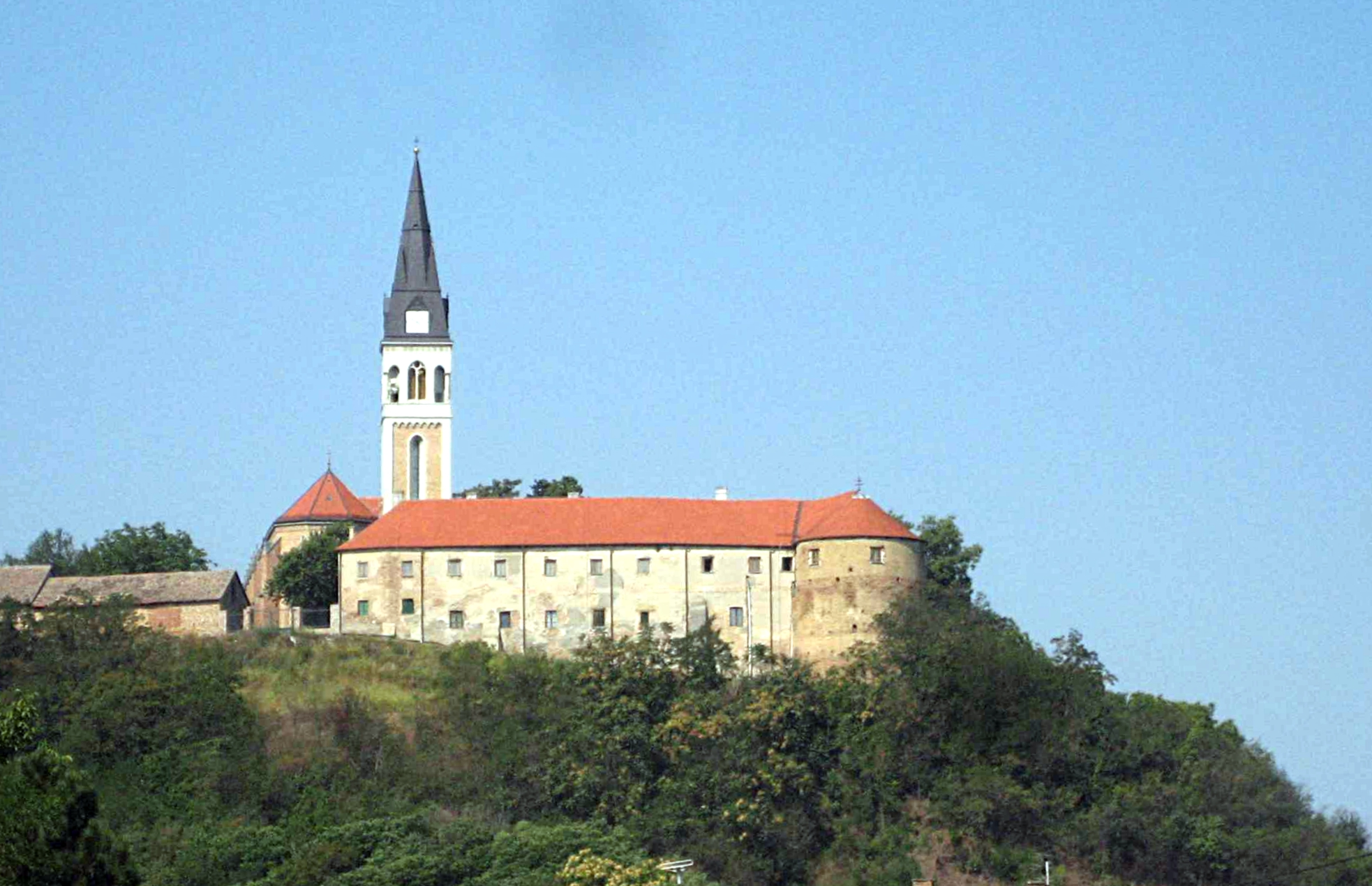
View at the church and Franciscan monastery

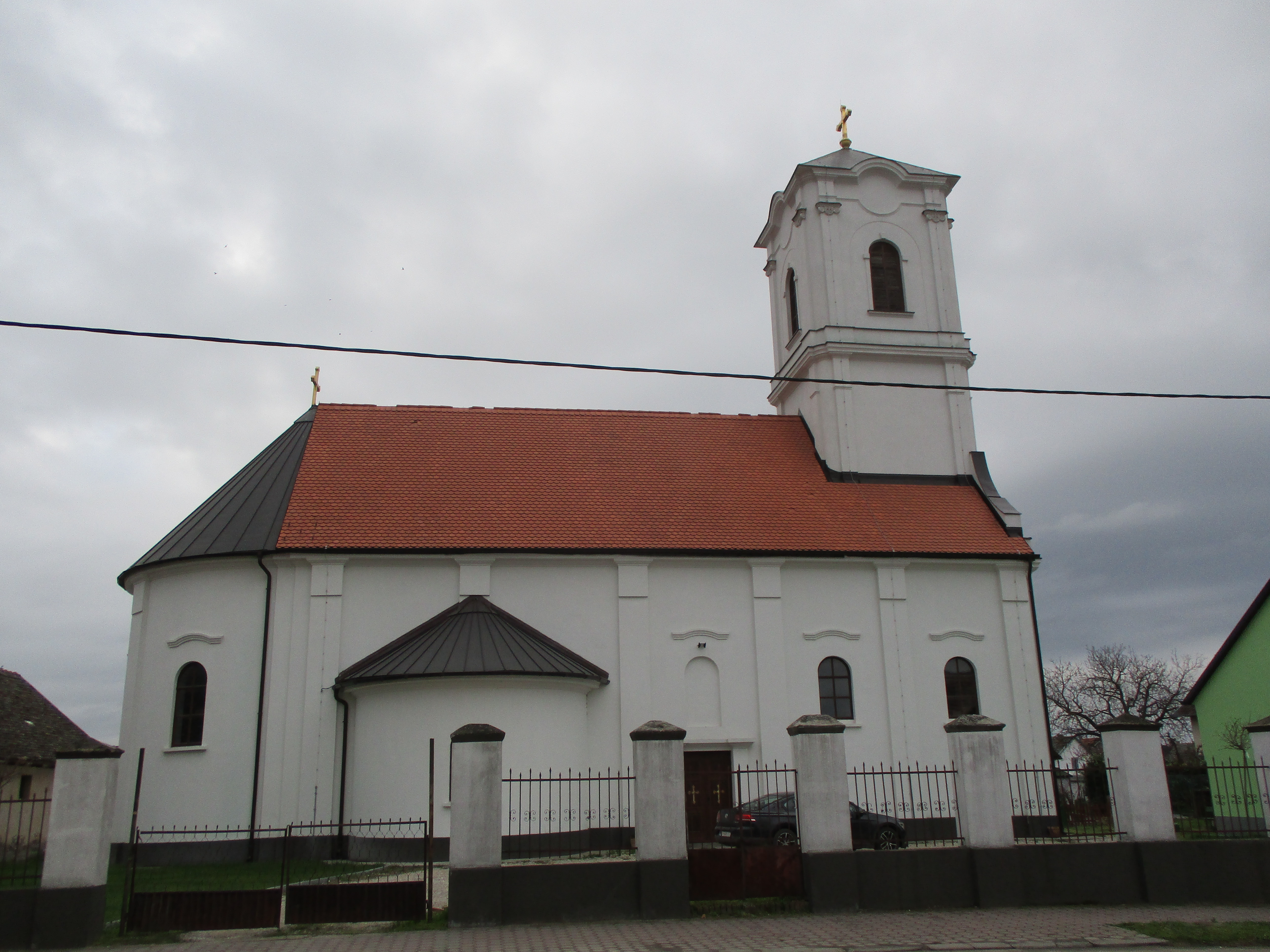
Serbian Orthodox Church of St. Michael the Archangel

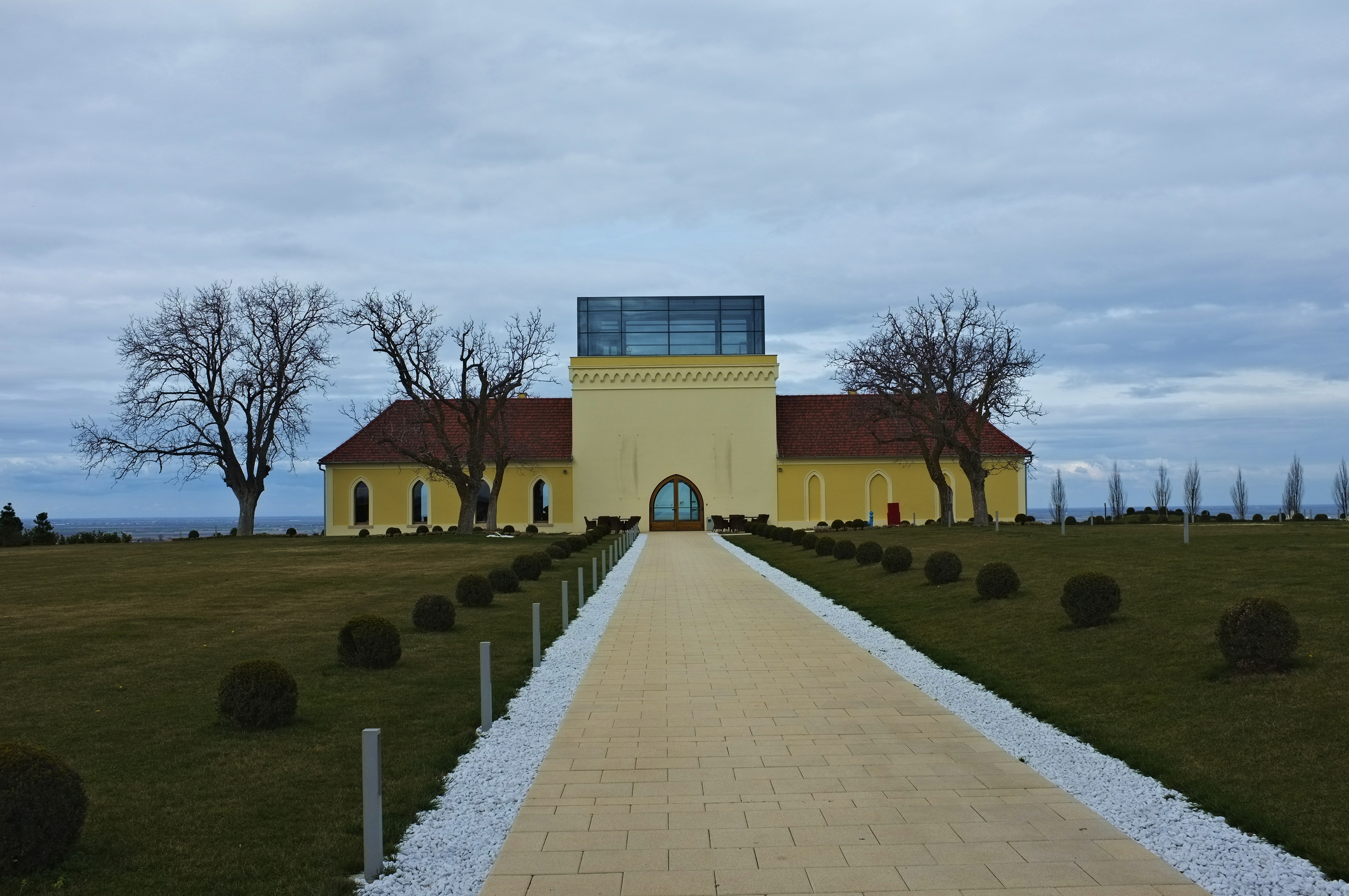
Principovac estate

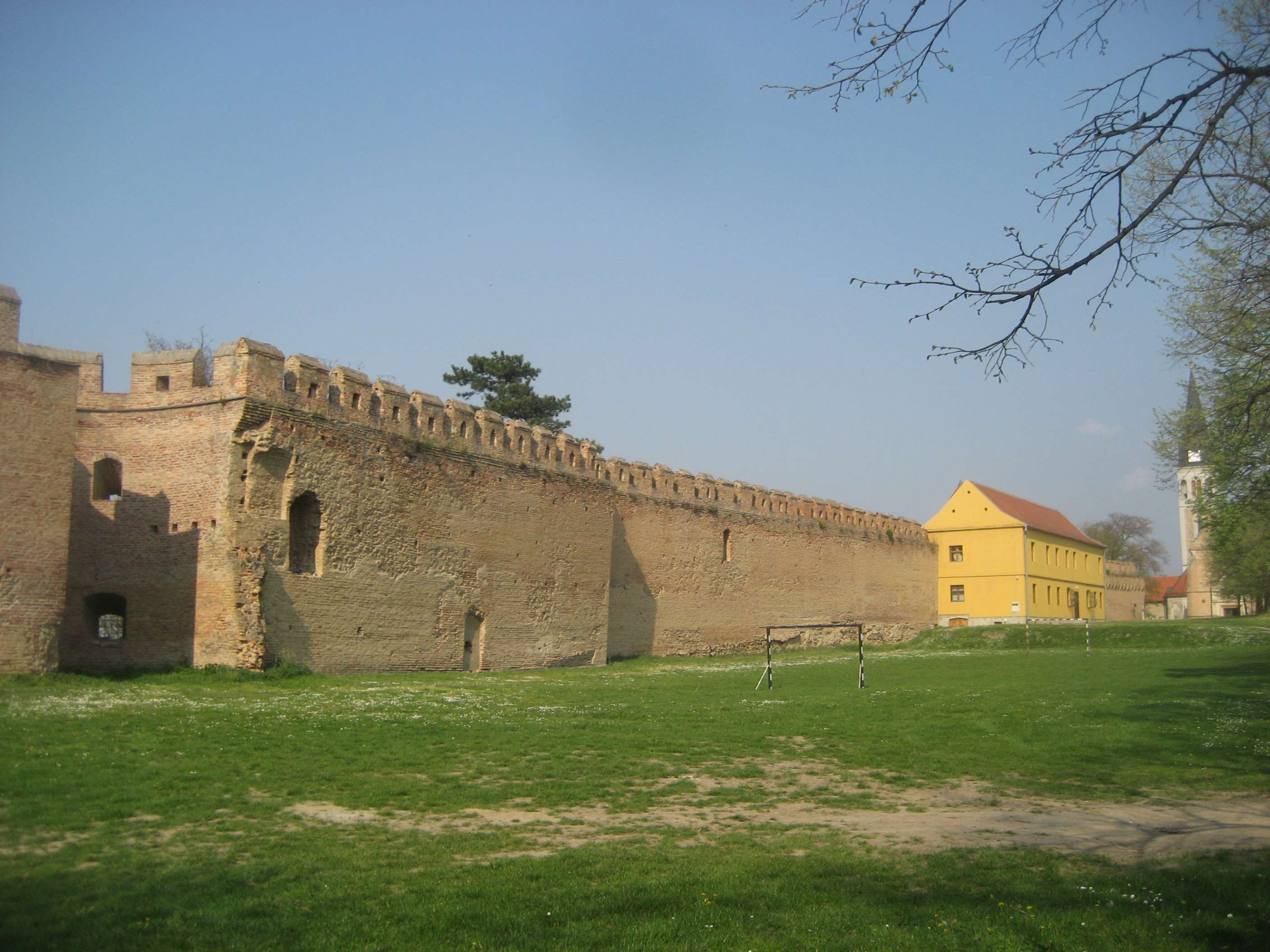
Walls of the castle

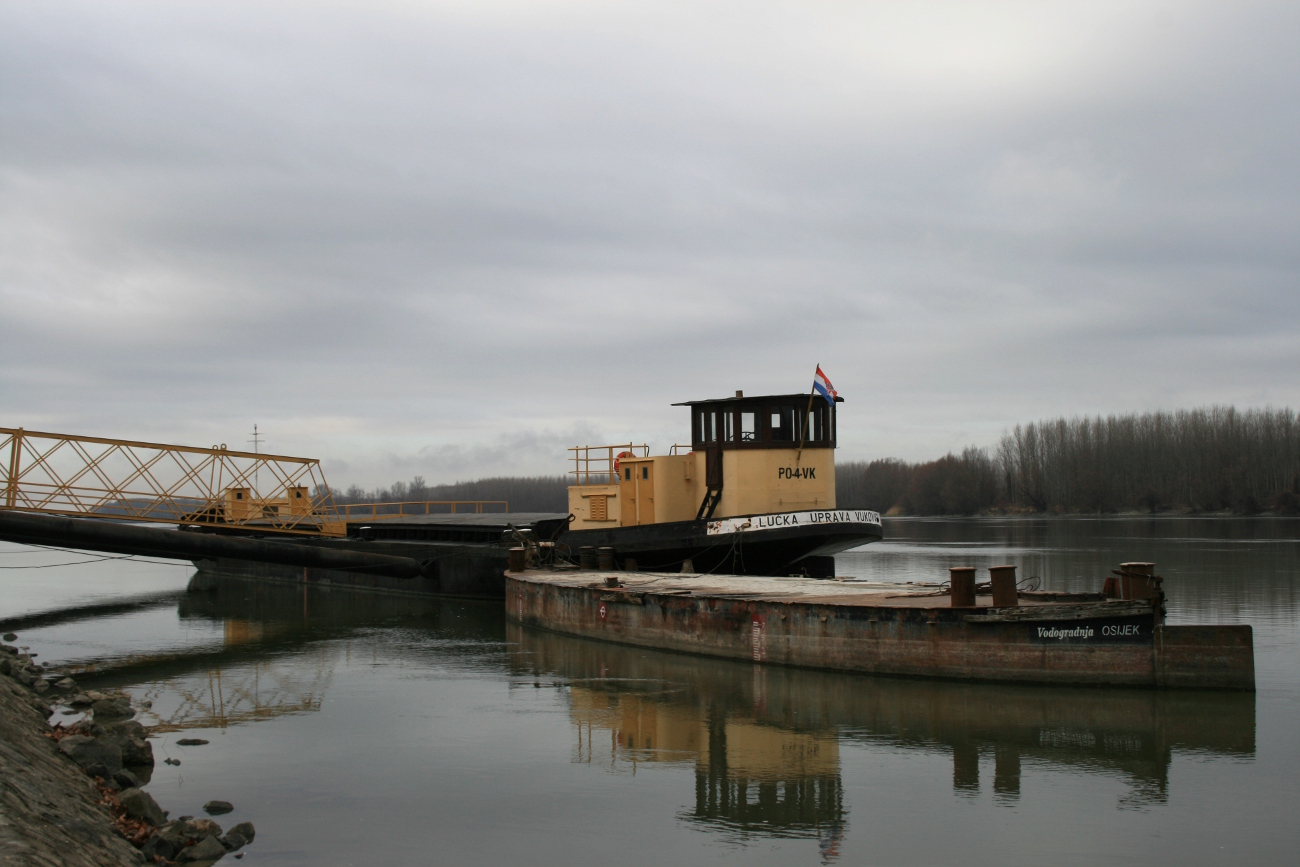
Danube river ferry

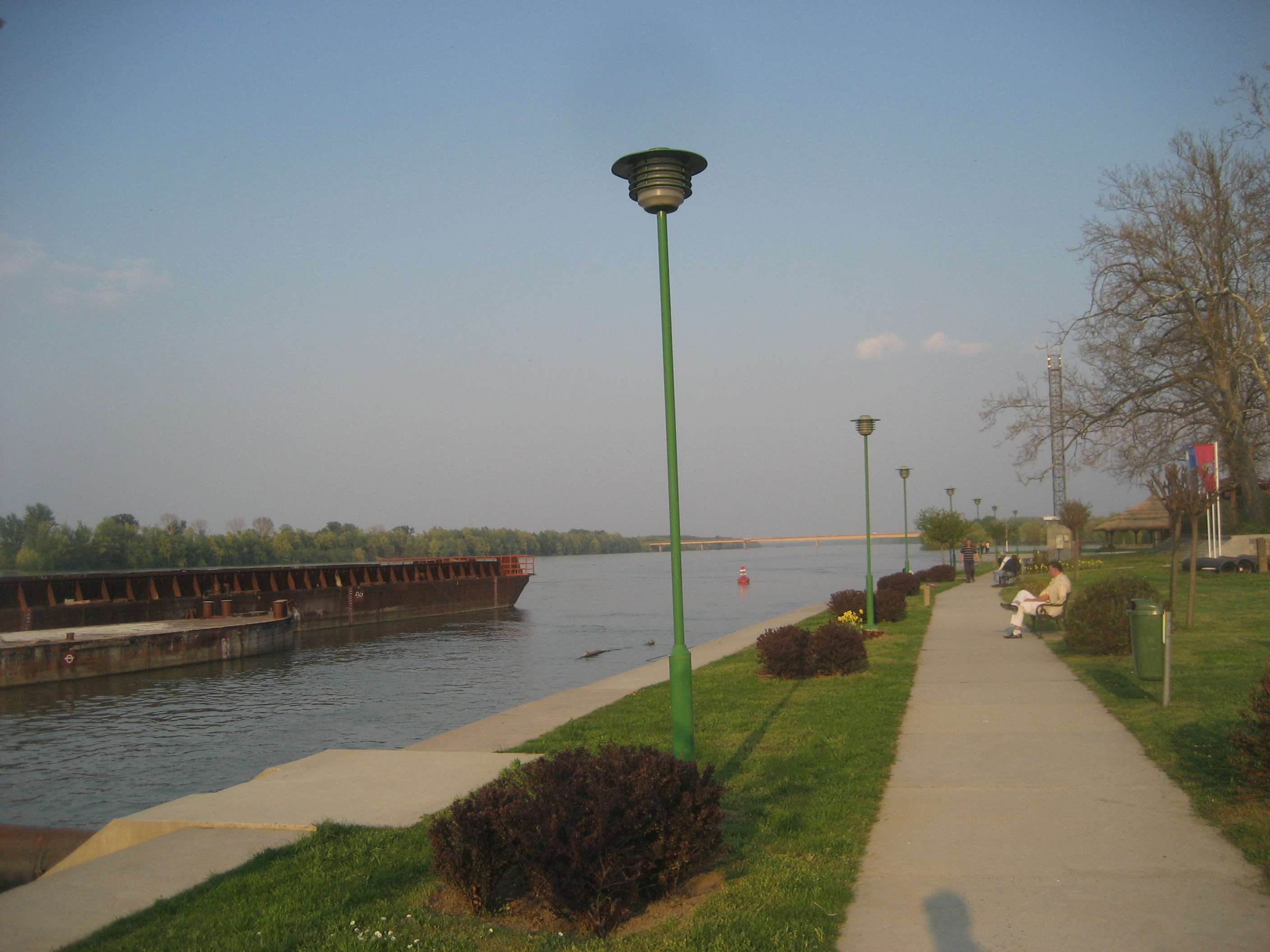
Riverside promenade

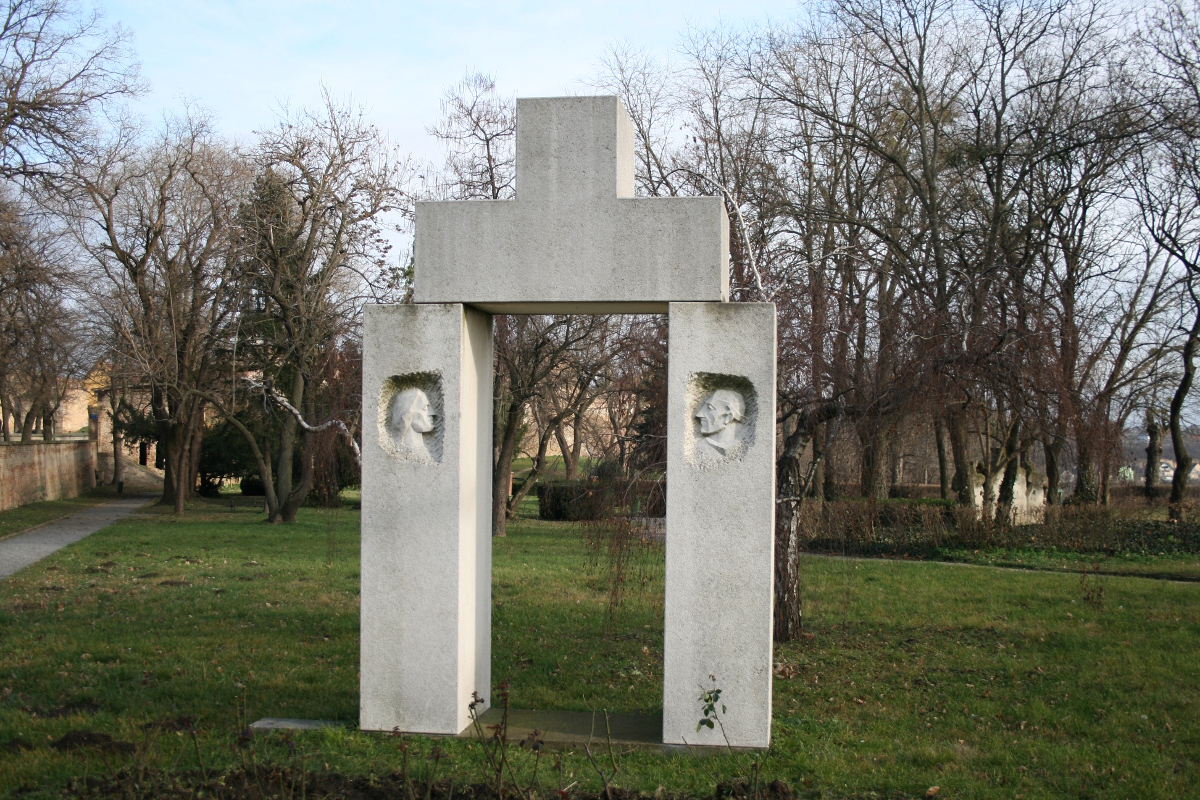
Memorial

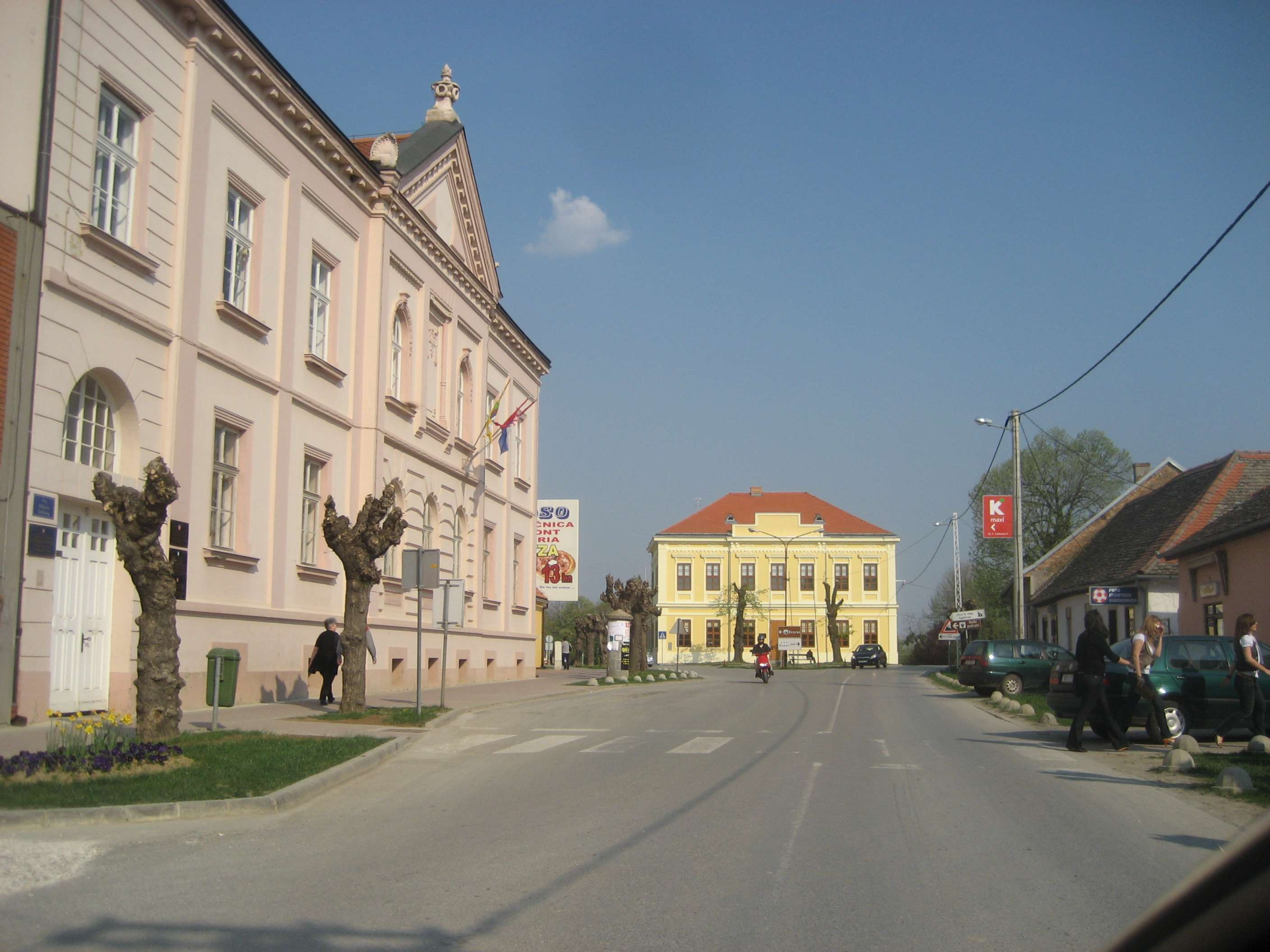
Ilok centre with town hall at the left and library in the middle
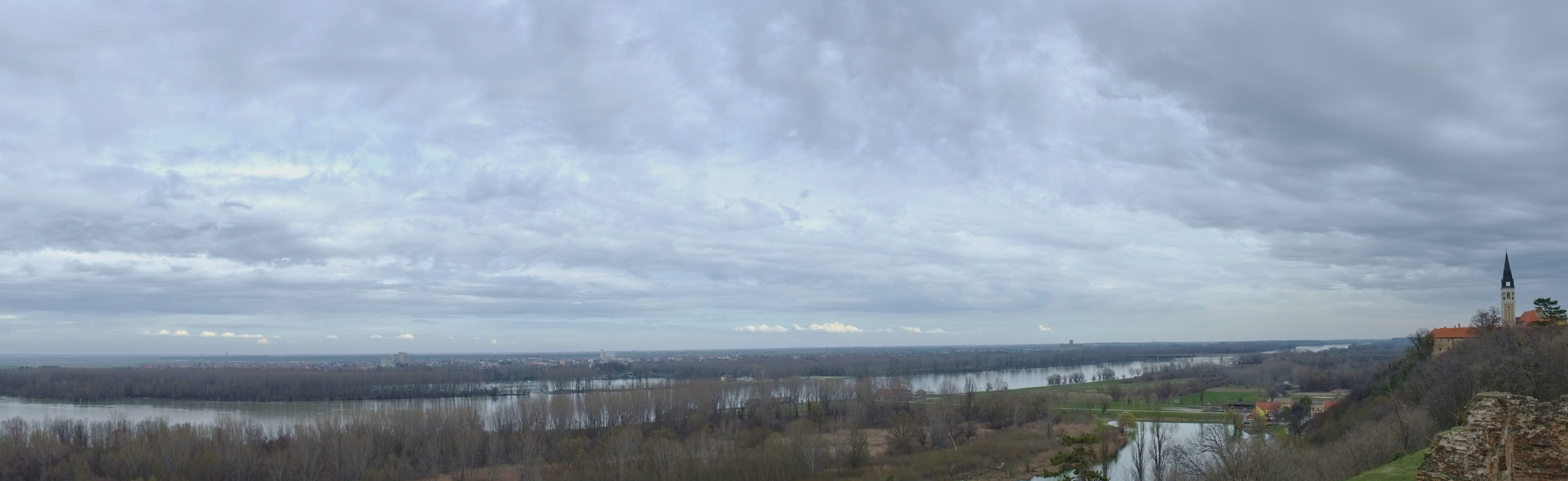
Panoramic view of the Danube in Ilok with the Serbian town of Bačka Palanka on the other side of the river.

== Notable people ==
- Petar Jovanović

== See also ==
- Church of St. Michael the Archangel, Ilok
