= Kórógyi family =

Hungarian noble family (13th century to 1470s)

House of Kórógyi comes in Castel et dominus in Korogd
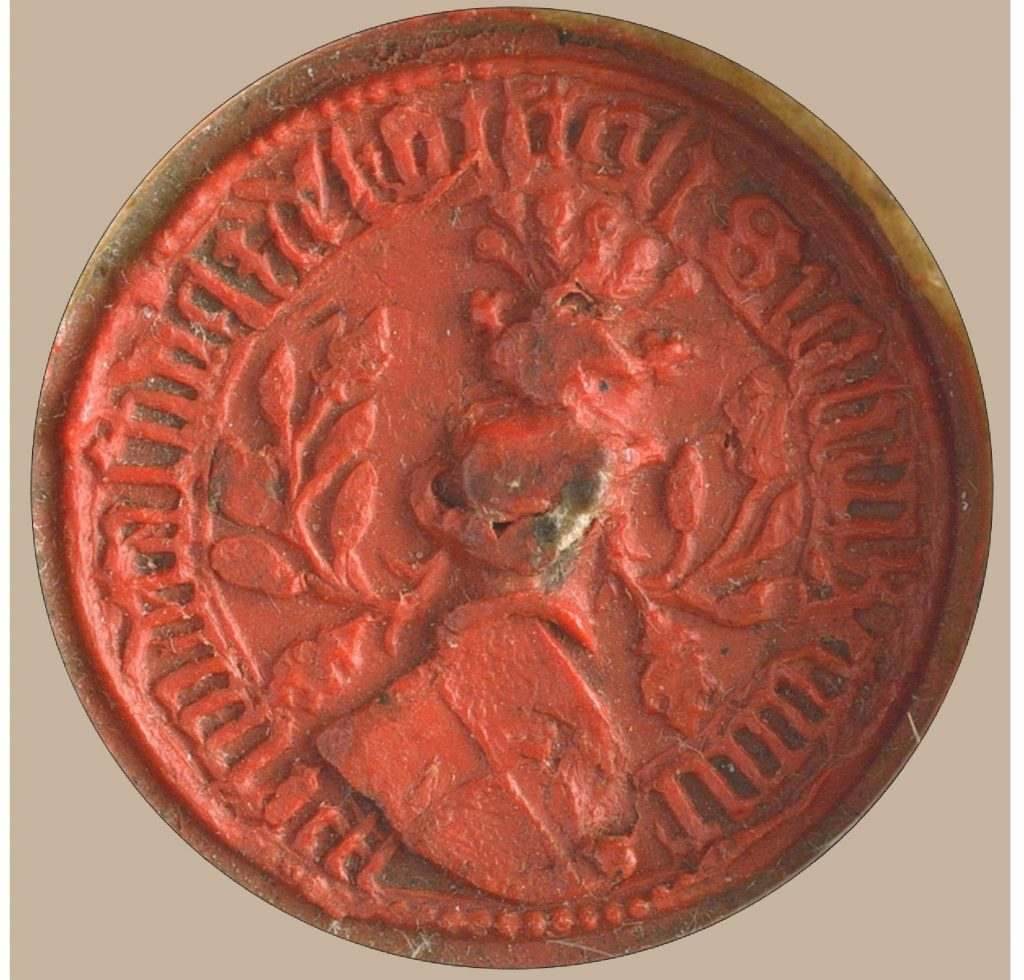
- Country: Kingdom of Hungary; Kingdom of Croatia
- Founded: 1150s–1160s (?)
- Founder: Geoffrey (?)
- Final ruler: Caspar
- Titles: Lord of Kórógy; Count of Castell (since 1417)
- Estates: Kórógyvar (ancient seat, near today's Ivanovac); Osijek (permanent residence since the mid-14th century) etc.
- Dissolution: 1472
- Cadet branches: House of Szeglaki (Kosi)

The Kórógyi (in Hungarian; Croatian: Korođski), initially also known as Csapai, was a medieval noble family in the Kingdom of Hungary from the early 13th century to the 1470s, which possessed estates in southern Transdanubia and northern Slavonia, primarily around the city of Osijek. The family reached its peak in the last decades of the 14th century, when several members held important functions in the royal court. Since the early 15th century, the family played a key role in defending the kingdom's southern border against the Ottoman Empire.

The Kórógyis were the first family of Hungarian origins to use the title of count in the Kingdom of Hungary. They became extinct in 1472.

== Name ==
The kinship is first referred with the suffix "de Chapa" (i.e. Csapai) in 1256, which suggests that before the construction of the Kórógy Castle (present-day ruins near Ovčara and Ivanovac, Croatia), their main residence was Csapa in Valkó County (present-day Čepin, Croatia). Since the 14th century, members of the family appear with the title "lord of Kórógy" (Latin: dominus de Korogh) in many variants: de Chorogh, de Korogh, de Koroug, de Korough. Thus the family is referred to as Kórógyi and Korođski in modern Hungarian and Croatian historiography, respectively. In early 20th century, amidst striving Croatisation, there was an attempt to refer the family as "od Kruga", "Kružić" or "Koroćski" in Croatian historiography, under the mistaken assumption that the name was derived from a Slavic root, which it was not. Instead, the Kórógyis were named after their fortification of Kórógyvar (located near the village of Korođ, but actually nearer to Ivanovac), so the valid Croatian forms may include Korođvarski, Kolođvarski and Korođgradski after the name of their stronghold.

== History ==
=== Origin ===
The kindred of the sons of Keled, that is, Stephen, Ladislas and Gregory, came from the province of Meissen. Stephen was the son of the sister of the margrave of Meissen and of Count Herfold. Having killed the landgrave of Thuringia in Frankfurt on the occasion of a solemn assembly where he and others were to elect an emperor, the German princes passed sentence against him that in return he also should be killed. So in the days of King Géza [II], son of Béla II, he came into Pannonia with sixty armed horses and was ceremoniously received by the said king, who bestowed upon him most rich and extensive lands, for it was known that he suffered the penalty of proscription in the territory of Meissen.

— Illuminated Chronicle

In the days of King Stephen III a knight called Geoffrey from the area of Meissen arrived in Hungary. He was the progenitor of the kindred of Philip, Ladislas, and Gregory, the sons of Keled. Geoffrey, who as son of the Count of Hersfeld was of noble birth, is said to have killed the landgrave of Thuringia in a revolt which broke out at the court in Frankfurt where the imperial elections were to take place. Thereupon Geoffrey fled and escaped to King Stephen's court. His enemies demanded the fugitive's extradition, and when the King refused to hand him over a sentence of banishment was issued against him in Germany. He then had no option but to remain in Hungary. At a later date the king sent him with an army against the Duke of Bosnia. Geoffrey returned victoriously, and he was thereafter treated with favour by the king.

— Simon of Kéza: Gesta Hunnorum et Hungarorum

Hungarian medieval chronicles preserved a contradictory and confused story about the origins of the Kórógyi family. The 14th-century Illuminated Chronicle says that the ancestor was a certain Keled (Cletus or Klet), who originated from the Margravate of Meissen. His offspring, Stephen, who was a son of a sister of the margrave and a certain Count Herfold, assassinated the landgrave of Thuringia during the imperial election in Frankfurt. To escape reprisals, he fled to Hungary with sixty armored knights, where King Géza II (r. 1141–1162) offered him refuge. It is possible that story is connected to the 1130 unsolved murder of Henry Raspe I, who was the brother of Louis I, Landgrave of Thuringia. Most historians remain skeptical about the authenticity of the story. Historian Elemér Mályusz considered that the story was a fabrication of the mid-13th-century chronicler Ákos, who is credited with recording the origins of influential Hungarian families in the text of the chronicle. The Kórógyi family did not adopt Ákos' narration, and it did not appear in the family tradition.

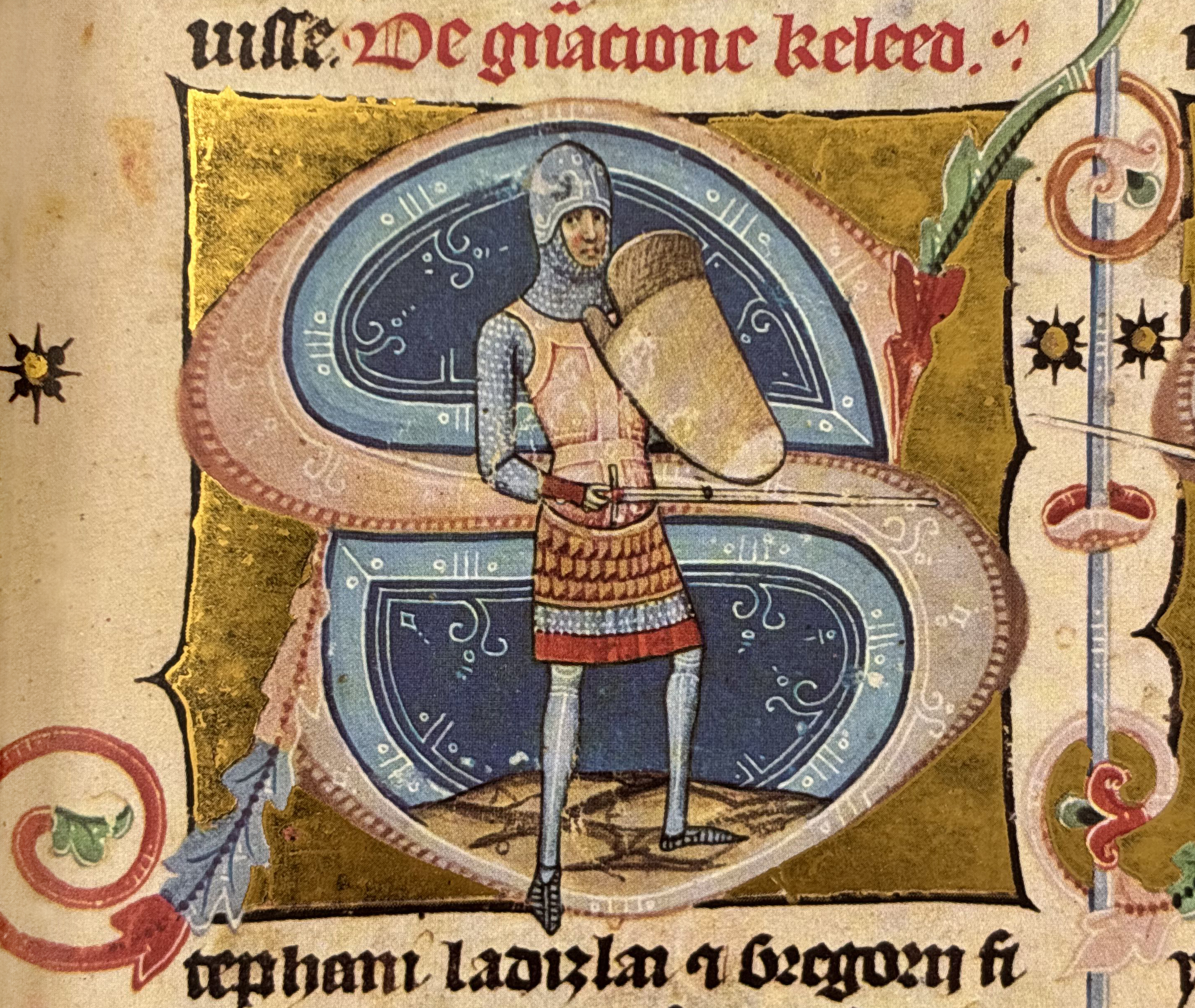
Knight Keled (Cletus), a hypothetical ancestor of the Kórógyis, depicted by the 14th-century Illuminated Chronicle

In his work Gesta Hunnorum et Hungarorum (1280s), the chronicler Simon of Kéza modified Ákos's narrative at several points; accordingly, the Kórógyis' ancestor was a knight Geoffrey (Gottfried) from Meissen, who fled to Hungary during the reign of King Stephen III (r. 1162–1172). He was the son of the Count of Hersfeld, and he allegedly killed the landgrave of Thuringia amidst an uprising that broke out during the election of the emperor in Frankfurt. Although his enemies demanded his extradition, Stephen refused this. Simon narrates that Geoffrey led a victorious royal campaign against Bosnia. This story is also highly doubtful. There is no trace of the existence of a Count of Hersfeld family, as the town was an abbey estate, while the sequence of events described did not take place. It is possible that both Ákos and Simon mixed the event with the murder of Philip of Swabia took place in 1208, after which some of the perpetrators (relatives of Andrew II's wife) fled to Hungary. It is also not known whether a campaign against Bosnia took place under Stephen III. It is possible that, instead of the Kórógyis, the Frankói family from western Transdanubia claimed Geoffrey of Hersfeld as their ancestor, and the two chroniclers mistakenly attributed the ancestor to the Kórógyis. Charters of Géza II and Stephen III from 1156 and 1171, respectively mention some imperial knights Gottfried (Geoffrey) and Albert as expatriates, who could thus in this sense be the ancestors of the Kórógyis (or rather the Frankóis), in line with the chronicle tradition.

Genealogist Mór Wertner tried to find the historical roots of the chronicle narrative; the Counts of Gudensberg were granted advocatus position over Hersfeld Abbey in the late 11th century. Following the death of Giso IV, Count of Gudensberg (1122), both Hersfeld and Gudensberg were escheated to Henry Raspe I, who married Giso's widow and thus he was the stepfather of the minor Giso V, Count of Gudensberg, the last male member of the lineage. Wertner claimed that the young knight Geoffrey, a member of the Hersfeld family, murdered Henry because of this inheritance. After his crime took place in 1130, he fled to Hungary, where King Stephen II granted him asylum. He spent the following decades in Hungary, where he was given estates along the southern border. As an adjacent lord, he was given command to lead the campaign against the Byzantine Empire to the territory of Bosnia in 1166, when Stephen III was embroiled into war with the powerful realm. Wertner claimed that Geoffrey had a son named Keled (Cletus), whose son Gregory looted the estates of Arad Chapter in 1223. For his act he was excommunicated. Therefore, Gregory went on a pilgrimage to Rome, where he made a deal with abbot Gottfried before the presence of Pope Honorius III. He possessed the estate Csebza in Temes County. Wertner claimed that this Gregory was the brother of Philip (I), who is the first known member of the Kórógyi family. Wertner's theory did not find its way into historical science.

The 16th-century Humanist scholar Miklós Istvánffy incorrectly claimed that the ancestor of the Kórógyis took part in the murder of Saint Gerard in 1046. Istvánffy's mistake persisted in Hungarian historiography for a very long time. This tradition, in fact, concerns another family with the same name.

=== 13th century ===
==== Early years ====
Philip (I), known only by name, lived in the second half of the 12th century. He had two sons, Philip (II), Cletus, and a daughter Chen, who were old enough to have adult children by 1241. Prior to the Mongol invasion, Philip (II) died without male descendants. King Béla IV donated his estates, including Orljavac in Požega County to his brother Cletus for the latter's faithful service in the royal court. With the king's consent, Cletus bequeathed half portion of Orljavac to his son-in-law Vincent Báncsa. After Philip's daughters filed a complaint, Cletus gave them the estate in exchange for compensating Vincent with 100 marks. During the Mongol invasion took place in 1241, Cletus and Philip's daughters were perished, while Cletus' adult sons – Ladislaus (I), Philip (III) and Gregory – belonged to the royal escort of Béla IV, who fled to the Dalmatian coast to escape the pursuing Mongols. After the withdrawal of the Mongols, the lawsuit over Orljavac was settled in October 1243; Cletus' widow, Macha and her sons – Ladislaus, Philip and Gregory – declared before the cathedral chapter of Pécs that they would give up their share of the property (half portion of Orljavac) in favor of Vincent in exchange for 100 marks, and that they were ready to sell the other half to him for 60 marks. The Hungarian monarch approved the transaction in March 1244.

Béla IV confirmed all donations that he made in favor of the late Cletus to his sons in 1256, since the previous royal charters were destroyed during the Mongol invasion. For their faithful service, especially during the Mongol invasion, Ladislaus, Philip and Gregory were granted the lands Kos, Dubrava (Dombró) and Csapa in Valkó County (present-day Čepin, Croatia) by Béla IV in August 1258. These possessions were removed from the jurisdiction of the castle of Vukovar with this act. The three brothers paid the daughters' quarter to their aunt Chen in exchange for her land Szentiván (present-day a borough of Čepinski Martinci) in 1259. By that time, Chen was a widow, her late husband Peter Apor died prior to that.

==== First acquisitions ====
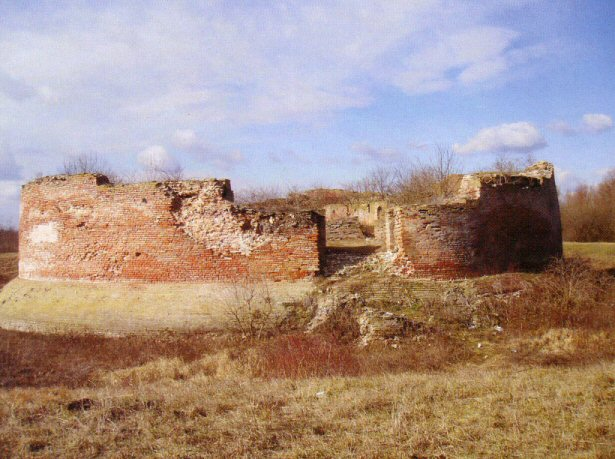
The ruins of the castle of Korođ (Kórógy) in Croatia, built by the Kórógyi family after the Mongol invasion

Philip (III) elevated into important positions in the royal court by the late 1250s. As a confidant of Queen Maria Laskarina, he served as ispán of Požega County from 1259 to 1266, and thus he plausibly supported Béla IV in the internal war against his son Duke Stephen. Simultaneously, Philip was referred to as Master of the cupbearers by royal charters in 1263. Philip also served as ispán of Valkó County – which then belonged to the realm of Béla, Duke of Slavonia – from 1265 or 1266 to 1267. Philip and his brothers built their stronghold at Kórógy (present-day Korođ, Croatia) sometime in the 1250s or 1260s; the Kórógyi family then adopted its surname ("nobiles de Korod") after the fort. Stephen V ascended the Hungarian throne following the death of his father in 1270. The new monarch sought to reconcile with Béla's former barons, who had not invested themselves heavily in the civil war. Upon the request of Cletus' sons, King Stephen V transcribed and confirmed his father's aforementioned donation regarding Kos, Dombró and Csapa in 1270, after his ascension to the Hungarian throne. It is plausible that Stephen V considered that Philip could be a key ally and mainstay in his power in Slavonia. Accordingly, Philip was appointed Master of the cupbearers. He held the dignity until the death of Stephen V in August 1272. Beside that he also administered Doboka County for a very brief period in the latter year, when the ailing monarch reorganized the government after the kidnapping of his son.

Philip lost political influence during the era of feudal anarchy, which characterized the reign of Ladislaus IV (r. 1272–1290). The Kórógyi brothers bought the estate Koromszó in Tolna County (present-day a borough of Máza in Baranya County) from Emeric Csák for 100 marks in 1276. In an unidentified year (possibly around 1275), Ladislaus, Philip and Gregory had a lawsuit against Apaj (II) Gutkeled over the rightful possession of Nezde and Kőröshegy in Somogy County (southern Balaton). Prior to 1290, the three brothers divided their inherited landholdings among themselves. When Gregory, who suffered from severe gout, made his last will and testament in that year, he bequeathed Orljavac with its castle to his only daughter Yolanda (the spouse of Ladislaus Nevnai from the gens (clan) Péc), while Kos, Apáti (Opatovac), Kórógy (with its castle), Csapa, Lippó, Zeeeya and Szava were inherited by Ladislaus and Philip, his brothers. Most of these estates were probably inherited and acquired over time. By the end of the 13th century, the Kórógyis possessed most of their lands in the lower part of the region Podravina along the river Drava. King Andrew III confirmed Gregory's last will and testament in October 1291. Yolanda and Ladislaus Nevnai were progenitors of the powerful Treutel and Garai families.

The three brothers – Ladislaus (I), Philip (III) and Gregory – died sometime after 1290, possibly prior to 1293 or 1294, when the sons of Ladislaus and Philip first appear in contemporary documents. Ladislaus (I) married twice. His first marriage produced a son John (I), while he had three additional sons from his second marriage: Philip (IV), Demetrius (I) and the youngest Ladislaus (II), who entered ecclesiastical career. Philip (III) also produced four sons: Lawrence (I), Philip (V), Ladislaus (III) and Demetrius (II). Gregory had no male descendants. In this generation, only Lawrence was able to preserve the family's influence in the royal court; in 1295, he was styled as Master of the stewards in the court of Queen mother Tomasina Morosini, who governed the province Slavonia on behalf of her son Andrew III. Lawrence (I) and Philip (V) first appear in 1293, when they, as neighboring landowners, protested against that Thomas Szentemágócs, Bishop of Bosnia and his brother Demetrius purchased the estate Koprivna. The two sides finally reached an agreement through the mediation of local nobles.

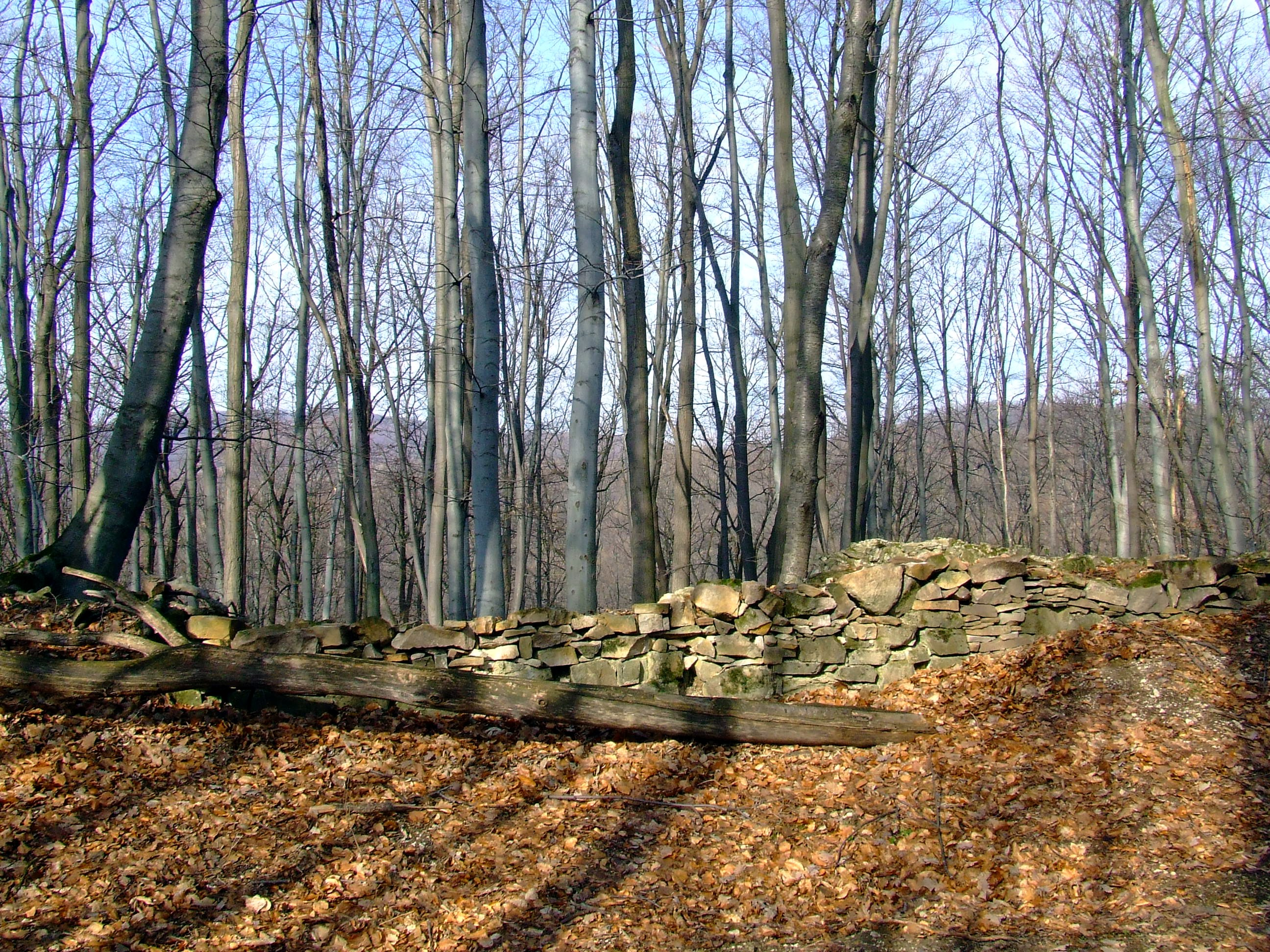
The ruins of Réka Castle in Mecseknádasd, owned by the Kórógyis at least since the late 13th century

Still in 1295, Lawrence (I) and his two brothers, Philip (V) and Ladislaus (III) donated Oroszi in Valkó County to their familiaris, the swordsman Alexander, who faithfully served the Kórógyi family for decades. Their lady, Tomasina Morosini contributed to the donation. In March 1296, the Kórógyis signed a property division agreement with each other to prevent further conflicts. The settlement was reached through mediation by a court appointed by Tomasina Morosini, Duchess of Slavonia. Accordingly, the sons of Philip (III) were granted half portions of Nádasd with its fort, along with Besenyő and Szőlős in Tolna County, and Szava, Zeeeya and Borra in Baranya County, while they also acquired the castle of Kórógy beyond the Drava. The sons of Ladislaus (I) waived compensation for their aforementioned destroyed property and received half portions of Orljavac in Požega County, together with the estates Hatház and Bethen along the river Drava. Since Orljavac was in foreign hands by then (see above), the family members jointly committed themselves to regaining it. In the same year, the sons of Philip (III) exchanged their land Zevebog beyond the Drava for Kölgyes (laid near Kórógy) with John Kölgyesi.

John (I) handed over the estate Tizin (Thyuzeu) to his stepmother and his half-brothers as annuities in 1298 until they reach legal adulthood. However, their relationship was not good either, because when he sold the Barázda estate, laid near Kos and Osijek (Eszék), his brothers protested against the procedure. John also had conflicts with his cousins over the determination of boundaries in Zeliz in Tolna County; the sons of Philip (III) even plundered his portion causing a damage of 300 marks. Within his immediate family, John made an estate division agreement with his younger half-siblings, to which Demetrius (I) subsequently joined in 1300.

During the reign of Andrew III, anarchic conditions continued throughout the kingdom, in which the Kórógyis also took part. Philip (V), in an alliance with Kemény, son of Lawrence, plundered and seized several lands of Conrad Győr in Baranya County in 1296, including Kéménd, Gyula, Olasz and Palkonya. In retaliation for the official complaint of Conrad Győr, Kemény and Philip (V) destroyed his several additional landholdings in the area, for instance Gréc and Csér. In 1299, Andrew III summoned the four sons of Ladislaus (I), who also often ravaged and plundered Conrad's estates, before his judicial court.

=== 14th century ===
==== Decline and recovery ====
The extinction of the Árpád dynasty in 1301, which was followed by a decade-long era of interregnum, seriously jeopardized the interests and property of the Kórógyis. The powerful Kőszegi family built up an oligarchic domain in the region, aggressively expanding into Southern Transdanubia and Slavonia. Until the early 1310s, the Kórógyis, however, were able to retain their strongholds. Border clashes continued to be regular in the region: in 1312, Philip (IV) made an agreement with Loquet, prior of the Hungarian–Slavonian Priory (Knights Hospitaller) to prevent further clashes between their troops regarding the landholding Bonahidakrassó (Bonahida Crasso) in Baranya County. Philip also possessed Babarin in the region. He died by 1319, when prior Francesco de Gragnana, Loquet's successor, confirmed the aforementioned agreement with Philip's brother, Bishop Ladislaus in the name of his namesake son Philip (VII), who is considered the founder of the family's Szeglak branch. Prior to February 1321, Lawrence (I), Philip (V) and Ladislaus (III) – who were referred to as "quondam nobiles de Kos" – stormed and seized the estates of the Nekcsei family in Požega County. Charles I ordered to return the possessions to their original owners.

Ladislaus (II), who entered ecclesiastical career, was elected the provost of the cathedral chapter of Pécs in 1300, but he could only enter his office in June 1310 because of the Kőszegis' resistance. Thereafter, Ladislaus was elected Bishop of Pécs in late 1314 or early 1315, becoming the most prominent of the Kórógyi family in the early 14th century. Aside from the bishop, Lawrence (I), as a former royal court official, also had some social prestige: his only known son Philip (VI) married a daughter of the once powerful baron Egidius Monoszló, while his unidentified daughter was the wife of Apor Szentgyörgyi from the gens Péc. According to Egidius' last will and testament from 1313, Szond, Bács County (today Sonta, Serbia) became a property of his son-in-law Philip.

Nevertheless, it was a difficult time in the family's history: John Kőszegi seized the castles Kórógy and Nádasd prior to 1316. Bishop Ladislaus took part in the royal campaign of King Charles I against the rebelling Kőszegi family in the counties of Baranya and Tolna from April to July 1316, and against the powerful Matthew III Csák in the siege of Komárom in October 1317. However, the peace concluded between the monarch and Matthew Csák scandalized the prelates, because it failed to dispose over the damages caused by the oligarch to them. They held an assembly in Kalocsa in February 1318. Here Thomas, the archbishop of Esztergom and his suffragan bishops appointed Ladislaus Kórógyi to express all their grievances, including the taxation of Church properties, to the monarch. This laid the foundation for the development of a strained relationship between Charles I and Ladislaus (II) for the following decades. One sign of this was that Charles kept the recaptured Kórógy and Nádasd as royal property. On the other hand, historian Attila Zsoldos believed that although Charles I returned the two castles to the Kórógyis, he confiscated them in 1321, because the sons of the late Philip (III) – the aforementioned Lawrence (I), Philip (V) and Ladislaus (III) – were convicted of "serious offenses" against the king. One of the surviving events of this rebellion may have been the plundering raids against the Nekcseis' estates. By February 1321, the castle of Kórógy was already administered by a royal castellan and the fort itself was later attached to the honour of the Ban of Macsó.

Around 1330, Bishop Ladislaus and his nephew Philip (VII), also known as Philpe, were granted the castles of Bršljanica (Berstyanóc) and Moslavina (Monoszló) with its accessories in Križevci County (both previously belonged to John Babonić) by Charles I as a compensation for the losses, because, as two charters from 1338 narrates, the bishop and his nephew did not participate in the "serious crimes committed against the king". Around this time, the bishop's relationship with the monarch improved significantly, and he visited the royal court several times. By that time, the other branch was represented by Philip (VI), or Philpus, who was the son of Lawrence (I). In March 1335, the remaining adult male members – Philip (VII) from the Szeglak branch, and Philip (VI) and Demetrius (III) from the Kórógyi branch, with the consent of Bishop Ladislaus (II) – reached an agreement on the division of their estates. the two (Szeglaki and Kórógyi) branches halved the estates Bršljanica, Moslavina and, after future redemption, Kórógy between each other. They committed themselves to the same procedure in the case of estates acquired later (through marriage and purchase). The relatives also agreed that if Philip (VI) and Demetrius (III) were unable to fulfill what they had undertaken in the agreement due to their current difficult situation and exile or for some other legitimate reason arising from the king's anger, the half of the Bršljanica and Moslavina estates and the castle of Bršljanica that was due to them under the agreement would return to the possession of the bishop and his nephew, Philip (VII). Prior to February 1338, Bishop Ladislaus requested the king to grant the formerly episcopal estate Garić (Garics or Podgaric) to the Kórógyi family, claiming that the estates received in exchange are not of equal value to the portions of their estates taken. Charles I ordered an investigation into the financial situation of the aforementioned possessions. In addition to the financial compensation, Philip (VII) also became a member of the royal household: he was referred to as a relator in 1337, and a royal knight in 1349. His main residence was in Szeglak in Baranya County (present-day a borough of Harkanovci, Croatia), where he possessed a castle, originally built by the Knights Hospitaller. His offspring, the Szeglaki (Seglački) family adopted their surname after that. Philip and his descendants also possessed the fort of Kos (near Zagradje, Croatia). Philip (VII) extended his influence over Osijek, buying up surrounding estates and gaining control over surrounding markets and trade routes in the 1340s. Thereafter, the city became an important residence of the Kórógyi family. He was granted the land Karanac in Baranya County by Louis I. There, Philip invited settlers and planted vineyards. He is last mentioned as a living person in 1358, when he vehemently defended his estates in judicial court against the other branch of the Kórógyi family.

The death of Charles I in 1342 marked a turning point in the life of the Kórógyi family. Bishop Ladislaus tried to establish a favorable relationship with the new monarch Louis I. In May 1343, the king returned all confiscated estates, including the forts Kórógy and Nádasd, to the Kórógyi family. Louis I justified his decision by saying that his father had been misled by malicious people when he confiscated the property of the bishop and his relatives, but the royal council testified that the Kórógyis had always been loyal partisans of the royal court. In exchange, the Kórógyis returned the strongholds Bršljanica and Moslavina to the crown. Philip (VI) was also rehabilitated politically; he regained the land Oroszi in Valkó County already in 1343, and he was styled as a royal knight in 1349. Bishop Ladislaus died in early 1346. His perseverance and endurance certainly saved the Kórógyi family from final irrelevance.

==== Political rise ====
Philip (VI) was involved in a lawsuit over the boundaries of several estates in Požega County against Denk Nekcsei in January 1350. Philip died in 1350 or 1351. He married twice since his widow, mentioned in 1352, was still young enough to remarry. His first marriage with the daughter of Egidius Monoszló produced three sons, Philip (VIII), Ladislaus (IV) and Lawrence (II), who died early "in the service of the king" (i.e. he was plausibly killed during a campaign), while he also had another son, Stephen (I), via second marriage. In 1351, the king appointed a royal committee – of which Philip (VII) from the Szeglak branch was also a member – to complete the settlement of Philip's inheritance, which was divided into three parts between Philip (VIII), Ladislaus (IV), and the still young Stephen (I) – the latter's interests were represented by Philip's widow, i.e. his second wife. The widow had to commit herself to supporting the child Stephen from his part of the income; if she remarried, this part, along with the associated burdens, would revert to Stephen's siblings; and the deceased's family archives were left in the possession of his older sons, since they were the first to have the means. However, since the parties did not submit to these provisions, a new agreement was established on 20 January 1352, at the court of Palatine Nicholas Zsámboki: this time it was decided that Philip's estates, namely Samatovci (Szombattelek), Osijek, Nádasd, Koprivna and Csapa, would be divided into three parts; one part, with Philip's house and buildings in Szombattelek, would be owned by his widow and Stephen until the latter became fully fledged and could share it with his brothers; the archives would go to Philip and Ladislaus, with the stipulation, however, that they would make it available to Stephen if necessary. This agreement came into effect since the three brothers jointly purchased their father's portion of the Osijek estate from Guillaume de La Jugie, provost of Titel in 1353. The sons of Philip (VI) were involved in a series of lawsuits against the Cikádor Abbey (in Bátaszék) over the port and market duties in Osijek throughout from 1351 to 1353. The Kórógyi family tried to appropriate this income, but the courts forced them to return it (only the customs duties remained from the Osijek taxes).

The rise of the family is the merit of Ladislaus (IV). As a skillful soldier, he distinguished himself in the Neapolitan campaigns of Louis the Great. He was styled as a royal knight in 1364, when the king donated the estate Koprivna in Valkó County to him for his merits. Following the Hungarian occupation of Vidin, Ladislaus was made Ban of Bulgaria, serving in this capacity from 1366 (or 1367) to 1368, alongside Benedict Himfi. Beside that, they jointly administered Temes County. Both Benedict and Ladislaus possessed the forts Orsova, Sebes, Temes, Zsidóvár and Miháld (present-day Orșova, Turnu Ruieni, Timișoara, Jidoara and Mehadia in Romania) as part of their honour, when they served as ban. Although he was dismissed from his position, Louis I emphasized that his trust in Ladislaus remained unbroken. Elijah, the castellan of Kórógy called Ladislaus as his lord in 1367. He appears in the royal court as a co-judge beside the king in 1382 and 1383. Under Ladislaus and his brothers, the castle of Osijek and the nearby Romanesque church of the Holy Trinity were reconstructed. The Croatian historiography attributes this achievement to Philip (VIII).

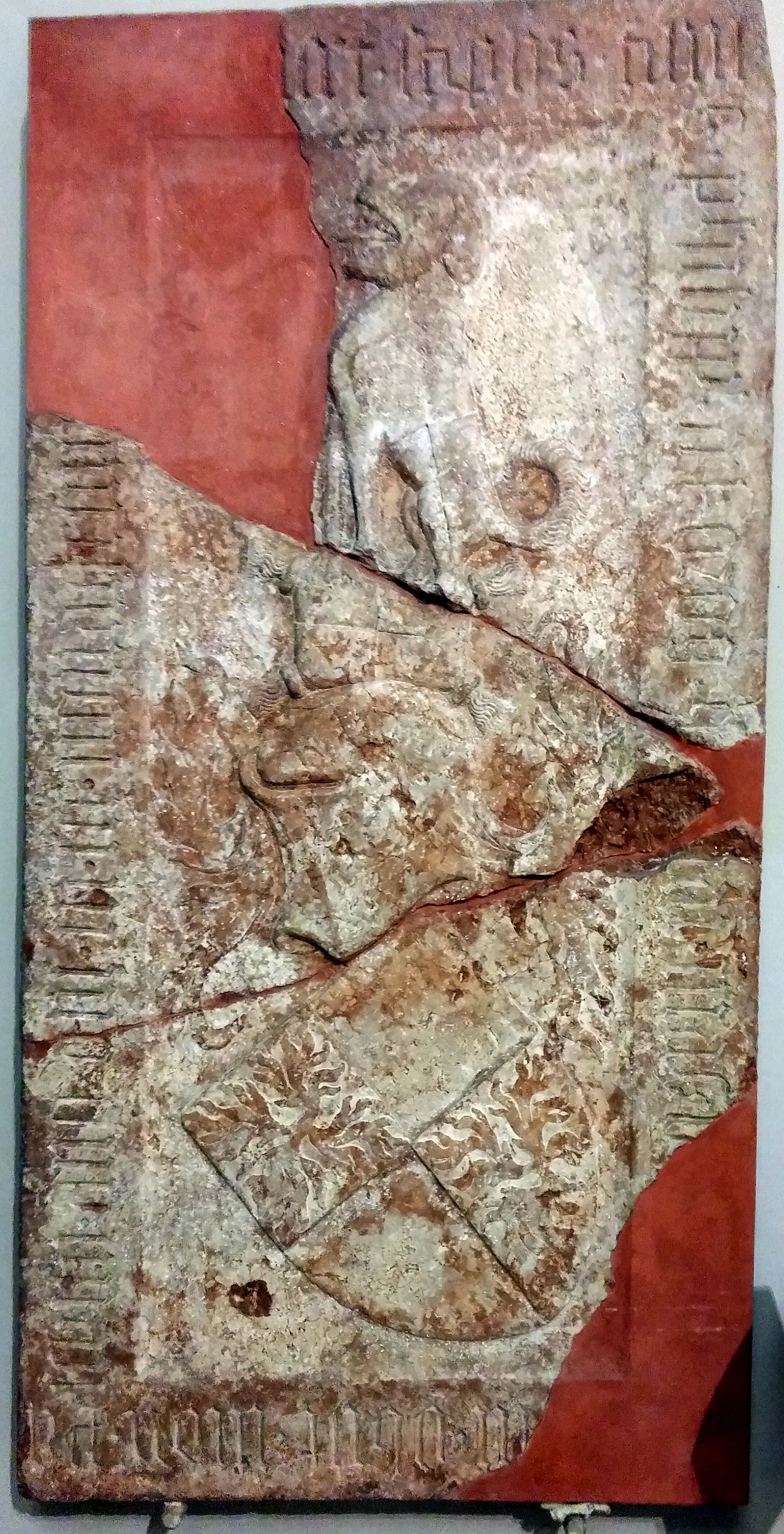
The tombstone of Stephen (I), located in the Holy Cross Church and Convent in Osijek

The increasing political and economic influence of the Kórógyi family was continued by Ladislaus' younger half-brother, Stephen (I). He served as Master of the doorkeepers from 1381 to 1382, in the last regnal years of Louis I. He came to prominence after the death of Louis. He was a loyal partisan of Mary, Queen of Hungary and her mother Elizabeth of Bosnia, while a civil war broke out for the Hungarian throne. He functioned as Ban of Macsó between 1382 and 1385, which became the queens' important mainstay against the supporters of Charles III of Naples. Upon his request, the queen donated the lands of the rebellious John of Palisna – including his namesake estate – in Slavonia to Stephen in July 1384, citing his merits and loyalty, and of his brothers. Queen Mary styled Stephen as a "baron" in her royal charter. Despite the growing discontent, Stephen (I) remained a key partisan of the queens. He took part in that meeting in Požega in the spring of 1385, where the Hungarian nobles decided to break off Mary's engagement with Sigismund and to engage her with Louis I, Duke of Orléans. However, soon, the queens' rivals took control over Slavonia and Croatia, and Stephen was dismissed and replaced as ban by John Horvat, a leading figure of Charles' league. By the end of the year, Charles was crowned as King of Hungary. His reign lasted only a few months, as he was assassinated in February 1386 at the instigation of Queen Elizabeth. Mary was restored to the throne, with her mother ruling in her name. However, the Horvat brothers rose in open rebellion on behalf of the murdered king's son, Ladislaus of Naples. When the queens decided to visit the southern counties of the kingdom that were controlled by supporters of Ladislaus, the Horvats, and John of Palisna and their retainers ambushed and attacked the queens and their retinue at Gorjani on 25 July 1386. Stephen (I), among others, was captured and imprisoned in Počitelj, the fort of John of Palisna. He was liberated, when the army of Sigismund besieged and captured the castle in May 1387. Thereafter, he led the royal army in Baranya and Slavonia against the rebellious Horvats, defeating them at Pobosuć, who were thus forced back into Bosnia. He captured many leaders of the uprising, including his relative Ladislaus (V) from the Szeglak branch. Stephen became a mainstay of Sigismund's reign thereafter. He was granted the royal land Cseri in Temes County (laid near present-day Sacoșu Turcesc, Romania) from Sigismund already in 1387.

While the Kórógyi family, primarily thanks to the paterfamilias Stephen, ended up on the winning side during the turbulent domestic political period of the 1380s, the Szeglaki family took a completely different path, which ultimately led to its marginalization. Louis I transcribed and confirmed his aforementioned 1343 donation letter upon the request of the sons of Philip (VII) – Ladislaus (V), Nicholas (I) and John (II) – in May 1364. The three brothers are only involved in local property matters until the 1370s. Nicholas was involved in a dispute over the boundaries of his estate in Kos with Philip (VIII) and Ladislaus (IV) in 1360. Following the death of Louis I, Ladislaus (V) joined the Horvat rebellion. After his capture, he was taken custody and transferred to Buda, where he was beheaded in 1388. King Sigismund confiscated his landholdings, including the forts Szeglak and Kos. The Szeglak branch disappears from sources by the early 15th century; its last known member was Emeric, the son of John (II). He tried to keep his estate Tizin (Tyzin) against the Alsánis during a lawsuit in 1391–92. The judicial court ruled in favor of Bishop Bálint Alsáni and his family. Emeric is referred to as a landowner adjacent to Madarasegyház in Baranya County in 1410.

King Sigismund donated the castle of Harsány (Szársomlyó) in Baranya County for his merits to Stephen (I) in 1388. He served as ispán of Keve and Krassó counties in 1389. In that year, he participated in Sigismund's campaign against the Ottoman Empire. During the 1389 campaign, Sigismund donated the estate Németi (present-day a borough of Szalánta) with its accessories (including portions in Nemetin, Asszonyfalva, Kovászd, Mocsár and Szilköz) in Baranya County in exchange for Paližna to Stephen (I) and his three elder sons, after the king confiscated them from the disgraced Lack de Szántó family. He remained a member of the royal household too; he was styled as relator in late 1390 and acted as a co-judge beside the monarch in March 1391. In these years, Stephen acquired those lands, which once belonged to the disgraced Szeglaki family; he secured Karanac in 1390, and the castle of Kos with the surrounding villages (including Csapa) in 1392 for himself and his descendants. When Stephen (I) returned the confiscated estates to the Lack de Szántó family after they received royal pardon, Sigismund granted half of the fortress of Ivánkaszentgyörgy (Ivankovo) in Valkó County to hims as compensation in 1394. At the end of his life, Stephen again served as Ban of Macsó from 1394 to 1397, alongside Nicholas Treutel. Beside that, they also held the office of ispán of Baranya and Valkó counties. Stephen died in 1397. He was buried in the Holy Cross Church and Convent in Osijek. The fragments of his tombstone, which depicts the family coat-of-arms, were excavated in 1960 and 1993. The Croatian historiography claims that this tombstone belonged to Philip (VIII), who allegedly died in 1394 (however, in fact, he was already dead in 1363). Of the brothers, only Stephen had known descendants from his unidentified wife, who was a third-degree relative of him, therefore, special permission from Pope Urban VI was required posteriorly to legalize the marriage in 1389. To raise the money for the dispensation, Stephen sold his estate Szamoskórógy in Transylvania. One of his sons, John (III) served as Master of the horse between 1395 and 1396, during his father's lifetime. Ladislaus (VI) participated in Sigismund's campaign against Prokop of Moravia in 1399.

=== 15th century ===
==== Counts of Castell ====
By the beginning of the 15th century, Philip (IX), also known as Philpus, who was the third son of Stephen (I), became head of the Kórógyi family, since John (III) and Ladislaus (VI) no longer appear in the sources. Throughout the decades, Philip was involved in many lawsuit against his neighbors, the Monostori family. He remained a strong partisan of King Sigismund even during a nationwide rebellion against his rule; he joined the League of Siklós, centered around Nicholas Garai, which released the king from captivity and desired to maintain his reign. He served as ispán (castellan) of the royal fort of Miháld (present-day Mehadia, Romania) alongside John Alsáni in 1402. In this capacity, he attended the general diet held in Pressburg (present-day Bratislava, Slovakia) in September 1402, where the magnates of Hungary declared that they will elect Albert IV, Duke of Austria as the king of Hungary, if Sigismund dies without a male heir. He remained an influential partisan of Sigismund in 1403–1404, when a civil war broke out between the monarch and the supporters of rival claimant Ladislaus of Naples. He was made ispán of Temes and Krassó counties, and castellan of Sebes Castle (today Turnu Ruieni, Romania) in 1404, together with John Alsáni. Upon Philip's request, Sigismund confirmed him and his younger brothers, Nicholas (II) and Stephen (II), as the rightful owners of the fort Kos and its accessories in January 1406. In the summer of 1406, he performed diplomatic service to the Kingdom of Aragon. In March 1412, he accompanied Sigismund to the negotiations with King Władysław II Jagiełło of Poland in the town of Lubló in Szepes County (present-day Stará Ľubovňa, Slovakia). He was appointed Treasurer of the Queen's Court in late 1412 or early 1413. It was the most prestigious office in the court of Queen Barbara of Cilli.

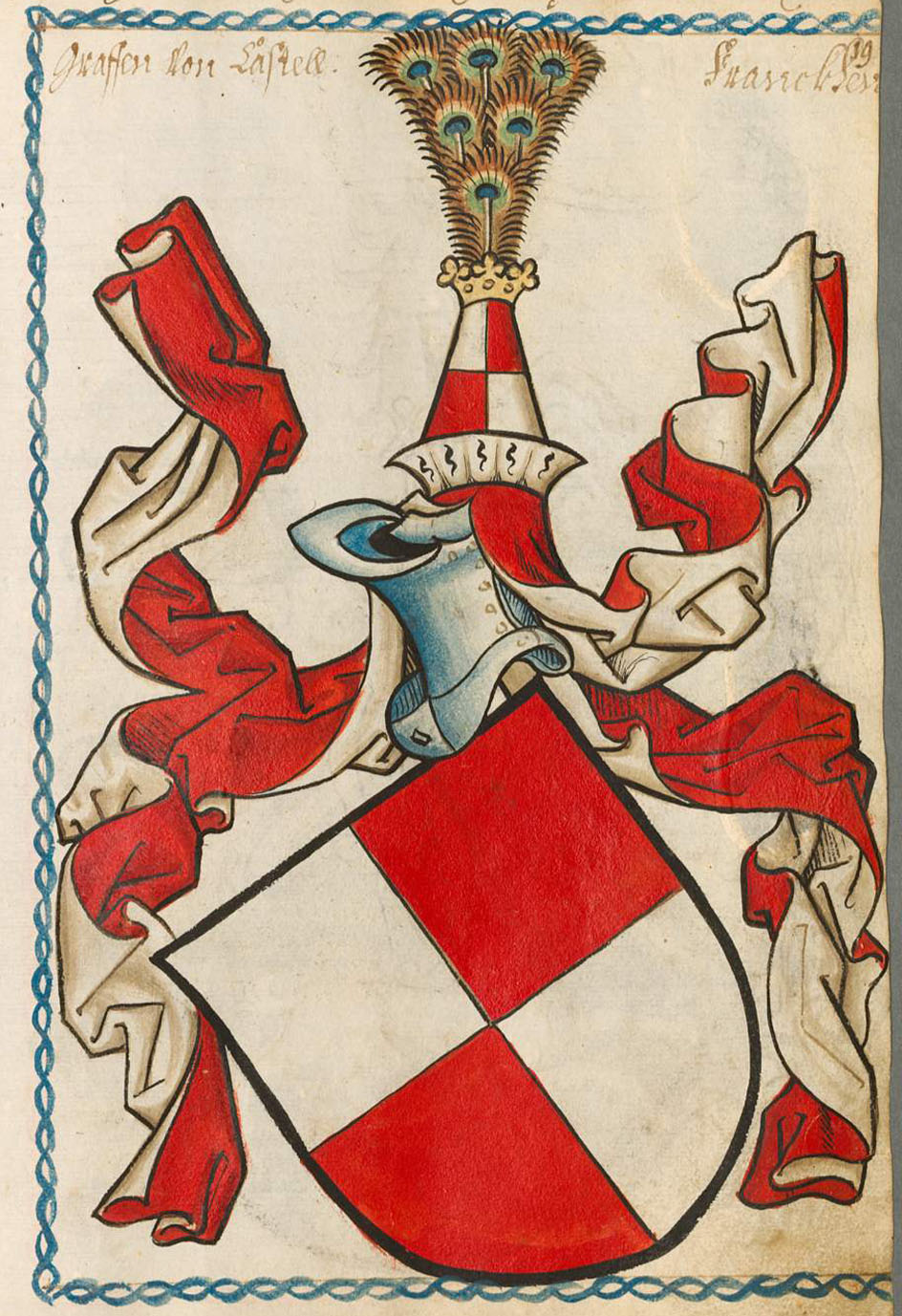
Original coat-of-arms of the Counts of Castell, from the Scheiblersches Wappenbuch

Philip (IX) was present in the Council of Constance from 1414 to 1418. There, he met the members of the House of Castell, a German noble family from the Holy Roman Empire. Here, both sides noticed that their coats of arms – squared red-silver triangular shield – were identical to the other side's, which suggested the existence of a previously forgotten kinship relationship between the two families. With the support of King Sigismund, they adopted each other as brothers or relatives, and in addition to the adoption, they gave each other permission to take each other's titles. Since 1417, consequently, Philip (IX) was styled himself as "Count of Castell and Lord of Kórógy" (Latin: comes de Castellis dominusque de Korogh). He was granted the right to use red wax seal too. The use of the title of count did not extend to Philip's still living brother, Stephen (II). After the Counts of Cilli of foreign origin, the Kórógyi family was the first indigenous family in the Kingdom of Hungary to hold the title of count in the Western European sense from the ranks of the secular aristocracy. In late 1434, Philip's son, John (IV) concluded a mutual inheritance agreement with William II, Count of Castell; if William or his descendants died without an heir, their lordship with all its appurtenances could be inherited by John or his descendants. And although Kórógyi received permission to use the title of Count of Castell from William, it was stipulated that he would not have any rights over the county and its appurtenances or subjects until William's family died out. The same was stipulated by the parties regarding the Kórógyi estates in Hungary. As a sign of kinship, William called himself Count of Castell (comes de Castell) and Lord of Kórógy (dominus de Korogd). Similarly to his father, John was granted the right to use red wax seal.

Compared to Philip, his younger brothers had much more modest career. In 1411, Nicholas (II) and Stephen (II) borrowed 1,200 golden florins from David Lack de Szántó; in exchange, they had returned their portions in the estate Németi and its accessories to the Lack family. In early 1417, Stephen (II), also representing his brothers, requested Palatine Nicholas Garai to transcribe the above-mentioned 1258 and 1270 donation letters made by Béla IV and Stephen V, respectively, in favor of the Kórógyi family. Garai confirmed these donations after verification of the validity of documents. Nicholas (II) is last mentioned as a living person in February 1418, during an act of domination with his brothers. After the death of their brother-in-law, Peter Atyinai in 1418, Philip (IX) and Stephen (II), also in the name of Philip's son, John (IV), tried unsuccessfully to acquire the lordships of Darnóc (today Slatinski Drenovac in Croatia) and Atyina for their family in October in that year, citing a previous pledge to their sister Dorothea, but King Sigismund, due to the opposition of the surrounding barons, including the Garais, annulled the contracts between the Kórógyis and Sigismund Atyinai, granting the estates to the latter as hereditary possessions in August 1419.

Stephen (II) married Catherine, the daughter of David Lack, Ban of Slavonia. In October 1423, Pope Martin V granted them the right to freely choose a preacher. Stephen's name only appears in legal cases with the Kórógyis' neighbors, mostly with the Harapki (Botos) family regarding the lordship of Ivankovo. He was styled as a magnate in 1427, when he was among the nobles, who declared his support for reform of the Queen's income. Stephen (II) last appears in contemporary records in March 1430. Stephen and Catherine had two daughters, Apollonia and Ursula. In August 1458, Stephen's widow and daughters, among other nobles, sent a complaint regarding King Matthias Corvinus' intention to donate the fort of Bálványos (today ruins in Unguraș, Romania) to John Geréb de Vingárt.

==== Defenders of the southern province ====
John (IV), who started his service at the court of Sigismund too, became the most illustrious member of the Kórógyi family, perhaps even surpassing the career of his grandfather, Stephen (I). His two sisters, Catherine and Maria were married lords John Perényi and Ákos Csupor, respectively, providing a respectable and influential kinship for him. John's career began to rise during Albert's short reign in the late 1430s. He took part in Albert's unfortunate campaign against the Ottoman Empire in the autumn of 1439. During the emerging civil war after the death of the king, John was a staunch supporter of the dowager queen, Elizabeth then her infant son Ladislaus the Posthumous, belonging to the magnate league led by Ladislaus Garai. Possibly after the coronation of Ladislaus V as King of Hungary in May 1440, Elizabeth appointed John (IV) as Judge royal. Initially, there were attempts at compromise between the two parties. For instance, Elizabeth's rival, Vladislaus I acknowledged John in his position, and, as Elizabeth's envoy, John (IV) attempted to mediate between Elizabeth and Vladislaus, but this effort remained unsuccessful. The pro-Vladislaus Diet of Hungary later did not consider his tenure legitimate. He participated in the Battle of Bátaszék in January 1441, where John Hunyadi, together with Nicholas Újlaki, annihilated the pro-Elizabeth army. John then lost his political influence at the Hungarian royal court for years.

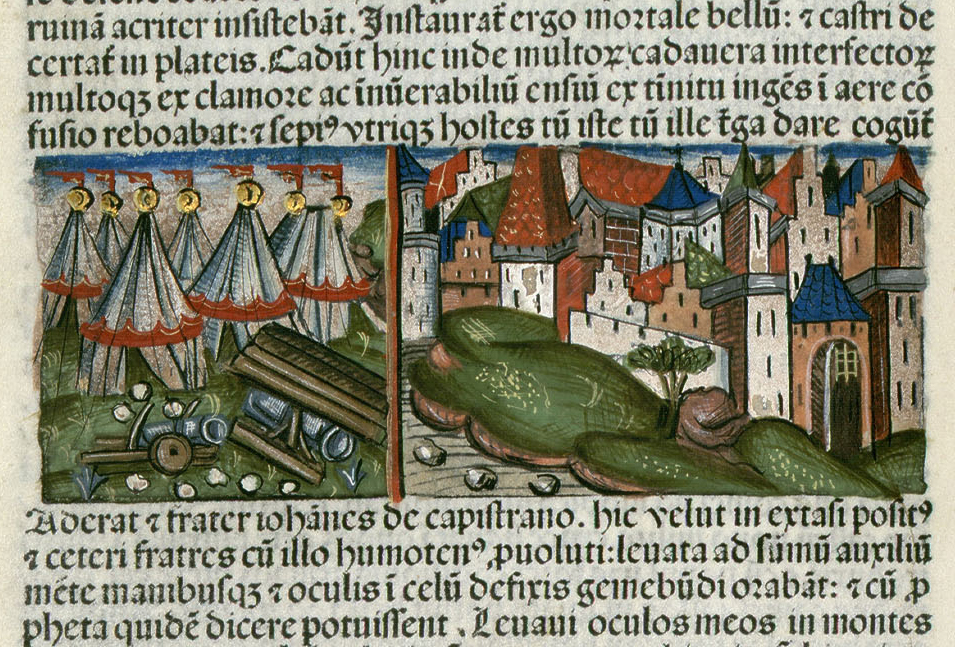
The Siege of Belgrade (Chronica Hungarorum, 1488)

He returned to the elite after Vladislaus was killed in the Battle of Varna in November 1444. He became a strong ally and supporter of his former enemy, John Hunyadi who became the de facto ruler of Hungary thereafter. John (IV) was installed as Ban of Macsó in late 1447, holding the dignity until his death. Beside that, he also administered Bács, Baranya, Bodrog, Syrmia, Tolna and Valkó counties as part of his dignity's honour. In this role, he played an important role in maintaining the southern border defense system, consisting of a chain of fortresses, set up against Ottoman incursions and large-scale invasions. As a ban, he held his official residence in Osijek, from where he judged disputes between the nobles and church institutions of Valkó, Baranya and the surrounding counties. Following the Battle of Kosovo in late 1448, John (IV) was among the barons who negotiated with the then Ottoman-ally Serbian despot Đurađ Branković to achieve the release of John Hunyadi. As a royal envoy, he met King Thomas of Bosnia at Dobor Fortress in November 1449, in order to increase the security of the Hungarian borders against the Ottoman incursions. Since 1450, John administered Požega County too, while he maintained his aforementioned positions. He acquired the half portion of the castle of Darnóc and several surrounding villages in Križevci County in June 1450. In February 1452, he attended that Diet, which assembled in Pressburg to send a delegation to Vienna, where the Austrian noblemen rose up in open rebellion against Frederick III of Germany, King Ladislaus' guardian. In the next month, he was a member of the aforementioned delegation which concluded an agreement with the Austrian estates and the Czech and Moravian nobles at the Diet in Vienna to force Frederick to release the young Ladislaus V. From mid-1453, John (IV) also served as ispán of Vrbas (Orbász) County. In that year, he acquired the fort of Ivánkaszentgyörgy (Ivankovo) in Valkó County, which he already possessed as a pledge from the Harapki (Botos) family. In early 1454, he concluded a mutual inheritance contract with his brother-in-law John Perényi. Around the same time, he acquired the castle Orljavac in Požega County as a pledge from the Cseh de Léva family; the castle was once, at the end of the 13th century owned by the Kórógyis.

In December 1454, John (IV) met with John Hunyadi, Ladislaus Garai, Nicholas Újlaki and other barons in Petrovaradin to discuss the organization of anti-Ottoman defense system, stating that they received help from German mercenary knights. In June 1455, he signed the document in Győr in which the barons swore allegiance to Ladislaus V. After the Ottoman capture of Novo Brdo in the summer of 1455, the barons responsible for the southern border system, including John (IV), were busy preparing for defense against a large-scale Ottoman invasion. In January 1456, he presumably attended that war council, where the barons agreed to prepare military action against the Ottomans. When the Ottoman forces under Mehmed II marched through Serbia and approached Nándorfehérvár (modern-day Belgrade) in June 1456, John (IV), beside Hunyadi and his familiares, was the only baron of the realm, who marched to the stronghold with his banderium, maybe because Belgrade belonged to the Banate of Macsó. The siege and the nearby battle resulted the crusaders' victory. It is presumable that John (IV) died of bubonic plague had broken out and killed many people in the crusaders' camp. At the time of his death, John (IV) was one of the richest barons in the southern part of the kingdom. His permanent residence was his fortified manor in Osijek. He possessed several castles, the ancient seat Kórógy, Ivankovo and Nevna (present-day Levanjska Varoš, Croatia) in Valkó County, Baranyavár (present-day Branjin Vrh, Croatia) and Harsány (Szársomlyó) and a portion in Pécsvárad in Baranya County, Cseri in Temes County, Drenovac in Križevci County and Orljavac in Požega County.

==== Extinction ====
John (IV), who married three times, only had one son who lived to adulthood; Caspar, who was born in the 1440s from his marriage with his third wife, Elizabeth Garai from her family's Bánfi branch. She was a mainstay for her son for many years. In February 1459, Caspar was among the nobles who took a written oath of allegiance to King Matthias Corvinus, who faced a conspiracy, led by Ladislaus Garai and Nicholas Újlaki, against his rule. Except for this, he did not participate in public life due to his young age and the changed political situation. Still in 1459, he exchanged his lands in Bács County with the king's uncle Michael Szilágyi for the latter's possessed portions in the lordship of Németi. Caspar and his mother were involved in several lawsuit against their neighbors in the early 1460s. He participated in King Matthias' war in Bosnia, which directed against the Turks, in the autumn of 1465.

Prior to 1467, Caspar was engaged to Apollonia Rozgonyi. She was a daughter of the powerful baron John Rozgonyi, who has been Master of the treasury at the time of the betrothal. However, Caspar broke off his engagement with Apollonia to marry another woman, who was also his relative and was considered an "uncanonical marriage". His act caused a great uproar among the Hungarian elite; in early 1467, King Matthias confiscated the fortified manor of Szeglak and the surrounding villages in Baranya County from Caspar and donated them to his royal courtier Balthasar Ramocsa. In the period after the break-off of the engagement, Elizabeth Garai donated almost all of their estates to the Rozgonyis, which could be connected with the act of breaking off the engagement, which, in addition to losing royal favor, put the family in difficult circumstances. Among the donated landholdings, the forts Darnóc, Orljavac, Nevna and Ivankovo, in addition to several settlements in Križevci, Požega and Valkó counties, were included, but, according to a 1469 tax register, the Rozgonyis also possessed the lordship of Kórógy, in addition to the towns Osijek, Aljmaš (Hagymás) and Draszád, in that year.

Sometime around 1471, King Matthias pardoned Caspar, citing his young age and the merits of his family, which they had accomplished in the service of the Kingdom of Hungary, and returned the previously confiscated estates to him. However, in early 1472, Caspar was killed in a minor border clash with the Turks, which resulted the extinction of the Kórógyi family after three centuries. According to the calculations made by historian Pál Engel, Caspar possessed four castles, 11 market towns and 284 villages at the time of his death. King Matthias granted his landholdings to Caspar's cousin Nicholas Csupor, but John Ungor de Nádasd also received a smaller portion of the wealth. In the following years, the once huge Kórógyi fortune was divided among several noble families.

== Family tree ==
Based on the researches of Mór Wertner (1892) and Pál Engel (2001).

- Philip I
  - Philip II (d. before 1241)
    - daughters (1241†)
  - Cletus (1241†) ∞ Macha N (fl. 1243–1244)
    - a daughter (fl. 1241–1244) ∞ Vincent Báncsa
    - Ladislaus I (fl. 1243–1290) ∞ married twice, (2) N (fl. 1298)
      - (1) John I (fl. 1294–1299)
      - (2) Philip IV (Philpus; fl. 1294–1312) --> Szeglaki (Kosi) sub-branch
        - Philip VII (Philpe; fl. 1319–1358; d. before 1360) ∞ unidentified (fl. 1360)
          - Ladislaus V (fl. 1353–1388†)
          - Nicholas I (fl. 1360–1374)
          - John II (fl. 1364–1378; d. before 1390)
            - Emeric (fl. 1391–1410)
      - (2) Demetrius I (fl. 1294–1300)
      - (2) Ladislaus II (fl. 1296–1346†)
    - Philip III (fl. 1243–1290)
      - Lawrence I (fl. 1293–1321)
        - Philip VI (Philpus; fl. 1313–1350; d. before 1351) ∞ (1) N Monoszló (fl. 1313), (2) N (fl. 1352)
          - (1) Philip VIII (Philpe; fl. 1351–1360; d. before 1363)
          - (1) Ladislaus IV (fl. 1351–1382; d. before 1384)
          - (1) Lawrence II (d. before 1384)
          - (2) Stephen I (fl. 1352–1397†) ∞ N (fl. 1389–1401)
            - John III (fl. 1384–1399)
            - Ladislaus VI (fl. 1384–1399)
            - Philip IX (Philpus; fl. 1384–1432; d. before 1433) ∞ Helena Jolsvai (fl. 1433–1436)
              - John IV (fl. 1411–1456†) ∞ (1) Barbara Garai (fl. 1434), (2) Anne Maróti (fl. 1437), (3) Elizabeth Bánfi de Gara (fl. 1443–1467)
                - (3) Caspar (fl. 1447–1472†), last male member ∞ Apollonia Rozgonyi (betrothed)
              - Catherine (fl. 1434–1454) ∞ John Perényi (fl. 1454)
              - Maria (fl. 1434–1481) ∞ Ákos Csupor
            - Nicholas II (fl. 1399–1418)
            - Stephen II (fl. 1399–1430) ∞ Catherine Lack de Szántó (fl. 1423–1458)
              - Apollonia (fl. 1458)
              - Ursula (fl. 1458)
            - Dorothea (fl. 1418–1420) ∞ Peter Atyinai (1418†)
        - a daughter (fl. 1351) ∞ Apor Szentgyörgyi
      - Philip V (fl. 1293–1321)
      - Ladislaus III (fl. 1293–1321)
        - Demetrius III (fl. 1335)
      - Demetrius II (fl. 1295)
    - Gregory (fl. 1243–1296)
      - Yolanda (fl. 1290) ∞ Ladislaus Nevnai
  - Chen (fl. 1259) ∞ Peter Apor (d. before 1259)

== Sources ==
=== Primary sources ===
- Simon of Kéza: The Deeds of the Hungarians (Edited and translated by László Veszprémy and Frank Schaer with a study by Jenő Szűcs) (1999). CEU Press. ISBN 963-9116-31-9.
- Bak, János M.; Veszprémy, László; Kersken, Norbert (2018). Chronica de gestis Hungarorum e codice picto saec. XIV [The Illuminated Chronicle: Chronicle of the deeds of the Hungarians from the fourteenth-century illuminated codex]. Budapest: Central European University Press. ISBN 978-9-6338-6264-3.

=== Secondary sources ===
- Andrić, Stanko (2009). "Korođski (Kórógyi)". Hrvatski Biografski Leksikon (in Croatian). Miroslav Krleža Lexicographical Institute.
- Brkanić, Monika (2026). "Bračne veze obitelji Korođski [Marriage Alliances of the Family of Kórógy]". Osijeker Sammelband (in Croatian). 41. Muzej Slavonije Osijek: 9–15. ISSN 0473-4882.
- Brkanić, Monika; Njari, Denis (2025). "Pregled službi i funkcija plemića Korođskih unutar vladarskog aparata srednjovjekovnog Ugarsko-Hrvatskog Kraljevstva [An Overview of the Offices and Roles of the Noble Lords of Kórógy within the Governance Apparatus of the Medieval Kingdom of Hungary–Croatia]". In Bockovac, Tímea; Grgić, Stipica; Lehocki-Samardžić, Ana; Varga, Szabolcs (eds.). Otthon két hazában. Ünnepi tanulmánykötet Sokcsevits Dénes tiszteletére / Dom(a) u obje domovine. Zbornik radova u čast Dinka Šokčevića [At home in Two Countries. A Celebratory Volume of Studies in Honor of Dénes Sokcsevits] (in Croatian). Magyarországi Horvát Oktatásért Alapítvány / Zaklada za hrvatsko školstvo u Mađarskoj, Glotta Nyelvi Intézet / Institut za jezik Glotta, Horvát Történettudományi Intézet / Hrvatski institut za povijest, ELTE HTK Történettudományi Kutatóintézet / Institut za istraživanje povijesti Centra za istraživanje humanističkih znanosti Sveučilišta Eötvös Loránd. pp. 157–167. ISBN 978-615-02-5447-0.
- Engel, Pál (1994). "Kórógyi". In Kristó, Gyula; Engel, Pál; Makk, Ferenc (eds.). Korai magyar történeti lexikon (9-14. század) [Encyclopedia of the Early Hungarian History (9th-14th centuries)] (in Hungarian). Akadémiai Kiadó. p. 369. ISBN 963-05-6722-9.
- Engel, Pál (1996). Magyarország világi archontológiája, 1301–1457, I. [Secular Archontology of Hungary, 1301–1457, Volume I] (in Hungarian). História, MTA Történettudományi Intézete. ISBN 963-8312-44-0.
- Mályusz, Elemér (1971). Az V. István-kori geszta [The Gesta of the Age of Stephen V]. Akadémiai Kiadó.
- Mažuran, Ive (1994). Srednjovjekovni i turski Osijek [Medieval and Turkish Osijek] (in Croatian). Zavod za znanstveni rad HAZU u Osijeku, Gradsko poglavarstvo Osijek, Školska knjiga Zagreb. ISBN 953-154-040-3.
- Neumann, Tibor (2014). "Találkozó Konstanzban: A Kórógyiak grófi címe [Meeting in Konstanz: The Title of the Kórógyi Counts]". Turul (in Hungarian). 87 (3). Magyar Heraldikai és Genealógiai Társaság: 104–108. ISSN 1216-7258.
- Pauler, Gyula (1899). A magyar nemzet története az Árpád-házi királyok alatt, I. [The History of the Hungarian Nation during the Árpádian Kings, Vol. 1.] (in Hungarian). Athenaeum.
- Wertner, Mór (1892). "Családtörténeti adalékok. Az első Kórógyiak [Family History Additions. The First Kórógyis]". Turul (in Hungarian). 10: 166–172. ISSN 1216-7258.
- Wertner, Mór (1900). "A Kórógyiak őse [The Ancestor of the Kórógyis]". Századok (in Hungarian). 34 (10). Magyar Történelmi Társulat: 867–872. ISSN 0039-8098.
- Zsoldos, Attila (2007). Családi ügy: IV. Béla és István ifjabb király viszálya az 1260-as években [A family affair: The Conflict between Béla IV and Junior King Stephen in the 1260s] (in Hungarian). História, MTA Történettudományi Intézete. ISBN 978-963-9627-15-4.
- Zsoldos, Attila (2011). Magyarország világi archontológiája, 1000–1301 [Secular Archontology of Hungary, 1000–1301] (in Hungarian). História, MTA Történettudományi Intézete. ISBN 978-963-9627-38-3.
- Zsoldos, Attila (2024). "László püspök várai [The Castles of Bishop Ladislaus]". In Hunyadi, Zsolt; Tamás, Kőfalvi (eds.). Napok, évek, századok. Tanulmányok Almási Tibor 65. születésnapjára (in Hungarian). SZTE Történeti Intézete és Történelemtudományi Doktori Iskolája. pp. 531–545. ISBN 978-963-306-965-3.
