= Ladislaus Kórógyi (ban) =

Hungarian lord

Ladislaus (IV) Kórógyi

Ban of Bulgaria
- Reign: 1366–1368
- Predecessor: Emeric Lackfi; Denis Lackfi
- Successor: Benedict Himfi
- Died: 1383 or 1384
- Noble family: House of Kórógyi
- Father: Philip VI Kórógyi
- Mother: N Monoszló

Ladislaus (IV) Kórógyi (Hungarian: Kórógyi (IV.) László; died 1383 or 1384) was a Hungarian nobleman and soldier in the 14th century, who administered the Hungarian-occupied Vidin and its surrounding areas, bearing the title "Ban of Bulgaria", from 1366 to 1368.

== Background ==
Ladislaus (IV) was born in the 1320s into the prestigious Kórógyi family, which possessed lands in southern Transdanubia and northern Slavonia, primarily around the town Osijek. His parents were Philip (VI), also known as Philpus, and his father's first wife, who was an unidentified daughter of the once powerful baron Egidius Monoszló. He had two brothers Philip (VIII), also known as Philpe, and Lawrence (II). Later, their father remarried which produced another son Stephen (I), an illustrious member of the family.

When Ladislaus was growing up, the family went through a difficult time during the era of feudal anarchy. Charles I of Hungary confiscated several domains from them, but the perseverance and endurance of Bishop Ladislaus (II) (the uncle of Ladislaus' father) saved the Kórógyi family from final irrelevance. The newly crowned monarch Louis I of Hungary returned all confiscated estates, including the forts Kórógy and Nádasd, to the Kórógyi family in 1343. Philip (VI) and other relatives entered royal service then, which began the family's slow climb back into the elite.

== Career ==
As a young knight, Ladislaus Kórógyi distinguished himself in the Neapolitan campaigns of Louis the Great took place between 1347 and 1352. The circumstances of his military exploits are unknown. It is plausible that his brother Lawrence (II) was killed during the same campaign.

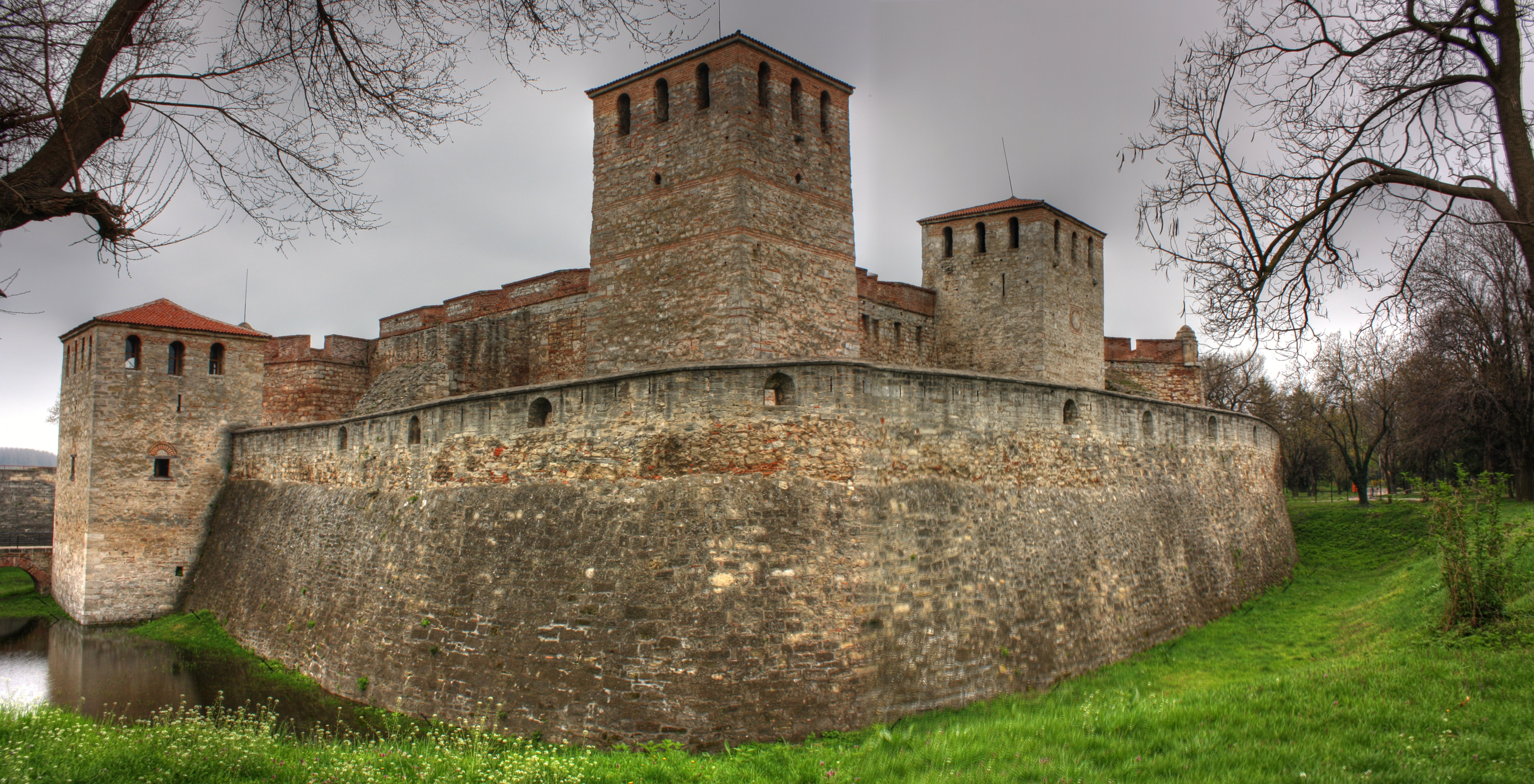
Baba Vida, Vidin's medieval fortress

Their father Philip (VI) died in 1350 or 1351. In the latter year, King Louis I appointed a royal committee to complete the settlement of Philip's inheritance, which was divided into three parts between Philip (VIII), Ladislaus (IV), and the still minor Stephen (I) – the latter's interests were represented by Philip's widow, i.e. his second wife. The widow had to commit herself to supporting the child Stephen from his part of the income; if she remarried, this part, along with the associated burdens, would revert to Stephen's siblings; and the deceased's family archives were left in the possession of his older sons, since they were the first to have the means. However, since the parties did not submit to these provisions, a new agreement was established on 20 January 1352, at the court of Palatine Nicholas Zsámboki: this time it was decided that Philip's estates, namely Samatovci (Szombattelek), Osijek, Nádasd, Koprivna and Csapa, would be divided into three parts; one part, with Philip's house and buildings in Szombattelek, would be owned by his widow and Stephen until the latter became fully fledged and could share it with his brothers; the archives would go to Philip and Ladislaus, with the stipulation, however, that they would make it available to Stephen if necessary. This agreement came into effect since the three brothers jointly purchased their father's portion of the Osijek estate from Guillaume de La Jugie, provost of Titel in 1353. Ladislaus and his brothers were involved in a series of lawsuits against the Cikádor Abbey (in Bátaszék) over the port and market duties in Osijek throughout from 1351 to 1353. The Kórógyi family tried to appropriate this income, but the courts forced them to return it (only the customs duties remained from the Osijek taxes). He and his brother Philip (VIII) were involved in a dispute over the boundaries of their estate in Kos with their relative Nicholas (I) from the family's Szeglak branch in 1360.

He took part in the royal campaign against Bosnia in 1363, which caused a postponement of his lawsuit against Alexander Nekcsei. He was styled as a royal knight in 1364, when the king donated the estate Koprivna in Valkó County to him for his merits. Following the Hungarian occupation of Vidin, Kórógyi was made Ban of Bulgaria, serving in this capacity from 1366 (or 1367) to 1368, alongside Benedict Himfi. Beside that, they jointly administered Temes County. Both Benedict Himfi and Ladislaus Kórógyi possessed the forts Orsova, Sebes, Temes, Zsidóvár and Miháld (present-day Orșova, Turnu Ruieni, Timișoara, Jidoara and Mehadia in Romania) as part of their honour, when they served as ban. Although he was dismissed from his position, Louis I emphasized that his trust in Kórógyi remained unbroken. Elijah, the castellan of Kórógy called Ladislaus Kórógyi as his lord in 1367. He appears in the royal court as a co-judge beside the monarchs Louis I, then Mary in 1382 and 1383. Under Kórógyi and his brothers, the castle of Osijek and the nearby Romanesque church of the Holy Trinity were reconstructed. Ladislaus Kórógyi died by July 1384. He had no known descendants.

== Sources ==
- Brkanić, Monika; Njari, Denis (2025). "Pregled službi i funkcija plemića Korođskih unutar vladarskog aparata srednjovjekovnog Ugarsko-Hrvatskog Kraljevstva [An Overview of the Offices and Roles of the Noble Lords of Kórógy within the Governance Apparatus of the Medieval Kingdom of Hungary–Croatia]". In Bockovac, Tímea; Grgić, Stipica; Lehocki-Samardžić, Ana; Varga, Szabolcs (eds.). Otthon két hazában. Ünnepi tanulmánykötet Sokcsevits Dénes tiszteletére / Dom(a) u obje domovine. Zbornik radova u čast Dinka Šokčevića [At home in Two Countries. A Celebratory Volume of Studies in Honor of Dénes Sokcsevits] (in Croatian). Magyarországi Horvát Oktatásért Alapítvány / Zaklada za hrvatsko školstvo u Mađarskoj, Glotta Nyelvi Intézet / Institut za jezik Glotta, Horvát Történettudományi Intézet / Hrvatski institut za povijest, ELTE HTK Történettudományi Kutatóintézet / Institut za istraživanje povijesti Centra za istraživanje humanističkih znanosti Sveučilišta Eötvös Loránd. pp. 157–167. ISBN 978-615-02-5447-0.
- Engel, Pál (1996). Magyarország világi archontológiája, 1301–1457, I. [Secular Archontology of Hungary, 1301–1457, Volume I] (in Hungarian). História, MTA Történettudományi Intézete. ISBN 963-8312-44-0.
- Wertner, Mór (1892). "Családtörténeti adalékok. Az első Kórógyiak [Family History Additions. The First Kórógyis]". Turul (in Hungarian). 10: 166–172. ISSN 1216-7258.

Ladislaus IV House of Kórógyi Born: ? Died: 1383 or 1384
Political offices
Preceded by Emeric Lackfi & Denis Lackfi	Ban of Bulgaria alongside Benedict Himfi; 1366–1368	Succeeded by Benedict Himfi
