= Philip III Kórógyi =

Hungarian lord

Philip (III) Kórógyi

Master of the cupbearers
- Reign: 1263; 1270–1272
- Predecessor: Conrad Győr (1st term); James Bána (2nd term)
- Successor: Peter Káta (1st term); Lawrence (2nd term)
- Died: after 1290
- Noble family: House of Kórógyi
- Issue: Lawrence I Philip V Ladislaus III; Demetrius II
- Father: Keled Kórógyi
- Mother: Macha N

Philip (III) Kórógyi (Hungarian: Kórógyi (III.) Fülöp; died after 1290) was a Hungarian lord in the 13th century, who served as Master of the cupbearers in 1263 and from 1270 to 1272. He was the progenitor of the influential Kórógyi family.

== Early life ==
Philip (III) was born in the late 1210s or early 1220s into the prestigious Kórógyi family, which possessed landholdings mostly in southern Transdanubia and northern Slavonia. His parents were Keled (or Cletus) Kórógyi and a certain noblewoman Macha from unknown family. Philip had two brothers – Ladislaus (I) and Gregory – and an unidentified sister, who married Vincent Báncsa.

His father Keled and his cousins – the daughters of his late uncle Philip (II) – were killed during the first Mongol invasion of Hungary in 1241. Philip and his brothers were adults by that time. They belonged to the royal escort of King Béla IV of Hungary, who fled to the Dalmatian coast during the Mongols' invasion. Prior to the Mongol invasion, Philip (II) died without male descendants. Béla IV donated his estates, including Orljavac in Požega County to his brother Keled for his faithful service. With the king's consent, Keled bequeathed half portion of Orljavac to his son-in-law Vincent Báncsa. After Philip's daughters filed a complaint, Keled gave them the estate in exchange for compensating Vincent with 100 marks. After the withdrawal of the Mongols, the lawsuit was settled in October 1243; Keled's widow, Macha and her sons – Ladislaus, Philip and Gregory – declared before the cathedral chapter of Pécs that they would give up their share of the property (half portion of Orljavac) in favor of Vincent in exchange for 100 marks, and that they were ready to sell the other half to him for 60 marks. The Hungarian monarch approved the transaction in March 1244.

Béla IV confirmed all donations that he made in favor of the late Keled to his sons in 1256, since the previous royal charters were destroyed during the Mongol invasion. Philip and his brothers paid the daughters' quarter to their aunt Chen in exchange for her land Szentiván (present-day a borough of Čepinski Martinci) in 1259. The Kórógyi brothers were represented by Thomas Miskolc in the lawsuit.

== Career ==
For their faithful service, especially during the Mongol invasion, Ladislaus, Philip and Gregory were granted the lands Kos, Dombró and Csapa in Valkó County by Béla IV in August 1258. These possessions were removed from the jurisdiction of the castle of Vukovar with this act. By that time, Philip was a confidant of Queen Maria Laskarina. In this capacity, he served as ispán of Požega County from 1259 to 1266, and thus he plausibly supported Béla IV in the internal war against his son Duke Stephen. Simultaneously, Philip was referred to as Master of the cupbearers by royal charters in 1263. He was succeeded by Peter Káta in this position sometime around 1264–1268. Philip also served as ispán of Valkó County – which then belonged to the realm of Béla, Duke of Slavonia – from 1265 or 1266 to 1267. Philip and his brothers built their stronghold at Kórógy (present-day Korođ, Croatia) sometime in the 1250s or 1260s; the Kórógyi family then adopted its surname after the fort.

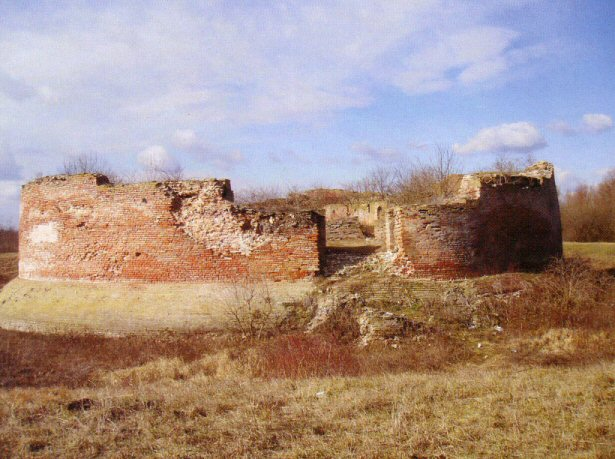
The ruins of the castle of Korođ (Kórógy) in Croatia, built by Philip and his brothers after the Mongol invasion

Stephen V ascended the Hungarian throne following the death of his father in 1270. The new monarch sought to reconcile with Béla's former barons, who had not invested themselves heavily in the civil war. Upon the request of Philip and his brothers, Stephen transcribed and confirmed his father's aforementioned donation regarding Kos, Dombró and Csapa already in 1270. It is plausible that Stephen V considered that Philip could be a key ally and mainstay in his power in Slavonia. Accordingly, Philip was appointed Master of the cupbearers. He held the dignity until the death of Stephen V in August 1272. Beside that he also administered Doboka County for a very brief period in the latter year, when the ailing monarch reorganized the government after the kidnapping of his son.

Philip lost political influence during the era of feudal anarchy, which characterized the reign of Ladislaus IV. He and his brothers bought the estate Koromszó in Tolna County (present-day a borough of Máza in Baranya County) from Emeric Csák for 100 marks in 1276. In an unidentified year (possibly around 1275), Philip and his brothers had a lawsuit against Apaj (II) Gutkeled over the rightful possession of Nezde and Kőröshegy in Somogy County (southern Balaton). Prior to 1290, the three brothers divided their inherited landholdings among themselves. When Gregory, who suffered from severe gout, made his last will and testament in that year, he bequeathed Orljavac with its castle to his daughter Yolanda (the spouse of Ladislaus Nevnai), while Kos, Apáti (Opatovac), Kórógy (with its castle), Csapa, Lippó, Zeeeya and Szava were inherited by Ladislaus and Philip, his brothers. Philip died sometime after 1290, possibly prior to 1293, when his sons first appear in contemporary documents.

== Descendants ==
Philip had four sons – Lawrence (I), Philip (V), Ladislaus (III) and Demetrius (II) – from his marriage with an unidentified noblewoman. His eldest son Lawrence was a courtier of queen mother Tomasina Morosini in the 1290s. The senior branch of the Kórógyi family, which provided several barons of the realm and flourished until its extinction in 1472, descended from Lawrence. Philip's other sons had no known offspring. A lesser branch of the Kórógyis, also known as the Szeglaki (or Kosi) family descended from Philip's brother Ladislaus (I).

== Sources ==
- Wertner, Mór (1892). "Családtörténeti adalékok. Az első Kórógyiak [Family History Additions. The First Kórógyis]". Turul (in Hungarian). 10: 166–172. ISSN 1216-7258.
- Zsoldos, Attila (2007). Családi ügy: IV. Béla és István ifjabb király viszálya az 1260-as években [A family affair: The Conflict between Béla IV and Junior King Stephen in the 1260s] (in Hungarian). História, MTA Történettudományi Intézete. ISBN 978-963-9627-15-4.
- Zsoldos, Attila (2011). Magyarország világi archontológiája, 1000–1301 [Secular Archontology of Hungary, 1000–1301] (in Hungarian). História, MTA Történettudományi Intézete. ISBN 978-963-9627-38-3.

Philip III House of Kórógyi Born: ? Died: after 1290
Political offices
Preceded by Conrad Győr	Master of the cupbearers 1263	Succeeded by Peter Káta
Preceded by James Bána	Master of the cupbearers 1270–1272	Succeeded by Lawrence
