= Turnu (disambiguation) =

Turnu (Romanian for "the tower") may refer to several places in Romania:

- Turnu Măgurele, a town in Teleorman County
- Turnu, a village in Pecica town, Arad County
- Turnu Roșu, a commune in Sibiu County
- Turnu Ruieni, a commune in Caraș-Severin County
- Drobeta-Turnu Severin, a city in Mehedinți County
