= Sebeș (Timiș) =

- Location within Romania

Location
- Country: Romania
- Counties: Caraș-Severin County
- Villages: Borlova, Turnu Ruieni, Zervești, Caransebeș

Physical characteristics
- Source: Muntele Mic
- Mouth: Timiș
  - location: Caransebeș
  - coordinates: 45°24′30″N 22°12′45″E
- Length: 30 km (19 mi)
- Basin size: 147 km^{2} (57 sq mi)

Basin features
- Progression: Timiș→ Danube→ Black Sea
- Tributaries
  - right: Sebeșel, Borlova, Slatina, Mâloasa

The Sebeș is a right tributary of the river Timiș in Romania. It discharges into the Timiș in Caransebeș. Its length is 30 km (19 mi) and its basin size is 147 km^{2} (57 sq mi).. The name of the river originates from the Hungarian adjective sebes meaning "speedy".
