= Emeric Csák =

Hungarian nobleman

Ispán of Somogy
- Reign: 1272–1273
- Predecessor: Ernye Ákos
- Successor: Mojs
- Born: after 1228
- Died: after 1276
- Noble family: gens Csák
- Father: Stephen
- Mother: N Győr

Emeric from the kindred Csák (Hungarian: Csák nembeli Imre; died after 1276) was a Hungarian lord in the 13th century, who served as ispán of Somogy County from 1272 to 1273.

== Life and career ==
Emeric was born into an unidentified branch of the powerful and wealthy gens (clan) Csák, as the son of Stephen Csák and an unidentified granddaughter of the influential baron Pat Győr. His parents got married around 1228, consequently Emeric was born thereafter. His father Stephen was a confidant of Béla IV of Hungary since the 1220s and held several court dignities in the upcoming decades. Emeric had no known siblings nor descendants.

His father Stephen died sometime after 1269 or 1270. Emeric inherited his estates which mostly laid in Baranya County. After the minor Ladislaus IV ascended the Hungarian throne, Emeric was appointed ispán of Somogy County in September 1272. He held the office until 12 May 1273, when he was replaced by Mojs, a confidant of Queen Elizabeth the Cuman. Emeric sold his inherited estate Koromszó in Tolna County (present-day a borough of Máza in Baranya County) to the Kórógyi family in December 1276.

== Sources ==
- Karácsonyi, János (1901). A magyar nemzetségek a XIV. század közepéig. I. kötet [The Hungarian genera until the middle of the 14th century, Vol. 1] (in Hungarian). Hungarian Academy of Sciences.
- Zsoldos, Attila (2011). Magyarország világi archontológiája, 1000–1301 [Secular Archontology of Hungary, 1000–1301] (in Hungarian). História, MTA Történettudományi Intézete. ISBN 978-963-9627-38-3.

Emeric Genus Csák Born: after 1228 Died: after 1276
Political offices
Preceded by Ernye Ákos	Ispán of Somogy; 1272–1273	Succeeded by Mojs
