= Ladislaus Kórógyi =

Hungarian bishop

- Bishop of Pécs
- Province: Esztergom
- Diocese: Pécs
- Appointed: 1314
- Term ended: 1345
- Predecessor: Peter I
- Successor: Nicholas Neszmélyi

Personal details
- Died: 1345
- Denomination: Roman Catholic

Ladislaus Kórógyi (Hungarian: Kórógyi László) was bishop of Pécs in the Kingdom of Hungary from 1314 to his death in 1345. He assisted King Charles I of Hungary by force against his opponents, but later he lost royal favor because he energically protected the interests of the Church and his diocese in the Kingdom of Hungary. He actively developed his bishopric's properties, for instance, by inviting colonists to Mohács and Pécs.

== Life ==
=== Early career ===
Ladislaus Kórógyi was the fourth son of his namesake father, a wealthy nobleman by his second wife. His family's properties were located in the counties of Baranya, Pozsega, Tolna and Valkó. He was first mentioned as a cleric in 1296, and as a canon at the cathedral chapter of Pécs in 1300. Bishop Peter I of Pécs appointed Ladislaus provost of the cathedral chapter at his see. However, both the bishop and his provost were prevented from entering their seat by Nicholas, cantor of the chapter who disputed the validity of Bishop Peter's appointment to bishopric. Ladislaus Kórógyi could only enter his office in June 1310, when the first document under his name was issued by the cathedral chapter.

=== Bishop of Pécs ===
The canons of the cathedral chapter elected Ladislaus bishop of Pécs after the death of Bishop Peter who died in the first half of 1314. The earliest mention of his bishopric is dated to January 17, 1315. He personally assisted King Charles I against the rebelling Kőszegi family in the counties of Baranya and Tolna from April to July 1316, and against the powerful Matthew III Csák in the siege of Komárom (Komárno, Slovakia) in October 1317. However, the peace concluded between the monarch and Matthew Csák scandalized the prelates, because it failed to dispose over the damages caused by the oligarch to them. They held an assembly in Kalocsa in February 1318. Here Thomas, the archbishop of Esztergom and his suffragan bishops appointed Ladislaus Kórógyi to express all their grievances, including the taxation of Church properties, to the monarch.

Ladislaus Kórógyi was also often appointed by the popes to proceed on behalf of the Holy See with King Charles I who frequently took advantage of vacancies in Church offices in order to seize their income for himself. For instance, Pope John XXII appointed Bishop Ladislaus one of the administrators of the Archdiocese of Esztergom. No doubt, Bishop Ladislaus was one of the authors of an anonymous letter sent in 1338 by Hungarian prelates to the pope which listed their complaints against King Charles I. The monarch in his turn wrote a letter to the pope in order to prevent the appointment of Ladislaus Kórógyi to the archbishopric of Kalocsa. His relationship with the monarch deteriorated to such an extent, that there is no reference to his presence at the royal court after 1330. King Charles I even confiscated the fortresses of Kórógy (Korog, Croatia) and Mecseknádasd and the properties attached to them from the bishop's family. Although Bishop Ladislaus and one of his nephews received some compensation from the monarch, he transferred half of his lands to his relatives.

Bishop Ladislaus invited "guest settlers" to Mohács and granted autonomy to them. He even brought an action against the convent at Somlóvásárhely on the possession of a land near Mohács. He also settled German colonists in Pécs. Although Bishop Ladislaus confirmed the exemption from the tithes of the monastery of Saint James Hill at Pécs, he disputed (in vain) the same status of the Paulines and the Knights Hospitaller in his diocese. However, he succeeded in strengthening his position against the collegiate chapter of Požega whose canons tried to dispute his supervisory right. Three years before his death, Bishop Ladislaus also convinced King Charles I's son and successor, King Louis I of Hungary to return the properties confiscated in the reign of the king's father to his family.

Ladislaus Kórógyi Born: c. 1280 Died: 1345
Catholic Church titles
Preceded by Peter I	Bishop of Pécs; 1314–1345	Succeeded by Nicholas I
