= Hungarian occupation of Vidin =

Aspect of Hungarian history

Banate of Bulgaria Bolgár bánság Banatus Bulgariae
- Banate of the Kingdom of Hungary
- 1365–1369
- Capital: Bodony
- History
  - Established: 1365
  - Disestablished: 1369
Preceded by	Succeeded by
Tsardom of Vidin	Tsardom of Vidin
- Today part of: Bulgaria

The Hungarian occupation of Vidin was a period in the history of the city and region of Vidin (Hungarian: Bodony), today in northwestern Bulgaria, when it was called Banate of Bulgaria under the rule of King Louis I of Hungary from 1365 to 1369.

== Brief war ==
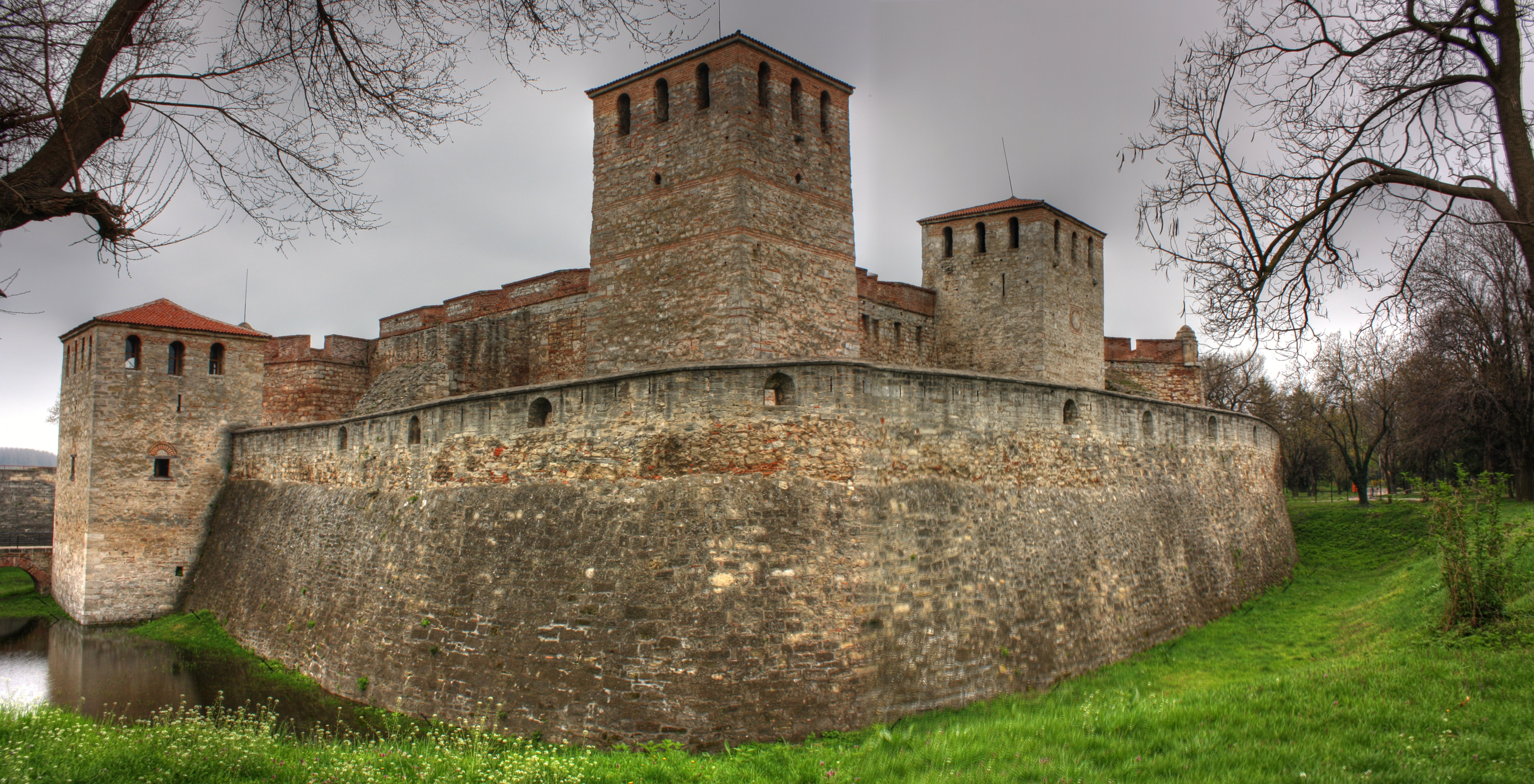
Baba Vida, Vidin's medieval fortress

Before 1359–1360, the former heir to the Bulgarian crown Ivan Sratsimir had established himself as the ruler of the Vidin appanage of the Second Bulgarian Empire and had turned it into a largely independent entity. In early 1365 Louis I of Hungary, who like his predecessors styled himself "king of Bulgaria" (rex Bulgariae) among other titles, demanded that Ivan Sratsimir acknowledge his suzerainty and become his vassal. After Sratsimir's refusal, the Hungarian king undertook a campaign to conquer the Tsardom of Vidin.

On 16 May 1365, Louis set off from Hungary. He crossed into Sratsimir's territory near Orșova, capturing several fortresses. The Hungarians defeated a Jasz detachment under the walls of Vidin, forcing them back into the castle. The siege began on 30 May and the city was captured on 2 June after a single assault. Although short, the siege was intense. The Austrian poet Peter Suchenwirt dedicated a poem on the siege to a participant, Count Ulrich Iof Celje, in which he laments the great number of the dead. Surviving royal charters show that Louis rewarded several participating noblemen with land.

The Hungarians took Ivan Sratsimir and his family captive and imprisoned them in the Humnik fortress in Bosiljevo, Croatia. Shortly afterwards, the Hungarians seized the entire land of the Tsardom of Vidin (known as Bodony in Hungarian) and turned it into a province of the Kingdom of Hungary governed by a ban. Initially, the area was governed by Peter Himfi, the Count of Pozsony, and then by Denis Lackfi, styled "voivode of Transylvania, governor of Vidin and ruler of the counties of Temes and Szolnok".

== Hungarian rule in Vidin ==
After establishing their administrative rule, the Hungarians proceeded to convert the local Bulgarian Orthodox population to Roman Catholicism with the assistance of Franciscan friars. Despite its short duration, this was one of the earliest Hungarian missionary dioceses. According to Hungarian data, the Franciscans converted 200,000 people or a third of the region's population; although the figure is considered grossly overestimated and unrealistic, among the converted were certainly Ivan Sratsimir and his royal family. That religious intolerance was reflected in the negative popular attitude towards the Hungarian overlordship, attested in a marginal note in an Orthodox religious book from the period: "This book was written by the sinful and unintelligent Dragan together with his brother Rayko in the days when the Hungarians ruled Vidin and it was great pain for the people at that time."

Ivan Sratsimir's father, Tsar Ivan Alexander, ruler of Bulgaria at Tarnovo, could do nothing to stop the Hungarian invasion and his son's capture. Several years later, however, he took advantage of Byzantine Emperor John V Palaiologos' detention at Vidin and Count of Savoy Amadeus VI's campaign on the Bulgarian Black Sea Coast to organize an Orthodox coalition and salvage Vidin. For joining the alliance, Ivan Alexander offered the Byzantine emperor the Black Sea ports south of Nesebar (Messembria); in return, however, John V had to pay 180,000 florins to Vladislav I Vlaicu, voivode of Wallachia. The Vlach voivode would, in return, seize Vidin and cede it to Ivan Alexander.

== End of the banate ==
In 1369, the Hungarian occupation of Vidin was brought to an end. Early that year, Vladislav Vlaicu seized the city after he had defeated a Hungarian army the previous year. The voivode held Vidin until the summer of 1369, when the successful campaign of King Louis made him accept Hungarian suzerainty and start negotiations. The ensuing negotiations between the Kingdom of Hungary and Ivan Alexander's allies, Vladislav I Vlaicu and Dobrotitsa, the despot of the semi-independent Dobrujan Principality of Karvuna, led to the return of the city to Bulgarian possession. It is thought that Ivan Sratsimir was reinstalled as the region's ruler in the autumn of 1369.

== List of bans ==
Term	Incumbent	Notes	Source
1365–1366	Emeric Lackfi	captain of Vidin; also Master of the Horse (1359–1367), castellan of Miháld and Karánsebes castles (1365–1366)	
1365–1366	Denis Lackfi	captain of Vidin; also Voivode of Transylvania (1359–1367) and ispán of Temes County (1365–1367)	
1366–1369	Benedict Himfi	together with Ladislaus Kórógyi (1366–1368); also ispán of Temes (1366–1369), Krassó and Keve Counties (1366–1367). His deputy was his younger brother, Peter Himfi	
1366–1368	Ladislaus Kórógyi	together with Benedict Himfi (1366–1369)	

== Bibliography ==
- Божилов, Иван (1994). "Иван Срацимир, цар във Видин (1352/1353 — 1396)". Фамилията на Асеневци (1186–1460). Генеалогия и просопография (in Bulgarian). София: Българска академия на науките. ISBN 954-430-264-6. OCLC 38087158.
- (in Hungarian) Engel, Pál (1996). Magyarország világi archontológiája, 1301–1457, I. ("Secular Archontology of Hungary, 1301–1457, Volume I"). História, MTA Történettudományi Intézete. Budapest. ISBN 963-8312-44-0.
- Ioniță, Adrian; Kelemen, Beatrice; Simon, Alexandru (2017). AL WA: Prințul Negru al Vlahiei și vremurile sale [AL WA: The Black Prince of Wallachia and his times] (in Romanian). Cluj-Napoca: Academia Română - Centrul de Studii Transilvane, Editura Argonaut. ISBN 9786068694719 – via Academia.edu.
- Kristó, Gyula (1988). Az Anjou-kor háborúi [Wars in the Age of the Angevins] (in Hungarian). Zrínyi Kiadó. ISBN 9633269059.
- (in Hungarian) Markó, László (2006). A magyar állam főméltóságai Szent Istvántól napjainkig: Életrajzi Lexikon ("Great Officers of State in Hungary from King Saint Stephen to Our Days: A Biographical Encyclopedia"). 2nd edition, Helikon Kiadó. ISBN 963-547-085-1
- Solymosi, László; Körmendi, Adrienne (1981). "A középkori magyar állam virágzása és bukása, 1301–1506 [The Heyday and Fall of the Medieval Hungarian State, 1301–1526]". In Solymosi, László (ed.). Magyarország történeti kronológiája, I: a kezdetektől 1526-ig [Historical Chronology of Hungary, Volume I: From the Beginning to 1526] (in Hungarian). Budapest: Akadémiai Kiadó. pp. 188–228. ISBN 978-963-05-2661-6. OCLC 313143718.
