= Réka Castle =

Réka Castle Réka vár
- Location of Réka Castle
- Coordinates: 46.2221°N 18.4313°E
- Country: Hungary
- County: Baranya

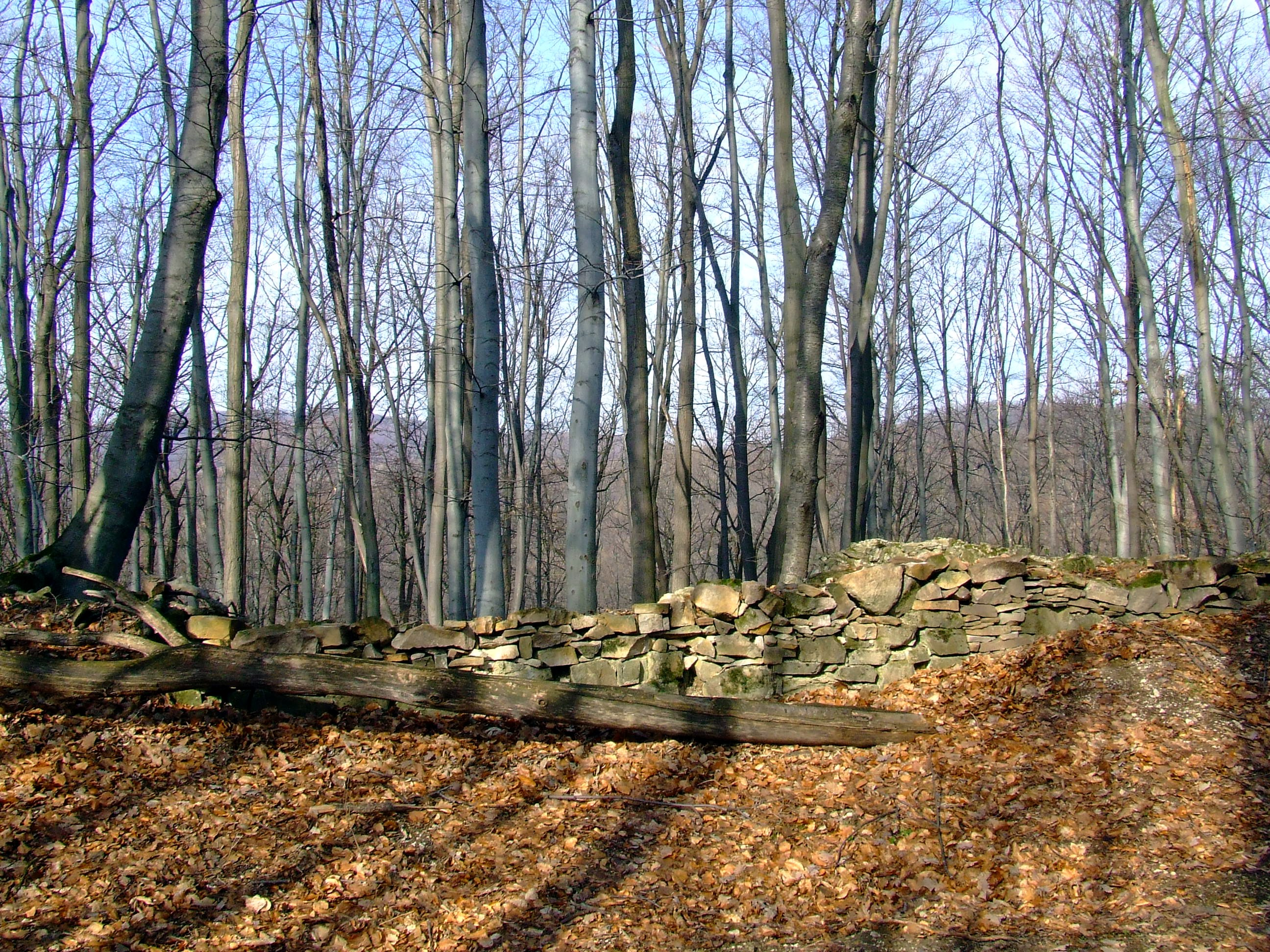
Remains of Réka Castle in Mecsek

Réka Castle (Hungarian: Rékavára or Réka vár); is a ruined castle in Baranya county, Hungary. It has been identified as the possible place of refuge for members of the royal family of England in the mid 11th century.

The ruins of Réka Castle are near Mecseknádasd, on a hilltop marked with a cross, towards the opening to Old Mine's Valley (Óbányai-völgy).

== History ==
According to local folklore, Prince Edward, son of Edmund Ironside, King of England, arrived in Hungary during the reign of St Stephen. Edward was given an estate called Terra Britanorum de Nadasd, which contained Réka Castle. His children, born in Hungary, were Saint Margaret of Scotland, Edgar the Ætheling and Cristina.

A deed of gift issued by Andrew II in 1235 gave land bordering this territory to the Roman Catholic Diocese of Pécs.

== Construction ==
According to experts, the approximately 200-metre long and 36-metre wide courtyard was surrounded by a 3-metre thick stone wall. The round tower foundations discovered in the excavations are probably remnants of the guards' posts. The central section of the courtyard was enclosed by a row of buildings behind which there was a 10-metre-wide ditch along the side of the outer castle. This row was presumably single-storey with a shingled roof. The remnants of a multi-storey tower were uncovered on the side of the outer castle. The precise time of its construction is still under debate. It is thought to be of Illyrian or Celtic origins or rooted in the later 9th-century Frankish architecture. The first charter referring to the castle dates from 1309. The circumstances of its destruction are unknown (The castle was possibly burnt down in the Turkish age (16th-17th century)). The locals took what was left of it to build homes and mills.
