= Samatovci =

- Village (Selo)
- Location within Osijek-Baranja County Location within Croatia
- Coordinates: 45°36′N 18°30′E
- Country: Croatia
- County: Osijek-Baranja County

Area
  - Total: 2.3 sq mi (6.0 km^{2})

Population (2021)
  - Total: 509
  - Density: 220/sq mi (85/km^{2})
- Time zone: UTC+1 (CET)
  - Summer (DST): UTC+2 (CEST)

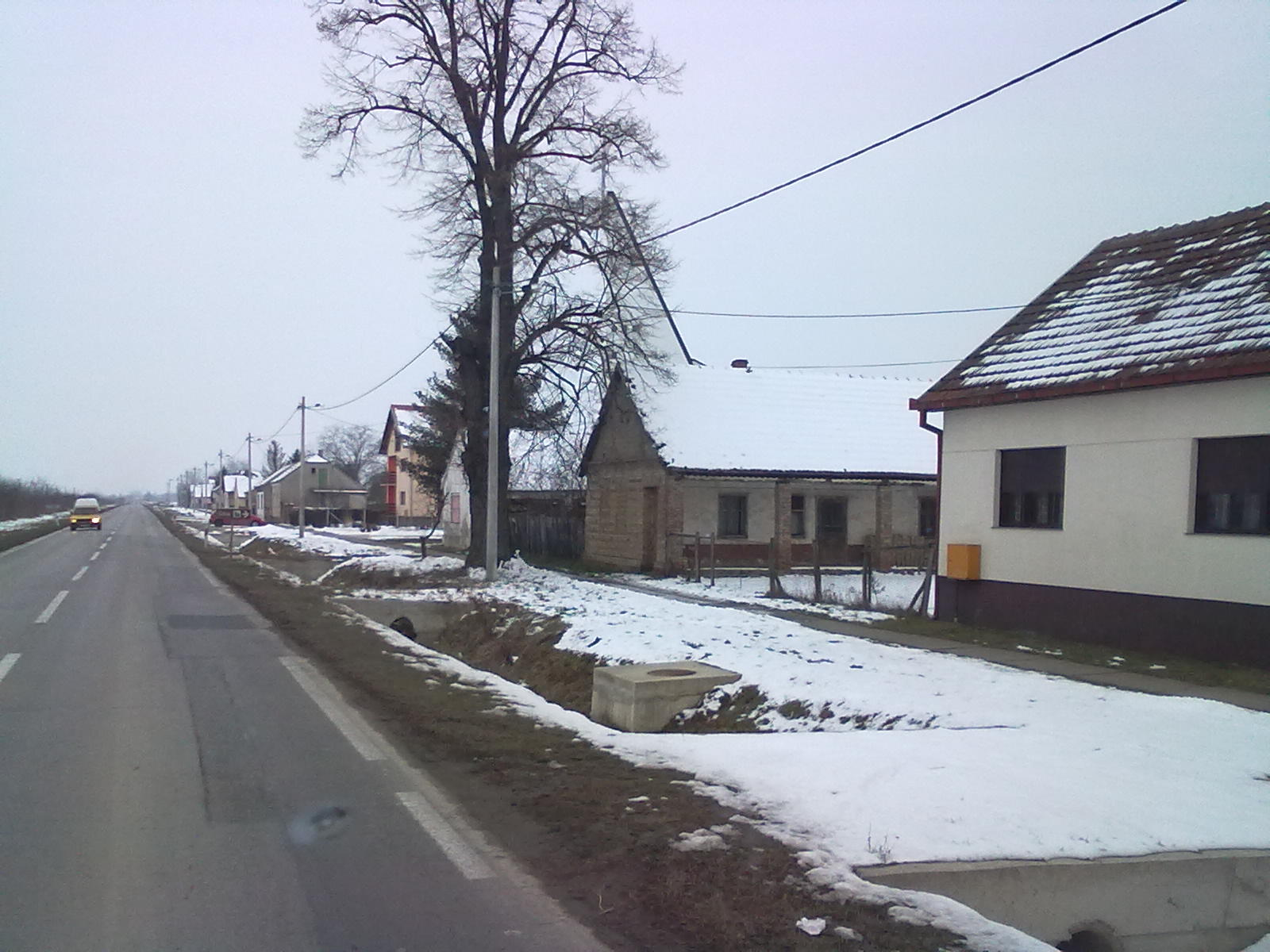
A picture of Samatovci, Croatia

Samatovci is a village near Bizovac, Croatia. It is connected by the D2 highway.

== Name ==
The name of the village in Croatian is plural.
