= Korođ =

Korođ Kórógy (Hungarian) Korog
- Village (Selo)
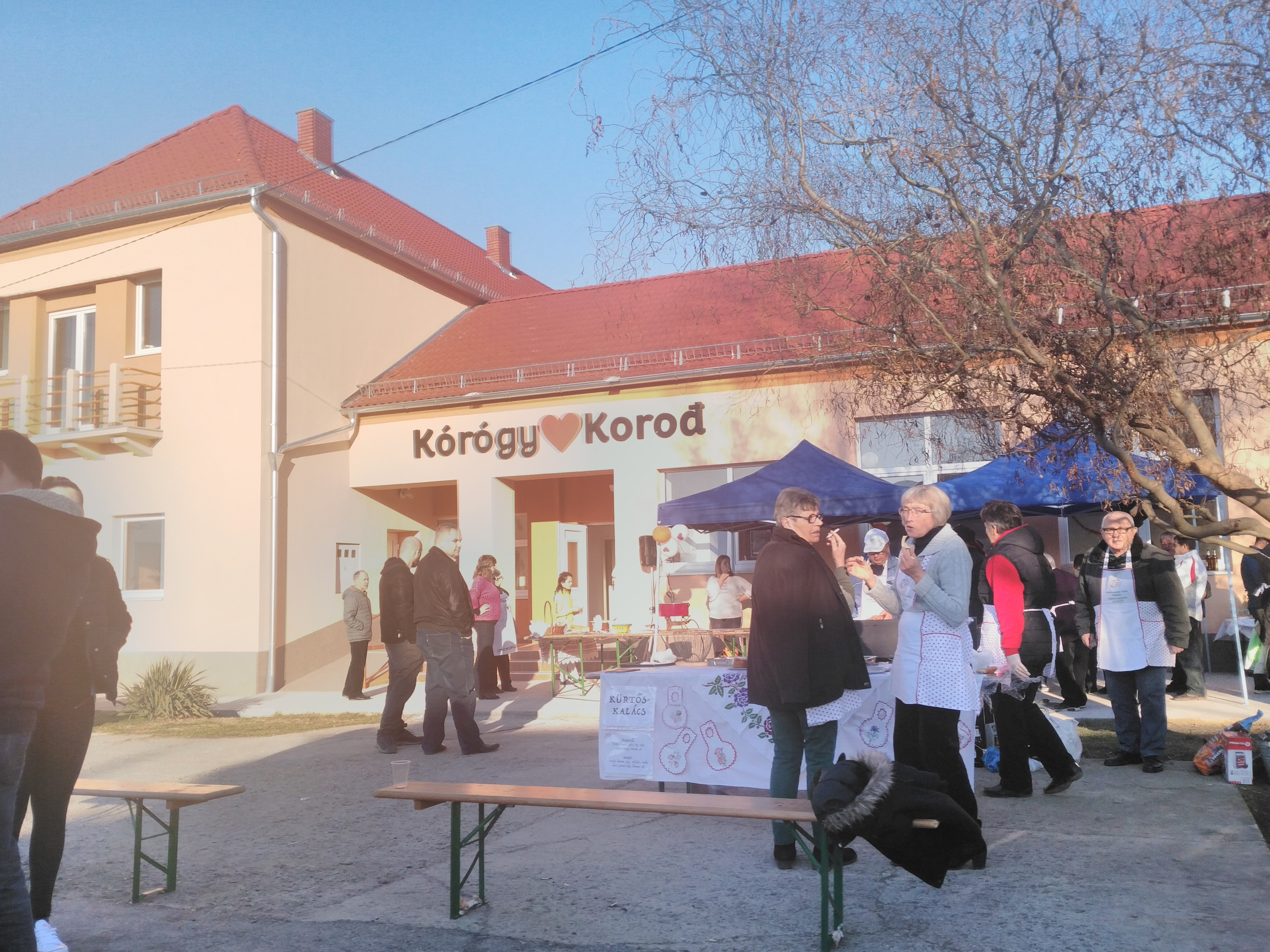

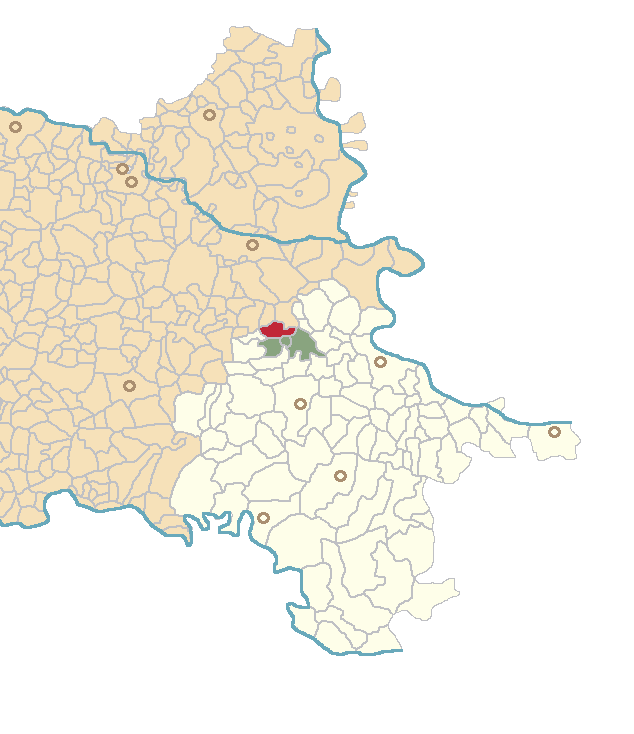

- Location of Korođ in Croatia Korođ (Croatia) Korođ (Europe)
- Coordinates: 45°25′N 18°45′E
- Country: Croatia
- County: Vukovar-Syrmia
- Municipality: Tordinci

Area
  - Total: 13.8 km^{2} (5.3 sq mi)

Population (2021)
  - Total: 406
  - Density: 29.4/km^{2} (76.2/sq mi)
- Time zone: UTC+1 (CET)
  - Summer (DST): UTC+2 (CEST)
- Vehicle registration: VK

Korođ or Korog (Hungarian: Kórógy) is a village in the municipality of Tordinci, Vukovar-Syrmia County, Croatia. Korođ is one of the oldest Hungarian settlements in the area of present day Croatia dating back at least to some time before 1290 when the fortification was constructed at this spot. The village is named after Hungarian noble family of Kórógyi. Only 2 out of 274 male over 21 years were recognised their right to vote at the 1920 Kingdom of Serbs, Croats and Slovenes Constitutional Assembly election with the same practice continuing at the 1923 elections.

== History ==
Following Ottoman retreat from the region, the Lordship of Vukovar was established, and the village became part of its domain in 1725.

== See also ==
- Hungarians of Croatia

== Sources ==
- Barišić Bogišić, Lidija (2022). O neslavenskom stanovništvu na vukovarskom području. Hrvatska sveučilišna naklada. p. 134. ISBN 978-953-169-497-1.
