= Szava =

- Village (Falva)
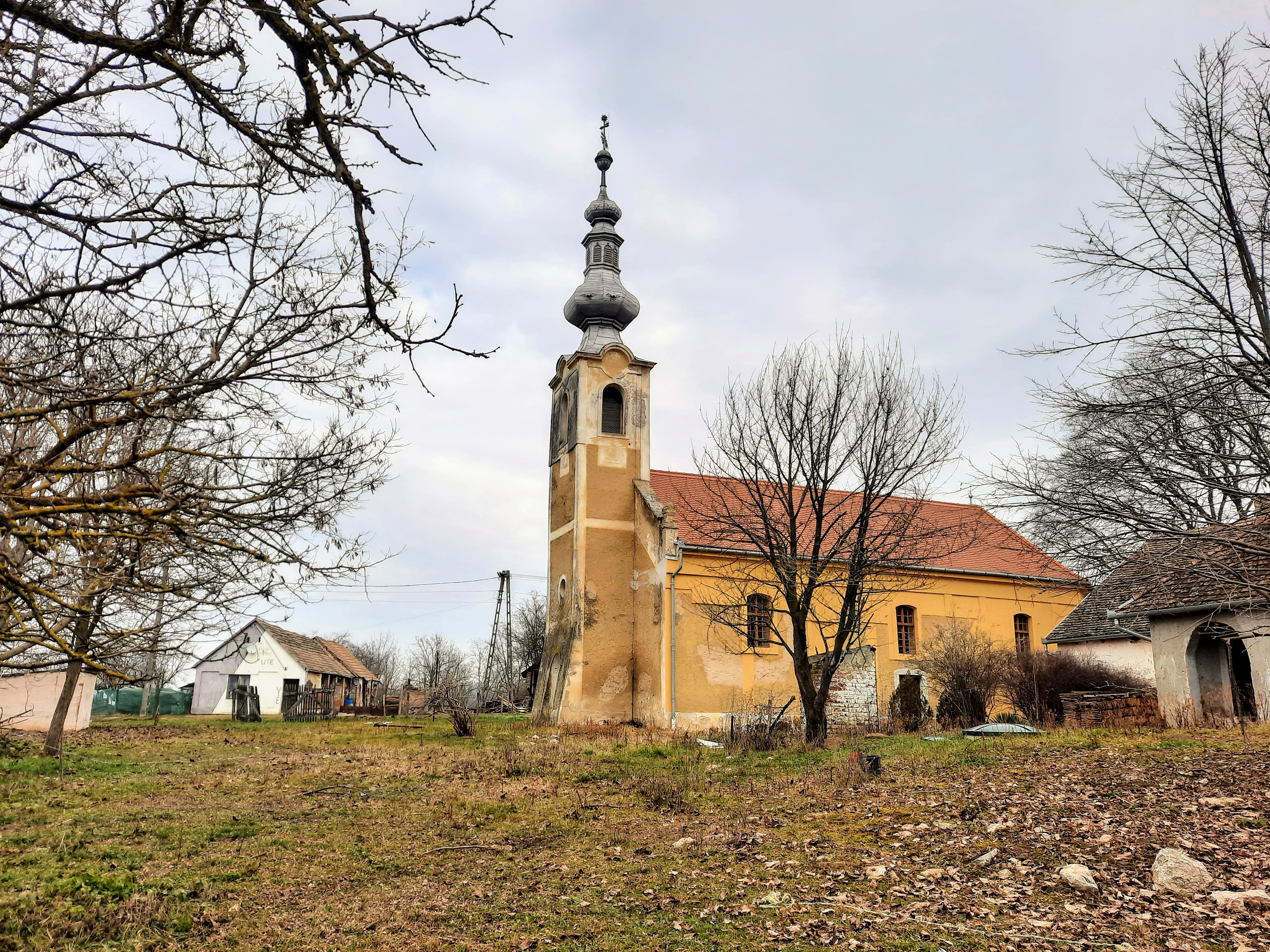

- Location of Baranya county in Hungary

- Location of Szava
- Coordinates: 45.9024°N 18.17621°E
- Country: Hungary
- County: Baranya

Area
  - Total: 12.64 km^{2} (4.88 sq mi)

Population (2004)
  - Total: 362
  - Density: 28.63/km^{2} (74.2/sq mi)
- Time zone: UTC+1 (CET)
  - Summer (DST): UTC+2 (CEST)
- Postal code: 7813
- Area code: 72

Szava is a village in Baranya county, Hungary.
