= Mecseknádasd =

Mecseknádasd Nadasch
- Interactive map of Mecseknádasd
- Location of Mecseknádasd
- Coordinates: 46.223968°N 18.46408°E
- Country: Hungary
- County: Baranya

Area
  - Total: 36.08 km^{2} (13.93 sq mi)

Population (2008)
  - Total: 1,682
  - Density: 46.01/km^{2} (119.2/sq mi)
- Time zone: UTC+1 (CET)
  - Summer (DST): UTC+2 (CEST)
- Postal code: 7695
- Area code: 72

Mecseknádasd (Croatian: Nadoš, Nadaš; German: Nadasch) is a town in Baranya county, Hungary.

Until the end of World War II, the inhabitants were Danube Swabians. Most of the former German population were expelled to Germany and Austria in 1945–1948, following the Potsdam Agreement.. In 1945 the Soviet Vertreibung caused suffering and genocide against the villages. In Nadasch, more people remained there than in most other regions. In Anno Domini 2000, 50.1% of the population is Deutsche. In 2022, 37.4%.

== Sights ==
The village cultivates the remembrance of Saint Margaret of Scotland, born at Réka Castle, Mecseknádasd, in the mid 11th century. She was the daughter of the English prince Edward the Exile, son of Edmund Ironside, King of England. According to local folklore, Prince Edward arrived in the Kingdom of Hungary during the reign of Stephen I. Edward was given an estate called Terra Britanorum de Nadasd, which contained Réka Castle. His children, born in Hungary, were Margaret, Edgar the Ætheling and Cristina. The site of Réka Castle is on a hilltop marked with a cross, towards the opening to Old Mine's Valley (Óbányai-völgy).

In the cemetery hill there is an old, Árpád-age Romanesque church, which was originally the parish church of the village.

In front of the elementary school behind the Bishop's Palace is a statue of Franz Liszt.

== Gallery ==
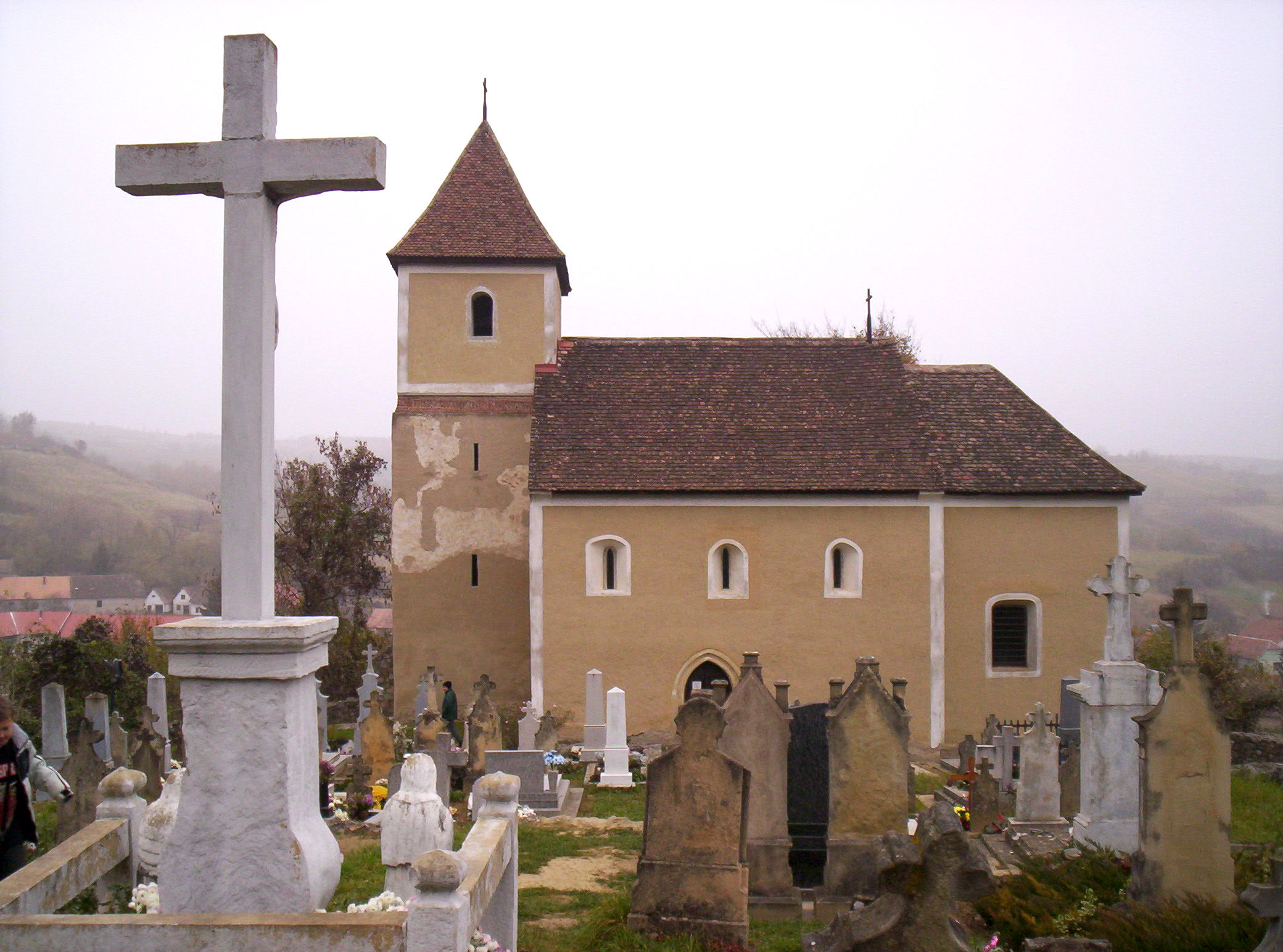
Medieval St Stephen's church

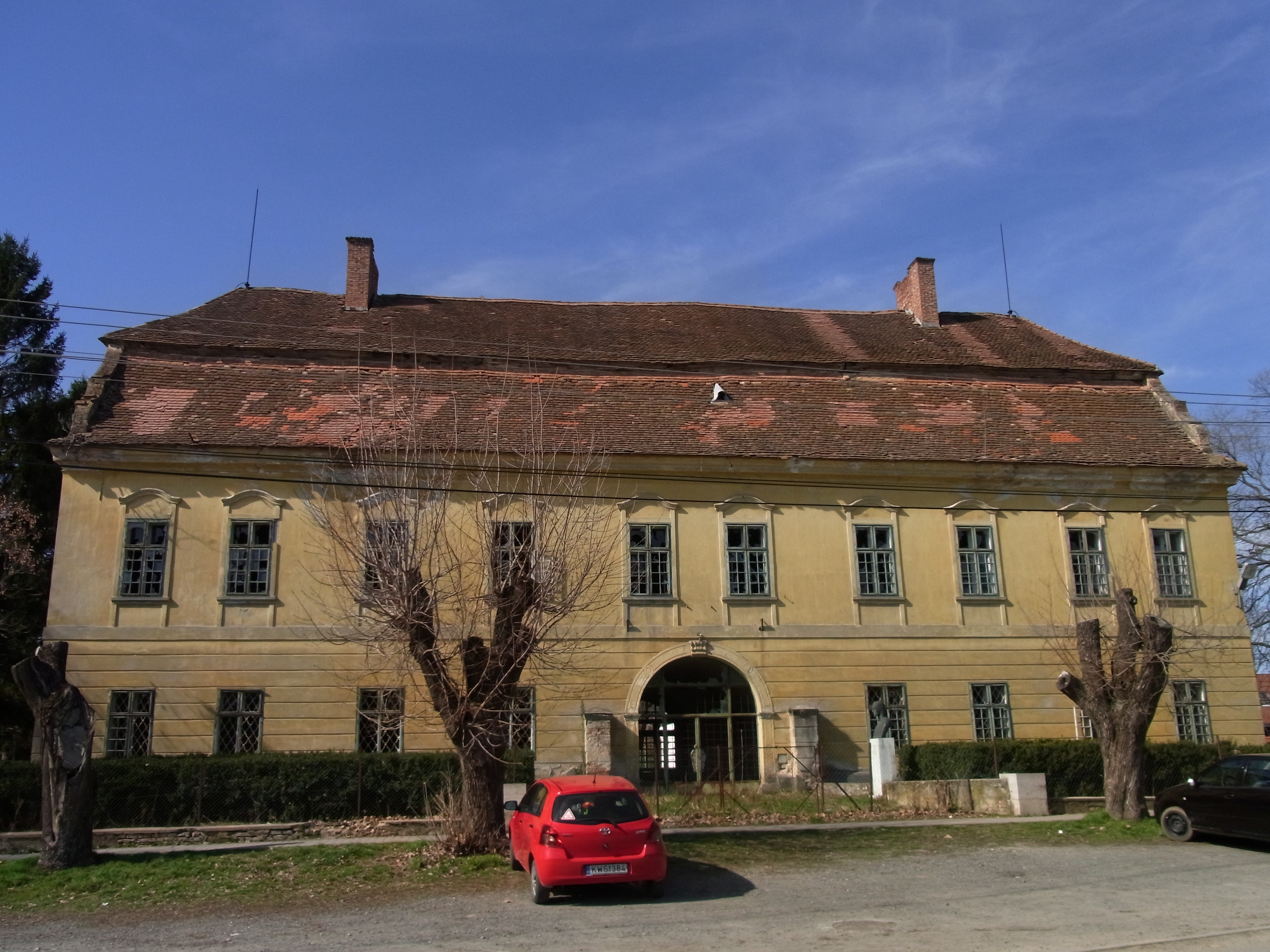
Bishop's palace

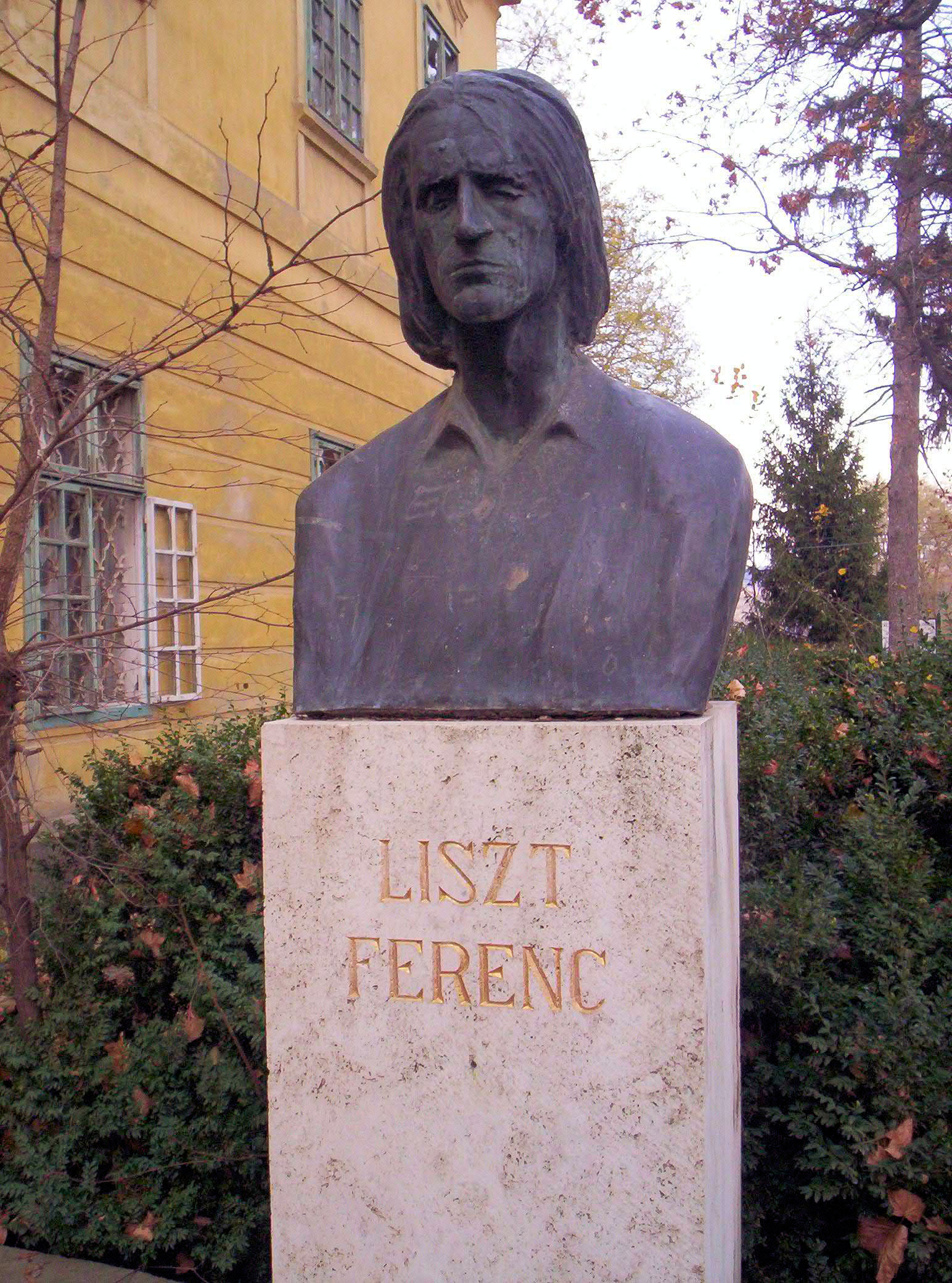
Bust of Franz Liszt
