= Máza =

- Village
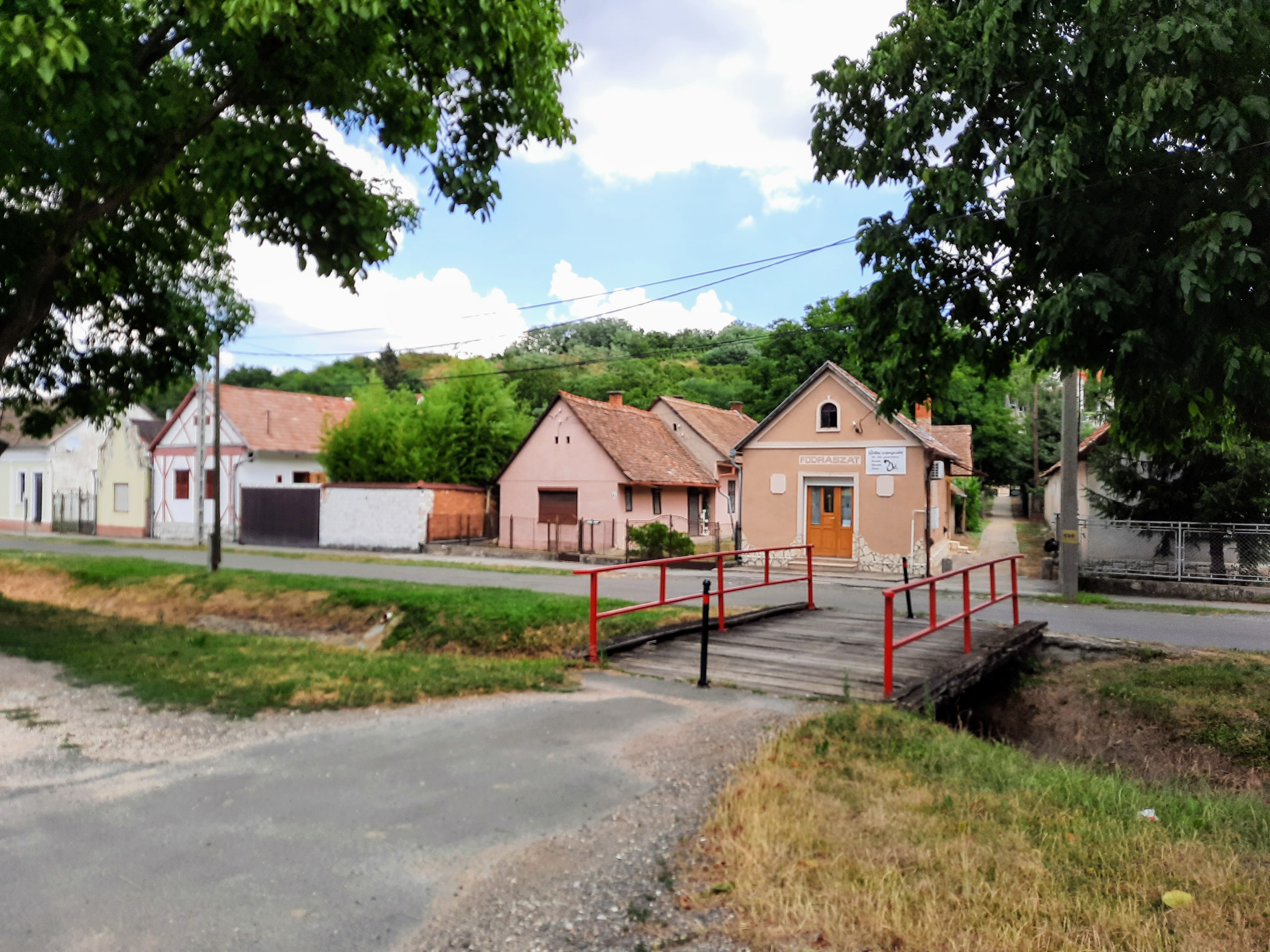
- Interactive map of Máza
- Coordinates: 46°16′N 18°24′E
- Country: Hungary
- County: Baranya

Population (2025)
  - Total: 1,089
- Time zone: UTC+1 (CET)
  - Summer (DST): UTC+2 (CEST)

Máza is a village in Baranya county, Hungary.
