= Turnu Ruieni =

- Commune
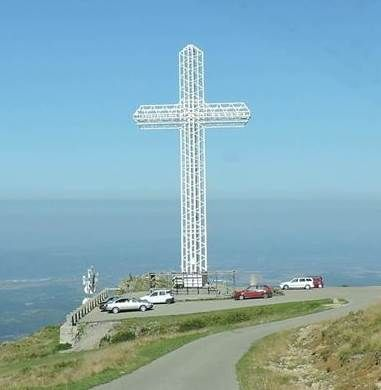
- Heroes Cross on Muntele Mic

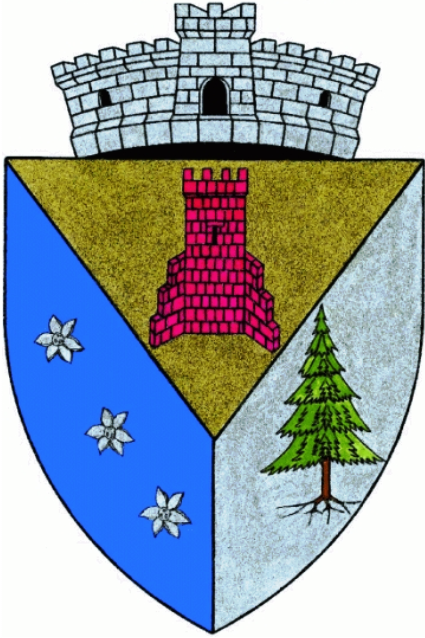
- Coat of arms

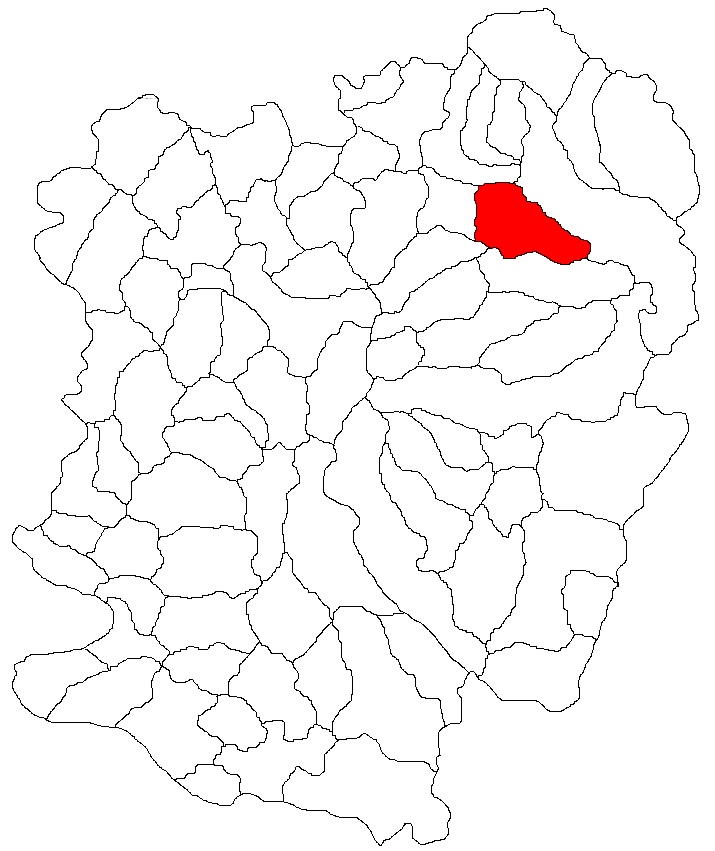
- Location in Caraș-Severin County

- Location in Romania
- Coordinates: 45°23′N 22°20′E
- Country: Romania
- County: Caraș-Severin

Government
  - Mayor (2020–2024): Mihuți-Cosmin Belci (PNL)
- Area: 160.91 km^{2} (62.13 sq mi)
- Elevation: 305 m (1,001 ft)
- Population (2021-12-01): 3,131
  - Density: 19.46/km^{2} (50.40/sq mi)
- Time zone: UTC+02:00 (EET)
  - Summer (DST): UTC+03:00 (EEST)
- Postal code: 327405
- Area code: (+40) 02 55
- Vehicle reg.: CS
- Website: www.comuna-turnuruieni.ro

Turnu Ruieni (Hungarian: Sebesrom) is a commune in Caraș-Severin County, western Romania with a population of 3,131 people as of 2021. It is composed of six villages: Borlova (Borló), Cicleni (Csiklény), Dalci (Dálcs), Turnu Ruieni, Zervești (Szervesd), and Zlagna (Szalakna). Turnu Ruieni is situated in the historical region of Banat.
