= John IV Kórógyi =

Hungarian lord

John (IV) Kórógyi
- Count of Castell
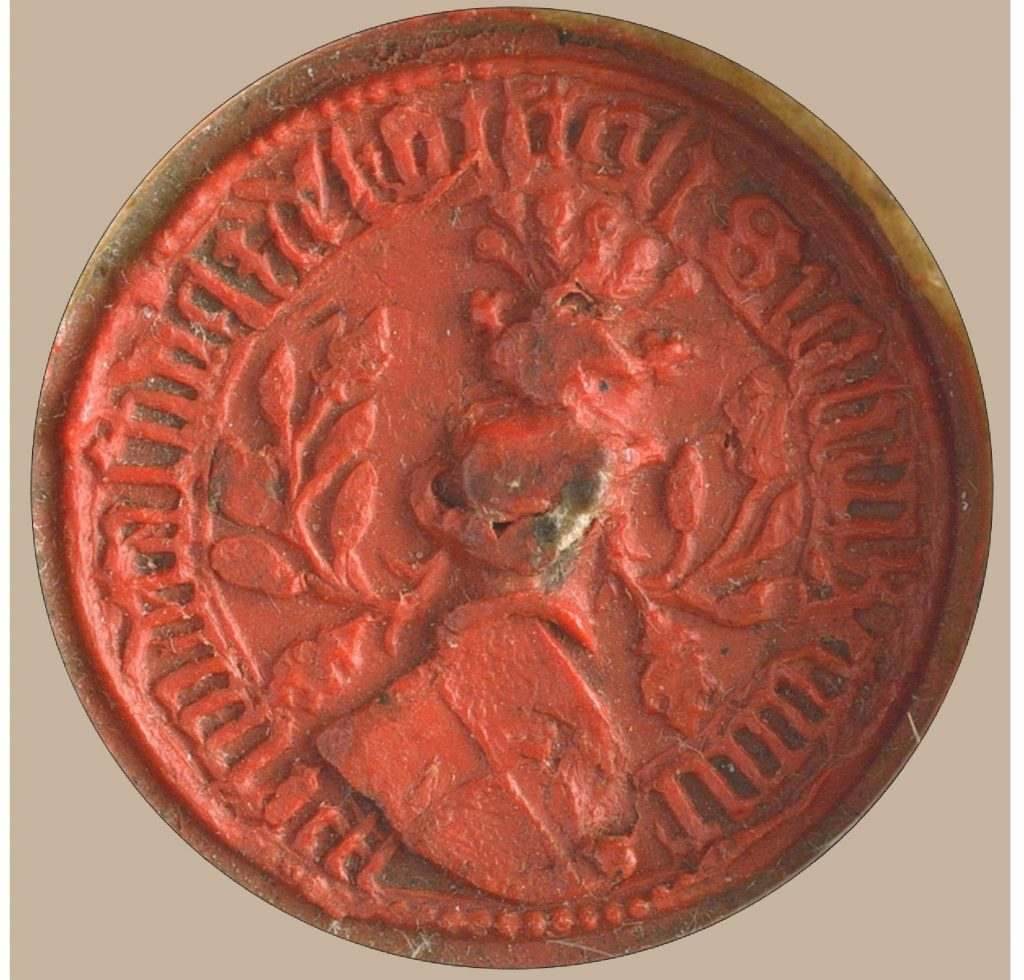
- Seal of John Kórógyi, 1440

Judge royal
- Reign: 1440
- Predecessor: Stephen Báthory
- Successor: George Rozgonyi
- Born: c. 1400
- Died: July/October 1456
- Noble family: House of Kórógyi
- Spouses: 1, Barbara Garai; 2, Anne Maróti (engaged); 3, Elizabeth Bánfi de Gara
- Issue: (3) Caspar
- Father: Philip IX Kórógyi
- Mother: Helena Jolsvai

John (IV) Kórógyi, Count of Castell (Hungarian: Kórógyi (IV.) János, Croatian: Ivan II. Korođski; c. 1400 – July/October 1456) was a Hungarian baron and military leader in the first half of the 15th century, who served as Judge royal for a brief time in 1440, and Ban of Macsó from 1447 to 1456. In this capacity, he was responsible for maintaining the defense system against the Ottoman incursions, and distinguished himself as a military leader in several battles, including the decisive Siege of Belgrade.

== Early life ==
John (IV) originated from the Kórógyi family, which possessed lands in southern Transdanubia and northern Slavonia, primarily around the town Osijek. He was the only known son of Philip IX Kórógyi and Helena Jolsvai. He had two sisters, Catherine and Maria, who married lords John Perényi and Ákos Csupor, respectively. He was part of a respectable and influential kinship, his grandparents, for instance, were barons Stephen Kórógyi and Leustach Jolsvai.

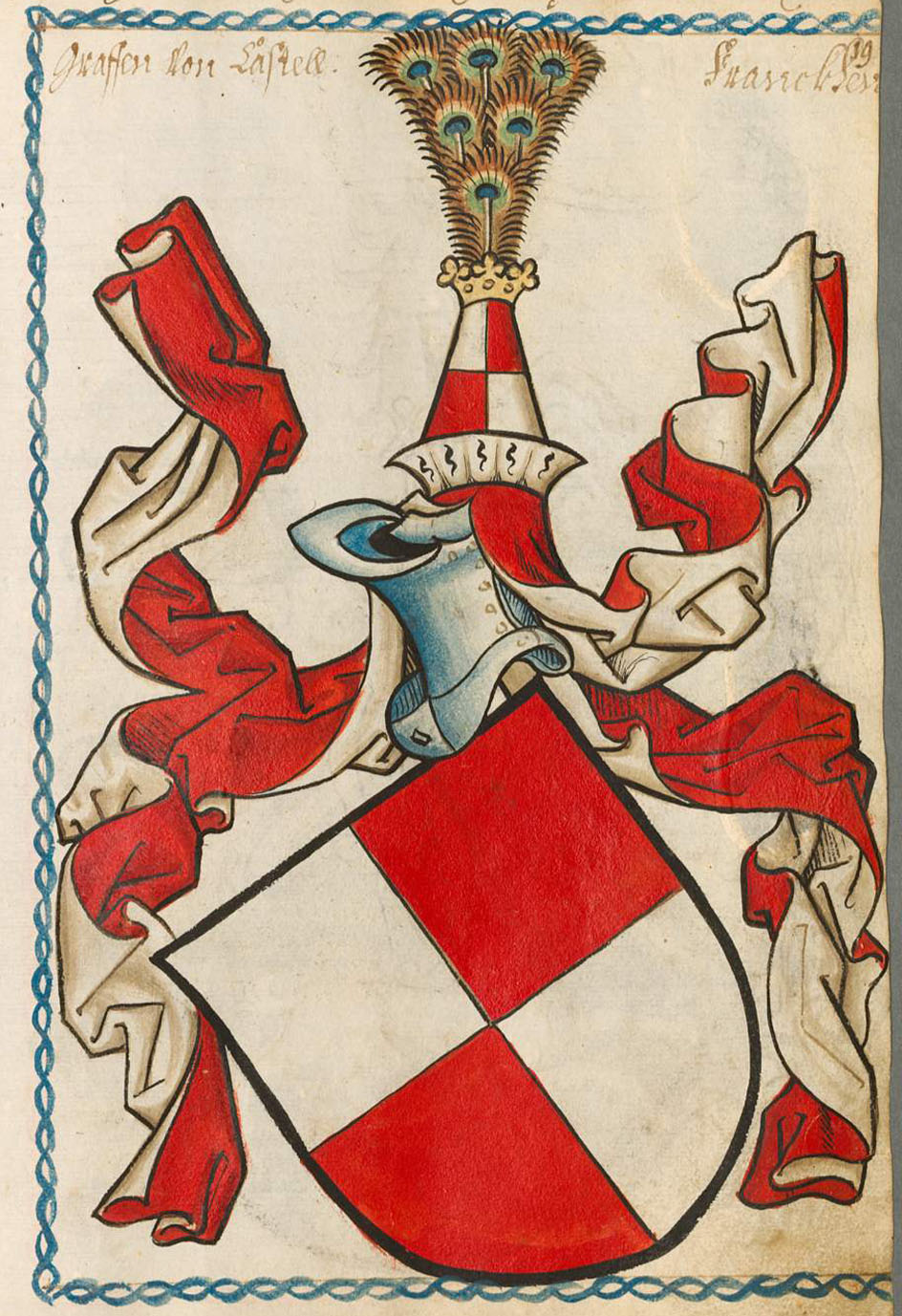
Original coat-of-arms of the Counts of Castell, from the Scheiblersches Wappenbuch

John was born around 1400 or a few years earlier, since he was still a minor in 1411, when his name is first mentioned. He reached adulthood by late 1410s; as a member of the royal court, where he probably grew up, he enjoyed King Sigismund's trust because he is mentioned in documents issued from 1417 to 1426 as a person who went on the king's behalf to investigate various cases and report on them. in 1418–1419, he was involved in that legal process, when the Kórógyis (his uncles) unsuccessfully attempted to acquire the lordships of Darnóc (today Slatinski Drenovac in Croatia) and Atyina for their family, but King Sigismund annulled the contracts. John Kórógyi continued his family's lawsuit against the Cikádor Abbey (in Bátaszék) regarding the distribution of transport duties in Osijek. Upon the order of Sigismund, bans Peter Cseh de Léva and Stephen Újlaki convoked a general assembly for the nobles of Baranya County to discuss the case. After conducting the investigation, which verified the authenticity of previous royal grants, Sigismund confirmed the abbey's right to two-thirds of the customs in Osijek in November 1429.

His father Philip died in 1432 or 1433, leaving his only son John as head of the family (his uncles had also died by then, apparently without male heirs). Thereafter, In 1433–1434, John Kórógyi was involved in a lawsuit against his sisters, Catherine and Maria, regarding the distribution of income in the lordship of Nádasd (with its fort and the surrounding, altogether 55 villages). According to the indictment, although John promised, as part of their agreement, to give part of the proceeds to his sisters after their father's death, he failed to keep his promise from the beginning. In February 1434, King Sigismund ruled in favor of John's widowed mother, Helena Jolsvai, and his two sisters, granting them four years of usufruct. In exchange, John was granted the two-thirds portion of the lordship Csapa in Valkó County (present-day Čepin, Croatia).

In December 1434, when William II, Count of Castell traveled to Pressburg as part of a delegation to visit the imperial court of Sigismund, he met John Kórógyi there, whom he considered a relative due to his parents' previous (1417) contract and correspondence with Philip Kórógyi. William and John Kórógyi concluded a mutual inheritance agreement in Pressburg: if William or his descendants died without an heir, their lordship with all its appurtenances could be inherited by John or his descendants. And although Kórógyi received permission to use the title of Count of Castell from William, it was stipulated that he would not have any rights over the county and its appurtenances or subjects until William's family died out. The same was stipulated by the parties regarding the Kórógyi estates in Hungary. As a sign of kinship, William called himself Count of Castell (comes de Castell) and Lord of Kórógy (dominus de Korogd). Similarly to his father, John was granted the right to use red wax seal. Since William was in a difficult financial situation by then, the wealthy Kórógyi relatives promised him an advantage in the event of a possible inheritance.

== Career ==
=== During the civil war ===
Kórógyi's career began to rise during Albert's short reign. In May 1439, he turned to the Holy See to grant privileges (indulgence and absolution) to the Holy Trinity Parish Church in Osijek, of which he was the patron. He was mentioned among the magnates in 1439. In this capacity, he took part in Albert's unfortunate campaign against the Ottoman Empire in the autumn of that year. On 17 September 1439, he was present at that war council in Tüdőrév (near Titel along the Danube) with the surrounding magnates and nobles, where they decided to renew the campaign against the Ottomans the following year. Albert promised at this time that he would personally organize and lead the army to be raised, and the prelates, barons and nobles (altogether 62 people) present at the council pledged to fully support the king in collecting the extraordinary war tax. Albert fell seriously ill during the campaign. The dying king, who knew that his wife Elizabeth was pregnant, willed his realms to his posthumous child if his wife gave birth to a son, under the guardianship of his widow and his cousin, Frederick of Austria.

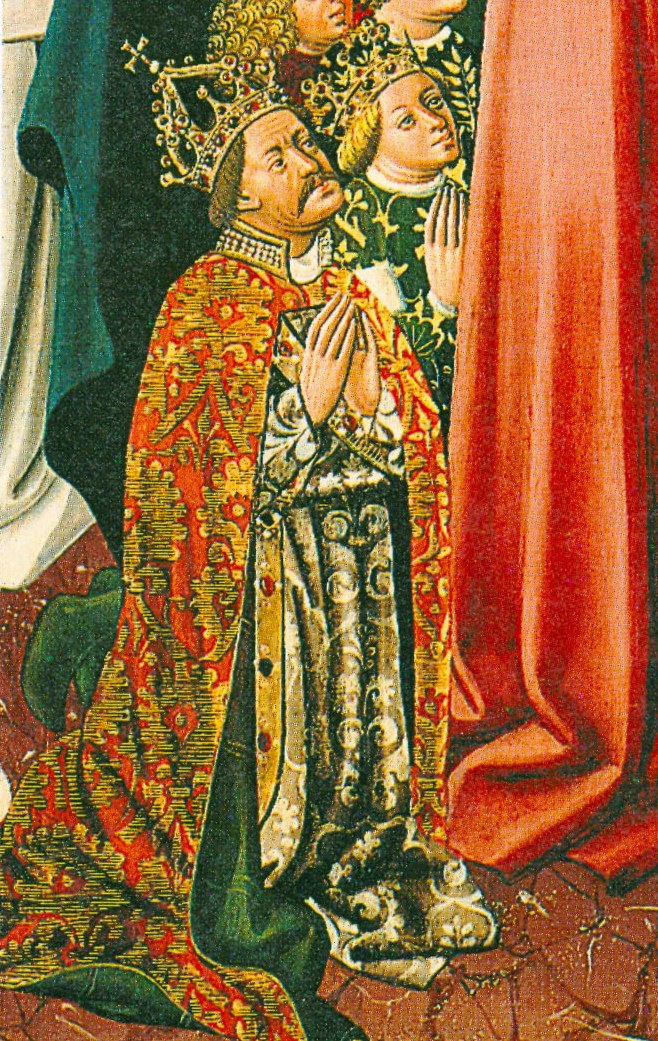
King Albert and Queen Elizabeth as depicted in the Albrechtsaltar in Klosterneuburg Monastery

Following the death of Albert in October 1439, his pregnant wife Elizabeth took control of Hungary as regent. Kórógyi, belonging to the group centered around his relative Ladislaus Garai, supported her aspirations to secure the accession of the unborn child to the throne. However, fearing a new Ottoman invasion of Hungary, the Diet of Hungary, which was composed of the majority of the Hungarian lords and prelates, refused to accept the deceased king's last will and invited Władysław III of Poland to the Hungarian throne. They also wanted to persuade the pregnant queen dowager to marry the new king. Although Elizabeth seemingly agreed to accept their decision, but shortly afterwards, she left Buda for Komárom (present-day Komárno, Slovakia) with her followers, including Kórógyi. She gave birth to a son, named Ladislaus, there in February 1440. Possibly after the coronation of Ladislaus V as King of Hungary in May 1440, Elizabeth appointed Kórógyi as Judge royal, which was the second most important dignity in the kingdom. He replaced the pro-Vladislaus lord Stephen Báthory. Despite Ladislaus' valid coronation (in Székesfehérvár with the stolen Holy Crown), The Hungarian Diet stood by its position, and when Vladislaus I entered Buda in the same month, Queen Elizabeth and her entourage, including Kórógyi, fled first to Győr, and from there to Sopron, taking the infant king with her. Initially, there were attempts at compromise between the two parties. For instance, Vladislaus I acknowledged Kórógyi as Judge royal, and, as Elizabeth's envoys, Garai, Kórógyi and other nobles were granted safe-conduct on 15 June 1440 to participate in the Diet convoked to Buda. As pro-Elizabeth barons, Garai and Kórógyi attempted to mediate between Elizabeth and Vladislaus, but this effort remained unsuccessful. As a result, Kórógyi was present, when the Diet confirmed the election of Vladislaus and declared the infant Ladislaus' coronation invalid on 29 June 1440.

Armed confrontation then became inevitable. Kórógyi held the dignity of Judge royal until at least October 1440. The Diet of Hungary later did not consider his tenure legitimate. Elizabeth established her rival government in Western Transdanubia, Slavonia and Croatia, where the local powerful barons remained stalwart and loyal to the queen. Kórógyi held the title of Ban of Macsó and ispán of Pozsony County in that year; these titles were not recognized by the Diet, and others simultaneously filled the positions. The civil war broke out in the autumn of 1440, after John Hunyadi, who emerged from obscurity and became a leading political and military ally of Vladislaus I, attacked Győr but was unable to take the garrisoned city. Concurrently, Ladislaus Garai instigated a rebellion in the south. Hunyadi, together with Nicholas Újlaki, annihilated Garai's army at Bátaszék on 1 January 1441. Kórógyi also fought in the battle, leading his troops, and he, along with Garai himself, barely managed to flee from the battlefield, according to Johannes de Thurocz's Chronica Hungarorum. During the clashes in the region, Nicholas Újlaki captured one of Kórógyi's fort, Harsány (or Szársomlyó) in Baranya County.

=== Marginalization ===
After Elizabeth's defeat, Kórógyi swore loyalty to Vladislaus I in March 1442. Despite that, for the remainder of Vladislaus' reign, Kórógyi remained out of favor, far from the royal court and national politics. At this time, his name only appears in local property matters. In 1443, he complained to the court of Nicholas Újlaki, Ban of Macsó, for being denied possession of Sotin in Valkó County after his disagreement with his mother-in-law Helena of Corbavia, which estate he claimed through his wife Elizabeth Garai. In March 1443, the court at Erdut heard the case. In September 1443, Benedict, a canon of the Diocese of Bosnia complained that John Garai (son of Desiderius) expropriated the estates Drenovac and Pleternica to Elizabeth, Kórógyi's wife, and her sister Catherine, the wife of Paul Hédervári.

Kórógyi participated in that diet held in Buda on 15 April 1444, where Vladislaus I – in the presence of papal legate Julian Cesarini – swore to renew the war against the Ottomans in the coming summer. Three days later, Kórógyi was among the more than two hundred nobles who confirmed Vladislaus' decree.

=== Return to the elite ===
Vladislaus I was killed in the Battle of Varna on 10 November 1444. This allowed Kórógyi to return to national politics in the years when the child Ladislaus V, who was raised in Vienna, was not in practice the ruler of Hungary and Croatia in his absence. Kórógyi was among the magnates, i.e. he was a member of the extended royal council from 1444 to 1447. He became a strong ally and supporter of his former enemy, captain-in-chief then regent John Hunyadi, who de facto ruled the kingdom since 1445. As an expression of his gratitude, Kórógyi donated his estate Veresegyház in Bács County to John Hunyadi and his sons, Ladislaus and Matthias in March 1447. He participated in that Diet in September 1447, where his former ally Ladislaus Garai was elected Palatine of Hungary. Succeeding Garai, Kórógyi was installed as Ban of Macsó in late 1447, holding the dignity until his death. He served in this capacity alongside Stephen Bebek at least until August 1448, while Nicholas Újlaki, the most powerful baron and landowner in the region, was also styled as a kind of "perpetual" ban for the rest of his life. Beside that, Kórógyi also administered Bács, Baranya, Bodrog, Syrmia, Tolna and Valkó counties as part of his dignity's honour. In this role, Kórógyi played an important role in maintaining the southern border defense system, consisting of a chain of fortresses, set up against Ottoman incursions and large-scale invasions. As a ban, he held his official residence in Osijek, from where he judged disputes between the nobles and church institutions of Valkó, Baranya and the surrounding counties. He issued many charters there throughout 1448.

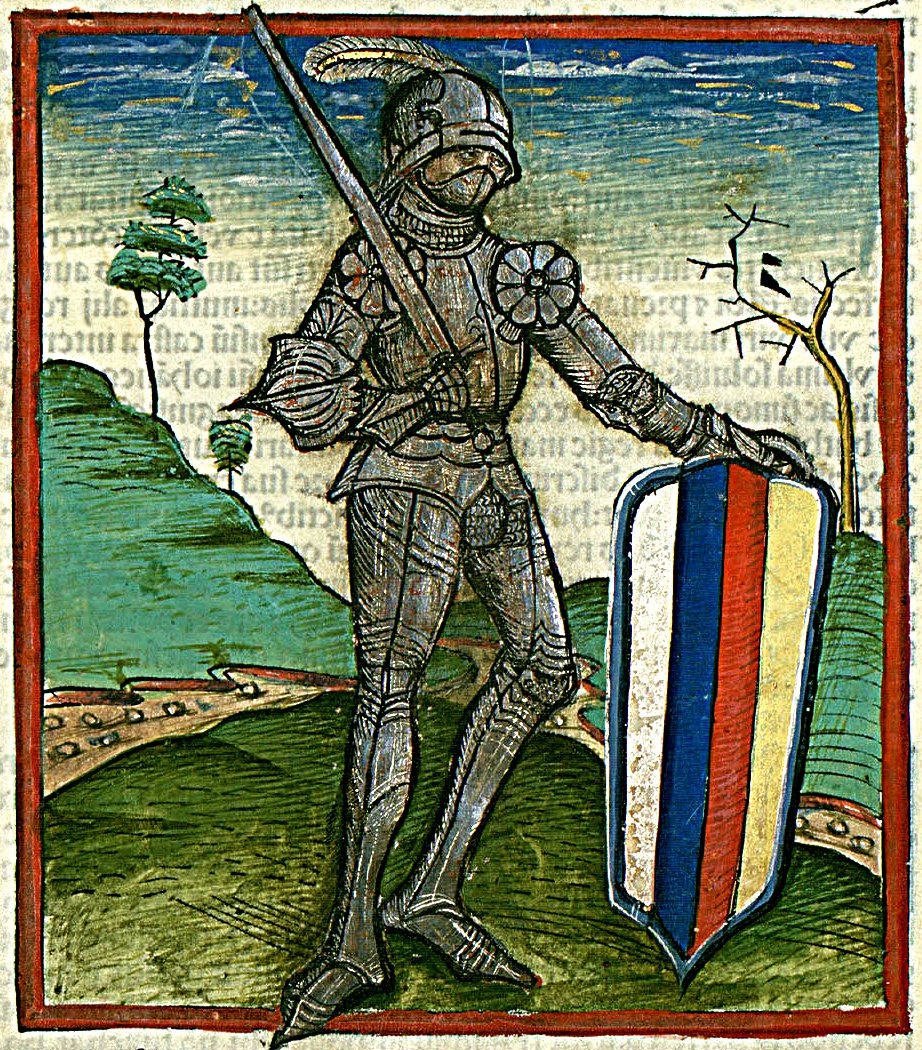
John Hunyadi depicted in Chronica Hungarorum (1488)

Following the Battle of Kosovo, where the Hungarian-led Christian forces were heavily defeated, Kórógyi and other powerful barons traveled to Petrovaradin in November 1448 to achieve the release of John Hunyadi, who, as general of the army, was captured by the then Ottoman-ally Serbian despot Đurađ Branković in retaliation for the damage perpetrated by the Hungarian army in Serbia. The Hungarian barons and prelates who assembled at Szeged persuaded Đurađ to make peace with Hunyadi, who was finally released, and he returned to Hungary in late December 1448, first meeting with the lords, including Kórógyi, in Szeged. As a royal envoy, Kórógyi negotiated with King Thomas of Bosnia at Dobor Fortress in November 1449, in order to increase the security of the Hungarian borders against the Ottoman incursions. There, Thomas pledged a new oath of allegiance and concluded an alliance with Hungary, promising that he will not assist the Ottomans in any undertaking against Hungary. Returning home, he hosted barons Ladislaus Garai and Nicholas Újlaki at his manor in Osijek in February 1450. In addition to the settlement of the usual property disputes, the coordination of the affairs of the southern border protection system and negotiations of a political nature certainly took place. Since that time, John Kórógyi administered Požega County too, while he maintained his aforementioned positions. Through his wife Elizabeth Garai, Kórógyi acquired the half portion of the castle of Drenovac or Darnóc (today Slatinski Drenovac, Croatia) and several surrounding villages in Križevci County in June 1450, during that time when the couple visited Buda. Kórógyi and his wife returned to Osijek by the autumn of 1450, where he judged in legal cases affecting the territory of the Banate of Macsó.

Sometime after the death of Murad II in February 1451, John Hunyadi entrusted Kórógyi to lead a campaign against the Ottoman Empire, however, due to the barons' lack of interest, this campaign did not take place. With the mediation of Branković, Hungary and the Ottoman Empire signed a three-year truce on 20 November. In that year, Nicholas Újlaki visited his court in Osijek, and for two months they judged many cases together. In February 1452, Kórógyi attended that Diet, which assembled in Pressburg to send a delegation to Vienna, where the Austrian noblemen rose up in open rebellion against Frederick III of Germany, Ladislaus' guardian. In the next month, he was a member of the aforementioned delegation which concluded an agreement with the Austrian estates and the Czech and Moravian nobles at the Diet in Vienna to force Frederick to release the young Ladislaus V. Kórógyi spent 1452 and 1453 mostly in Osijek, handling litigation matters, some of which he himself was involved in as a defendant. From mid-1453, Kórógyi also served as ispán of Vrbas (Orbász) County. In that year, Kórógyi acquired Ivánkaszentgyörgy (Ivankovo) in Valkó County, which he already possessed as a pledge from the Harapki (Botos) family. He held a portion in the fort of Pécsvárad in Baranya County too in that year. In November 1453, Emeric, the abbot of Cikádor filed a lawsuit against him in Buda accusing him and his son Caspar of continuing to expropriate the duties due to the abbey in Osijek. By that time, Kórógyi traveled to Buda too, where he and his brother-in-law John Perényi entered into a mutual inheritance contract in January 1454, which would come into effect if either of their families became extinct in the male line. Around the same time, Kórógyi acquired the castle Orljavac in Požega County as a pledge from the Cseh de Léva family; the castle was once, at the end of the 13th century owned by the Kórógyis. In the following period, he was concerned with the administration of the estates he had acquired in Požega County, often at the expense of neighboring landowners.

=== Ottoman threat ===
In December 1454, he met with John Hunyadi, Ladislaus Garai, Nicholas Újlaki and other barons in Petrovaradin to discuss the organization of anti-Ottoman defense system, stating that they received help from German mercenary knights. In June 1455, Kórógyi signed the document in Győr in which the barons swore allegiance to Ladislaus V. Envoys from Ragusa (Dubrovnik, Croatia) were the first to have informed the Hungarian leaders of the preparations that Mehmed II had made for an invasion against Hungary. After the Ottoman capture of Novo Brdo in the summer of 1455, the barons responsible for the southern border system, including Kórógyi, were busy preparing for defense against a large-scale Ottoman invasion. In January 1456, he presumably attended that war council, where the barons agreed to prepare military action against the Ottomans. Kórógyi was in regular correspondence with John of Capistrano, a Franciscan friar and papal inquisitor, who started to preach an anti-Ottoman crusade in Hungary in February 1456. Upon the request of the friar, Kórógyi informed him in a letter dated 22 May 1456 about the Ottoman war plans, including information he had received from the Bosnian king Thomas, the Serbian despot Đurađ Branković, and the Albanian lord Skanderbeg.

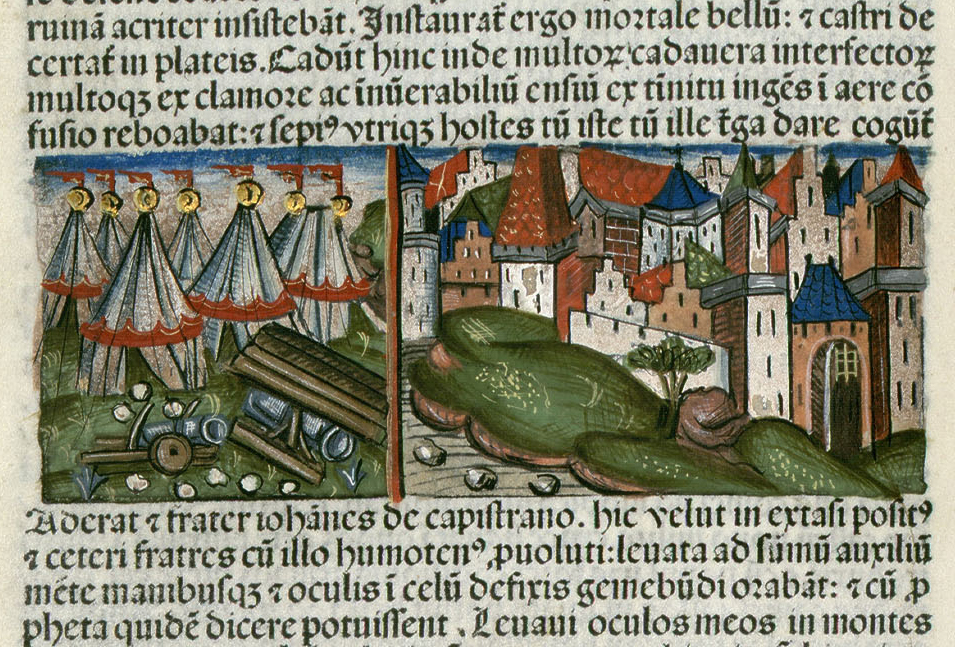
The Siege of Belgrade (Chronica Hungarorum, 1488)

The Diet ordered the mobilization of the armed forces in April, but most barons failed to obey and continued to war against their local adversaries, including the Hussites in Upper Hungary. Hunyadi hired 5,000 Hungarian, Czech and Polish mercenaries and sent them to Belgrade, which was the key fortress of the defense of Hungary's southern frontiers. The Ottoman forces under Mehmed II marched through Serbia and approached Nándorfehérvár (modern-day Belgrade) in June. Beside Hunyadi and his familiares, John Kórógyi was the only baron of the realm, who marched to the stronghold with his banderium, maybe because Belgrade belonged to the Banate of Macsó. A crusade made up mostly of peasants from the nearby counties, who had been roused by John of Capistrano's fiery oratory, also started to assemble at the fortress in the first days of July. Some of them passed through Osijek to Belgrade. The Ottoman siege of Belgrade began on 4 July 1456. When the relief army under the commandment of Hunyadi arrived on 14 July, he ordered the Danube flotilla to move against the enemy blockade, while he and Kórógyi followed the vessels with their troops on both banks of the river. The siege and the nearby battle resulted the crusaders' victory, boosted the morale of European Christian forces and was seen as a turning point in their efforts as it provided a crucial buffer and temporarily halted Ottoman expansion towards Europe beyond the Balkans for 70 years. However, a bubonic plague had broken out and killed many people in the crusaders' camp. In the subsequent months, both John Hunyadi and John of Capistrano died of the disease. Since the sources no longer mention John Kórógyi, it is likely that he also shared a similar fate. In the following years, his widow managed the landholdings.

At the time of his death, Kórógyi was one of the richest barons in the southern part of the kingdom. His permanent residence was his fortified manor in Osijek. He possessed several castles, the ancient seat Korođ (Kórógy), Ivankovo and Nevna (present-day Levanjska Varoš, Croatia) in Valkó County, Baranyavár (present-day Branjin Vrh, Croatia) and Harsány (Szársomlyó) and a portion in Pécsvárad in Baranya County, Cseri in Temes County (laid near present-day Sacoșu Turcesc, Romania), Drenovac in Križevci County and Orljavac in Požega County.

== Personal life ==
John Kórógyi married three times. His first wife was Barbara, the daughter of Palatine Nicholas Garai. In November 1434, Pope Eugene IV allowed them to use a portable altar and to celebrate mass with their priests everywhere. The pope also granted them indulgence on that occasion. The pope ordered Henry Albeni, the Bishop of Pécs to dispense John and Barbara ho contracted marriage without the knowledge of their parents, on the grounds of kinship, because Barbara's mother – Countess Anna of Celje – was the godmother of John Kórógyi.

Following the death of his first wife prior to 1437, Kórógyi intended to marry Anne, the daughter of John Maróti. However, before the wedding, due to the strife and bloodshed that arose between the relatives of the two parties, he sent a petition to Pope Eugene IV to annul the marriage, and upon his request for annulment of the marriage, explaining that it had not been consummated, King Sigismund also addressed the pope, who, on 19 December 1437, instructed Bishop Henry Albeni to annul the marriage.

Sometime between 1440 and 1443, John Kórógyi married Elizabeth, the daughter of John Garai from family's Bánfi branch. She was still a young girl (puella) in 1440. She is mentioned as the wife of John Kórógyi in 1443 and 1449. Their marriage produced a son Caspar, who is first mentioned as a minor in 1447. He is described as "a child at a tender age" still in 1454. Elizabeth last appears as a widow in 1467. As the only known child of his father, Caspar was the last male member of the Kórógyi family, which became extinct with his death in 1472.

== Sources ==
- Brkanić, Monika (2026). "Bračne veze obitelji Korođski [Marriage Alliances of the Family of Kórógy]". Osijeker Sammelband (in Croatian). 41. Muzej Slavonije Osijek: 9–15. ISSN 0473-4882.
- Brkanić, Monika; Njari, Denis (2025). "Pregled službi i funkcija plemića Korođskih unutar vladarskog aparata srednjovjekovnog Ugarsko-Hrvatskog Kraljevstva [An Overview of the Offices and Roles of the Noble Lords of Kórógy within the Governance Apparatus of the Medieval Kingdom of Hungary–Croatia]". In Bockovac, Tímea; Grgić, Stipica; Lehocki-Samardžić, Ana; Varga, Szabolcs (eds.). Otthon két hazában. Ünnepi tanulmánykötet Sokcsevits Dénes tiszteletére / Dom(a) u obje domovine. Zbornik radova u čast Dinka Šokčevića [At home in Two Countries. A Celebratory Volume of Studies in Honor of Dénes Sokcsevits] (in Croatian). Magyarországi Horvát Oktatásért Alapítvány / Zaklada za hrvatsko školstvo u Mađarskoj, Glotta Nyelvi Intézet / Institut za jezik Glotta, Horvát Történettudományi Intézet / Hrvatski institut za povijest, ELTE HTK Történettudományi Kutatóintézet / Institut za istraživanje povijesti Centra za istraživanje humanističkih znanosti Sveučilišta Eötvös Loránd. pp. 157–167. ISBN 978-615-02-5447-0.
- Čoralić, Lovorka; Andrić, Stanko (2009). "Korođski, Ivan II.". Croatian Biographical Lexicon (in Croatian). Miroslav Krleža Lexicographical Institute.
- Engel, Pál (1996). Magyarország világi archontológiája, 1301–1457, I. [Secular Archontology of Hungary, 1301–1457, Volume I] (in Hungarian). História, MTA Történettudományi Intézete. ISBN 963-8312-44-0.
- Markó, László (2006). A magyar állam főméltóságai Szent Istvántól napjainkig: Életrajzi Lexikon [Great Officers of State in Hungary from King Saint Stephen to Our Days: A Biographical Encyclopedia] (in Hungarian). Helikon Kiadó. ISBN 963-547-085-1.
- Mažuran, Ive (1994). Srednjovjekovni i turski Osijek [Medieval and Turkish Osijek] (in Croatian). Zavod za znanstveni rad HAZU u Osijeku, Gradsko poglavarstvo Osijek, Školska knjiga Zagreb. ISBN 953-154-040-3.
- Neumann, Tibor (2014). "Találkozó Konstanzban: A Kórógyiak grófi címe [Meeting in Konstanz: The Title of the Kórógyi Counts]". Turul (in Hungarian). 87 (3). Magyar Heraldikai és Genealógiai Társaság: 104–108. ISSN 1216-7258.
- Pálosfalvi, Tamás (2018). From Nicopolis to Mohács. A History of Ottoman–Hungarian Warfare, 1389–1526. Brill. ISBN 978-90-04-36584-1.

John IV House of Kórógyi Born: c. 1400 Died: July/October 1456
Political offices
Preceded by Stephen Báthory	Judge royal 1440	Succeeded by George Rozgonyi
Preceded by Ladislaus Garai	Ban of Macsó alongside Stephen Bebek (1447–1448); 1447–1456	Succeeded by Paul Herceg
Hungarian nobility
Preceded by Philip Kórógyi	— TITULAR — Count of Castell; 1432/3–1456	Succeeded by Caspar Kórógyi
