= John III Kórógyi =

Hungarian lord

John (III) Kórógyi

Master of the horse
- Reign: 1395–1396
- Predecessor: Stephen Lackfi
- Successor: John Bebek
- Died: after 1399
- Noble family: House of Kórógyi
- Father: Stephen I Kórógyi

John (III) Kórógyi (Hungarian: Kórógyi (III.) János; died after 1399) was a Hungarian nobleman in the late 14th century, who served as Master of the horse from 1395 to 1396.

== Career ==
John (III) was born around 1360 into the Kórógyi family as the eldest son of powerful baron Stephen (I) Kórógyi. He had four brothers – Ladislaus (VI), Philip (IX), Nicholas (II) and Stephen (II) – and a sister Dorothea.

John first appears in contemporary records in July 1384, when Queen Mary donated the lands of the rebellious John of Palisna in Križevci County in Slavonia to Stephen Kórógyi and his three elder sons – John, Ladislaus and Philip –, citing his merits and loyalty. This indicates that John was of legal age by that time. John participated in the royal campaign against Moravian Serbia in the autumn of 1389, together with his father. In that year, Stephen and his three elder sons, including John, were granted the estate Németi (present-day a borough of Szalánta) with its accessories in Baranya County in exchange for Paližna by King Sigismund. Stephen Kórógyi also acquired the castle of Kos with the surrounding villages (including Csapa) in 1392 for himself and his descendants.

He was admitted to the royal court thanks to his influential father. He was styled as a relator in 1392. While his father still alive, holding the dignity of Ban of Macsó, John served as Master of the horse in the royal court of Sigismund from 1395 to 1396. In this capacity, John participated in the Crusade of Nicopolis in the summer-autumn 1396. Returning Hungary, he was dismissed from his position, and his father also died in that year. In August 1397, Ladislaus Keresztúri filed a lawsuit before the cathedral chapter of Vác that John, Ladislaus and Philip unlawfully seized and looted his estate Kamarás in Arad County. Upon the request of John and his four brothers in March 1399, King Sigismund transcribed and confirmed his former judgment regarding the estate Karanac in favor of the Kórógyi family. This is the last mention of John and Ladislaus; their younger brother Philip became head of the family thereafter. Since it is known that Ladislaus intended to participate in Sigismund's campaign against Prokop of Moravia in late 1399, it is possible that John was also present, and perhaps both were killed there.

== Sources ==
- Brkanić, Monika; Njari, Denis (2025). "Pregled službi i funkcija plemića Korođskih unutar vladarskog aparata srednjovjekovnog Ugarsko-Hrvatskog Kraljevstva [An Overview of the Offices and Roles of the Noble Lords of Kórógy within the Governance Apparatus of the Medieval Kingdom of Hungary–Croatia]". In Bockovac, Tímea; Grgić, Stipica; Lehocki-Samardžić, Ana; Varga, Szabolcs (eds.). Otthon két hazában. Ünnepi tanulmánykötet Sokcsevits Dénes tiszteletére / Dom(a) u obje domovine. Zbornik radova u čast Dinka Šokčevića [At home in Two Countries. A Celebratory Volume of Studies in Honor of Dénes Sokcsevits] (in Croatian). Magyarországi Horvát Oktatásért Alapítvány / Zaklada za hrvatsko školstvo u Mađarskoj, Glotta Nyelvi Intézet / Institut za jezik Glotta, Horvát Történettudományi Intézet / Hrvatski institut za povijest, ELTE HTK Történettudományi Kutatóintézet / Institut za istraživanje povijesti Centra za istraživanje humanističkih znanosti Sveučilišta Eötvös Loránd. pp. 157–167. ISBN 978-615-02-5447-0.
- Engel, Pál (1996). Magyarország világi archontológiája, 1301–1457, I. [Secular Archontology of Hungary, 1301–1457, Volume I] (in Hungarian). História, MTA Történettudományi Intézete. ISBN 963-8312-44-0.
- Krantzieritz, Károly (2015). "A nikápolyi csata magyar résztvevői [Hungarian participants of the Battle of Nicopolis]". Hadtörténelmi Közlemények (in Hungarian). 128 (1). Hadtörténeti Intézet és Múzeum: 162–183. ISSN 0017-6540.
- Mažuran, Ive (1994). Srednjovjekovni i turski Osijek [Medieval and Turkish Osijek] (in Croatian). Zavod za znanstveni rad HAZU u Osijeku, Gradsko poglavarstvo Osijek, Školska knjiga Zagreb. ISBN 953-154-040-3.

John III House of Kórógyi Born: ? Died: after 1399
Political offices
Preceded by Stephen Lackfi	Master of the horse 1395–1396	Succeeded by John Bebek
