= Philip IX Kórógyi =

Hungarian lord

Philip (IX) Kórógyi
- Count of Castell

Treasurer of the Queen's Court
- Reign: 1413–1419
- Predecessor: Stephen Csupor
- Successor: Nicholas Bebek (1430)
- Died: 1432 or 1433
- Noble family: House of Kórógyi
- Spouse: Helena Jolsvai
- Issue: John IV; Catherine; Maria
- Father: Stephen I Kórógyi

Philip (IX) Kórógyi (Hungarian: Kórógyi (IX.) Fülpös; died 1432 or 1433) was a Hungarian baron and diplomat in the first decades of the 15th century, who served as Treasurer of the Queen's Court from 1413 to 1419. He was a confidant of King Sigismund. He was the first indigenous magnate who bore the title count in Hungary after the adoption of his title Count of Castell received royal approval.

== Early life ==
Philip (IX), also known as Philpus, was born around 1365 into the Kórógyi family as the third son of powerful baron Stephen (I) Kórógyi. He had four brothers – John (III), Ladislaus (VI), Nicholas (II) and Stephen (II) – and a sister Dorothea.

Philip first appears in contemporary records in July 1384, when Queen Mary donated the lands of the rebellious John of Palisna in Križevci County in Slavonia to Stephen Kórógyi and his three elder sons – John, Ladislaus and Philip –, citing his merits and loyalty. This indicates that Philip was of legal age by that time. In 1389, Stephen Kórógyi and his three elder sons, including Philip, were granted the estate Németi (present-day a borough of Szalánta) with its accessories in Baranya County in exchange for Paližna by King Sigismund. Stephen Kórógyi also acquired the castle of Kos with the surrounding villages (including Csapa) in 1392 for himself and his descendants, namely the three sons, who reached adulthood by then.

Their father Stephen died in March 1397. In August 1397, Ladislaus Keresztúri filed a lawsuit before the cathedral chapter of Vác that John, Ladislaus and Philip unlawfully seized and looted his estate Kamarás in Arad County. Upon the request of Philip and his four brothers in March 1399, King Sigismund transcribed and confirmed his former judgment regarding the estate Karanac in favor of the Kórógyi family. This is the last mention of John and Ladislaus; their younger brother Philip became head of the family thereafter. Since it is known that Ladislaus intended to participate in Sigismund's campaign against Prokop of Moravia in late 1399, it is possible that both were killed there.

== Career ==
Philip Kórógyi first appears independently in contemporary records in February 1401, when members of the neighboring Monostori family, Ladislaus and Peter, filed a lawsuit against him and his widowed mother accusing them of causing damage to their estate in Karanac by their subjects. Judge royal Frank Szécsényi postponed the trial because Kórógyi performed royal service. The trial continued into November 1402, but was postponed again because both families were "engaged in royal service". The hostility between the two families continued in the following years (for instance, in 1405, Philip Kórógyi and his servants attacked and looted the Monostoris' estate in Bezedek in 1405). Kórógyi remained a confidant of King Sigismund, whose rule was challenged by the organizing baronial groups in the early years of the 15th century. Sometime after 1401, he joined the League of Siklós, centered around Nicholas Garai, which released the king from captivity and desired to maintain his reign. Kórógyi served as ispán (castellan) of the royal fort of Miháld (present-day Mehadia, Romania) alongside John Alsáni in 1402. In this capacity, he attended the general diet held in Pressburg (present-day Bratislava, Slovakia) in September 1402, where the magnates of Hungary declared that they will elect Albert IV, Duke of Austria as the king of Hungary, if Sigismund dies without a male heir.

Kórógyi remained an influential partisan of Sigismund in 1403–1404, when a civil war broke out between the monarch and the supporters of rival claimant Ladislaus of Naples. He fought in the royal army's campaign into Slavonia commanded by John Maróti; his residence Osijek functioned as a hinterland to the later campaigns, which already targeted Bosnia. He was made ispán of Temes and Krassó counties, and castellan of Sebes Castle (today Turnu Ruieni, Romania) in 1404, together with John Alsáni. In this capacity, they jointly possessed the forts Érsomlyó and Krassó (present-day Vršac in Serbia and Carașova in Romania, respectively) as part of their honour. Upon Philip's request, Sigismund confirmed him and his brothers, Nicholas (II) and Stephen (II), as the rightful owners of the fort Kos and its accessories in January 1406. In the summer of 1406, Philip Kórógyi, together with John Garai, traveled to the court of King Martin of Aragon by order of Sigismund, where they performed diplomatic service. In August, they obtained a letter of asylum from Martin, which allowed them to leave his kingdom freely for 15 days, along with their horses and treasures. According to the source, their route led towards Castile, Portugal, and Granada. It is also conceivable that they went on a pilgrimage to Santiago de Compostella. Garai and Kórógyi returned to Hungary by the spring of 1407. Kórógyi's high social status is well indicated by the fact that Pope Gregory XII allowed him to use a portable altar and to celebrate mass with his priests everywhere in March 1408.

In 1410, Kórógyi acted as relator in a legal decision made by Palatine Nicholas Garai, which shows that he remained an important political ally of the Garai family. In 1412, Judge royal Simon Rozgonyi determined the boundaries of their respective estates in Lak, Baranya County (present-day Kneževo, Croatia) between Nicholas Garai and Philip Kórógyi, which recorded their common ownership and peaceful neighborly relations. Since that year, Kórógyi was frequently mentioned among the magnates of Hungary, thus he was a permanent member of the expanded royal council, regardless of whether he held an official position or not at that point. In March 1412, he accompanied Sigismund to the negotiations with King Władysław II Jagiełło of Poland in the town of Lubló in Szepes County (present-day Stará Ľubovňa, Slovakia), and on 15 May 1412 he was mentioned among the prelates, barons and nobles of the kingdom belonging to the entourage of Sigismund and Władysław, who jointly arrived to Buda to celebrate their peace treaty.

Kórógyi was appointed Treasurer of the Queen's Court in late 1412 or early 1413. It was the most prestigious office in the court of Queen Barbara of Cilli. In this capacity, he spent years abroad, when he was part of Sigismund's large entourage at the Council of Constance from 1414 to 1418. The chronicler Ulrich of Richenthal called him as "grauf Philip Ingoro" and "comes Philippus in Gorott". Antipope John XXIII addressed him as a soldier and baron of the Kingdom of Hungary, when he permitted Kórógyi to erect a Franciscan monastery at his estate Perecske in Baranya County. Upon his request, the pope also allowed him, as patron, to remove the prior of the Augustinian monastery in Osijek due to the neglect of the building complex and his tasks. During his stay in the council, in 1416 through his representative, Kórógyi was involved in collecting a ransom of 65,000 gold florins for John Maróti and other nobles captured by the Ottomans and their ally Hrvoje Vukčić Hrvatinić in Bosnia in 1415, that took place either near Doboj or in the Lašva Valley. While Kórógyi was abroad, his lawsuits against the Töttös de Bátmonostor family regarding the possession Bóly in Baranya County were constantly postponed.

After the death of their brother-in-law, Peter Atyinai in 1418, Philip and Stephen Kórógyi, also in the name of Philip's son, John (IV), tried unsuccessfully to acquire the lordships of Darnóc (today Slatinski Drenovac in Croatia) and Atyina for their family, citing a previous pledge to their sister Dorothea, but King Sigismund annulled the contracts between the Kórógyis and Sigismund Atyinai, granting the estates to the latter as hereditary possessions in August 1419. Philip Kórógyi served as Treasurer of the Queen's Court until early 1419, when rumors reached Sigismund that Queen Barbara had an affair with a German knight during his stay at Konstanz, and, as a result, the king took away the queen's possessions, dissolved her entourage and exiled her to Várad (present-day Oradea, Romania). After that, Philip Kórógyi only appears sporadically in the sources. His lawsuits against the John Töttös were postponed several times in 1419–1420 and 1423–1424, as well as his lawsuits against the Monostoris. Due to financial difficulties, Kórógyi pledged his estate Cseneréve in Baranya County to Blaise Vasadi in 1425. Three years later, in 1428, John Maróti questioned the Kórógyi family's right of possession to Karanac. After ordering an investigation, King Sigismund ruled in favor of Philip Kórógyi. He acted as a relator in 1429. In 1431 and 1432, Kórógyi was styled himself as Master of the treasury in his two charters, however, this had no real basis, because Peter Berzevici held this position at the time. Philip Kórógyi died sometime between January 1432 and June 1433.

== Count of Castell ==
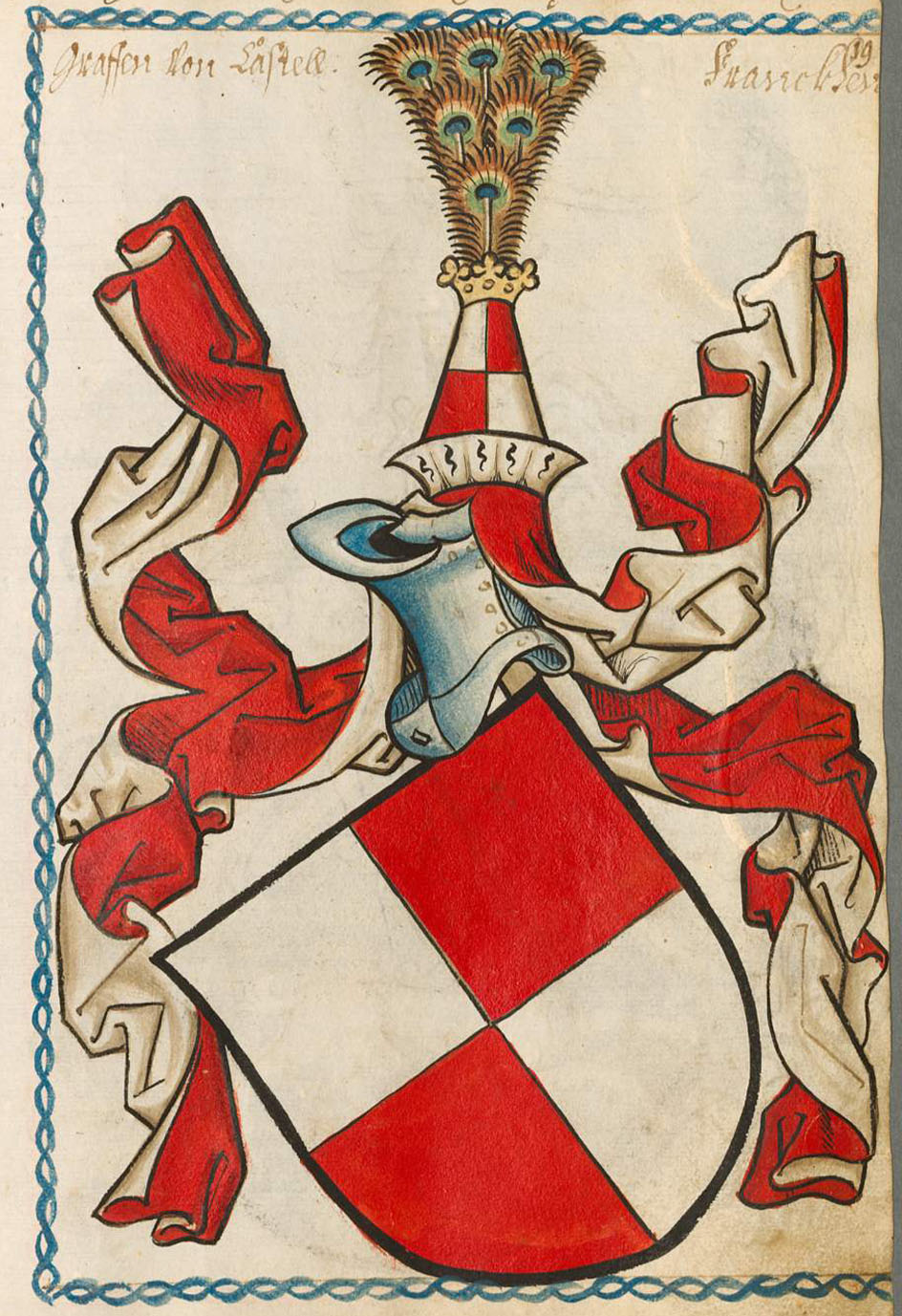
Original coat-of-arms of the Counts of Castell, from the Scheiblersches Wappenbuch

Philip Kórógyi bore the title "Count of Castell and Lord of Kórógy" (Latin: comes de Castellis dominusque de Korogh), also using red wax seal, for the first time in November 1417. Months earlier, in January 1417, there is still no trace of this title, and he sealed his own charter with a green wax seal. While earlier historiography – for instance, Gyula Pauler or Elemér Mályusz – considered Philip's title of usage as "baseless", "fictitious" or "exaggerated whim", but in medieval Hungary, no one could use the title of count and red wax on their seals without the permission and consent of the king.

Kórógyi met the members of the House of Castell, a German noble family from the Holy Roman Empire at the Council of Constance, where the reigning count Leonard and his two sons, Frederick and William attended too. Here, both sides noticed that their coats of arms – squared red-silver triangular shield – were identical to the other side's, which suggested the existence of a previously forgotten kinship relationship between the two families. The House of Castell found the origin of the kinship in an early crusade, which resulted in one branch of the family settling in Hungary. With the support of King Sigismund, Count Leonard and Philip adopted each other as brothers or relatives, and in addition to the adoption, they gave each other permission to take each other's titles. Thereafter, the Kórógyis called themselves "dominus de Korogh" which is an unusual formula in Latin usage in Hungary. The use of the title of count did not extend to Philip's still living brother, Stephen (II). After the Counts of Cilli of foreign origin, the Kórógyi family was the first indigenous family in the Kingdom of Hungary to hold the title of count in the Western European sense from the ranks of the secular aristocracy.

Although the title of count and the right to use red wax seal carried a significant prestige value for Philip Kórógyi, as a German noble title it did not distinguish the Kórógyis from the ranks of the Hungarian aristocracy, where the court dignities held and the number of estates still mattered. In 1434, shortly after the death of Philip Kórógyi, William II, Count of Castell and John Kórógyi (Philip's son) concluded a mutual inheritance agreement in Pressburg: if William or his descendants died without an heir, their lordship with all its appurtenances could be inherited by John or his descendants. And although Kórógyi received permission to use the title of Count of Castell from William, it was stipulated that he would not have any rights over the county and its appurtenances or subjects until William's family died out. The same was stipulated by the parties regarding the Kórógyi estates in Hungary. As a sign of kinship, William called himself Count of Castell (comes de Castell) and Lord of Kórógy (dominus de Korogd).

== Personal life ==
Philip Kórógyi married Helena Jolsvai, the daughter of Palatine Leustach Jolsvai, who was captured by the Turks during the Battle of Nicopolis in 1396, and died in captivity. In 1400, Helena was involved in that unsuccessful process, when her family attempted to collect the ransom demanded for her father. The date of their marriage is unknown, but their only known son John (IV) was still a minor in 1411. They also had two daughters, Catherine and Maria, who married magnates John Perényi and Ákos Csupor, respectively. Helena Jolsvai first appears as widow in June 1433, whe she borrowed 600 Venetian gold ducats to Peter Cseh de Léva for his fights against the Hussites in Upper Hungary. She is last mentioned as a living person in September 1436.

== Sources ==
- Brkanić, Monika (2026). "Bračne veze obitelji Korođski [Marriage Alliances of the Family of Kórógy]". Osijeker Sammelband (in Croatian). 41. Muzej Slavonije Osijek: 9–15. ISSN 0473-4882.
- Brkanić, Monika; Njari, Denis (2025). "Pregled službi i funkcija plemića Korođskih unutar vladarskog aparata srednjovjekovnog Ugarsko-Hrvatskog Kraljevstva [An Overview of the Offices and Roles of the Noble Lords of Kórógy within the Governance Apparatus of the Medieval Kingdom of Hungary–Croatia]". In Bockovac, Tímea; Grgić, Stipica; Lehocki-Samardžić, Ana; Varga, Szabolcs (eds.). Otthon két hazában. Ünnepi tanulmánykötet Sokcsevits Dénes tiszteletére / Dom(a) u obje domovine. Zbornik radova u čast Dinka Šokčevića [At home in Two Countries. A Celebratory Volume of Studies in Honor of Dénes Sokcsevits] (in Croatian). Magyarországi Horvát Oktatásért Alapítvány / Zaklada za hrvatsko školstvo u Mađarskoj, Glotta Nyelvi Intézet / Institut za jezik Glotta, Horvát Történettudományi Intézet / Hrvatski institut za povijest, ELTE HTK Történettudományi Kutatóintézet / Institut za istraživanje povijesti Centra za istraživanje humanističkih znanosti Sveučilišta Eötvös Loránd. pp. 157–167. ISBN 978-615-02-5447-0.
- Engel, Pál (1996). Magyarország világi archontológiája, 1301–1457, I. [Secular Archontology of Hungary, 1301–1457, Volume I] (in Hungarian). História, MTA Történettudományi Intézete. ISBN 963-8312-44-0.
- Mažuran, Ive (1994). Srednjovjekovni i turski Osijek [Medieval and Turkish Osijek] (in Croatian). Zavod za znanstveni rad HAZU u Osijeku, Gradsko poglavarstvo Osijek, Školska knjiga Zagreb. ISBN 953-154-040-3.
- Neumann, Tibor (2014). "Találkozó Konstanzban: A Kórógyiak grófi címe [Meeting in Konstanz: The Title of the Kórógyi Counts]". Turul (in Hungarian). 87 (3). Magyar Heraldikai és Genealógiai Társaság: 104–108. ISSN 1216-7258.

Philip IX House of Kórógyi Born: ? Died: 1432 or 1433
Political offices
Preceded by Stephen Csupor	Treasurer of the Queen's Court; 1413–1419	Succeeded by Vacant; Nicholas Bebek (1430)
Hungarian nobility
New title	— TITULAR — Count of Castell; 1417–1432/3	Succeeded by John Kórógyi
