= Lawrence of Ilok =

Renaissance-era Voivode

- Voivode (Duke)
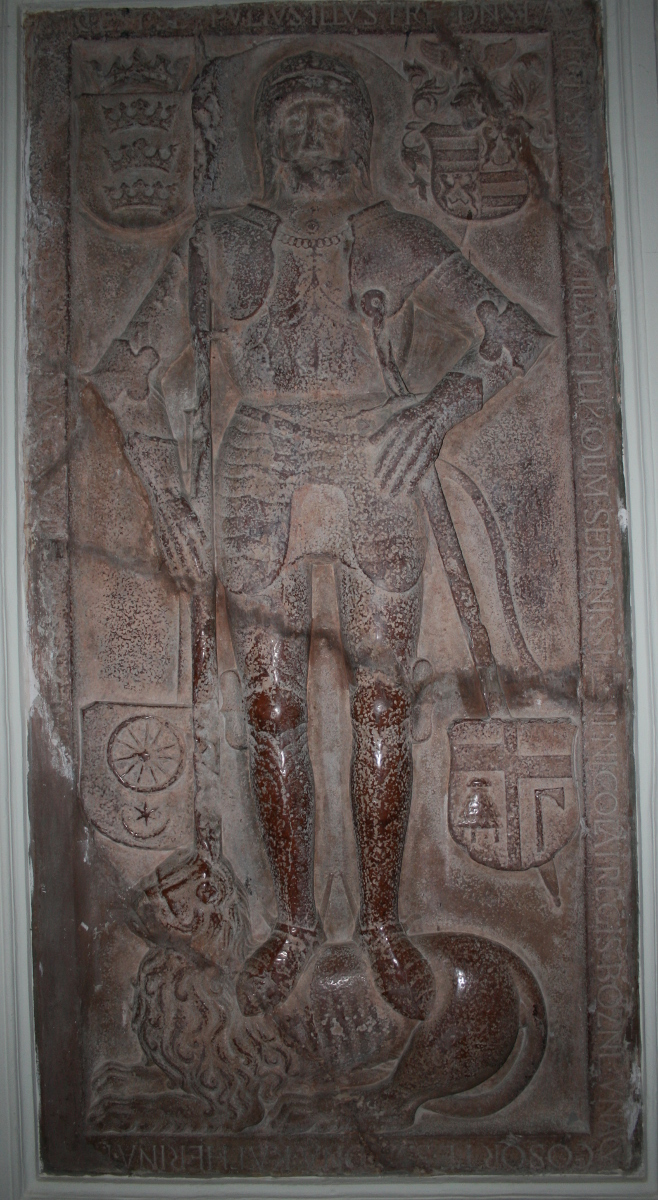
- Predecessor: Nicholas of Ilok
- Known for: Ban of Macsó, Voivode (Duke) of Bosnia, Ban of Belgrade, member of the Royal Chamber Council, judge royal etc.
- Born: 1459
- Died: 1524 (aged 64–65)
- Residence: Ilok, Kingdom of Hungary-Croatia
- Spouse(s): 1) Catherine Pongrác of Dengeleg; 2) Magdalene Bakóci

Lawrence of Ilok (Croatian: Lovro Iločki, Hungarian: Újlaki Lőrinc; c. August 1459 – c. June 1524) was a Croatian-Hungarian nobleman, a member of the Iločki noble family, very wealthy and powerful in the Kingdom of Hungary-Croatia. He held the title "Voivode (Duke) of Ilok" and Voivode of Bosnia, and was during his life Ban of Macsó (1477–1492), Ban of Belgrade (1511–1513), member of the Royal Chamber Council (around 1516) and judge royal (1517–1524).

== Biography ==
=== Ancestry and family ===
He was born between 6 August and 3 September 1459. The son of Nicholas of Ilok, Ban (viceroy) of Croatia, Voivode of Transylvania as well as titular King of Bosnia, and his second wife Dorothy Széchy of Gornja Lendava, Lawrence was born most probably in Ilok, the family seat, as a descendant of once lower-nobility-family from Dubica County in Lower Slavonia (an area that corresponds to modern northwestern Bosnia, on the right bank of the Sava river), whose first known member was Gug (in some sources Göge), who had lived in the 13th century. He was the third in a row to have carried the name Lawrence in his family; his great-great-great-grandfather was Lawrence I, called Slaven (English: The Slav, Latin: Sclavus), Hungarian: Tót), who died in 1349, and the nephew of the latter was named Lawrence II (floruit 1325–1367).

Having remained the sole male descendant of his father, he inherited large estates with a lot of castles and fortified towns after his father's death in 1477. He succeeded in retaining most of the power and reputation of the family. From the two of his marriages there was just one issue, a son, who died at an early age. His first wife was Catherine Pongrác of Dengeleg, a daughter of John Pongrác, Voivode of Transylvania, who died around 1510. Then he married Magdalene Bakóci, who survived him and later married Ladislaus More of Csula.

=== Political orientation ===
First mentioned in documents as early as 1460, then in his father's will in 1471, Lawrence of Ilok inherited in 1477 not only the whole property of Nicholas of Ilok, but a continuity of the latter's political orientation as well. This became obvious after the death of King Matthias Corvinus in 1490, as he, like the majority of Croatian nobility, strongly supported Matthias' illegitimate son John Corvinus to be a new king. Since Hungarian nobility preferred and finally elected Vladislaus II Jagiellon, he did not accept it but joined the supporters of the third candidate to the throne, Maximilian I of Austria, who started a war against Jagiellon.

It was a long-term relationship between the Habsburgs and the House of Ilok, because his father Nicholas had been a supporter of Frederick III much before Lawrence was born, and even became godfather of Frederick's new-born son Maximilian in 1459.

In the war between the two pretenders to the crown, which lasted from 1490 to 1491 and ended with the signing of the Peace of Pressburg, he was firmly on the Habsburg's side. At the end of hostilities, he still did not recognize the Treaty and Jagiellon as the new ruling king. When Jagiellon's army attacked him in 1494, he was forced to withdraw and flee, losing almost all of his estates. Then finally he changed his mind, and, with help from some influential king's advisors, managed to reach the king in an audience in Pécs in order to apologize to him and to reconcile. It was only in 1496 that his estates were returned to him, under condition of being confiscated after his death without leaving a male heir.

=== Mature age and final years ===
Having received his properties back, he tried, like his father before him, to maintain them and to build and renovate fortifications, due to every-day increasing Ottoman danger. The most exposed of all of his lands were those in northeastern Bosnia and in the southern part of Macsó banate.

He supported the Catholic Church and was its patron. He financed the erection of new sacral buildings and the renewal of the old ones. Especially he focused his efforts on urging the pope to canonize John Capistrano, since this catholic martyr died in Ilok and was buried there in the local franciscan church, but with no success.

After reconciliation with the king, he performed several high state duties, e.g. Ban of Belgrade (1511–1513), member of the Royal Chamber Council (around 1516) and judge royal (1517–1524).

Lawrence of Ilok died between 23 May and 15 June 1524, and was buried in the Franciscan church of St. John of Capistrano in his town Ilok, next to the graves of his first wife Catherine and his father Nicholas. Although slightly damaged, his gravestone is rather well preserved and is being open to the public today.

== See also ==
- House of Ilok
- John of Capistrano
- Banate of Macsó
- Banate of Belgrade
