= Stephen Kórógyi =

Hungarian lord

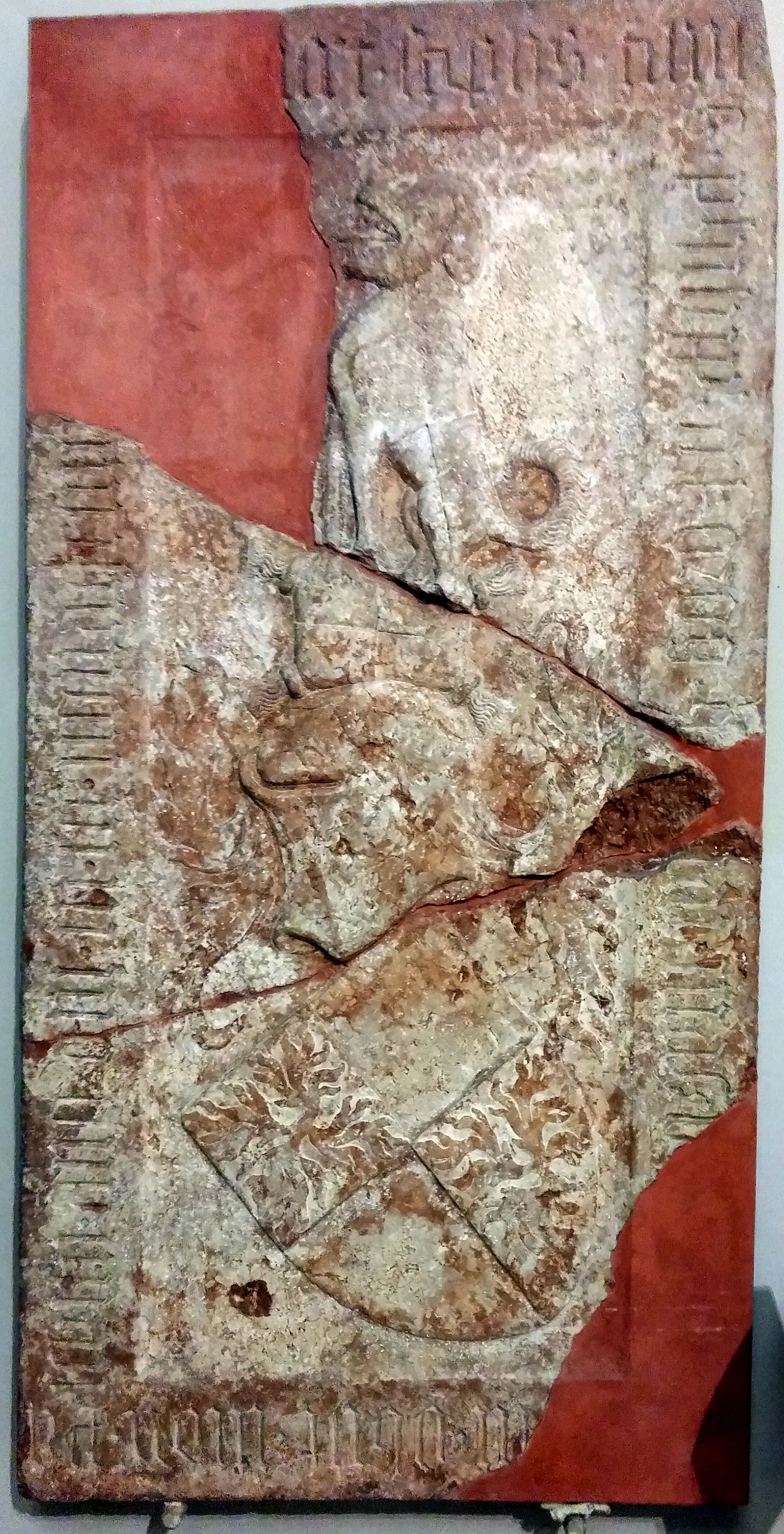
- Fragments of Kórógyi's tombstone (1397), discovered and exhibited in the Holy Cross Church and Convent, Osijek

Ban of Macsó
- Reign: 1382–1385; 1394–1397
- Predecessor: Paul Liszkói (1st term); Nicholas Garai (2nd term)
- Successor: John Horvat (1st term); Peter Perényi & John Maróti (2nd term)
- Born: c. 1340
- Died: 26 March 1397
- Buried: Holy Cross Church and Convent, Osijek
- Noble family: House of Kórógyi
- Issue: John III; Ladislaus VI; Philip IX; Nicholas II; Stephen II; Dorothea
- Father: Philip VI Kórógyi
- Mother: Philip's second wife

Stephen Kórógyi (Hungarian: Kórógyi István, Croatian: Stjepan Korođski; c. 1340 – 26 March 1397) was a Hungarian baron and military leader in the second half of the 14th century, who served as Ban of Macsó from 1382 to 1385 and from 1394 to 1397. He was an influential partisan of Queen Mary and King Sigismund during the 1380s' internal conflicts in Hungary. He actively participated in the establishment of the first defense system against the Ottoman Empire.

== Early life ==
Stephen (I) originated from the Kórógyi family, which possessed lands in southern Transdanubia and northern Slavonia, primarily around the town Osijek. He was born in the late 1330s or early 1340s, since he was still a minor in 1352, but in 1358 he already appears as an independent acting person. He was the only known son of Philip (VI) and his unidentified second wife. His half-brothers were Philip (VIII), Ladislaus (IV) and Lawrence (II).

His father Philip (VI) died in 1350 or 1351. In the latter year, King Louis I appointed a royal committee to complete the settlement of Philip's inheritance, which was divided into three parts between Philip (VIII), Ladislaus (IV), and the still minor Stephen (I) – the latter's interests were represented by Philip's widow, i.e. his second wife. The widow had to commit herself to supporting the child Stephen from his part of the income; if she remarried, this part, along with the associated burdens, would revert to Stephen's siblings; and the deceased's family archives were left in the possession of his older sons, since they were the first to have the means. However, since the parties did not submit to these provisions, a new agreement was established on 20 January 1352, at the court of Palatine Nicholas Zsámboki: this time it was decided that Philip's estates, namely Samatovci (Szombattelek), Osijek, Nádasd, Koprivna and Csapa, would be divided into three parts; one part, with Philip's house and buildings in Samatovci, would be owned by his widow and Stephen until the latter became fully fledged and could share it with his brothers; the archives would go to Philip and Ladislaus, with the stipulation, however, that they would make it available to Stephen if necessary. This agreement came into effect since the three brothers jointly purchased their father's portion of the Osijek estate from Guillaume de La Jugie, provost of Titel in 1353. The three brothers were involved in a series of lawsuits against the Cikádor Abbey (in Bátaszék) over the port and market duties in Osijek throughout from 1351 to 1353. The Kórógyi family tried to appropriate this income, but the courts forced them to return it (only the customs duties remained from the Osijek taxes).

Stephen reached adulthood by 1358, when his relative Philip (VII) from the family's Szeglak branch defended his estates and land portions in Baranya and Valkó counties before the cathedral chapter of Pécs against the aspirations of Stephen, who did not hesitate to unlawfully seize them.

== The queens' partisan ==
No information about Kórógyi's activities has survived in the following decades. He served as Master of the doorkeepers from 1381 to 1382, during the last regnal year of Louis I. In this capacity, he also acted as Steward of the Royal Household. After the young Queen Mary ascended the Hungarian throne following her father's death in 1382, Kórógyi's influence and political career soared. He belonged to that baronial league which centered around Palatine Nicholas I Garai and Bishop Bálint Alsáni and supported the aspirations of Mary and her mother, queen dowager Elizabeth against their rivals, who were unwilling to defer to a woman and objected to Mary's accession, maintaining that the lawful heir to the throne was King Charles III of Naples, the only remaining male member of the Capetian House of Anjou. Kórógyi was installed as Ban of Macsó, the southern border province of the kingdom, following Mary's coronation in the autumn of 1382. Beside that, he also administered Bács, Baranya, Bodrog, Syrmia and Valkó counties as part of his dignity's honour.

John of Palisna, Prior of Vrana, rose up in open rebellion against the rule of Mary and her mother in the spring of 1383. It is plausible that Kórógyi was involved in that royal army, which marched to Croatia and laid siege to Vrana, forcing John of Palisna to flee to Bosnia. Upon his request, Queen Mary, with the consent of Elizabeth, donated the lands of the rebellious John of Palisna – including his namesake estate Paližna – laid near Vukovar in Križevci County in Slavonia to Stephen Kórógyi and his sons – John (III), Ladislaus (VI) and Philip (IX) – in July 1384, citing his merits and loyalty, and of his late brothers. Queen Mary styled Kórógyi as a "baron" in her royal charter, reflecting his high social status in the royal court.

After Charles III of Naples stabilized his rule in Southern Italy by late 1384, a formal group centered around John Horvat and his brother, Paul, Bishop of Zagreb, was established in Hungary which supported his claim to Hungary. At the same time, Mary's neglected fiancé, Sigismund tried to persuade the queen mother to consent to his marriage to Mary and his coronation as con-monarch, but she refused him. The queens and their supporters initiated negotiations with the representatives of the opposition, but no reconciliation was reached at their meeting in Požega in the spring of 1385. Kórógyi also participated in the meeting, where the Hungarian nobles decided to break off Mary's engagement with Sigismund in order to preserve peace. Kórógyi supported Mary's engagement with Louis of France in May 1385. However, events accelerated, the Horvats and their allies formally offered the crown to Charles III of Naples and invited him to Hungary in August. Charles landed at Senj in Dalmatia in September 1385 and marched to Zagreb. Their army formally occupied the southern provinces of the realm, including the Banate of Macsó, taking control over the area. Kórógyi was dismissed as ban and was replaced by John Horvat, who, however, had already used the title arbitrarily since at least May 1385.

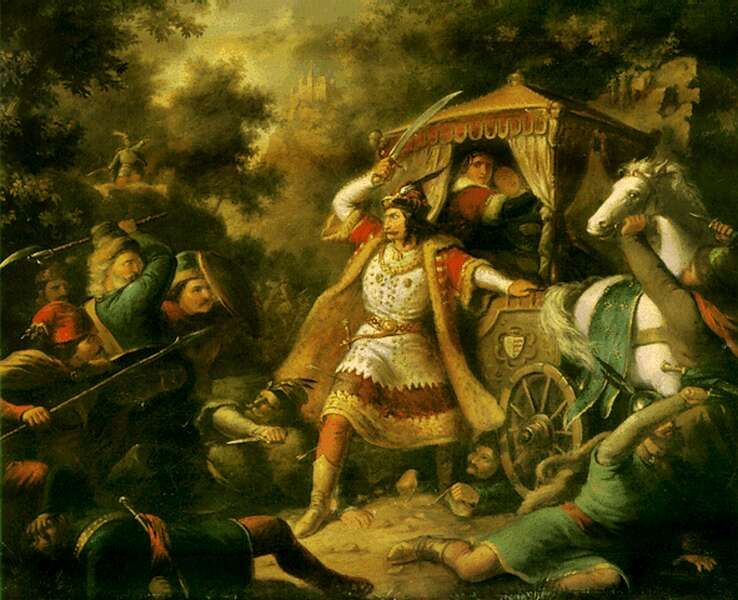
Nicholas Garai defending his sovereign Mary and her mother Elizabeth from the Horvats. By Mihály Kovács.

Kórógyi remained an influential partisan of the queens during the brief reign of Charles II, who was crowned king on the last day of 1385. At the instigation of Queen Elizabeth and Nicholas Garai, a successful assassination attempt was carried out against Charles in February 1386. Mary was restored to the throne, with her mother ruling in her name. However, the Horvat brothers rose up in open rebellion on behalf of the murdered king's son, Ladislaus of Naples. They ransacked and seized Požega, Valkó and Syrmia counties and occupied the territory of the Banate of Macsó. In the spring of 1386, the queens ordered Kórógyi to gather an army and annihilate the Horvats' domain. Kórógyi's troops marched into the southern province of the kingdom and defeated the army of Ladislaus Horvat, which was also supported by auxiliary forces sent by King Tvrtko I of Bosnia and Prince Lazar of Serbia, in several battles, capturing the forts Belgrade, Kulpin (Kölpény) and Bitva. However, the queens' rule in the entire banate failed to consolidate, as the military fortunes soon turned: Kórógyi, who was then fighting only at the head of his own banderium and was entrusted with the defense of the region, was defeated by the arriving John of Palisna together with the Horvat brothers, allegedly in superior force, and forced him back to the left bank of the Sava. In retaliation, the Horvat forces, which also recruited mercenaries, destroyed and looted the landholdings of Kórógyi and other supporters of the queens in Požega and Valkó counties. Osijek was also attacked and looted by the pro-Ladislaus neighboring lords, including Kórógyi's relative, Ladislaus (V) from the family's Szeglak branch, and Sigismund Nekcsei. While the enemy was already considering crossing the Drava, Kórógyi received military reinforcements in the person of the queens' other barons. Their joint army successfully routed the Horvat forces near the town Požega along the Drava.

Queen Elizabeth believed that her daughter's mere presence would help calm the opposition in Slavonia and Croatia. It is likely that the royal court significantly overestimated Kórógyi's victory over the rebels. Accompanied by Nicholas Garai and a modest following, including Kórógyi, Elizabeth and Mary set out for Đakovo in mid-July 1386. Croatian historian Ive Mažuran considered that the royal entourage crossed the Drava at Osijek, where the Kórógyis accommodated them. Elizabeth had seriously misjudged the situation. On 25 July 1386, they were ambushed en route and attacked by John Horvat, John of Palisna and their retainers near Gorjani (Gara). Their small entourage failed to fight off the attackers. They fought the attackers, but all were massacred or captured. Nicholas Garai and Blaise Forgách (Charles' assassin) were killed by the rebels and their heads were sent to Charles's widow Margaret, while the queens were imprisoned in the bishop of Zagreb's castle of Gomnec, and later the Novigrad Castle on the coast of the Adriatic Sea. Stephen Kórógyi was among those nobles, who were captured and transferred to the fort Počitelj in the Lika region, which was a stronghold of John of Palisna.

== Sigismund's baron ==
Kórógyi was held in captivity until May 1387. During this time, significant changes took place in Hungary; The barons of the realm installed Sigismund of Luxembourg as regent. In January 1387, he invaded Slavonia, but could not defeat the rebels. In the same month, John Horvat's henchmen strangled Queen Elizabeth in Mary's presence. Sigismund was crowned king in March. Kórógyi was liberated, when Sigismund's supporter, Ivan V Krk besieged and captured the fort of Počitelj in May 1387. Kórógyi swore loyalty to the new monarch and joined the royal campaign which aimed to expel the rebels from Slavonia. From June, he led the royal army in battles against John Horvat in Baranya and Slavonia, and then defeated the rebels at Pobosuć. During the fighting, he captured several rebel leaders, Berislav of Palisna, Ladislaus Szeglaki (his relative), and Stephen "Kont" Hédervári while the remaining rebel army retreated to Bosnia.

Kórógyi became a mainstay of Sigismund's reign thereafter. He was granted the royal land Cseri in Temes County (laid near present-day Sacoșu Turcesc, Romania) from Sigismund already in August 1387. There, Kórógyi's descendants built a castle in the upcoming decades. King Sigismund donated the castle of Harsány (Szársomlyó) in Baranya County for his merits to Kórógyi in 1388. During this act, he was also granted the estate Baranyavár (present-day Branjin Vrh, Croatia) with its fortified manor. Kórógyi served as ispán of Keve and Krassó counties in 1389. Kórógyi participated in the royal campaign against Moravian Serbia in the autumn of 1389, which later proved to be first stage of the wider Hungarian–Ottoman War. He was present during the sieges of Borač és Čestin; both forts laid near present-day Kragujevac. Following its capture, the king entrusted Borač to Peter Gyulaházi, Kórógyi's familiaris. During the 1389 campaign, Sigismund donated the estate Németi (present-day a borough of Szalánta) with its accessories (including portions in Nemetin, Asszonyfalva, Kovászd, Mocsár and Szilköz) in Baranya County in exchange for Paližna to Kórógyi and his three elder sons, after the king confiscated them from the disgraced Lack de Szántó family.

He also participated in the 1390 royal campaign to Serbia, after Turkish and Serbian incursions into Syrmia, where Kórógyi also possessed lands and served as ispán of Krassó County. He remained a member of the royal household too; he was styled as relator in late 1390 and acted as a co-judge beside the monarch in March 1391. In these years, Stephen acquired those lands, which once belonged to the disgraced Szeglaki family; he secured Karanac in 1390, and the castle of Kos with the surrounding villages (including Csapa) in 1392 for himself and his descendants. A group of nobles from Beli Manastir disputed Kórógyis' right to Karanac in 1392, but Sigismund confirmed their right to the estate that same year. In April 1391, Queen Mary confirmed Kórógyi as co-owner of the fort Bijela Stijena (Fejérkő) in Križevci County. However, he unsuccessfully tried to regain Tizin (Tyzin) estate for his kinship, which Sigismund gave to the Alsáni family.

When Sigismund launched an expedition in the summer of 1394 to the southern border to inflict a final defeat on the rebels, the supporters of Ladislaus of Naples, the monarch visited Osijek, where the Kórógyis welcomed him. It is possible that Stephen Kórógyi also took part in the campaign, when the Dobor Fortress was besieged and captured and John Horvat was taken prisoner. Around that time, Kórógyi was appointed Ban of Macsó for the second time; he held the office alongside Nicholas Treutel. Beside that, they also administered Bács, Baranya, Bodrog, Syrmia and Valkó counties as part of their dignity's honour. When Kórógyi returned the confiscated estates to the Lack de Szántó family after they received royal pardon, Sigismund granted half of the estate of Ivánkaszentgyörgy (Ivankovo) in Valkó County to Kórógyi as compensation in 1394. It is possible that Stephen Kórógyi and his son, John participated in the Crusade of Nicopolis in the summer-autumn 1396. Kórógyi was replaced as Ban of Macsó sometime between 25 February or 5 March 1397, shortly before his death which took place the latter month. It is possible that he died of wounds received in the Battle of Nicopolis. He is first mentioned as a deceased person in August 1397.

== Personal life ==
Stephen Kórógyi married an unidentified noblewoman, who was a third-degree relative of him. Therefore, a special permission from Pope Urban VI was required posteriorly to legalize the marriage in 1389. To raise the money for the dispensation, Kórógyi sold his estate Szamoskórógy (Corod) in Transylvania. According to a letter, Kórógyi and his wife also offered the Roman Curia a quarter of their dowry and wedding gifts, which they would use to marry off poor girls. The papal letter refers to Kórógyi's wife as a resident of the diocese of Pécs. She was still alive in 1401.

Their marriage produces five sons – John (III), Ladislaus (VI), Philip (IX), Nicholas (II) and Stephen (II) –, and a daughter Dorothea. The eldest son John served as Master of the horse between 1395 and 1396, during his father's lifetime. Philip, also known as Philpus, held various positions in the court of Sigismund and he was the first indigenous magnate who bore the title count in Hungary after the adoption of his title Count of Castell received royal approval. Stephen (II) was among the magnates, i.e. he was a member of the royal council in 1427. The only daughter Dorothea married Peter Atyinai (died in 1418) from the gens (clan) Aba; they had no descendants.

Kórógyi died on 26 March 1397, Easter Sunday. He was buried in the Holy Cross Church and Convent in Osijek. The fragments of his tombstone, which depicts the family coat-of-arms (a squared shield with a dog on its crest), were excavated in 1960 and 1993. Its fragmentary inscription is "[hic ia]cet steph(anu)s filius philipp(i) de korog q[ondam banus] de maczh[o] ... q[ui] obyt in die paschini an(n)o d(omi)ni M CCC nonagesim[o septo]". The Croatian historiography claims that this tombstone belonged to his brother Philip, who allegedly died in 1394 (however, in fact, he was already dead in 1363).

== Sources ==
- Brkanić, Monika (2026). "Bračne veze obitelji Korođski [Marriage Alliances of the Family of Kórógy]". Osijeker Sammelband (in Croatian). 41. Muzej Slavonije Osijek: 9–15. ISSN 0473-4882.
- Brkanić, Monika; Njari, Denis (2025). "Pregled službi i funkcija plemića Korođskih unutar vladarskog aparata srednjovjekovnog Ugarsko-Hrvatskog Kraljevstva" [An Overview of the Offices and Roles of the Noble Lords of Kórógy within the Governance Apparatus of the Medieval Kingdom of Hungary–Croatia]. In Bockovac, Tímea; Grgić, Stipica; Lehocki-Samardžić, Ana; Varga, Szabolcs (eds.). Otthon két hazában. Ünnepi tanulmánykötet Sokcsevits Dénes tiszteletére / Dom(a) u obje domovine. Zbornik radova u čast Dinka Šokčevića [At home in Two Countries. A Celebratory Volume of Studies in Honor of Dénes Sokcsevits] (in Croatian). Magyarországi Horvát Oktatásért Alapítvány / Zaklada za hrvatsko školstvo u Mađarskoj, Glotta Nyelvi Intézet / Institut za jezik Glotta, Horvát Történettudományi Intézet / Hrvatski institut za povijest, ELTE HTK Történettudományi Kutatóintézet / Institut za istraživanje povijesti Centra za istraživanje humanističkih znanosti Sveučilišta Eötvös Loránd. pp. 157–167. ISBN 978-615-02-5447-0.
- Engel, Pál (1996). Magyarország világi archontológiája, 1301–1457, I. [Secular Archontology of Hungary, 1301–1457, Volume I] (in Hungarian). História, MTA Történettudományi Intézete. ISBN 963-8312-44-0.
- Engel, Pál (1998). "A török-magyar háborúk első évei, 1389–1392 [The First Years of the Ottoman–Hungarian Wars, 1389–1392]". Hadtörténelmi Közlemények (in Hungarian). 111 (3). Hadtörténeti Intézet és Múzeum: 555–577. ISSN 0017-6540.
- Krantzieritz, Károly (2015). "A nikápolyi csata magyar résztvevői [Hungarian participants of the Battle of Nicopolis]". Hadtörténelmi Közlemények (in Hungarian). 128 (1). Hadtörténeti Intézet és Múzeum: 162–183. ISSN 0017-6540.
- Lővei, Pál (2009). Posuit hoc monumentum pro aeterna memoria: Bevezető fejezetek a középkori Magyarország síremlékeinek katalógusához [Posuit hoc monumentum pro aeterna memoria: Introductory Chapters to the Catalogue of the Tombs of Medieval Hungary] (in Hungarian). Doctoral thesis.
- Mažuran, Ive (1994). Srednjovjekovni i turski Osijek [Medieval and Turkish Osijek] (in Croatian). Zavod za znanstveni rad HAZU u Osijeku, Gradsko poglavarstvo Osijek, Školska knjiga Zagreb. ISBN 953-154-040-3.
- Mujadžević, Dino (2009). "Korođski, Stjepan I.". Croatian Biographical Lexicon (in Croatian). Miroslav Krleža Lexicographical Institute.
- Süttő, Szilárd (2003). Anjou-Magyarország alkonya I–II. [The Twilight of Angevin Hungary] (in Hungarian). Belvedere Meridionale. ISBN 963-86387-0-2.
- Wertner, Mór (1892). "Családtörténeti adalékok. Az első Kórógyiak [Family History Additions. The First Kórógyis]". Turul (in Hungarian). 10: 166–172. ISSN 1216-7258.

Stephen I House of Kórógyi Born: c. 1340 Died: 26 March 1397
Political offices
Preceded by Paul Liszkói	Master of the doorkeepers 1381–1382	Succeeded by Nicholas Telegdi
Preceded by Paul Liszkói	Ban of Macsó; 1382–1385	Succeeded by John Horvat
Preceded by Nicholas Garai	Ban of Macsó alongside Nicholas Treutel; 1394–1397	Succeeded by Peter Perényi & John Maróti
