= Banate of Belgrade =

1427–1521 banate of the Kingdom of Hungary

Banate of Belgrade Београдска бановина Beogradska banovina Nándorfehérvári bánság
- Banate of the Kingdom of Hungary
- 1427–1521
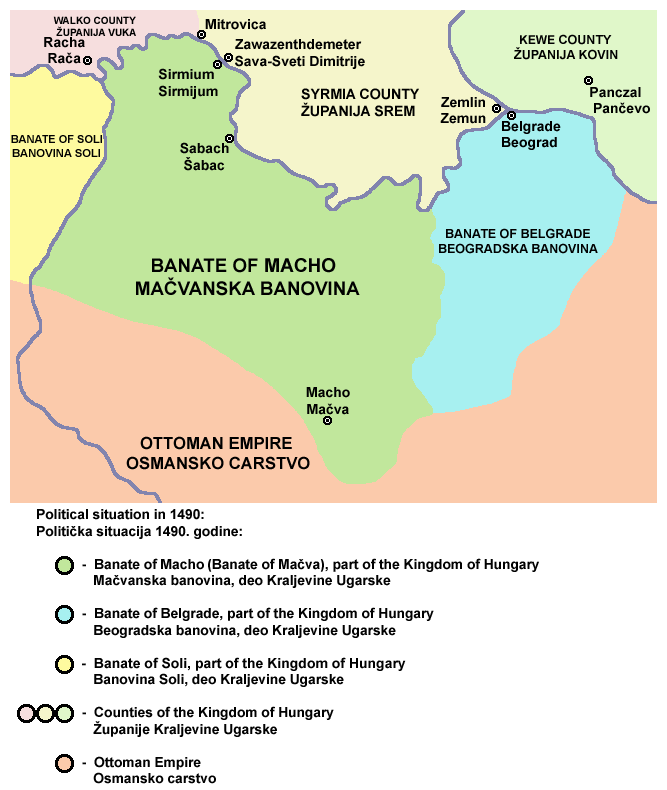
- Banate of Belgrade in 1490
- History
  - Established: 1427
  - Disestablished: 1521
Preceded by	Succeeded by
Serbian Despotate	Sanjak of Smederevo
- Today part of: Serbia

The Banate of Belgrade (Serbian: Београдска бановина / Beogradska banovina, Hungarian: Nándorfehérvári bánság) was a frontier province (banate) of the medieval Kingdom of Hungary, centered in Belgrade (modern Serbia). During the second half of the 15th century, and up to 1521, it had a significant role in the anti-Ottoman defensive system of the Kingdom of Hungary.

== History ==
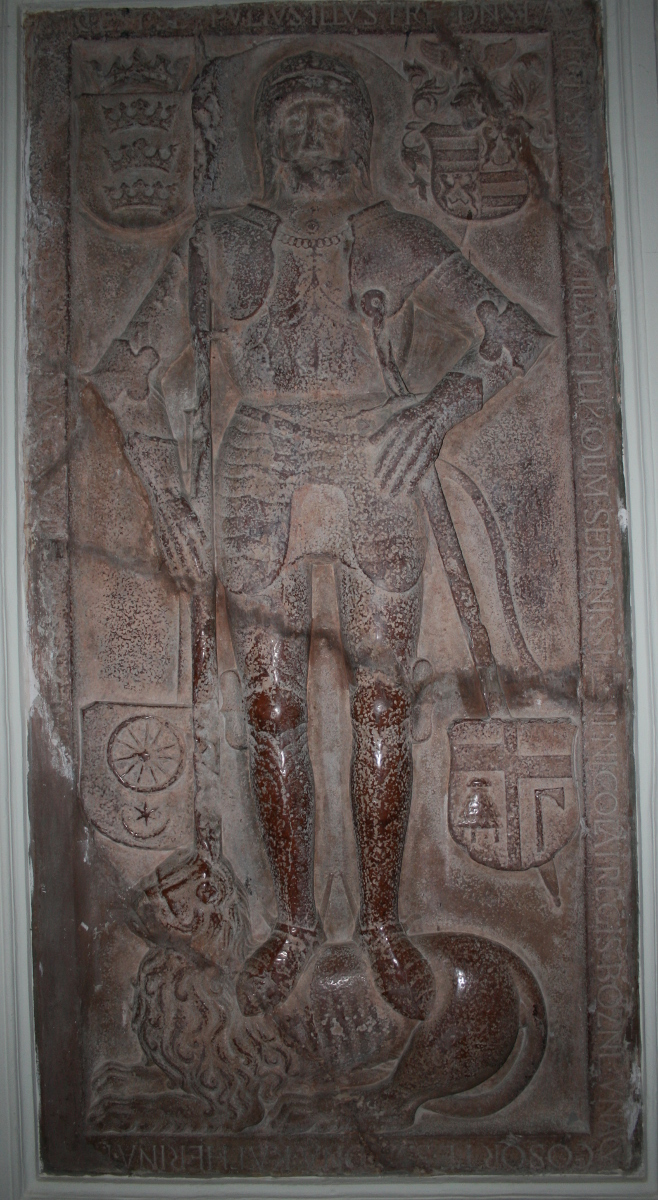
Gravestone of Lawrence of Ilok, Ban of Belgrade (1511–1513)

Prior to 1427, Belgrade had been the capital of the Serbian Despotate. After Serbian despot Stefan Lazarević died in the summer of 1427, his successor Đurađ Branković was forced to transfer Belgrade to the Kingdom of Hungary and to move his capital to Smederevo.

At first, Hungarian kings created the Captaincy of Belgrade, headed by a military commander (captain) in charge of the frontier region (lat. capitaneus belgradensis, or capitaneus nandoralbensis). In 1440, Belgrade was besieged by Ottomans, but the city was successfully defended.

In 1456, the Ottoman army tried to conquer Belgrade for the second time, but failed again.

After the annexation of the Serbian Despotate by the Ottomans in 1459, further Ottoman expansion was directed towards Captaincy of Belgrade and neighboring Banate of Mačva.

By the end of the 15th century, captains of Belgrade were replaced by bans (lat. banus belgradensis, or banus nandoralbensis), and thus the Banate of Belgrade was created. Ban of Belgrade also had a deputy, titled viceban of Belgrade. Finally, in 1521, the Ottoman army conquered Belgrade, which also marked the end of the Banate of Belgrade, and the region was subsequently incorporated into the Ottoman Sanjak of Smederevo.

Among more notable captains and bans of Belgrade were: Matko Talovac, Jovan Talovac, Michael Szilágyi, Peter Dóczy, Lawrence of Ilok.

== See also ==
- Siege of Belgrade (1456)
- Siege of Belgrade (1521)
- History of Belgrade
- History of Serbia
- Banate of Mačva
- Kingdom of Hungary (1301–1526)

== Sources ==
- Ćirković, Sima (2004). The Serbs. Malden: Blackwell Publishing. ISBN 9781405142915.
- Engel, Pál (2001). The Realm of St. Stephen: A History of Medieval Hungary, 895-1526. London & New York: I.B.Tauris. ISBN 9781850439776.
- Fine, John Van Antwerp Jr. (1994) [1987]. The Late Medieval Balkans: A Critical Survey from the Late Twelfth Century to the Ottoman Conquest. Ann Arbor, Michigan: University of Michigan Press. ISBN 0472082604.
- Fodor, Pál; Dávid, Géza, eds. (2000). Ottomans, Hungarians, and Habsburgs in Central Europe: The Military Confines in the Era of Ottoman Conquest. Leiden: Brill. ISBN 9004119078.
- Isailović, Neven (2016). "Living by the Border: South Slavic Marcher Lords in the Late Medieval Balkans (13th–15th Centuries)" (PDF). Banatica. 26 (2): 105–117. Archived from the original on 2025-05-08.
- Ivanović, Miloš; Isailović, Neven (2015). "The Danube in Serbian-Hungarian Relations in the 14th and 15th Centuries" (PDF). Tibiscvm: Istorie–Arheologie. 5: 377–393. Archived from the original on 2024-08-01.
- Pálosfalvi, Tamás (2018). From Nicopolis to Mohács: A History of Ottoman-Hungarian Warfare, 1389-1526. Leiden: Brill. ISBN 9789004375659.
- Popović, Marko (2018). "Siege of Belgrade in 1521 and restoration of fortifications after conquest". Belgrade: 1521-1867. Belgrade: The Institute of History. pp. 5–25.
- Spremić, Momčilo (2014). "Le Despote Stefan Lazarević et Sieur Djuradj Branković" (PDF). Balcanica. 45: 145–163.
