= Syrmia County (medieval) =

Administrative unit of Kingdom of Hungary in the Middle Ages

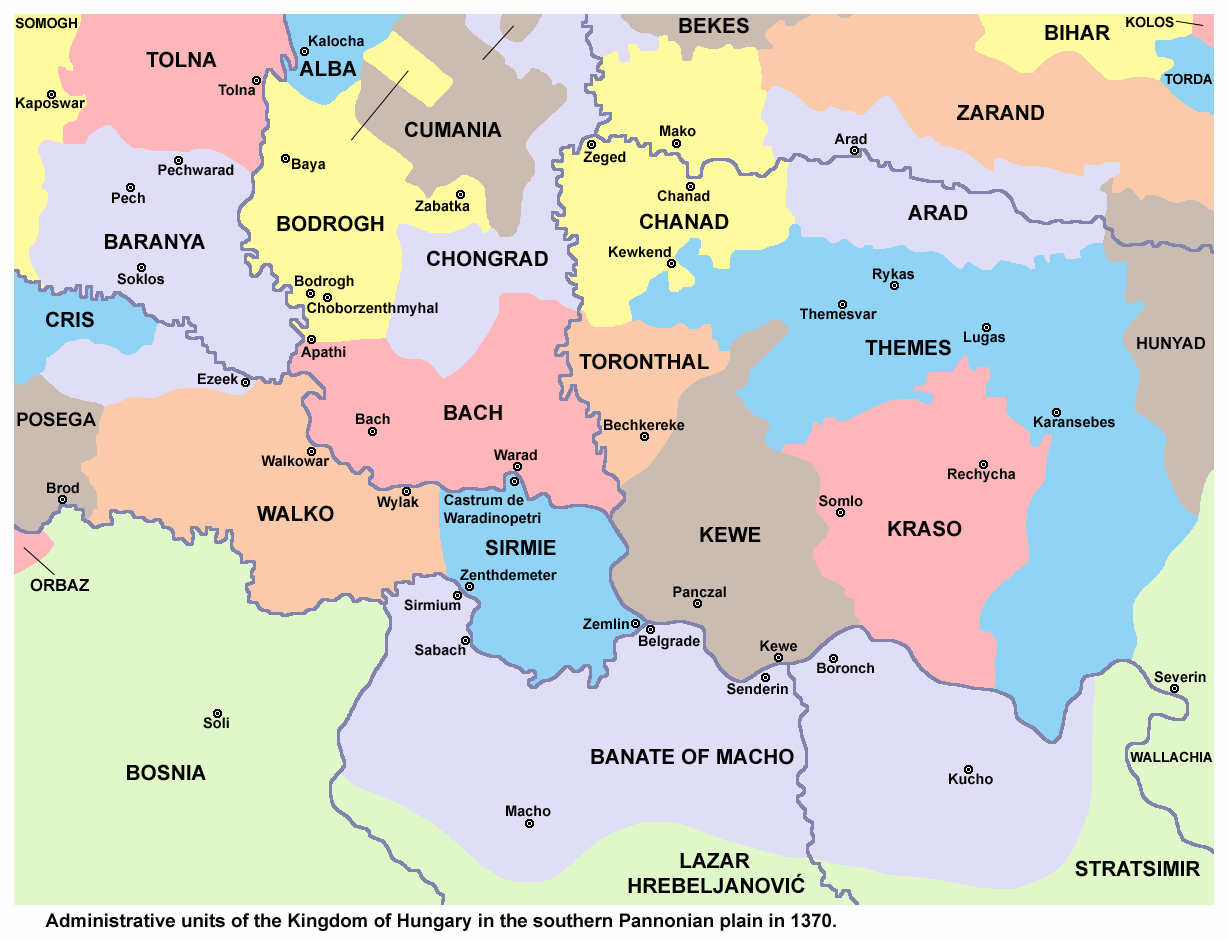
Administrative units in the south of the Kingdom of Hungary in 1370. Syrmia in the centre in blue.

The Syrmia County (Hungarian: Szerém vármegye, Croatian: Srijemska županija, Serbian: Сремска жупанија / Sremska županija) was an administrative unit (county) of the medieval Kingdom of Hungary in the Middle Ages. It was established in the 13th century, and included most of what is today Serbian Syrmia. It was subordinated to the Banate of Macsó. It was conquered by the Ottomans in 1526.

== Geography ==
The medieval county was situated east of the Laćarak–Susek line and east of the neighbouring Vukovar County in modern-day Croatia, and as it was surrounded by the Danube and Sava rivers, except for in the west, it was regarded an island. The county borders largely correspond to the modern-day Srem District in northwestern Serbia.

== History ==
The Theme of Sirmium was taken over by the Hungarians in the late 11th century, and Syrmia became contested between the Byzantines and Hungarians over the century. Manuel I Komnenos retrieved Syrmia in 1162, defended it in 1167, but latter Emperors lost it to former imperial Despot and sovereign King of Hungary, Béla III, sometime during the 1180s. Its governorship was placed under that of the Banate of Macsó in the 13th century.

Up until January 1229, the Syrmia County was, in an ecclesiastical sense, subordinated as an archdiocese to the Archbishopric of Kalocsa. Then, Pope Gregory IX permitted the establishment of a new bishopric with seat in Bánmonostor (present-day Banoštor).

After Serbian ruler Stefan Dragutin entered dynastic relations with Hungary, he received in 1284, among other territories, Belgrade, and Mačva, which was known as ulterior Sirmia in Papal documents. Dragutin was known as the "Syrmian king". The Syrmia County was often mentioned in Hungarian charters during Stefan Dragutin's reign in "Syrmia" (1284–1316), as a county in which the kings gave estates to its nobility. At the time when the Syrmia County was ostensibly under Serbian rule, Charles I of Hungary was active in it twice, issuing charters on 1 September 1308 in Pétervárad (present-day Petrovaradin), and in February 1314 in Szávaszentdemeter (present-day Sremska Mitrovica) and Pétervárad.

Syrmia was conquered by the Ottomans three decades after their conquest of Macsó in 1496, with the Battle of Mohács (1526) that led to the collapse of Hungary, and Ottoman rule in Pannonia, and subsequently, further into Europe.

== Counts ==
The head of the county was titled ispán (Slavic: župan) — count (comes).

Count(s)	Monarch
Paul Garai (1323–1328)	Charles I
John Alsáni (1328–1334)	Charles I
Nicholas Ostffy (1335–1339)	Charles I
Dominic Ostffy (1340–1353)	Charles I, Louis I
Andrew Lackfi (1353–1354)	Louis I
Nicholas Csák (1354–1359)	Louis I
Nicholas I Garai (1359–1375)	Louis I
John Horvat (1375–1381)	Louis I
Paul Liszkói (1381–1382)	Louis I
Stephen Kórógyi (1382–1385)	Mary
John Horvat (1385–1386)	Mary, Charles II
John Bánfi de Alsólendva (1386–1387)	Mary
Nicholas II Garai (1387–1390)	Sigismund
Stephen Losonci (1390–1392)	Sigismund
George Lackfi (1392–1393)	Sigismund
Nicholas II Garai (1394)	Sigismund
Nicholas Treutel and Stephen Kórógyi (1394–1397)	Sigismund
Péter Perényi and John Maróti (1397)	Sigismund
Francis Bebek (1397–1400) and John Maróti (1398–1402) and Péter Perényi (1400–1401)	Sigismund
Stephen Ludányi and Thomas Ludányi (1402)	Sigismund
Ladislaus Újlaki (1402–1403) and John Maróti (1402–1410)	Sigismund
Ladislaus Újlaki and Emeric Újlaki (1410–1418)	Sigismund
Desiderius Garai (1419–1427)	Sigismund
John Maróti (1427–1428)	Sigismund
Peter Cseh de Léva (1427–1431) and Stephen Újlaki (1429–1430)	Sigismund
Ladislaus Garai (1431–1441) and Desiderius Garai (1431–1438) and Nicholas Újlaki (1438–1458)	Sigismund, Albert

== Sources ==
- Bataković, Dušan T., ed. (2005). Histoire du peuple serbe [History of the Serbian People] (in French). Lausanne: L’Age d’Homme. ISBN 9782825119587.
- Ćirković, Sima (2004). The Serbs. Malden: Blackwell Publishing. ISBN 9781405142915.
- Engel, Pál (2001). The Realm of St. Stephen: A History of Medieval Hungary, 895-1526. London & New York: I.B.Tauris. ISBN 9781850439776.
- Fine, John Van Antwerp Jr. (1991) [1983]. The Early Medieval Balkans: A Critical Survey from the Sixth to the Late Twelfth Century. Ann Arbor, Michigan: University of Michigan Press. ISBN 0472081497.
- Fine, John Van Antwerp Jr. (1994) [1987]. The Late Medieval Balkans: A Critical Survey from the Late Twelfth Century to the Ottoman Conquest. Ann Arbor, Michigan: University of Michigan Press. ISBN 0472082604.
- Fodor, Pál; Dávid, Géza, eds. (2000). Ottomans, Hungarians, and Habsburgs in Central Europe: The Military Confines in the Era of Ottoman Conquest. Leiden: BRILL. ISBN 9004119078.
- Isailović, Neven (2016). "Living by the Border: South Slavic Marcher Lords in the Late Medieval Balkans (13th–15th Centuries)". Banatica. 26 (2): 105–117.
- Ivanović, Miloš; Isailović, Neven (2015). "The Danube in Serbian-Hungarian Relations in the 14th and 15th Centuries". Tibiscvm: Istorie–Arheologie. 5: 377–393.
- Jireček, Constantin (1911). Geschichte der Serben. Vol. 1. Gotha: Perthes.
- Jireček, Constantin (1918). Geschichte der Serben. Vol. 2. Gotha: Perthes.
- Krstić, Aleksandar R. (2016). "The Rival and the Vassal of Charles Robert of Anjou: King Vladislav II Nemanjić". Banatica. 26 (2): 33–51.
- Makk, Ferenc (1989). The Árpáds and the Comneni: Political Relations between Hungary and Byzantium in the 12th century (Translated by György Novák). Akadémiai Kiadó. ISBN 963-05-5268-X.
- McDaniel, Gordon L. (1984). "On Hungarian-Serbian Relations in the Thirteenth Century: John Angelos and Queen Jelena" (PDF). Ungarn-Jahrbuch. 12 (1982-1983): München, 1984: 43–50.
- Moravcsik, Gyula (1970). Byzantium and the Magyars. Budapest: Akadémiai Kiadó.
- Pálosfalvi, Tamás (2018). From Nicopolis to Mohács: A History of Ottoman-Hungarian Warfare, 1389-1526. Leiden: BRILL. ISBN 9789004375659.
- Popović, Dušan J. (1990). Srbi u Vojvodini. Vol. 1. Matica srpska. p. 53. ISBN 9788636301746.
- Istorisko društvo NR Srbije (1931). Stanoje Stanojević (ed.). Glasnik. Vol. 4. p. 11.
