= Banate of Macsó =

Former banate in the Kingdom of Hungary

Banate of Macsó Banate of Mačva Macsói bánság Banatus Machoviensis Мачванска бановина Mačvanska banovina
- Banate of the Kingdom of Hungary
- 1272–1284 1319–1496
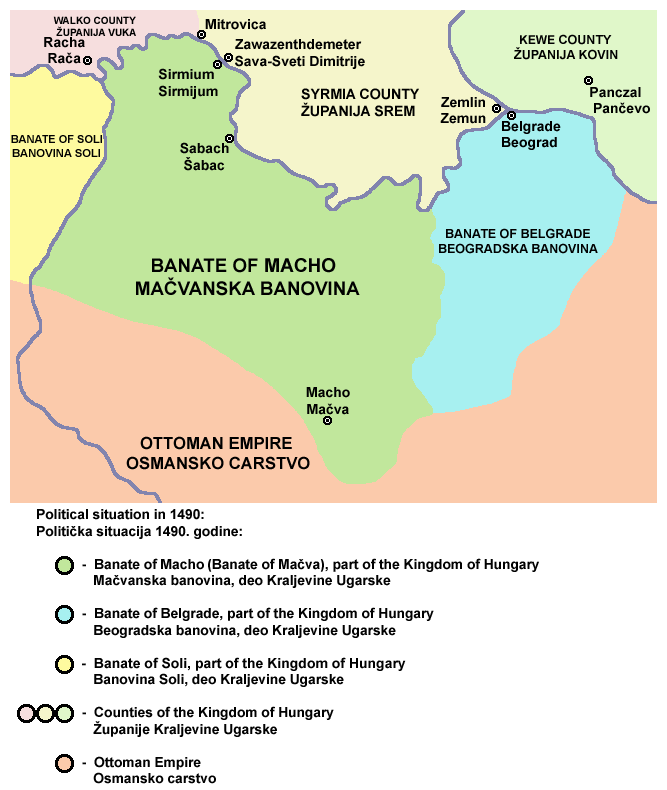
- The Banate of Macsó in 1490
- History
  - Established: 1272
  - Disestablished: 1496
Preceded by	Succeeded by
Theme of Sirmium	Kingdom of Serbia (medieval); Sanjak of Zvornik
- Today part of: Serbia

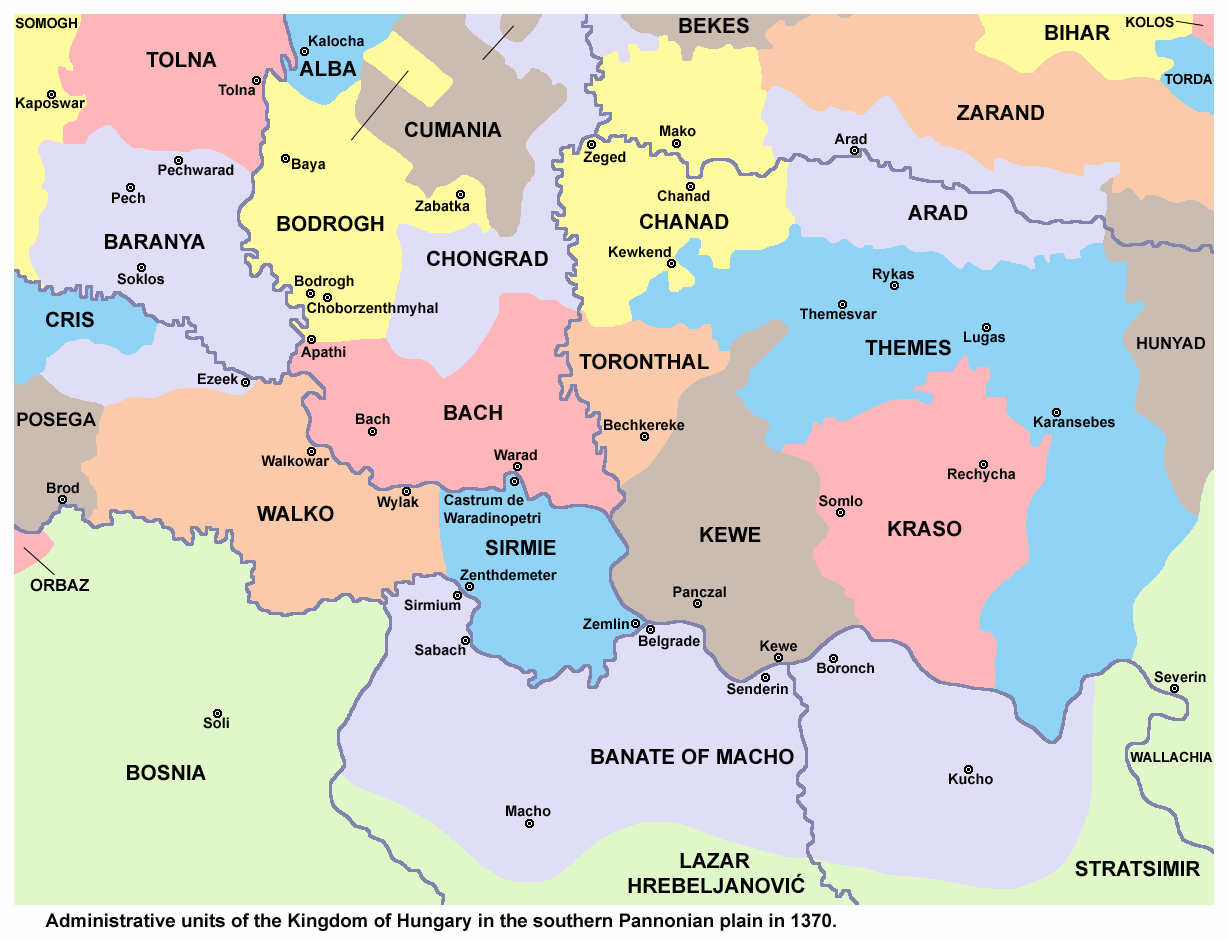
Banate of Macsó in 1370

The Banate of Macsó or the Banate of Mačva (Hungarian: macsói bánság, Serbian: Мачванска бановина / Mačvanska banovina) was an administrative division (banate) of the medieval Kingdom of Hungary, that existed between the 13th and 15th centuries, and was located in the present-day region of Mačva, in modern Serbia.

== Name ==
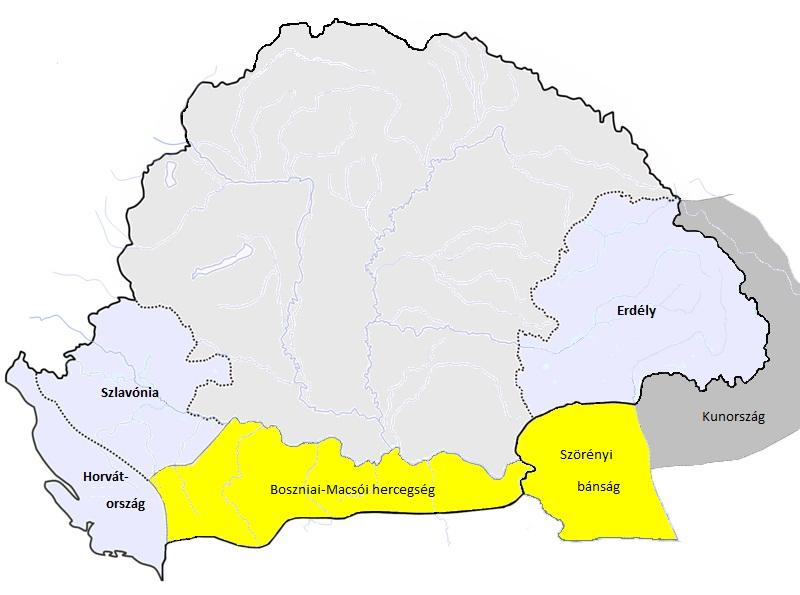
Kingdom of Hungary in the 13th century with the Principality of Macsó.

In Serbian: Mačvanska banovina (Serbian Cyrillic: Мачванска бановина), Latin: Banatus Machoviensis, Hungarian: Macsói bánság. The banate was named after a town called Macsó (Mačva or Macho), but the location of this settlement has not been clearly established in modern times. It is suspected that the town existed a few kilometers down the river Sava from modern Šabac.

== History ==
The region of Mačva or Macsó came under Hungarian administration shortly after the death of Byzantine emperor Manuel I Comnenus (1180), but it was returned to emperor Isaac II Angelos upon conclusion of Byzantine-Hungarian alliance (1185). It was retaken by Hungarians (c. 1200) and later administered as part of the feudal domain of duke John Angelos of Syrmia. During that time, the region of Mačva was also known as the Lower Syrmia (lat. Sirmia ulterior).

Further Hungarian expansion in the Balkans was interrupted by the Tatar invasion in 1241-1241. The Balkan regions only became the focus of Hungarian foreign policy after 1246-1247. Exiled Russian prince Rostislav Mikhailovich became son-in-law of Hungarian king Béla IV, and was appointed as Ban of Slavonia by 1247. From 1254 onward he was also mentioned as the Lord of Macsó (in Latin, Dominus de Macho). One of his sons, Béla of Macsó ruled as duke over Mačva, while the other son, Michael of Bosnia, ruled over Usora and Soli (regions across Drina river in today's northeastern Bosnia). By that time, Macsó became apple of discord between the Kingdom of Hungary and the Kingdom of Serbia. King Stephen Uroš I of Serbia tried to conquer it in 1268, but was defeated and captured by the Hungarians. Duke Bela ruled over Mačva until death in 1272.

=== The Banate ===
In 1272, after the death of Hungarian king Stephen V, the strengthening of the defensive character of southern borders became a priority, and several new frontier districts (banates) were established to the south of rivers Sava and Danube. The first ban of Macsó was appointed in the same year, thus marking the beginning of the Banate of Macsó, that was governed by several powerful bans, appointed by the kings of Hungary.

Already in 1284, the former king Stephen Dragutin of Serbia (1276-1282), who was married to princess Catherine of Hungary, received Belgrade and Macsó from his brother-in-law, king Ladislaus IV of Hungary, and kept those regions until death in 1316.

During the Interregnum after the death of Hungarian king Andrew III (1301), the central power in the Kingdom of Hungary collapsed, Stephen Dragutin ruled over an independent realm centered in Belgrade and Macsó, which also included regions of Usora and Soli in northern Bosnia, as well as Rudnik and Braničevo. His realm was known as the Kingdom of Syrmia (Srem), and Stephen Dragutin ruled it as king until his death in 1316.

Macsó remained in the hands of Dragutin's son Stephen Vladislaus II until 1319. The northern part of the region along the river Sava was captured by King Charles I of Hungary while the southern part remained firmly under Serbian administration.

In the 14th century, the bans of the Garai family (Paul I Garai, Nicholas I Garai and his son Nicholas II Garai) expanded their rule not only to Bosnia but also to Upper Syrmia and the last one also became the ban of Slavonia and Croatia, which were also parts of the Kingdom of Hungary at the time.

In the 1370s it was captured by Serbian Prince Lazar who in 1377–1378 donated several villages in Macsó to his newly founded monastery of Ravanica. Lazars's son despot Stefan Lazarević was officially granted with possession of Macsó by King Sigismund of Hungary in 1403 as a vassal of the Hungarian ruler. The territory got back to Hungary with Lazarević's death (1427). The Hungarian bans of Macsó existed during this period as well but only as titular holders and the title of ban was usually granted to the ispáns (counts) of southern counties of the Kingdom of Hungary.

The territory was conquered by the Ottomans around 1459, after the fall of the Serbian Despotate. The region was regained for the Kingdom of Hungary in 1476, when the fortress of Zaslon (modern Šabac) was taken. By the end of the 15th century, title of ban was transferred to commanders of Belgrade, thus creating the Banate of Belgrade, that existed until final Ottoman conquest of Belgrade and Šabac in 1521.

== Administrative divisions ==
According to the Treaty of Tata in 1426 Macsó was divided into several districts:

- Bitva (Bytthwa),
- Gornja and Donja Obna (Felsewatna and Alsowatna),
- Rađevina (Radio, Ragy),
- Nepričava (Neprichow),
- Ljig (Ligh),
- Kolubara (Collubara),
- Ub (Ubmelek),
- Tamnava (Tamlavamelek),
- Rabas,
- Pepeljevac,
- Debrc,
- Beljin,
- Toplica and
- castle of Bela Stena (castle) near present-day Valjevo.

== Population ==
The population was mostly Serb and Orthodox, seen in a letter of pope Gregory IX dating 1229, where the pope had ordered the Archbishop of Kalocsa to convert the Orthodox Slavs in Lower Syrmia to the Roman rite.

== List of bans ==
Term	Incumbent	Monarch	Notes
1254–1262	Rostislav	Béla IV	"dominus de Machou"; king Béla IV's son-in-law; he might have been in office since 1247
1262–1272	Béla	Béla IV; Stephen V	"dux de Machou"; son of Rostislav; murdered in 1272
1272–1273	Roland	Ladislaus IV	gens Rátót; first ban; also palatine (1272–1273)
1273	Egidius	Ladislaus IV	first rule; gens Monoszló; also ban of Bosnia (1273)
1273	John	Ladislaus IV	
1273	Egidius	Ladislaus IV	second rule; gens Monoszló; also ban of Bosnia (1273)
1275 (?)	Albert	Ladislaus IV	gens Ákos; only a non-authentic charter refers to him as ban
1279	Ugrin	Ladislaus IV	"banus et dominus"; gens Csák; also master of the treasury (1277–1279) and ban of Bosnia (1279)
1279–1284	Elizabeth the Cuman	Ladislaus IV	"ducissa de Machou [et de Bozna]"; widow of king Stephen V
1284–1316	Stefan Dragutin	Ladislaus IV; Andrew III; Wenceslaus; Otto; Charles I	vassal of the Hungarian monarch as king of Syrmia; formerly king of Serbia (1276–1282)
1316–1317	Stefan Vladislav II	Charles I	king of Syrmia
1317–1319	Stefan Milutin		king of Serbia; Mačva under Serbian rule
1320–1328	Paul Garai	Charles I	Hungarian rule restored in 1319; also ispán of Bodrog, Valkó (1320–1328) and Syrmia Counties (1323–1328); castellan of Kőszeg
1328–1334	John Alsáni	Charles I	also ispán of Baranya, Bodrog, Syrmia, Valkó (1328–1334) and Bács Counties (1333–1334)
1335–1339	Nicholas Ostffy	Charles I	also ispán of Bács, Baranya, Bodrog, Syrmia and Valkó Counties
1340–1353	Dominic Ostffy	Charles I Louis I	brother of Nicholas Ostffy; also ispán of Bács, Baranya, Syrmia, Valkó and Veszprém Counties
1353–1354	Andrew Lackfi	Louis I	also ispán of Bács, Baranya, Syrmia and Valkó Counties
1354–1359	Nicholas Csák	Louis I	son of Ugrin Csák
1359–1375	Nicholas I Garai	Louis I	also ispán of Bács, Baranya, Bodrog, Syrmia and Valkó Counties
1375–1381	John Horvat	Louis I	first rule; also ispán of Bács, Baranya, Bodrog, Syrmia and Valkó Counties
1381–1382	Paul Liszkói	Louis I	also ispán of Bács, Baranya, Bodrog, Syrmia and Valkó Counties
1382–1385	Stephen Kórógyi	Mary	first rule; also ispán of Bács, Baranya, Bodrog, Syrmia and Valkó Counties
1385–1386	John Horvat	Mary; Charles II	second rule; conspired against Mary; also ispán of Bács, Baranya, Bodrog, Syrmia and Valkó Counties; self-declared ban and regent for anti-king Ladislaus of Naples until 1387
1386–1387	John Bánfi de Alsólendva	Mary	also ispán of Bács, Baranya, Bodrog, Syrmia and Valkó Counties
1387–1390	Nicholas II Garai	Sigismund	first rule; son of Nicholas I Garai; also ispán of Bács, Baranya, Bodrog, Syrmia, Valkó (1387–1390) and Virovitica Counties (1388)
1390–1392	Stephen Losonci	Sigismund	also ispán of Bács, Baranya, Bodrog, Syrmia, Valkó (1390–1392) and Bereg Counties (1391)
1392–1393	George Lackfi	Sigismund	also ispán of Bács, Baranya, Bodrog, Syrmia and Valkó Counties
1393–1394	Nicholas II Garai	Sigismund	second rule; also ispán of Bács, Baranya, Bodrog, Syrmia and Valkó Counties
1394–1397	Nicholas Treutel	Sigismund	also ispán of Bács, Baranya, Bodrog, Syrmia and Valkó Counties
1394–1397	Stephen Kórógyi	Sigismund	second rule; also ispán of Bács, Baranya, Bodrog, Syrmia and Valkó Counties
1397	Peter Perényi	Sigismund	first rule; also ispán of Bács, Baranya, Bodrog, Syrmia, Valkó and Zemplén Counties
1397	John Maróti	Sigismund	first rule; also ispán of Bács, Baranya, Bodrog, Syrmia and Valkó Counties
1397–1400	Francis Bebek	Sigismund	together with John Maróti (1398–1402); also ispán of Bács, Baranya, Bodrog, Syrmia and Valkó Counties
1398–1402	John Maróti	Sigismund	second rule; together with Francis Bebek (1397–1400) and with Peter Perényi (1400–1401); also ispán of Bács, Baranya, Bodrog, Syrmia, Tolna and Valkó Counties
1400–1401	Peter Perényi	Sigismund	second rule; together with John Maróti (1398–1402); also ispán of Bács, Baranya, Bodrog, Syrmia and Valkó Counties
1402	Stephen Ludányi	Sigismund	together with his brother, Thomas Ludányi; also ispán of Bács, Baranya, Bodrog, Syrmia and Valkó Counties
1402	Thomas Ludányi	Sigismund	first rule; together with his brother, Stephen Ludányi; also bishop of Eger (1400–1403); also ispán of Bács, Baranya, Bodrog, Syrmia and Valkó Counties
1402–1403	Ladislaus Újlaki	Sigismund	first rule; together with John Maróti (1402–1410); also ispán of Bács, Baranya, Bodrog, Syrmia, Tolna and Valkó Counties
1402–1410	John Maróti	Sigismund	third rule; together with Ladislaus Újlaki (1402–1403); also ispán of Bács, Baranya, Bodrog, Syrmia, Tolna and Valkó Counties
1403	Thomas Ludányi	Sigismund	second rule; also bishop of Eger (1400–1403); ban for anti-king Ladislaus of Naples
1410–1418	Ladislaus Újlaki	Sigismund	second rule; together with his brother, Emeric Újlaki; also ispán of Bács, Baranya, Bodrog, Syrmia, Tolna and Valkó Counties
1410–1418	Emeric Újlaki	Sigismund	together with his brother, Ladislaus Újlaki; also ispán of Bács, Baranya, Bodrog, Syrmia, Tolna and Valkó Counties
1419–1427	Desiderius Garai	Sigismund	first rule; also ispán of Bács, Baranya, Bodrog, Syrmia, Tolna and Valkó Counties
1427–1428	John Maróti	Sigismund	fourth rule; together with Peter Cseh de Léva (1427–1431); also ispán of Bács, Baranya, Bodrog, Syrmia, Tolna and Valkó Counties
1427–1431	Peter Cseh de Léva	Sigismund	together with John Maróti (1427–1428) and with Stephen Újlaki (1429–1430); also ispán of Bács, Baranya, Bars, Bodrog, Syrmia, Tolna and Valkó Counties
1429–1430	Stephen Újlaki	Sigismund	son of Ladislaus Újlaki; together with Peter Cseh de Léva (1427–1431); also ispán of Bács, Baranya, Bodrog, Syrmia, Tolna and Valkó Counties
1431–1441	Ladislaus Garai	Sigismund; Albert; Vladislaus I Ladislaus V	first rule; son of Nicholas II Garai; together with Desiderius Garai (1431–1438); also ispán of Bács, Baranya, Bodrog, Fejér, Syrmia, Tolna and Valkó Counties; as a supporter of Elizabeth of Luxembourg, deposed by Vladislaus I in 1441
1431–1438	Desiderius Garai	Sigismund; Albert	second rule; together with Ladislaus Garai (1431–1441); also ispán of Bács, Baranya, Bodrog, Syrmia, Tolna and Valkó Counties
1438–1477	Nicholas of Ilok	Albert; Vladislaus I Ladislaus V Matthias I	first rule; son of Ladislaus of Ilok; together with Ladislaus Garai (1431–1441), with Ladislaus Maróti (1441–1443), with Emeric Hédervári (1442–1445), with Ladislaus Garai (1445–1447), with Stephen Bebek (1447–1448), with John Kórógyi (1447–1456), with Paul Herceg de Szekcső (1456), with Michael Szilágyi (1456–1458) et al.; also ispán of Bács, Baranya, Bodrog, Syrmia, Tolna, Valkó (1438–1458), Fejér (1440–1448), Csanád, Csongrád, Temes (1441–1446) and Somogy Counties (1446–1458); also voivode of Transylvania (1441–1458, 1459–1472) and captain of Belgrade (1441–1458), count of the Székelys (1441–1446), ban of Severin (1445–1446), ban of Slavonia (1457–1466) and king of Bosnia (1472–1477)
1441–1443	Ladislaus Maróti	Vladislaus I Ladislaus V	son of John Maróti; together with Nicholas of Ilok (1438–1458); also ispán of Arad, Békés and Zaránd Counties
1442–1445	Emeric Hédervári	Vladislaus I Ladislaus V	together with Nicholas of Ilok (1438–1458) and with Ladislaus Maróti (1441–1443)
1445–1447	Ladislaus Garai	Ladislaus V	second rule; together with Nicholas of Ilok (1438–1458); appointed palatine
1447–1448	Stephen Bebek	Ladislaus V	together with Nicholas of Ilok (1438–1458) and with John Kórógyi (1447–1456)
1447–1456	John Kórógyi	Ladislaus V	grandson of Stephen Kórógyi; together with Nicholas of Ilok (1438–1458) and with Stephen Bebek (1447–1448); also župan of Požega (1450–1456) and Vrbas (1453–1456) Counties
1456	Paul Herceg de Szekcső	Ladislaus V	together with Nicholas of Ilok (1438–1458)
1456–1458	Michael Szilágyi	Ladislaus V Matthias I	first rule; together with Nicholas of Ilok (1438–1458); also captain of Belgrade (1456–1458); regent in 1458
1458–1459	Nicholas Dombai	Matthias I	
1458–1459	Peter Szokoli	Matthias I	first rule

== See also ==
- Mačva
- Banate of Barancs

== Sources ==
- Bárány, Attila (2020). "The Relations of King Emeric and Andrew II of Hungary with the Balkan States". Stefan the First-Crowned and His Time. Belgrade: Institute of History. pp. 213–249. ISBN 9788677431396.
- Bataković, Dušan T., ed. (2005). Histoire du peuple serbe [History of the Serbian People] (in French). Lausanne: L’Age d’Homme. ISBN 9782825119587.
- Ćirković, Sima (2004). The Serbs. Malden: Blackwell Publishing. ISBN 9781405142915.
- (in Hungarian) Engel, Pál (1996). Magyarország világi archontológiája, 1301–1457, I. ("Secular Archontology of Hungary, 1301–1457, Volume I"). História, MTA Történettudományi Intézete. Budapest. ISBN 963-8312-44-0.
- Engel, Pál (2001). The Realm of St. Stephen: A History of Medieval Hungary, 895-1526. London & New York: I.B.Tauris. ISBN 9781850439776.
- Fine, John Van Antwerp Jr. (1991) [1983]. The Early Medieval Balkans: A Critical Survey from the Sixth to the Late Twelfth Century. Ann Arbor, Michigan: University of Michigan Press. ISBN 0472081497.
- Fine, John Van Antwerp Jr. (1994) [1987]. The Late Medieval Balkans: A Critical Survey from the Late Twelfth Century to the Ottoman Conquest. Ann Arbor, Michigan: University of Michigan Press. ISBN 0472082604.
- Fodor, Pál; Dávid, Géza, eds. (2000). Ottomans, Hungarians, and Habsburgs in Central Europe: The Military Confines in the Era of Ottoman Conquest. Leiden: BRILL. ISBN 9004119078.
- Font, Márta (2020). "Rostislav, Dominus de Macho". Stefan the First-Crowned and His Time. Belgrade: Institute of History. pp. 309–326. ISBN 9788677431396.
- Hardi, Djura (2020). "From Mačva to Tarnovo: On the Roads of the Balkan Politics of Prince Rostislav Mikhailovich" (PDF). Voyages and Travel Accounts in Historiography and Literature. Vol. 1. Budapest: Trivent Publishing. pp. 167–191.
- Isailović, Neven (2016). "Living by the Border: South Slavic Marcher Lords in the Late Medieval Balkans (13th–15th Centuries)" (PDF). Banatica. 26 (2): 105–117.
- Ivanović, Miloš; Isailović, Neven (2015). "The Danube in Serbian-Hungarian Relations in the 14th and 15th Centuries". Tibiscvm: Istorie–Arheologie. 5: 377–393.
- Jireček, Constantin (1911). Geschichte der Serben. Vol. 1. Gotha: Perthes.
- Jireček, Constantin (1918). Geschichte der Serben. Vol. 2. Gotha: Perthes.
- Krstić, Aleksandar R. (2016). "The Rival and the Vassal of Charles Robert of Anjou: King Vladislav II Nemanjić" (PDF). Banatica. 26 (2): 33–51.
- McDaniel, Gordon L. (1984). "On Hungarian-Serbian Relations in the Thirteenth Century: John Angelos and Queen Jelena" (PDF). Ungarn-Jahrbuch. 12 (1982-1983): München, 1984: 43–50.
- (in Hungarian) Markó, László (2006). A magyar állam főméltóságai Szent Istvántól napjainkig – Életrajzi Lexikon ("The High Officers of the Hungarian State from Saint Stephen to the Present Days – A Biographical Encyclopedia") (2nd edition); Helikon Kiadó Kft., Budapest; ISBN 963-547-085-1.
- Moravcsik, Gyula (1970). Byzantium and the Magyars. Budapest: Akadémiai Kiadó.
- Pálosfalvi, Tamás (2018). From Nicopolis to Mohács: A History of Ottoman-Hungarian Warfare, 1389-1526. Leiden: BRILL. ISBN 9789004375659.
- Spremić, Momčilo (2014). "Le Despote Stefan Lazarević et Sieur Djuradj Branković" (PDF). Balcanica. 45: 145–163.
- Ternovácz, Bálint (2017). "A macsói és barancsi területek története 1319-ig [Te Territories of Macsó and Barancs until 1319]". In Fábián, Laura; et al. (eds.). Micae Mediaevales VI (in Hungarian). Eötvös Loránd University. pp. 227–240. ISBN 978-963-284-826-6.
- Vasin, Dejana (2019). "Natural Conditions as a Factor of Urbanization of the Lower Posavina in the Middle Ages". Istraživanja: Journal of Historical Researches. 30 (30): 45–68. doi:10.19090/i.2019.30.45-68.
- (in Hungarian) Zsoldos, Attila (2011). Magyarország világi archontológiája, 1000–1301 ("Secular Archontology of Hungary, 1000–1301"). História, MTA Történettudományi Intézete. Budapest. ISBN 978-963-9627-38-3
