= Péter Perényi =

Hungarian nobleman, fort commander and judge

Péter Perényi de Nagyida
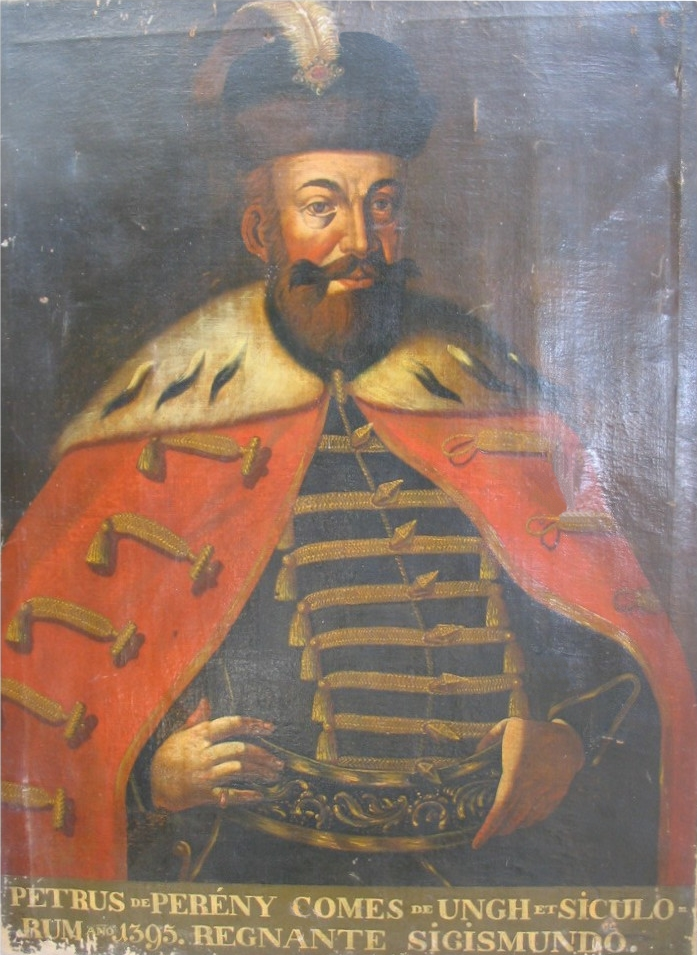
- Picture of Perényi Péter országbíró portréja
- Died: c. 1423
- Title: Count of Temes County
- Spouses: Julianna N.; Anna Széchy de Felsõlendva
- Children: Simon, János, Miklós
- Parent: Simon

Péter Perényi de Nagyida (died around 1423), son of Simon of the Perényi branch of the Šubić clan, was the head (or ispán) of Temes County from the end of the 14th century into the start of the 15th century. He also commanded Golubac fortress in 1391. He served as judge royal between 1415 and 1423.

He married twice, first to Julianna N., with whom he had two sons, Simon and János, and second to Anna Széchy de Felsõlendva (now Grad, Slovenia), who gave him another son, Miklós.

Political offices
Preceded by Simon Rozgonyi	Judge royal 1415–1423	Succeeded by Stephen Kompolti
