= Szalánta =

Szalánta Szalánta Salanta
- Village (Falva)
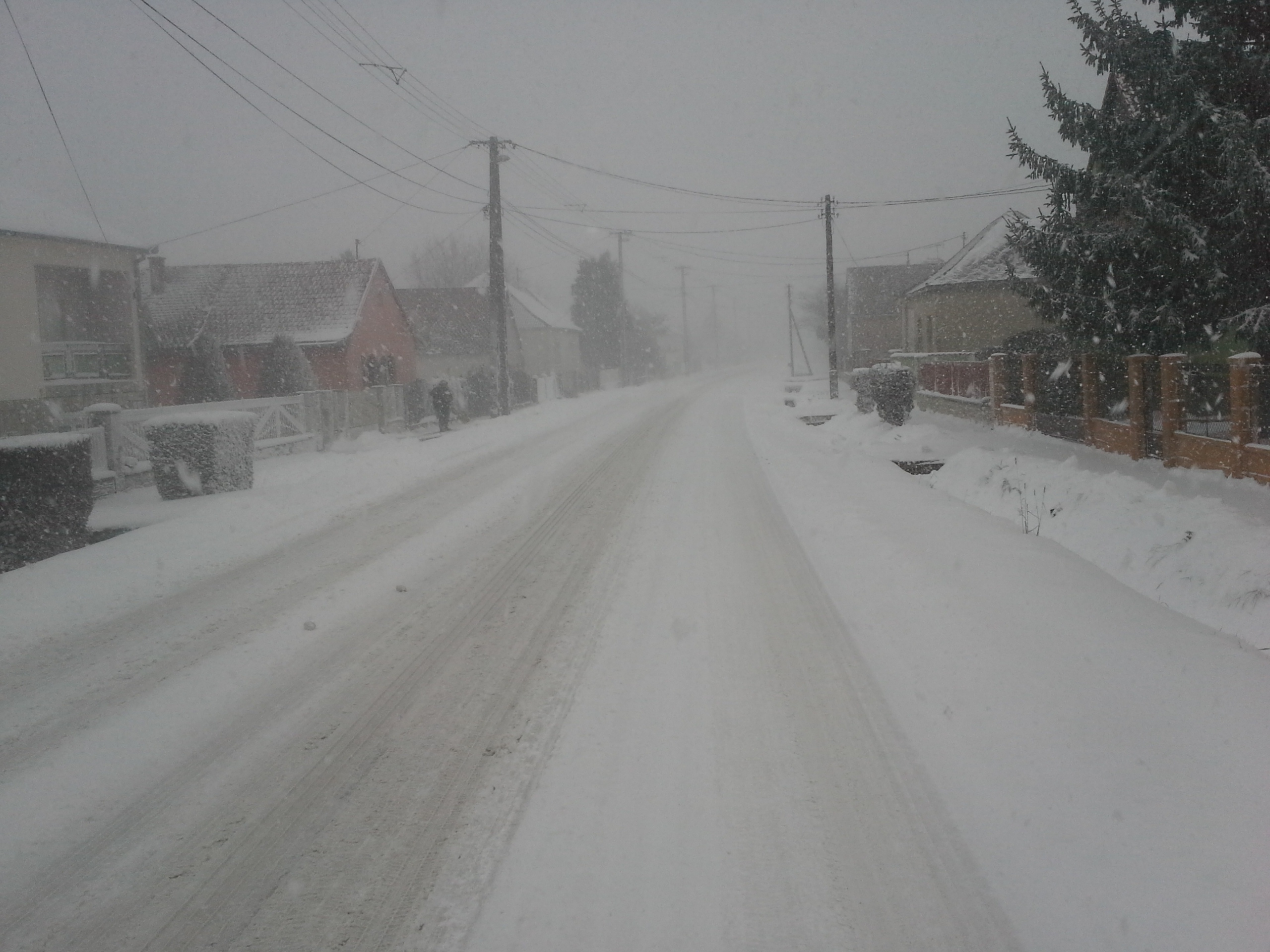
- Hunyadi street

- Flag
- Interactive map of Szalánta
- Coordinates: 45°57′N 18°14′E
- Country: Hungary
- County: Baranya

Area
  - Total: 6.6 sq mi (17 km^{2})

Population (2025)
  - Total: 1,190
- Time zone: UTC+1 (CET)
  - Summer (DST): UTC+2 (CEST)
- Website: https://www.szalanta.hu/

Szalánta is a village in Baranya county, Hungary.
