= Mária Simonyi =

Hungarian actress (1884-1959)

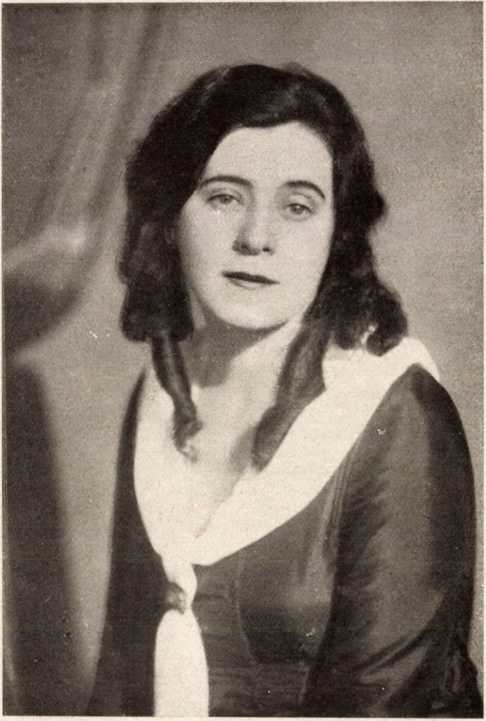
- Born: 5 December 1888; Szénásfalu
- Died: 2 June 1959 (aged 70); Budapest
- Citizenship: Hungarian
- Occupation: Actress
- Spouse: Zsigmond Móricz

Mária Simonyi (5 December 1888 in Szénásfalu – 2 June 1959 in Budapest) was a Hungarian actress, the second wife of Zsigmond Móricz. She mainly played the distinctive heroes of modern colloquial plays with beautiful speech.

== Career ==
She graduated from the University of Theatre and Film Arts in Budapest in 1910, began her career with Feld Irén, then played at the Hungarian Theatre, and in 1912 at the New Theatre. She performed in Košice and Brassó for two years, and in 1916, at the invitation of László Beöthy, she was contracted by the Hungarian Theatre. From 1919 she was a member of the Belvárosi Theatre, and from 1923 by the Renaissance Theatre. Later, she was only contracted for guest performances. She played at the Comedy Theatre of Budapest, the Belvárosi Theatre, the Müpa Budapest and the Hungarian Theatre. she performed in Transylvania between 1930 and 1931. After 1945 she performed at the Belváros Theatre.

Her first husband was the cellist Jenő Kerpely, a teacher at the Franz Liszt Academy of Music, whom she married on 9 July 1919 in Budapest, and they divorced the following year. In 1926 she became the wife of Zsigmond Móricz.

== Important roles ==
- Rédey Eszter (Zsigmond Móricz: Úri muri)
- Katalin (Schnitzler: Az élet szava)
- Vera Nikolnjevna (Urvancov: Vera Mirceva)
- Hattyúvér (Strindberg)
- Sophie (Rolland: A szerelem és halál játéka)
- Helén (Géraldy: Szeretni)
- Anna bárónő (Neumann: Oroszország)
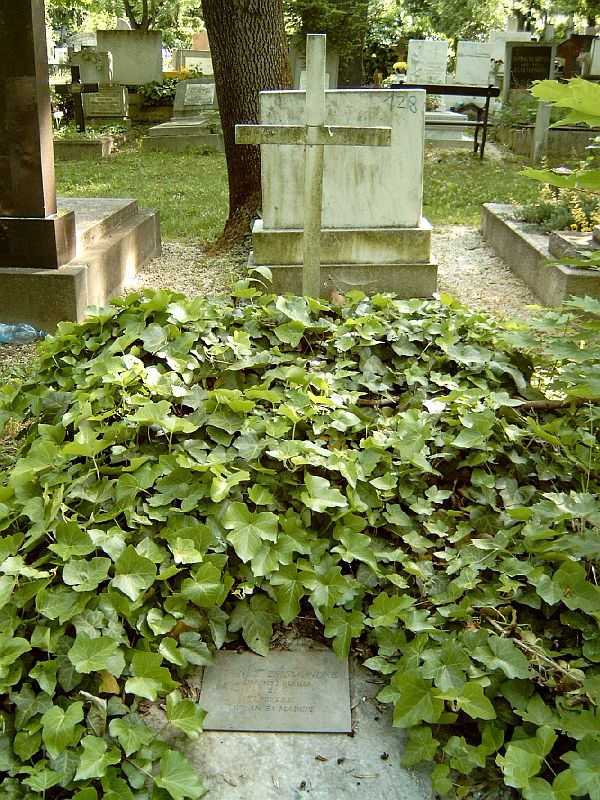
  Her grave: Budapest, Farkasréti Cemetery, 8/2-1-155.
- Higginsné (George Bernard Shaw: Pygmalion)

== Film ==
Be True Until Death (1936) – Countess
