= Liszkói family =

Hungarian noble family (14th century to the 15th century)

House of Liszkói
- Parent house: Genus Szentemágócs
- Country: Kingdom of Hungary
- Founded: c. 1335
- Founder: Paul I
- Final ruler: Stephen III
- Dissolution: 1411/1412

The Liszkói or Liszkai, also known as Bátyai, was a medieval noble family in the Kingdom of Hungary from the mid-14th century to the early 15th century. They were part of the upper elite during the reigns of Louis I and Sigismund. They possessed estates in the medieval Valkó County (present-day roughly Vukovar-Srijem County, Croatia).

== History ==
=== Origin ===
The Liszkói family descended from the Valkó County branch of the gens (clan) Szentemágócs, which, by the 13th century, held possessions in many parts of Hungary. A certain banus Martin, son of Joachim, was ancestor of the Liszkói and Bátyai families. This Martin was among the family members of the Szentemágócs kindred in 1291, who approved to certain members of the clan's Szabolcs–Zemplén branch to regain the patronage over the Cistercian St. Mary monastery in Esztergom in or out of court. While genealogist János Karácsonyi refused the connection between the Szentemágócs clan and the Liszkói family due to the misreading of his name ("Maran"), historians Mór Wertner and Pál Engel identified Martin as progenitor of the family. The seals of Paul (II) (1380) and Nicholas Bátyai (1439) both contain the symbol of the Szentemágócs clan (three flowers held by a bent arm), which confirm the origin of the two families.

The three sons of Martin – Paul (I), Emeric and Nicholas – were first mentioned together as landowners in Valkó County, Slavonia in 1301, shortly after the extinction of the Árpád dynasty. During that time, they were involved in many legal disputes with the Marót branch of the gens Gutkeled concerning estates in the county. The three brothers laid claim to the ownership of Pačetin in 1308. The baronial branch of the Liszkói family descended from Paul (a charter from 1316, which was mentioned during a lawsuit from 1414 confirms this), while Emeric and Nicholas were ancestors of the Bátyai family, who remained among the lesser nobility, and who, however, also occasionally used the prefix "Liszkói". Paul claimed the estate Tovarnik (Tárnok) for himself in 1335, when his neighbor Mortunus Gutkeled (with whom he was in litigation several times) pledged the village for his wife, Clara.

=== Rise and peak ===
Paul (I) had three sons, Michael (I), Benedict and Paul (II). As a neighboring lord, Michael (I) acted as an arbiter in 1343. He is referred with the surname Bátyai or Bágyai ("de Baghy"). The village Bátya laid near present-day Antin, Croatia. He was again mandated as an arbiter in 1348. A charter from 1353 mentions Michael, Benedict and their seven cousins (the sons of Emeric and Nicholas) as the possessors of the villages Vinkovci (Szentillye) and Hegyfalu, which were situated in the vicinity of the lordship of Nuštar (Berzétemonostor). Interestingly, the text does not mention Paul (II), the first member of the family's baronial branch. Benedict, also with the name "Bátyai", compiled his last will and testament in 1385; he bequeathed his wealth to his second wife, who was a scion of the Töttös family. The document omits to mention Stephen (I), who was born from his first marriage. In 1388–1389, he was involved in a legal dispute with his stepmother over the inheritance, after Benedict died. In addition, When Benedict mentions a loan (65 golden florins) he provided to the late Paul (II), he does not state that the latter was his brother. Stephen (I) died without an heir by 1390. At this point, the sons of Paul (II) inherited the lawsuit and the associated rights. The document identifies them as his cousins. The lawsuit was also inherited by Nicholas (I), who was the son of Michael (I), then Nicholas' widow Elizabeth Töttös and their elder son Stephen (III), whose names appear in this context in 1394, 1399 and 1406.

It is conceivable that the political and social rise of Paul (II) was due to the Garai family. He was presumably a confidant of the powerful lord Nicholas I Garai. Paul held various offices in the royal court of Louis I in the period between 1360 and 1382 (Master of the stewards 1360–1381, Master of the doorkeepers 1380–1381, Ban of Macsó 1381–1382). He built a castle called Hermanvára or Hermangrad (lit. "Herman's Castle") along the river Vuka, whose small ruins can be found on the outskirts of Antin. Paul, who lost all influence after King Louis' death, died prior to 1385, when his brother Benedict's last will and testament referred to him as a deceased person. Of his sons, only John, who entered ecclesiastical career, became a member of the elite; he served as Bishop of Bosnia from 1387 to 1408, as an ally of Nicholas II Garai. John secured a benefice for his younger brother, Michael, also a cleric, who is mentioned as the guardian (custos) of the cathedral chapter of Bosnia in 1389–1390. His nephew Bartholomew appears in the same position in 1402. John and his first cousin once removed, Stephen (III) were granted portions in the villages Polgár (Palagar; near Pačetin) and Trpinja (Terpenye) in Valkó County by King Sigismund in 1405. John participated in Sigismund's campaign against the Kingdom of Bosnia in 1407.

=== Extinction ===
Paul's other sons did not achieve great careers, but they entered into marriages with influential families. Andrew and Stephen (II) married noblewomen from the Kurjaković and Bánfi de Alsólendva families, respectively. Andrew built a manor in Liszkó. According to available information, none of Paul's sons had male offspring, and every branch had died out by 1424, thus the Liszkóis' estates were escheated to the Crown. Paul's only known daughter Anne married the influential lords Ladislaus Mikcsfi, then Frank Szécsényi. The Liszkóis' wealth, including the fort of Hermanvára, were granted to a very distant relative John Alsáni by King Sigismund in 1424. The castle became a property of the House of Talovac in 1437, after the Alsánis' extinction. Andrew's daughter Anne married royal knight Ladislaus Jakcs de Kusaly and was a mother-in-law of Franko Talovac. She was also a grandmother of Bartholomew Drágfi and an ancestress of István Dobó.

Beside Paul (II), only his cousin Nicholas (I) had descendants. As mentioned above, Stephen (III) was involved in the lawsuit over the inheritance of Benedict. Stephen and his brother, the cleric Bartholomew complained in 1396 that their serfs were robbed and harassed by Andrew's men. The brothers were familiares of John Kanizsai, Archbishop of Esztergom in 1402. In this capacity, they, in addition to their relative Ladislaus Töttös, were granted the estates Vera, Kwuesd, Tordinci (Tordafalva) and Ebeel in Valkó County by the prelate with the consent of King Sigismund in that year. Since Kanizsai was a leader of the magnates' uprising against the king in the next year, it is possible that Stephen (III) also participated in the rebellion. As mentioned above, Stephen was granted portions together with Bishop John in 1405. In contemporary records, Stephen is also referred to as Ladislaus or with the epithet "the Cuman" (Kury). The last male member of the family was Stephen (III), who died in 1411 or 1412, without male descendants. He was survived by his mother Elizabeth Töttös.

== Possessions ==
Historian Pál Engel determined 43 estates in the Liszkóis' possession throughout the eastern part of Valkó County (now mostly Vukovar-Srijem County), southeast to Osijek, in the period between 1329 and 1424. Following their extinction, all of these became the property of the Alsáni family, and subsequently of the Talovac family.

The main residence was Liszkó, which estate laid near present-day Bobota, Croatia (the uninhabited area and archaelogocial site of Staro Ljeskovo preserved its name). Its lordship contained Liszkó and 10 additional estates; they possessed the nearby Nagybold, Kisbold (Velika Boda and Mala Boda in Vera, Croatia, respectively), Trpinja (Terpenye), Silaš (Szilas), Lapáncs and Leveles. The estate Bátya (Baćina) lay to the southwest of these, on the right bank of the Vuka River (near present-day Antin). The Liszkóis erected their fort called Hermanvára or Hermangrad in this area, which was developed into a significant castle in the region during the 16th century, and whose ruins were still visible as late as the early 18th century. The village Hermanfalva was located here. They also owned Tótfalu and Csabagáta (near Tordinci), which were also accessories of the castle of Hermanvára.

A second manorial center emerged around Vinkovci (Szentillye or Ilinci). The additional estates belonged to this: Leskovac (Leszkovc), Baskfalva, Kunovce (Kunfalva), Novakovci (Újfalu; now Novo Selo, a neighborhood of Vinkovci), Odolenfalva, Draganovce (Draganfalva), Fetenkovci (Fekecsfalva), Miljanovac (Milenfalva), Szlavkfalva and Bogdánfalva (near present-day Ostrovo). Additionally, the estate Zablatja with three villages (including Zalušče), as well as Hegyfalu also belonged to the lordship of Vinkovci. The Liszkóis possessed a group of estates – Fulouch, Damyanowch (Damjánfalva), Bagyanowch and Rokovci (Hropkouch) – beyond the river Bosut too. The unidentified estates of Mathkouch, Grabouch, Petrouch, Iwanowch and Kyksynch also belonged to the lordship of Vinkovci.

In addition, the Liszkóis possessed some estates in the central part of Valkó County; Pavlovac (Pálfalva; near Tovarnik), Trinčil (Trynchyl; near Petrovci) and Svračjinci (Szarkabokra; near Berak), and in the western part, Erdőszád (present-day Drenje, Osijek-Baranja County) and its accessories. In addition to the 1402 and 1405 donations (see above), the Liszkóis were also granted Zonborovci (Nagyzombor; near Banovci) at an unknown time.

== Bátyai branch ==
Compared to their relatives, the members of the Bátyai family (descendants of Emeric and Nicholas) were poorer, yet one or two of them rose into the lower stratum of the elite through service at court. Martin, son of Emeric, entered ecclesiastical career. He was a canon of the cathedral chapter of Pécs and served as archdeacon of Marchia in the Diocese of Pécs from 1334 to 1342. He studied at the University of Bologna in 1337, when his father Emeric and brothers (Nicholas, George and Lawrence) exchanged their land Szarvas (Sarvaš, Croatia) for Kethkuthtenteleke with the Szécsényi family. The validity of this transaction was contested by the Lack de Szántó family, and the lawsuit was still ongoing in the early 15th century between the Lack and the Szécsényi families over the estate Szarvas. Thereafter, Martin functioned as archdeacon of Baranya from 1342 to 1360. The late Emeric's sons (Nicholas, George, Lawrence, Martin and John), together with their distant relative Stephen Alsáni, were mentioned as neighboring lords near Nuštar and Hásságy in 1353. As a familiaris of Dowager Queen Elizabeth, he was a chaplain in the queen's court and was sent as her envoy to the Palais des Papes in Avignon in 1360.

Emeric's youngest son John seized a portion in Szarvas in 1364. As a familiaris of Nicholas I Garai, he served as vice-ispán of Valkó County from 1365 to 1367. He lost a lawsuit against the Pacsintai (Jánki) family concerning the estate Pačetin in 1374. He is last mentioned by his cousin, Benedict Liszkói's last will and testament in 1385, who had previously lent him a sum of two marks. Among the brothers, only Nicholas had known descendants, Ladislaus, who served as vice-ispán of Baranya County as a familiaris of Ladislaus II Losonci, Ban of Croatia in 1391. This Ladislaus inherited the lawsuit concerning Szarvas together with his cousin Andrew in the early 1410s, but he was also in dispute over the Liszkóis' heritage after the latter family became extinct. His brother, Nicholas took part in the War of the South Danube against the Turks in 1427. He fought in Sigismund's Wallachian campaign in that year. Nicholas was a familiaris of Peter Cseh de Léva, under him, he was styled as vice-ban of Macsó in 1428 and as vice-ispán of Valkó County in 1430. As an envoy of Valkó County, he participated in the national diet took place in May 1439.

== Family tree ==
- Martin (fl. 1291)
  - Paul I (fl. 1301–1335) → baronial branch
    - Michael I (fl. 1343–1353)
      - Nicholas I (fl. 1388–1390) ∞ Elizabeth Töttös (fl. 1392–1417)
        - Stephen III ("the Cuman", "Stephen Ladislaus"; fl. 1388–1411; d. before 1412), last male member
        - Bartholomew (fl. 1396–1402)
        - Dorothea (fl. b. 1408)
    - Benedict (fl. 1353–1385; d. before 1388) ∞ (1) unidentified, (2) N Töttös
      - (1) Stephen I (fl. 1388–1389; died 1389/1390)
    - Paul II (fl. 1360–1382; d. before 1385) ∞ N Garai (?)
      - Anne (fl. 1384–1414) ∞ (1) Ladislaus Mikcsfi, (2) Frank Szécsényi
      - John (fl. 1387–1408†)
      - Andrew (fl. 1390–1399) ∞ Catherine Kurjaković (fl. 1393)
        - Anne (fl. 1410–1434) ∞ Ladislaus Jakcs de Kusaly
      - Stephen II (fl. 1390) ∞ Dorothea Bánfi de Alsólendva (fl. 1411)
      - Michael II (fl. 1387–1396; d. before 1398)
      - Nicholas II (fl. 1390–1406)
  - Emeric (fl. 1301–1348; d. before 1353) → Bátyai family
    - Nicholas (fl. 1337–1353)
      - Ladislaus (fl. 1391–1417)
        - Stephen (fl. 1415–1422)
      - Nicholas (fl. 1412–1443)
        - John (fl. 1439)
    - George (fl. 1337–1353)
    - Lawrence (fl. 1337–1353)
    - Martin (fl. 1334–1360)
    - John (fl. 1353–1385)
  - Nicholas (fl. 1301–1330) → Bátyai family
    - Ladislaus (fl. 1353–1374)
    - Stephen (fl. 1353–1363)
      - Andrew (fl. c. 1412–1414)

== Sources ==
- C. Tóth, Norbert; Ternovácz, Bálint (2020). Káptalanok a Drávántúlon. A boszniai, kői és szenternyei székeskáptalanok és a pozsegai társaskáptalan középkori archontológiája [Chapters beyond the Drava. The medieval archontology of the cathedral chapters of Bosnia, Kő, and Szenternye, and the collegiate chapter of Pozsega] (in Hungarian). University of Pécs. ISBN 978-963-429-521-1.
- Engel, Pál (1996). Magyarország világi archontológiája, 1301–1457, I. [Secular Archontology of Hungary, 1301–1457, Volume I] (in Hungarian). História, MTA Történettudományi Intézete. ISBN 963-8312-44-0.
- Engel, Pál (1998). "Egy előkelő család az Anjou- és Zsigmond-korból: a Szentemágocs nembeli Liszkóiak [A Distinguished Family from the Eras of Angevins and Sigismund: the Liszkóis from the Szentemágocs Kindred]". In Csukovits, Enikő (ed.). Tanulmányok Borsa Iván tiszteletére (in Hungarian). National Archives of Hungary. pp. 63–76. ISBN 963-631-091-2.
