= Cărbunari (disambiguation) =

Cărbunari may refer to:

- Cărbunari, a commune in Caraş-Severin County, Romania
- Cărbunari, a village in Grajduri Commune, Iaşi County, Romania
- Cărbunari, a village in Dumbrăviţa Commune, Maramureș County, Romania
- Cărbunari, a village in Poienarii Burchii Commune, Prahova County, Romania
