= John Liszkói =

14th–15th-century Hungarian Catholic bishop

- Bishop of Bosnia
- Installed: 1387
- Term ended: 1408
- Predecessor: George Gordovai
- Successor: Benedict Lack

Personal details
- Died: January/July 1408
- Buried: Đakovo Cathedral
- Denomination: Catholic Church
- Parents: Paul Liszkói; N Garai (?)

John Liszkói (Hungarian: Liszkói János, Croatian: Ivan Mrnjavić; died January/July 1408) was a Hungarian prelate at the turn of the 14th and 15th centuries, who served as Bishop of Bosnia from 1387 until his death.

== Family background ==
John was born into the Liszkói family, which descended from the Hungarian gens (clan) Szentemágócs and possessed landholdings in Valkó County in Slavonia. His father was Paul Liszkói, who was a member of the political elite during the reign of Louis I of Hungary and held numerous positions at the royal court between 1360 and 1382. It is possible that his mother was a scion of the powerful Garai family. He had four brothers and a sister.

The earlier Croatian historiography considered that John originated from the Mrnjavić or Mrnavić family. This name stuck, even though this genealogical error had already been clarified as early as the beginning of the 20th century (Aleksandar Hoffer, then Emerik Gašić and Stjepan Pavičić).

== Bishop of Bosnia ==
Liszkói entered ecclesiastical career, the early stages of which are unknown. There is a claim that he was a member of the Dominican Order, but there is no evidence for this. King Sigismund appointed him Bishop of Bosnia in October 1387, succeeding George Gordovai, who was stripped of his position due to his participation in the Horvats' rebellion against Sigismund. Historian Pál Engel considered that Liszkói was a protege of Nicholas II Garai, who in the same year became the Ban of Macsó. Liszkói is referred to as bishop-elect in February 1388 and May 1388. John secured a benefice for his younger brother, Michael, also a cleric, who is mentioned as the guardian (custos) of the cathedral chapter of Bosnia in 1389–1390. His nephew Bartholomew appears in the same position in 1402.

As the closest relatives, he and his siblings inherited, in 1390, the lawsuit that their cousin, Stephen (I), had initiated against his stepmother (from the Töttös family) regarding the inheritance of his father, Benedict. Two years later, in 1392, the widow of the latter complained that Bishop John and his relatives (including his siblings) had stolen gold liturgical objects and two thousand gold florins from the house of the late Benedict, and had also failed to return six silver spoons and 60 gold florins that had been entrusted to them for safekeeping. The lawsuit between the Liszkói and Töttös families continued into 1394 and 1399. Their estate in Pavlovci were plundered in 1403.

The fragment of Liszkói's tombstone (Đakovo Cathedral)

For his loyalty and service, John Liszkói and his first cousin once removed, Stephen (III) were granted portions in the villages Pologar (near Pačetin) and Trpinja (Terpenye) in Valkó County by King Sigismund in November 1405. The former owner of the estates, John Pologári, was found guilty of the offense of treason (for having participated in the national uprising of 1303) and was beheaded in September 1405. Liszkói participated in Sigismund's campaign against the Kingdom of Bosnia in 1407. The king requested that two hundred foot soldiers from his estates be provided for him, and later mentions that the bishop procured timber for the construction of the fortress of Arky, located on the river Sava.

John Liszkói died sometime between January and July 1408. A fragment of his tombstone (identifying his person with "Ivan de Zela") was uncovered during excavations of the medieval Đakovo Cathedral, indicating that he was buried there. Beside the figure of a bishop in vestments, there is a combined coat of arms featuring, in the upper field, the bust of a lion driving two swords into its own maw, and in the lower field, vertical bars, in addition to the inscription "[MONVMENTA JOH]ANNIS DE ZELA DIVINA [PROVIDENT]IA EPI[SCOPI] ECCL[ES]IE BOZNENSIS". Following his death, sometime around 1413–1415, David Lack de Szántó accused Bishop John of having supported the uprising against Sigismund in 1403, and, citing this, requested that the estates of the Liszkói family be granted to him. The lord presented three letters to the court of Palatine Nicholas Garai, which the rebellious prelates and barons had addressed to Sopron at the time, and claimed that one of the seals on them was Liszkói's. The palatinal court, however, found that the seals could not be identified, while the Liszkóis pointed out that, following the uprising, King Sigismund had bestowed a reward upon John Liszkói in Székesfehérvár. The accusations ultimately proved groundless, and the court dropped the case.

== Sources ==
- C. Tóth, Norbert; Ternovácz, Bálint (2020). Káptalanok a Drávántúlon. A boszniai, kői és szenternyei székeskáptalanok és a pozsegai társaskáptalan középkori archontológiája [Chapters beyond the Drava. The medieval archontology of the cathedral chapters of Bosnia, Kő, and Szenternye, and the collegiate chapter of Pozsega] (in Hungarian). University of Pécs. ISBN 978-963-429-521-1.
- Ćošković, Pejo; Andrić, Stanko (2005). "Ivan". Croatian Biographical Lexicon (in Croatian). Miroslav Krleža Lexicographical Institute.
- Engel, Pál (1996). Magyarország világi archontológiája, 1301–1457, I. [Secular Archontology of Hungary, 1301–1457, Volume I] (in Hungarian). História, MTA Történettudományi Intézete. ISBN 963-8312-44-0.
- Engel, Pál (1998). "Egy előkelő család az Anjou- és Zsigmond-korból: a Szentemágocs nembeli Liszkóiak [A Distinguished Family from the Eras of Angevins and Sigismund: the Liszkóis from the Szentemágocs Kindred]". In Csukovits, Enikő (ed.). Tanulmányok Borsa Iván tiszteletére (in Hungarian). National Archives of Hungary. pp. 63–76. ISBN 963-631-091-2.
- Ternovácz, Bálint (2019). A szerémi és a boszniai latin püspökségek története a középkori Magyar Királyságban [The Medieval History of the Latin Bishoprics of Syrmia and Bosnia in the Medieval Hungarian Kingdom] (PhD thesis). Eötvös Loránd University.

John House of Liszkói Born: ? Died: January/July 1408
Catholic Church titles
| Preceded by George Gordovai | Bishop of Bosnia; 1387–1408 | Succeeded by Benedict Lack |
