= Paul Liszkói =

Hungarian lord

Paul (II) Liszkói

Ban of Macsó
- Reign: 1381–1382
- Predecessor: John Horvat
- Successor: Stephen Kórógyi
- Died: 1382/1385
- Noble family: House of Liszkói
- Spouse: N Garai (?)
- Issue: Anne; John; Andrew; Stephen II; Michael II; Nicholas II
- Father: Paul I Liszkói

Paul (II) Liszkói (Hungarian: Liszkói (II.) Pál; died 1382/1385) was a Hungarian baron and courtier in the second half of the 14th century, who held various positions in the royal court of Louis I of Hungary between 1360 and 1382.

== Ancestry ==
Paul (II) was born into the Liszkói family, which possessed landholdings in Valkó County in Slavonia. The family originated from the ancient Hungarian gens (clan) Szentemágócs, the symbol of which was also preserved by Paul's wax seal from 1380 (three flowers held by a bent arm). His father was Paul (I). He had two brothers, Michael (I) and Benedict.

== Career ==
His early career and the circumstances of his social and political rise are unknown. While his kinship, including his brothers, remained among the lower nobility, Paul Liszkói entered royal service in the court of Louis I. Historian Pál Engel considered that Liszkói was a trusted familiaris or associate of the powerful baron Nicholas Garai, and in this capacity, he rose through the ranks as a sort of deputy. Through his court positions, he represented Garai, who governed the distant province of Macsó between 1359 and 1375, in the royal council.

Liszkói was appointed Master of the stewards in April 1360, a position he held for more than two decades, until 12 May 1381. His deputy was Clement Bellyei, mentioned in this capacity in 1361. Beside his court dignity, Liszkói served as ispán of Sopron and Vas counties from 1371 to 1372, receiving the revenues of those as "office fiefs" (or honors). Liszkói was made Master of the doorkeepers and ispán of Varaždin County in early 1380. Additionally, he also became Marshal of the Court in November or December 1381. From then on, the two offices (Master of the doorkeepers and Marshal of the Court) were always held by a single person until the end of the Middle Ages. Subsequently, Liszkói was appointed Ban of Macsó in late 1381 or early 1382. Beside that, he also administered Bács, Baranya, Bodrog, Syrmia, Tolna and Valkó counties as part of his dignity's honour. He held these offices until the death of Louis I and the coronation of Queen Mary in September 1382, when he was succeeded by Stephen Kórógyi, the queen's confidant.

Sometime during his life, Liszkói built a castle called Hermanvára or Hermangrad (lit. "Herman's Castle") along the river Vuka, whose small ruins can be found on the outskirts of Antin, Croatia. Paul Liszkói, who lost all influence after King Louis' death, died prior to 1385, when his brother Benedict's last will and testament referred to him as a deceased person.

Paul Liszkói had five sons and a daughter from his marriage with an unidentified noblewoman (who possibly originated from the Garai family). Among them, John and Michael (II) entered ecclesiastical career; the former served as Bishop of Bosnia from 1387 to 1408 (his death), while the latter was the guardian (custos) of Bosnia and a canon of the cathedral chapter of Eger in 1389–1390, then archdeacon of Pankota in 1396 (he died before 1398). Michael attended the University of Vienna, where he obtained a BA degree in 1387. His sons, who chose secular paths, did not achieve great careers, but they entered into marriages with influential families. Andrew and Stephen (II) married noblewomen from the Kurjaković and Bánfi de Alsólendva families, respectively. According to available information, none of Paul's sons had male offspring, and every branch had died out by 1424, thus the Liszkóis' estates were escheated to the Crown. Paul's only known daughter Anne married the influential lords Ladislaus Mikcsfi, then Frank Szécsényi. Liszkói's wealth, including the fort of Hermanvára, were granted to a very distant relative John Alsáni by King Sigismund in 1424. The castle became a property of the House of Talovac in 1437, after the Alsánis' extinction.

== Sources ==
- Engel, Pál (1996). Magyarország világi archontológiája, 1301–1457, I. [Secular Archontology of Hungary, 1301–1457, Volume I] (in Hungarian). História, MTA Történettudományi Intézete. ISBN 963-8312-44-0.
- Engel, Pál (1998). "Egy előkelő család az Anjou- és Zsigmond-korból: a Szentemágocs nembeli Liszkóiak [A Distinguished Family from the Eras of Angevins and Sigismund: the Liszkóis from the Szentemágocs Kindred]". In Csukovits, Enikő (ed.). Tanulmányok Borsa Iván tiszteletére (in Hungarian). National Archives of Hungary. pp. 63–76. ISBN 963-631-091-2.
- Haraszti Szabó, Péter (2021). "A magyar káptalanok vezető méltóságainak peregrinációja a Zsigmond-korban [Peregrination of the Leading Dignitaries of Hungarian Cathedral Chapters during the Reign of Sigismund of Luxemburg (1387–1437) ]". Századok (in Hungarian). 155 (2). Magyar Történelmi Társulat: 371–394. ISSN 0039-8098.

Paul (II) House of Liszkói Born: ? Died: 1382/1385
Political offices
Preceded by Leukus Raholcai	Master of the stewards 1360–1381	Succeeded by Sandrin Monoki
Preceded by Stephen Cudar	Master of the doorkeepers 1380–1381	Succeeded by Stephen Kórógyi
Preceded by George Cudar	Marshal of the Court; 1381	Succeeded by Stephen Kórógyi
Preceded by John Horvat	Ban of Macsó; 1381–1382	Succeeded by Stephen Kórógyi
