= Tiszacsécse =

Coordinates: 48°06′N 22°45′E

- Interactive map of Tiszacsécse
- Country: Hungary
- County: Szabolcs-Szatmár-Bereg

Area
  - Total: 4.82 km^{2} (1.86 sq mi)

Population (2015)
  - Total: 245
  - Density: 56.22/km^{2} (145.6/sq mi)
- Time zone: UTC+1 (CET)
  - Summer (DST): UTC+2 (CEST)
- Postal code: 4947
- Area code: 44
- Website: http://www.tiszacsecse.hu/koszonto.html

Location of Szabolcs-Szatmar-Bereg county in Hungary

Tiszacsécse is a village in Szabolcs-Szatmár-Bereg county, in the Northern Great Plain region of eastern Hungary.

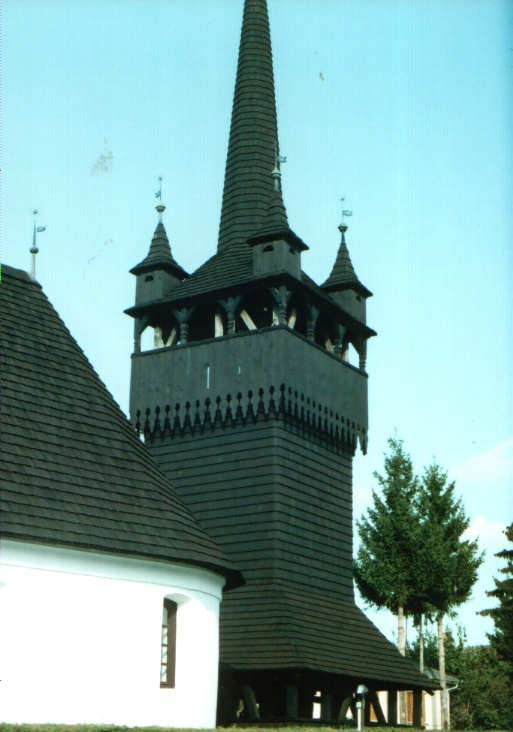
Reformed Church in Tiszacsecse, Hungary

== Geography ==
It covers an area of 4.82 km^{2} (2 sq mi) and has a population of 245 people (2015).

== History ==
The name of the settlement appears in written form in 1181, during the border crossing of the Czégény monastery.

In 1288, the son of Stephen I, II. Mikó - the ancestor of the Kölcsey and Kende families - rewrites the charter of the Czégény monastery, where he is named as a member of the Szentemágócs clan.

In 1315 Csécse (Tiszacsécse) belonged to the Kölcsey family from the Szentemágócs family.

In 1344, after the death of their father, King Charles Robert sued the sons of Matthew, the sons of Matthew, after the death of their father. In his deed dated July 4, 1334, Dénes confirmed the five sons of the Czégény monastery in the court of the monastery of Czégény, and in the possession of Csécse (Tiszacsécse) and ten other villages.

In 1345, the sons of Dénes shared their estates, but the resting place of their ancestors remained: the monastery of Czégény remained common.

In 1484, the Komoróczi family owned Csécse, and in 1496 the Ujhelyi family received a royal donation.

In 1518 the Kölcsey part became the property of István Werbőczy, but was later replaced by István Perényi.

From 1520, the settlement also became the property of Captain András Báthory of Somlyó.

From 1571 it was again the property of the Kölcsey family.

In the 17th century, the village was destroyed by floods, at which time its inhabitants moved to the place of the present village.

At the beginning of the 1800s, the owners of the Kende family, then the families of Count Barkóczy and Count Horváth, acquired ownership here.

== Famous people ==
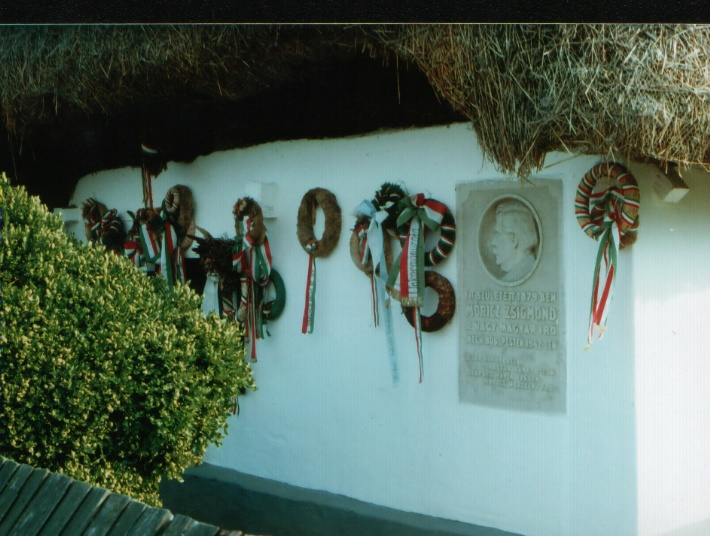
Zsigmond Moricz, birthplace in Tiszacsecse, Hungary

Zsigmond Móricz (author)
