= Móricz Zsigmond Gymnasium =

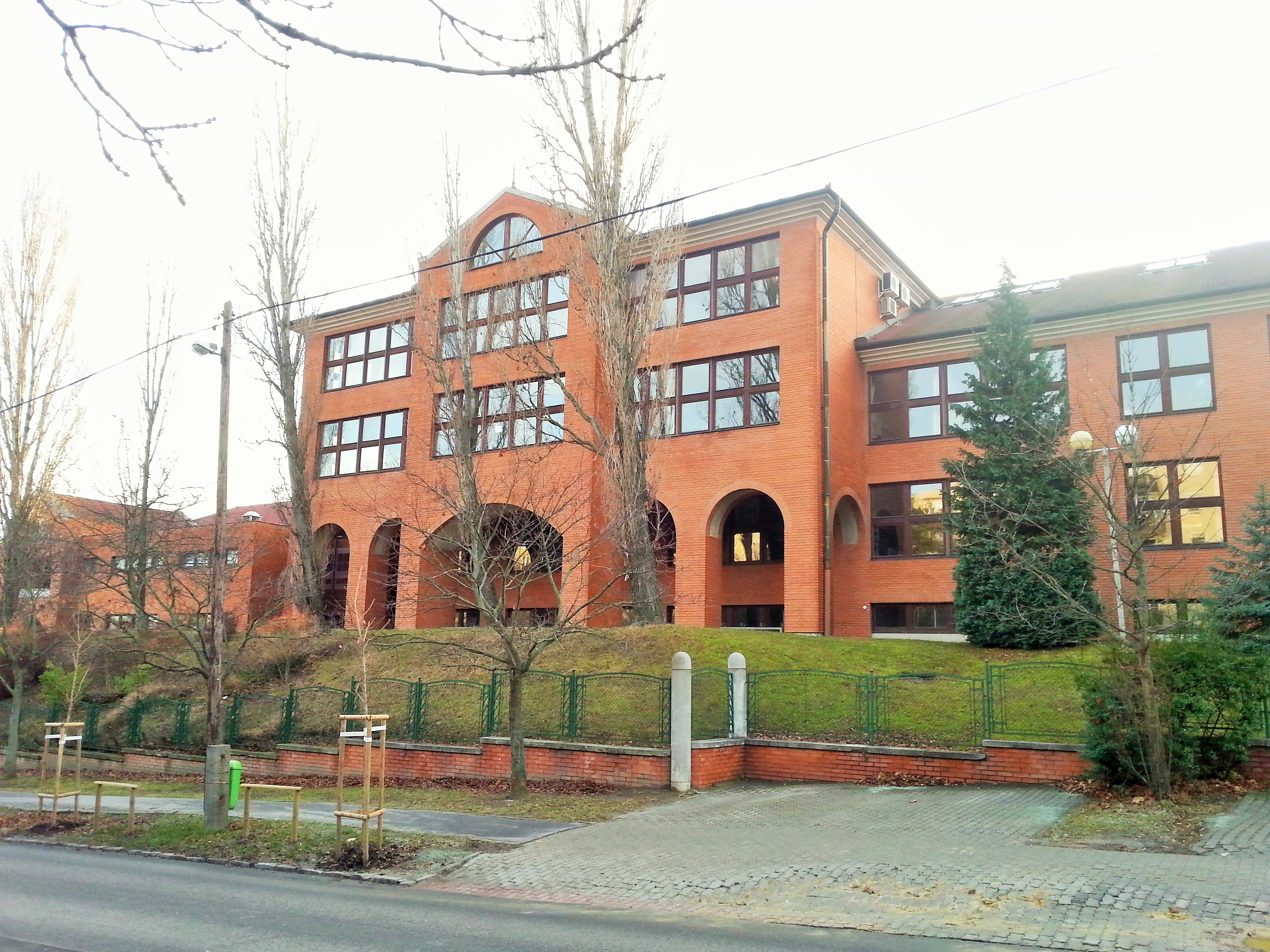
The building

The Móricz Zsigmond Gymnasium (Hungarian: Budapest II. Kerületi Móricz Zsigmond Gimnázium) is a gymnasium senior high school in District II, Budapest, Hungary. It is named after Zsigmond Móricz.

At one time the Budapest Japanese Supplementary School (Budapesti Japan Altalanos Iskola), a supplementary Japanese school, held its classes in the Móricz gymnasium.
