= Thomas Szentemágócs =

13th-century Hungarian Catholic bishop

- Bishop of Bosnia
- Installed: 1289
- Term ended: 1299
- Predecessor: Roland
- Successor: Nicholas

Personal details
- Died: after 1299
- Denomination: Catholic Church
- Parents: Alexius Szentemágócs

Thomas from the kindred Szentemágócs (Hungarian: Szentemágócs nembeli Tamás; died after 1299) was a Hungarian prelate in the late 13th century, who served as Bishop of Bosnia from around 1289 to 1299.

== Episcopal career ==
Thomas was born into the gens (clan) Szentemágócs as the son of Alexius. Ha had a brother Demetrius. Their branch possessed lands along the river Vuka in Valkó County.

Thomas was appointed Bishop of Bosnia by the Holy See sometime between 1279 and 1289. He is first mentioned in this capacity in June 1289. As bishop, Thomas had never had any influence over the Banate of Bosnia, similarly to his predecessors since the 1240s, when the Latin-rite diocese was forced to leave the country from Bogomilism and establish a residence in the Slavonian town of Đakovo.

His name appears most frequently in connection with property disputes. He was a staunch supporter of Andrew III of Hungary. He participated in the royal campaign against the Duchy of Austria in the summer of 1291. In July of that year, Thomas and several family members (for instance, Michael) from various branches of the gens Szentemágócs approved to certain members of the clan's Szabolcs branch to regain the patronage over the Cistercian St. Mary monastery in Esztergom in or out of court, which the clan founded sometime before 1204. Thomas took the estate Balkteleke (a portion in Rücs or Ruch, laid near Đakovo) as a pledge for 30 marks from local nobleman Andrew Ugra sometime in the 1290s. Thomas and Demetrius bought the estate Koprivna prior to November 1293. The neighboring lords, Lawrence and Philip from the Kórógyi family protested against the act. The two sides finally reached an agreement through the mediation of local nobles.

Thomas attended the national diet in July 1298. There, along with the other prelates, he supported and drafted the constitutional reforms aimed at strengthening royal power against the private interests of the barons. He also participated in the national diet convoked to Buda in July 1299. He last appears as bishop in October 1299, when he still resided in the Hungarian capital and was a member of the royal council beside Andrew III. His successor Nicholas is first mentioned as bishop in September 1301.

== Sources ==
- Karácsonyi, János (1900). A magyar nemzetségek a XIV. század közepéig. [The Hungarian genera until the middle of the 14th century] (in Hungarian). Hungarian Academy of Sciences.
- Szentpétery, Imre; Borsa, Iván (1987). Az Árpád-házi királyok okleveleinek kritikai jegyzéke II. kötet 4. füzet, 1290–1301 [A Critical Register of Royal Charters from the House of Árpád, Vol. 2. No. 4.] (in Hungarian). Magyar Országos Levéltár. ISBN 963-05-4199-8.
- Ternovácz, Bálint (2016). "A boszniai latin püspökség története 1344-ig [The History of the Latin Bishopric of Bosnia until 1344]". In Fábián, Laura; et al. (eds.). Micae Mediaevales V (in Hungarian). Eötvös Loránd University. pp. 215–228. ISBN 978-963-284-712-2.
- Zsoldos, Attila (2011). Magyarország világi archontológiája, 1000–1301 [Secular Archontology of Hungary, 1000–1301] (in Hungarian). História, MTA Történettudományi Intézete. ISBN 978-963-9627-38-3.

Thomas Genus Szentemágócs Born: ? Died: after 1299
Catholic Church titles
Preceded by Roland	Bishop of Bosnia; 1289–1299	Succeeded by Nicholas
