= Michael Szentemágócs =

Hungarian nobleman

Palatine of Hungary
- Reign: 1291–1292
- Predecessor: Nicholas Kőszegi
- Successor: Amadeus Aba
- Died: after 1292
- Noble family: gens Szentemágócs
- Father: Albert

Michael from the kindred Szentemágócs (Hungarian: Szentemágócs nembeli Mihály; died after 1292) was a Hungarian nobleman who served as Palatine of Hungary from 1291 to 1292, during the reign of Andrew III of Hungary.

== Career ==
Michael was born into the gens (clan) Szentemágócs, which possessed lands throughout Hungary, for instance in Baranya, Tolna, Szabolcs and Zemplén counties. Michael belonged to the clan's Transdanubian branch. His father was a certain Albert, who had a brother Györk (or Gurk). Michael's cousins were magister Gregory, Apsa, Mágócs, Ladislaus and Inabor. His close relative was Thomas, Bishop of Bosnia. Albert appears in contemporary records in 1264, when – as an influential local lord – he mediated a dispute between the nobles of Gerenás in Tolna County and the Knights Hospitaller.

In November 1291, Michael acted as ad-litem judge in a lawsuit between the Szakadáti family and the sons of Matthew Szentemágócs over the estate Bika in Baranya County. Shortly after, Michael was installed Palatine of Hungary in December 1291, holding the office with Amadeus Aba simultaneously. His appointment took place, when the Kőszegis rebelled against Andrew III following the Austrian–Hungarian War. This was the first known case, when two office-holders bore the title at the same time. While Amadeus Aba dealt with affairs in Tiszántúl, Michael was responsible for affairs in Transdanubia. Michael already served as palatine, when – alongside several other members of the Szentemágócs kindred – approved to certain members of the clan to regain the patronage over the Cistercian St. Mary monastery in Esztergom in or out of court.

According to historian Attila Zsoldos, Michael held the dignity until late 1292, when Andrew III was liberated from the Kőszegis' captivity. Amadeus Aba remained the sole office-holder of the position of palatine for the next year. Historian Tamás Kádár considered the 1291 single document styles Michael as palatine retrospectively, and he possibly held the dignity in the late 1280s (mostly 1288 or 1289), when the politically isolated Ladislaus IV of Hungary appointed officials from the minor nobility.

== Sources ==
- Kádár, Tamás (2022). "Pontosítások, megjegyzések és észrevételek az 1272–1301 között működő nádorok, illetve nádori címet használó előkelők archontológiájához [Clarifications, Comments and Remarks on the Archontology of the Reigning Palatines and Noblemen who used the Title of Palatine in the Period 1272–1301]". Fons. 29 (2). Szentpétery Imre Történettudományi Alapítvány: 155–206. ISSN 1217-8020.
- Karácsonyi, János (1901). A magyar nemzetségek a XIV. század közepéig. III. kötet [The Hungarian genera until the middle of the 14th century, Vol. 3] (in Hungarian). Hungarian Academy of Sciences.
- Markó, László (2006). A magyar állam főméltóságai Szent Istvántól napjainkig: Életrajzi Lexikon [Great Officers of State in Hungary from King Saint Stephen to Our Days: A Biographical Encyclopedia] (in Hungarian). Helikon Kiadó. ISBN 963-208-970-7.
- Zsoldos, Attila (2011). Magyarország világi archontológiája, 1000–1301 [Secular Archontology of Hungary, 1000–1301] (in Hungarian). História, MTA Történettudományi Intézete. ISBN 978-963-9627-38-3.

Michael Genus Szentemágócs Born: ? Died: after 1292
Political offices
Preceded by Nicholas Kőszegi	Palatine of Hungary alongside Amadeus Aba; 1291–1292	Succeeded by Amadeus Aba
