= Zsigmond Móricz =

Hungarian writer (1879–1942)

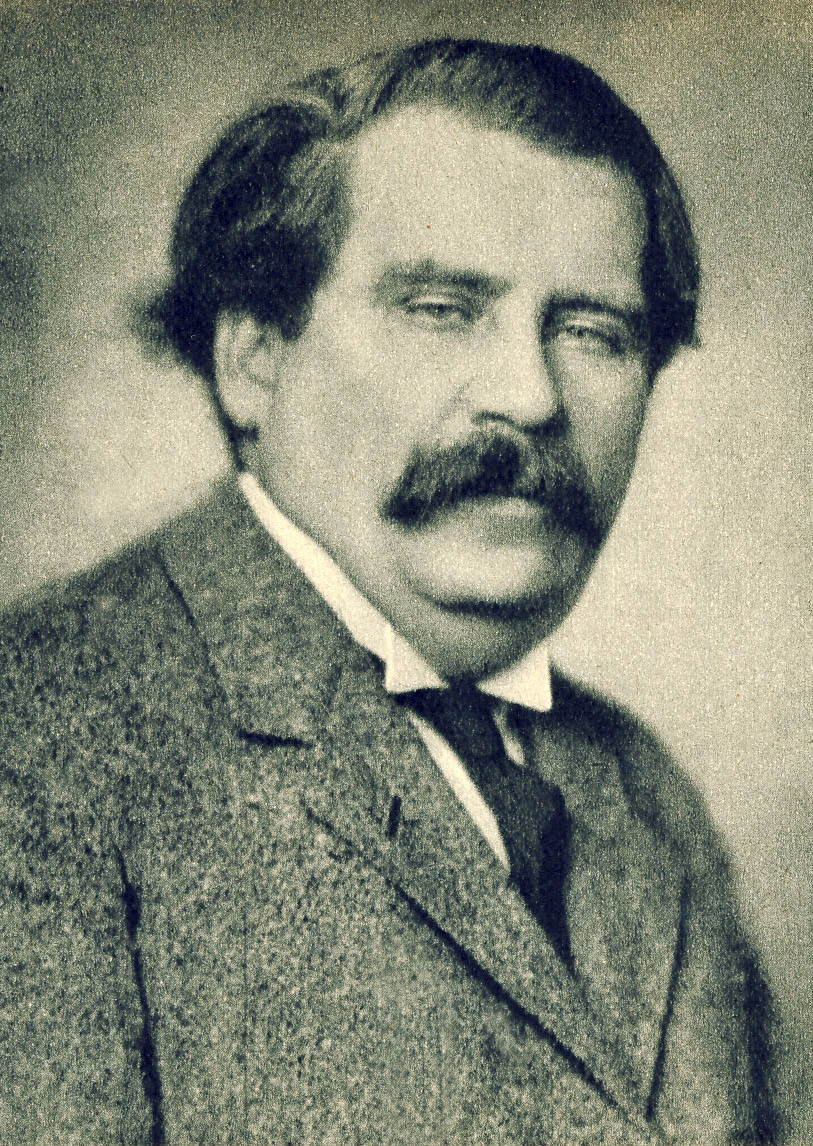
- Móricz in 1935
- Born: 29 June 1879; Tiszacsécse, Kingdom of Hungary, Austria-Hungary
- Died: 4 September 1942 (aged 63); Budapest, Hungary
- Occupation: writer
- Spouses: Eugénia Holics (m. 1905; died 1925) Mária Simonyi (m. 1926)

Signature
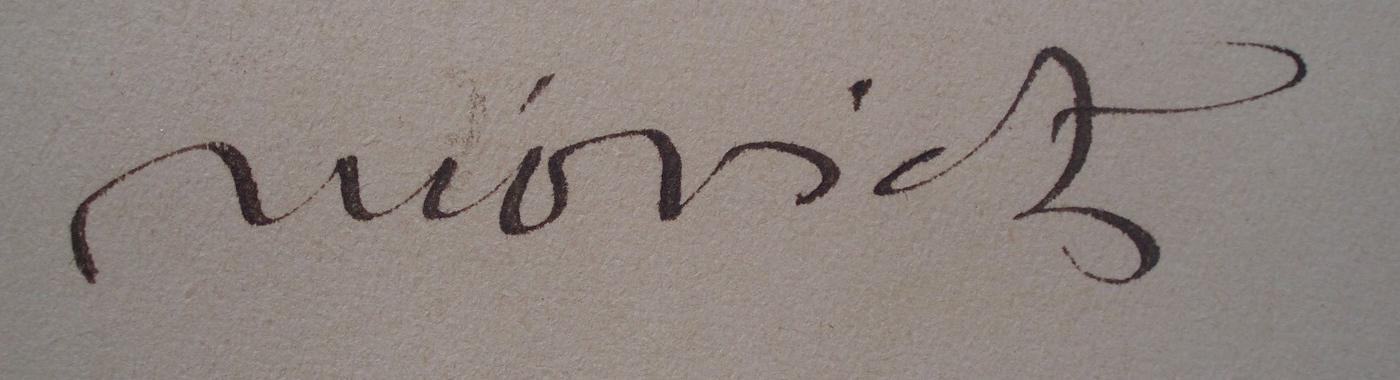

Zsigmond Móricz (Hungarian pronunciation: [ˈʒiɡmond ˈmoːrit͡s]; 29 June 1879, Tiszacsécse – 4 September 1942) was a major Hungarian novelist and Social Realist.

== Biography ==
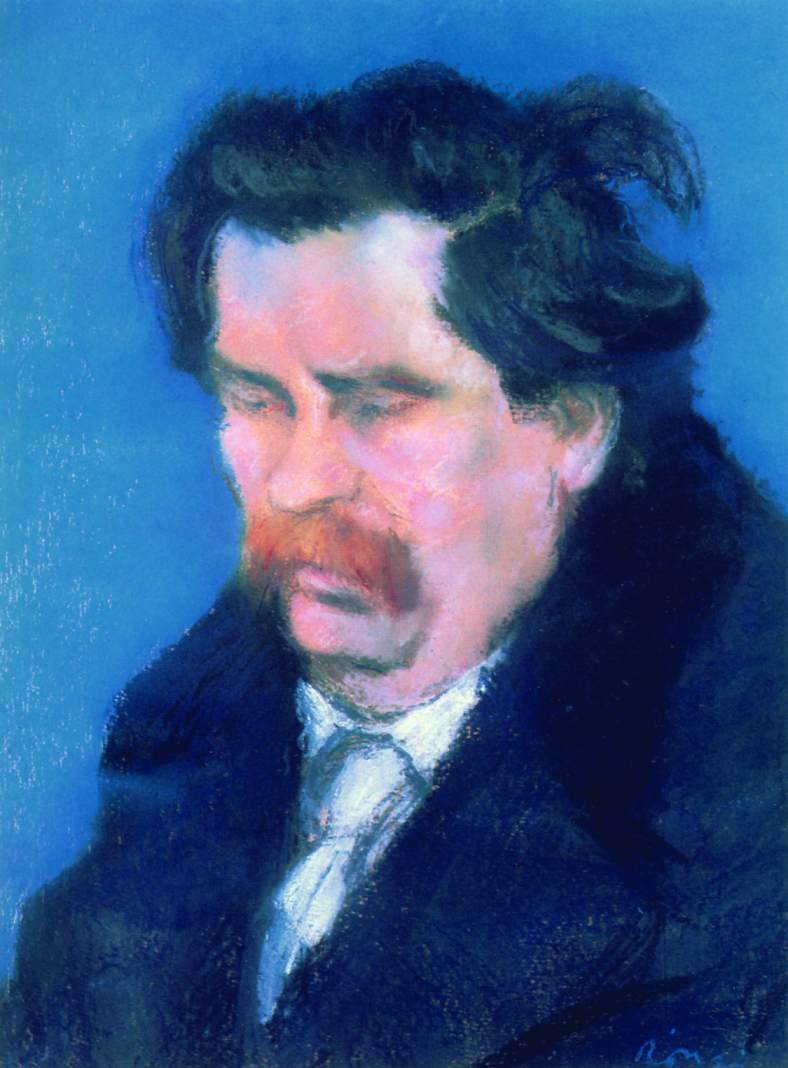
Zsigmond Móricz (1923) painted by József Rippl-Rónai

Zsigmond Móricz was born in Tiszacsécse in 1879 to Bálint Móricz and Erzsébet (née Pallagi). On his mother's side, he came from an impoverished but ancient noble family while his father was the descendant of serfs. He studied at the Debrecen Reformed Theological University (1891–1893), Sárospataki Kollégium (1894–1896), and in Kisújszállás and Szakoly (1896–1898). In 1899, he enrolled at the Debrecen Reformed Theological University to study theology, but transferred into law after only six months.

In 1903, he began to work as a journalist at the newspaper Az Újság, remaining there until 1909.

During the revolutionary government after World War I, he was vice president of the Vörösmarty Academy. After its fall, his plays were not performed in the National Theater, and his work was published only in Nyugat and Az Est. At the end of 1929, he became the prose editor for Nyugat.

In 1905, Moricz married Eugénia Holics. Suffering from depression, she committed suicide in 1925. He married for a second time in 1926 to Mária Simonyi.

His novels express the lives of the Hungarian peasantry and dealt with issues of poverty.

== Works ==
- Kivilágos kivirradtig (Until the Small Hours of Morning) (1924)
- Légy jó mindhalálig (Be Faithful Unto Death) (1920), a classic of Hungarian literature. It is the story from the viewpoint of an 11-year-old boy at a boarding school in Debrecen.
- Úri muri (Very Merry) (1928)
- Rokonok (Relatives) (1932)
- Hét krajcár (Seven Pennies and Other Short Stories) (1907)
- Az ezüstkirály sípja. Iromba J (Silver King's Flute; Broody Jankó)
- Sárarany (Gold in the Mud: A Hungarian Peasant Novel) (1911)
- Az Isten háta mögött (In the Godforsaken Hinterlands: A Tale of Provincial Hungary) (1911)
- Árvácska (Orphalina) (1941)

=== Film adaptations ===
- Be True Until Death (1936)
- Be True Until Death (1960)

== Criticism ==
- The Novels of Zsigmond Móricz in the Context of European Realism: A Thematic Approach (by Virginia L. Lewis) (2023)

== Legacy ==
- Móricz Zsigmond körtér in Budapest is named after him, as is its metro station.
- Móricz Zsigmond Gimnázium in Budapest is named after him.
