= Master of the doorkeepers =

The Master of the doorkeepers (Hungarian: királyi (fő)ajtónállómester, Latin: Janitorum regalium magister, German: Königlicher Oberst-Türhüter) was a high-ranking official in the Kingdom of Hungary from the beginning of the 11th century to 1945. Formerly, the office was known as Ispán of the keepers (Hungarian: csőszök ispánja, Latin: comes preconum).

== Origins and duties ==
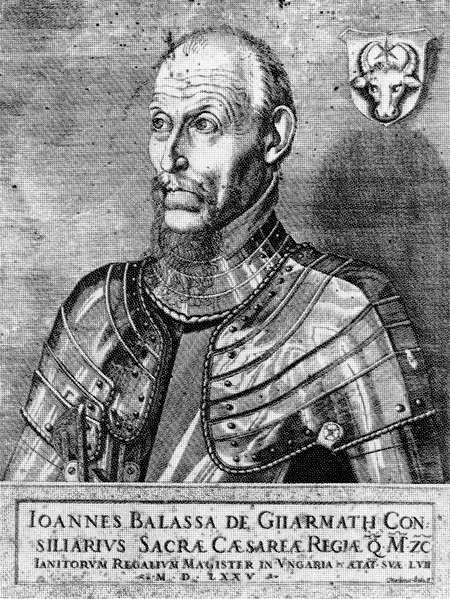
János Balassa, Janitourm regalium magister in 1574-1576

The office-holders supervised the keepers in the royal manors and the court, who were responsible for guarding and had messenger functions. The Master of the doorkeepers cited the subjects of the Crown, with whom the monarch wished to speak, with his ore seal (the "King's citations seal") and using the countrywide messenger network. They also carried 'the bloody sword' across the realm, when the King called to war.

According to the legend of Crown and Sword, the Ispán of the keepers warned Prince Béla to choose the sword instead of the crown before the death bed of his brother Andrew I in 1060. The scene indicates that the Ispán might be also served as Commander of the Royal Guard.

The position was called as "Master of the doorkeepers" first in 1261. He was the magistrate of the royal guards ("doorkeepers") according that source. He had to ensure the safety of the king and the royal family.

The Master of the doorkeepers was one of the lesser barons of the realm, according to the Tripartitum (Article 94) created by István Werbőczy in the 16th century. He was also member of the Royal Council. From the Anjou Age, the actual tasks was conducted by his deputy, usually a familial from the lesser nobility. Later, the office merged with the position of Marshal (Hungarian: udvarmester). After the Battle of Mohács, the office remained and belonged to the Habsburg royal court. Since 1608, the Master of the doorkeepers also oversaw the order of operations the Diet of Hungary. The office-holder was a member of the Upper House until the Hungarian Revolution of 1848 then of the House of Magnates until the Second World War. The office was only a symbolic function after 1848.

== List of known office-holders ==
=== Ispán of the keepers ===
Term	Incumbent	Monarch	Notes	Source
c. 1250	Trisztán	Béla IV	from the gens Hahót	

=== Master of the doorkeepers ===
==== Medieval Hungary ====
Term	Incumbent	Monarch	Notes	Source
1261–1270	Tamás	Béla IV	from the gens Pok	
1301	Domonkos		from the gens Rátót, ancestor of the Pásztói family; Palatine (1314–1320)	
1338–1342	Miklós Sirokay	Charles I	Voivode of Transylvania (1342–1344)	
1343–1353	Töttös Becsei	Louis I	from the gens Becse-Gergely (since 1342)	
1353–1358	Tamás Gönyűi	Louis I	from the gens Csór; Voivode of Transylvania (1350–1351)	
1359–1373	János Gönyűi	Louis I	from the gens Csór	
1374–1377	Mihály Cudar	Louis I		
1378–1379	István Cudar	Louis I	brother of Mihály Cudar	
1380–1381	Pál Liszkai	Louis I	Ban of Macsó (1382)	
1382	István Kórógyi	Louis I	Ban of Macsó (1383–1385)	
1383–1384	Miklós Telegdi	Mary		
1385–1386	Pál Alsáni	Mary		
1387–1392	Leusták Jolsvai	Sigismund	from the gens Rátót; Palatine (1392–1397)	
1392–1395	László Sárói	Sigismund	father of Péter Lévai the Czech	
1397–1402	István Kanizsai	Sigismund		
1403–1409	Simon Szécsényi	Sigismund	Judge royal (1395–1412), Voivode of Transylvania (1401)	
1409–1416	János Tamási	Sigismund	from the gens Héder; Voivode of Transylvania (1403–1409)	
1417–1434	László Tamási	Sigismund	first rule; together with Henrik Tamási (1423–1434); son of János Tamási	
1423–1434	Henrik Tamási	Sigismund	first rule; together with László Tamási (1417–1434); son of János Tamási	
1435–1437	János Marcali	Sigismund	first rule; together with Imre Marcali (1435–1436); Ban of Slavonia (1457)	
1435–1436	Imre Marcali	Sigismund	first rule; together with János Marcali (1435–1436)	
1437–1438	Imre Marcali	Albert	second rule	
1438–1444	Henrik Tamási	Albert; Vladislaus I	second rule; together with László Tamási (1438–1439) and István Berzevici (1438–1443); son of János Tamási	
1438–1439	László Tamási	Albert	second rule; together with Henrik Tamási (1438–1444) and István Berzevici (1438–1443); son of János Tamási	
1438–1443	István Berzevici	Albert; Vladislaus I	together with Henrik Tamási (1438–1444) and László Tamási (1438–1439)	
1444–1446	László Pálóci	Ladislaus V	Judge royal (1446–1470)	
1447–1449	János Marcali	Ladislaus V	second rule; Ban of Slavonia (1457)	
1449–1451	János Kompolti	Ladislaus V		
1452–1453	Szilveszter Tornai	Ladislaus V		
1454–1458	Mihály Országh de Guth	Ladislaus V	together with Pál Bánfi (1456–1458); Palatine (1458–1484)	
1456–1458	Pál Bánfi	Ladislaus V	together with Mihály Országh de Guth (1454–1458)	
1459–1464	Simon Cudar	Matthias I		
1459–1464	Imre Hédervári	Matthias I		
1464–1465	Benedek Turóci	Matthias I	Treasurer (1457–1465)	
1465–1470	János Thúz	Matthias I	together with Frigyes Lamberger (1467–1468); Treasurer (1458–1459), Ban of Bosnia (1466), Ban of Croatia (1466–1468), Ban of Slavonia (1466–1470), Master of the treasury (1478–1481)	
1467–1468	Frigyes Lamberger	Matthias I	together with János Thúz (1465–1470)	
1471–1484	György Parlagi	Matthias I		
1486–1489	Péter Geréb	Matthias I	first rule; Voivode of Transylvania (1478–1479), Judge royal (1495–1500), Palatine and judge of the Cuman people (1500–1503)	
1492–1494	Péter Geréb	Vladislaus II	second rule; together with Miklós Bánfi (1492–1494); Voivode of Transylvania (1478–1479), Judge royal (1495–1500), Palatine and judge of the Cuman people (1500–1503)	
1492–1494	Miklós Bánfi	Vladislaus II	together with Péter Geréb (1492–1494)	
1506–1518	Mózes Buzlai	Vladislaus II; Louis II		
1518–1521	János Pethő de Gerse	Louis II	together with Péter Korlátkői (1519–1526)	
1519–1526	Péter Korlátkői	Louis II	together with János Pethő de Gerse (1518–1521) and András Trepka (1521–1526); killed in the Battle of Mohács	
1521–1526	András Trepka	Louis II	together with Péter Korlátkői (1519–1526); killed in the Battle of Mohács	

==== Habsburg Hungary ====
Term	Incumbent	Monarch	Notes	Source
1526–1536	Imre Országh de Guth	Ferdinand I		
1539–1556	Imre Tarnóczi	Ferdinand I		
1556–1573	László Bánffy	Ferdinand I Maximilian I		
1574–1576	János Balassa	Maximilian I		
1577–1587	Mihály Révay	Rudolf		
1587–1598	Ferenc Révay	Rudolf	son of Palatinal Governor Ferenc Révay	
1599–1615	Miklós Istvánffy	Rudolf; Matthias II	Palatinal Governor (1581–1608)	
1615–1617	László Pethe	Matthias II		
1618–1625	Menyhért Alaghy	Matthias II; Ferdinand II	Judge royal (1625–1631)	
1625–1631	Pál Rákóczi	Ferdinand II	son of Sigismund Rákóczi, Prince of Transylvania; Judge royal (1631–1636)	
1631–1643	István Nyáry	Ferdinand II; Ferdinand III	Captain General of Upper Hungary	
1643–1649	László Csáky	Ferdinand III	Judge royal (1649–1655)	
1649–1650	Gábor Erdődy	Ferdinand III		
1650–1662	Miklós Pálffy	Ferdinand III; Leopold I		
1662–1681	Miklós Draskovich	Leopold I	son of Palatine János Draskovich; Judge royal (1681–1687)	
1681–1690	István Zichy	Leopold I	Master of the treasury (1690–1693)	
1692–1728	Márk Czobor	Leopold I Joseph I Charles III		
1730–1735	György Esterházy	Charles III		
1735–1774	Károly Pálffy	Charles III; Maria Theresa		
1777–1799	Lipót Pálffy	Maria Theresa; Joseph II; Leopold II; Francis		
1799–1806	József Erdődy	Francis	Lord High Steward	
1806–1826	Mihály Nádasdy	Francis		
1827–1830	József Esterházy	Francis		
1830–1834	Antal Amade	Francis		
1835–1837	Nepomuk János Malonyay	Francis; Ferdinand V		
1838–1848	Ferenc Zichy	Ferdinand V		

== See also ==
- Palatine (Kingdom of Hungary)
- Ban of Croatia
- Ban of Slavonia
- Judge royal
- Master of the treasury
- Voivode of Transylvania

== Sources ==
- Engel, Pál (2001). The Realm of St Stephen: A History of Medieval Hungary, 895-1526. I.B. Tauris Publishers. London and New York. ISBN 1-86064-061-3.
- Rady, Martyn (2000). Nobility, Land and Service in Medieval Hungary. Palgrave (in association with School of Slavonic and East European Studies, University College London). New York. ISBN 0-333-80085-0.
- (in Hungarian) Engel, Pál (1996). Magyarország világi archontológiája, 1301–1457, I. ("Secular Archontology of Hungary, 1301–1457, Volume I"). História, MTA Történettudományi Intézete. Budapest. ISBN 963-8312-44-0.
- (in Hungarian) Fallenbüchl, Zoltán (1988). Magyarország főméltóságai ("High Dignitaries in Hungary"). Maecenas Könyvkiadó. Budapest. ISBN 963-02-5536-7.
- Fügedi, Erik (1986). Ispánok, bárók, kiskirályok (in Hungarian). Magvető Könyvkiadó. ISBN 963-14-0582-6.
- Györffy, György (1983). István király és műve (in Hungarian) (2nd ed.). Gondolat. ISBN 963-281-221-2.
- (in Hungarian) Markó, László: A magyar állam főméltóságai Szent Istvántól napjainkig – Életrajzi Lexikon (The High Officers of the Hungarian State from Saint Stephen to the Present Days – A Biographical Encyclopedia) (2nd edition); Helikon Kiadó Kft., 2006, Budapest; ISBN 963-547-085-1.
- (in Hungarian) Zsoldos, Attila (2011). Magyarország világi archontológiája, 1000–1301 ("Secular Archontology of Hungary, 1000–1301"). História, MTA Történettudományi Intézete. Budapest. ISBN 978-963-9627-38-3.
