= Szentemágócs =

Genus (gens) Szentemágócs
- Country: Kingdom of Hungary
- Founded: 12th century
- Founder: Szente and Mágócs
- Dissolution: 14th century
- Cadet branches: a, Tolna–Baranya branch: House of Bodó; House of Céli; House of Móri; b, Valkó branch: House of Alsáni; House of Bátyai; House of Liszkói; c, Szabolcs–Zemplén branch: House of Olaszi; d, Cégény branch: House of Kölcsei; House of Kende; various sub-branches; House of Egregyi; e, Zaránd branch: House of Gacsalkéri

Szentemágócs (or Szente-Mágocs) was the name of a gens (Latin for "clan"; nemzetség in Hungarian) in the Kingdom of Hungary. The clan possessed in various parts of the realm. Several prominent families rose to prominence through their scions, including the Alsáni, Liszkói, Bodó de Györgyi and Kölcsey families.

== History ==
=== First acquisitions ===
The early 13th-century chronicler Anonymus writes in his work, the Gesta Hungarorum, that the common ancestor of the Kölcse (i.e. Szentemágócs) and Kalán clans was Ond, one of the seven chieftains of the Magyars during the conquest of the Carpathian Basin in the late 9th century, through his son Ete. Anonymus writes that Ond was granted lands in the area of Tisza river.

The progenitors of the kindred were brothers Szente (Zenta) and Mágócs (Maguch), who may have lived no later than the early 12th century. The ancient seat of the clan was Mágocs, which lay along the border between Baranya and Tolna counties in Transdanubia. They founded a Benedictine monastery, dedicated to Saint Peter, there at an unknown time. The abbey is first mentioned in 1251, when Elizabeth, the spouse of ispán Apsa bequeathed her estates in Požega County to the Benedictine monks.

By the early 13th century, the genus had spread to many parts of the kingdom, mainly in Békés, Szabolcs, Szatmár, Zemplén, Sáros and Valkó counties. They acquired estates in the western part of Békés County, where the villages Szentetornya (present-day a borough of Orosháza) and Nagymágocs preserve the name of the clan. They also became landowners in Szabolcs County, in the area between the rivers Tisza and Szamos (Someș), where ispán Kölcse received extensive landed estates as a royal grant, namely Kölcse, Tyukod, Istvándi, Kóród, Csécse, Cseke, Milota and Cégény. He erected a Benedictine monastery, dedicated to Virgin Mary, in Cégény sometime between 1140 and 1181. In the latter year, Béla III of Hungary confirmed his donations to the newly founded monastery. The noble families descended from the clan were patrons of the monastery in the upcoming centuries. Prior to 1204, the Szentemágócs kindred founded a Cistercian abbey, dedicated to Virgin Mary, in the borough Szentmáriamező near the royal capital Esztergom.

Some members of the kindred also possessed a forest near Ordas in Fejér County in 1229. This is the first time, when the name of the kindred ("Senta et Maguch") is mentioned. It is possible that the kindred erected the nearby Premonstratensian abbey of Géder, inviting monks from the Prémontré Abbey.

=== The formation of families ===
Members of the clan appear in the second half of the 13th century; however, due to a lack of sources, it is impossible to outline the degrees of kinship between them. Historian János Karácsonyi defined the various branches according to the estates. However, the awareness of clan affiliation still existed in 1291, when several members from various branches approved to certain members of the clan's Szabolcs–Zemplén branch to regain the patronage over the Cistercian St. Mary monastery in Esztergom in or out of court.

Based on the surviving coats-of-arms of the Alsáni, Bodó de Györgyi, Kölcsey and Gacsalkéri (Makrai) noble families, it can be concluded that the ancient symbols of the Szentemágócs kindred were three red roses. These were later supplemented by the noble families; the roses are usually held by an armored right arm or emerge from the ground.

==== Tolna–Baranya branch ====
Matthew, son of Saul bought a half portion of the village Bika in Tolna County for 10 marks around 1270. His sons, Demetrius and Stephen handed over the estate to the Szakadáti family in 1291 following a lost lawsuit which ruled that the plaintiffs had held a right of first refusal at the time regarding the share purchased by Matthew. The two brothers received the purchase price back in 1293. Their permanent residence was in their estate Cél (Chely) laid near Lengyel. It is possible that the Céli family, which possessed portions in Apar, Izmény and Egyházaskozár, descended from them.

Albert appears in contemporary records in 1264, when – as an influential local lord – he mediated a dispute between the nobles of Gerenás in Tolna County and the Knights Hospitaller. His son was Michael, who served as Palatine of Hungary from 1291 to 1292. This political rise was unusual for the era, occurring without any prior indication. Therefore, historian Tamás Kádár considered the 1291 single document styles Michael as palatine retrospectively, and he possibly held the dignity in the late 1280s (mostly 1288 or 1289), when the politically isolated Ladislaus IV of Hungary appointed officials from the minor nobility. Michael was one of the family members, who approved to regain the St. Mary monastery for the clan in 1291. It is possible that his uncle was that comes Györk (Gurk), who paid 20 marks to his widowed daughter-in-law (a daughter of Kompolt from the gens Aba) in respect of her marriage portion and dowry in 1291. However, he still owed his granddaughter her "daughters' quarter" of the inheritance. Györk's sons were also among the family members, who approved to regain the St. Mary monastery in 1291. Among them, Apsa – alongside other members from the kinship – testified in 1292 concerning the losses suffered by the cathedral chapter of Esztergom caused by the sons of Casimir Hont-Pázmány. This implies that Györk's branch also possessed some estates around the archiepiscopal seat.

Family tree

- George
  - Albert (fl. 1264)
    - Michael (fl. 1291)
  - Györk (fl. 1291)
    - Gregory (fl. 1291)
    - Apsa (fl. 1291–1292)
    - Mágócs (fl. 1291)
    - Ladislaus (fl. 1291)
    - Inabor (1291†) ∞ N Aba (fl. 1291)
      - a daughter (fl. 1291)

The coat-of-arms of the Bodó family

Stephen, son of Mark (I), served as cantor of the cathedral chapter of Pécs between 1287 and 1296. He and his brother Mark (II) were also among the family members, who approved to regain the St. Mary monastery in 1291. Mark testified in 1292 concerning the losses suffered by the cathedral chapter of Esztergom. Mark possessed the estate Anya along the river Sárvíz (near present-day Sióagárd) in Tolna County. He acted as an arbiter in a process of determination of borders concerning the Szakadátis' inherited possessions in 1305. His son was Bodó, who is mentioned as a royal bailiff in 1338. He was the ancestor of the Bodó de Györgyi family, which flourished until the mid-16th century. The estate Györgyi once had laid near Mágocs in Tolna County.

Family tree

- Mark I
  - Stephen (fl. 1287–1296)
  - Mark II (fl. 1291–1305)
    - Bodó (fl. 1338)
      - Nicholas → Bodó de Györgyi family

Gregory, son of James, was also among the family members, who approved to regain the St. Mary monastery in 1291. He and his nephew Peter (son of Bencenc) bought the land Kubli in Tolna County around 1300. There, Gregory founded the villages Szalatnak and Bikal. His sons, John and Chama possessed the estate Himesd, southeast to Mágocs (near Köblény), in 1324–1325. The influential lord Nicholas Treutel accused John of theft in 1325. Palatine Philip Drugeth sentenced them to trial by combat. To avoid this, the two parties eventually reached an agreement: Nicholas withdrew the charge, while John sold two of his villages – Szalatnak and Bikal – to the lord below market value (for 30 marks). Chama resided in the village Móri (laid near present-day Alsómocsolád) in 1332. It is plausible that the Móri family, which flourished until the mid-15th century, descended from him.

Additional members – Ladislaus and Gúg (sons of John), Ugrin and Stephen (sons of Stephen), Mikó and Ete (sons of Ete) and George – were also among those, who approved to regain the St. Mary monastery in 1291. Among them, Ladislaus, Ugrin and Stephen – beside Thomas and Kölcse, whose parentage is unknown – also testified in 1292 concerning the losses suffered by the cathedral chapter of Esztergom. Andrew, son of Simon belonged to this branch too; he pledged the fishpond named Hattyas to the Pauline monastery of Keresztúr in Baranya County in 1282 due to his limited financial situation. It is plausible that Andrew was patron of the nearby Benedictine abbey of Bodrog, since the Benedictines filed a lawsuit against the Paulines over the estate in the following decades. The ailing Andrew made his last will and testament in 1320 in the presence of his mother, in which he bequeathed the aforementioned fishpond to the monastery for the spiritual salvation of his parents and himself, in exchange for having his son James and his mother accepted as their patron.

==== Valkó branch ====
The prestigious Alsáni family descended from this branch. The earliest known ancestor is Logretus (I), who lived in the late 13th century. His son was Logretus (II), who is mentioned as a neighboring landowner near the village Tolmán in Valkó County in 1300. He possessed the village Becse. His son was John (I), who participated in King Charles I's unification war against the oligarchs in the 1310s and made his fortune as a leading familiaris of Paul Garai, whose daughter he also married and he succeeded him as Ban of Macsó in 1328. The estates of the Alsáni family centered around the castle Alsán (Alšan), which they built at an unknown time. The family, which provided a cardinal alongside powerful barons of the realm, became extinct in 1437.

Family tree

- Logretus I
  - Logretus II (fl. 1300–1311)
    - John I (fl. 1319–1334; d. before 1335) ∞ Helena Garai (fl. 1357) → Alsáni family
    - Stephen (fl. 1338–1353)

Another kinship also belonged to this branch; they possessed lands around Valkófő along the river Vuka. Alexius had two sons, Thomas and Demetrius (I). Thomas entered ecclesiastical career and served as Bishop of Bosnia at least from 1289 to 1299. He and his cousin Peter were also among the family members, who approved to regain the St. Mary monastery in 1291. Peter testified in 1292 concerning the losses suffered by the cathedral chapter of Esztergom. Thomas and Demetrius bought the estate Koprivna prior to November 1293. The neighboring lords, Lawrence and Philip from the Kórógyi family protested against the act. The two sides finally reached an agreement through the mediation of local nobles. As a staunch supporter of Andrew III, Thomas participated in the 1298 and 1299 national diets. Demetrius was referred to as a neighboring landowner near Tolmán in 1300, as well as the unidentified sons of a certain Dominic from the same branch. During Charles' unification war, the branch (sons of Demetrius and Peter) joined the allegiance of John Kőszegi and fought against the royal troops in the 1310s. They plundered the estates of the Garai family, and looted and burnt the church of Gara (present-day Gorjani, Croatia). Following Charles' victory, they were sentenced to death, but, upon the request of the Garais, the king pardoned them and confiscated only the estates Valkófő and Azariás from them in 1320. The Garais were granted both estates as a compensation thereafter.

Family tree

- N
  - Alexius
    - Thomas (fl. 1289–1299)
    - Demetrius I (fl. 1293–1300)
      - Nicholas (fl. 1320)
      - Demetrius II (fl. 1320)
  - Stephen
    - Peter (fl. 1291–1292)
      - Simon (fl. 1320)

A certain banus Martin, son of Joachim, was ancestor of the Liszkói family, which elevated into the upper nobility in the late 14th century. This Martin was among the family members, who approved to regain the St. Mary monastery in 1291. His three sons – Paul, Emeric and Nicholas – were mentioned as landowners in Valkó County in 1301. The prestigious Liszkói (initially also known as Bátyai) family descended from Paul, while the offspring of Emeric and Nicholas remained members of the lesser nobility.

Family tree

- Joachim
  - Martin (fl. 1291)
    - Paul (fl. 1301–1335) → Liszkói (Bátyai) family
    - Emeric (fl. 1301–1348; d. before 1353) → Bátyai family
    - Nicholas (fl. 1301–1330) → Bátyai family

==== Szabolcs–Zemplén branch ====
The unidentified ancestor was granted the village Szabolcs in Szabolcs County as a royal donation by King Béla IV of Hungary sometime in the mid-13th century. They also possessed estates in Zemplén County from that time. Prior to 1284, Aladar Gutkeled (ancestor of the Várdai family) looted and destroyed Barnas' unidentified estate (during which Barnas himself was likely killed as well). As a result, his sons, Dominic and Belus were involved in a lawsuit against Aladar since that year. Before the convent of Lelesz (present-day Leles, Slovakia), the litigants reached an agreement and Aladar agreed to pay 10 marks as compensation to the brothers around 1288.

In 1291, several members of the branch – Dominic, Belus (sons of Barnas), John (I), Frederick, Peter (I) and Blaise (sons of Andrew), and Michael (son of Endre) –, setting aside their previous differences, secured approval from members of the other branches of the Szentemágócs clan (see above) to reclaim the right of patronage over the Cistercian St. Mary monastery in Esztergom for the kinship. The Szabolcs–Zemplén branch possessed some landholdings around Esztergom, for instance, Péli (present-day a borough of Bajót). In 1291, the all aforementioned members of the branch bought the estates Balsa and Halász along the river Tisza in Szabolcs County for 100 marks.

Belus "the Black" and Frederick (Feldricus) were the most prestigious members of the branch. They entered the service of King Andrew III and participated in numerous royal campaigns both domestically and abroad. For their loyalty and service, Belus, Frederick and their relatives, John (I), Michael, Dominic, Peter (I) and Blaise were granted Vencsellő (an accessory of the royal castle of Szabolcs prior to that) by the Hungarian monarch in January 1293. Belus acted as an arbiter in May 1296. Belus and Frederick served as castellans of the royal castle of Patak (today ruins near Sátoraljaújhely) in 1297. During that time, Belus, Frederick, Dominic, John (I), Peter (I) and Blaise plundered the estates of the neighboring lord Michael Aba, killing one of his servants and injuring and imprisoning others. Before the cathedral chapter of Eger, the Szentemágócs kinship agreed to pay 70 marks in compensation, and, accompanied by sixty nobles, they submitted to eight days of captivity in August 1297, after they had to swear that what they had done was not a premeditated act of malice, but an event born of a sudden opportunity. Belus is next mentioned as castellan of Patak in June 1298. John (I) participated in the general assembly convoked by Palatine Roland Rátót to the neighboring Gáva in Szabolcs County in October 1298. Belus was an arbiter in a lawsuit between the Várdai and Surányi families over the estates Márok and Surány in March 1299. His cousin, Frederick acted as an arbiter in a process of division contract within the Lipóc branch of the gens Aba, commissioned by the king in April 1299. By that time, he served as castellan of the royal castle of Visegrád.

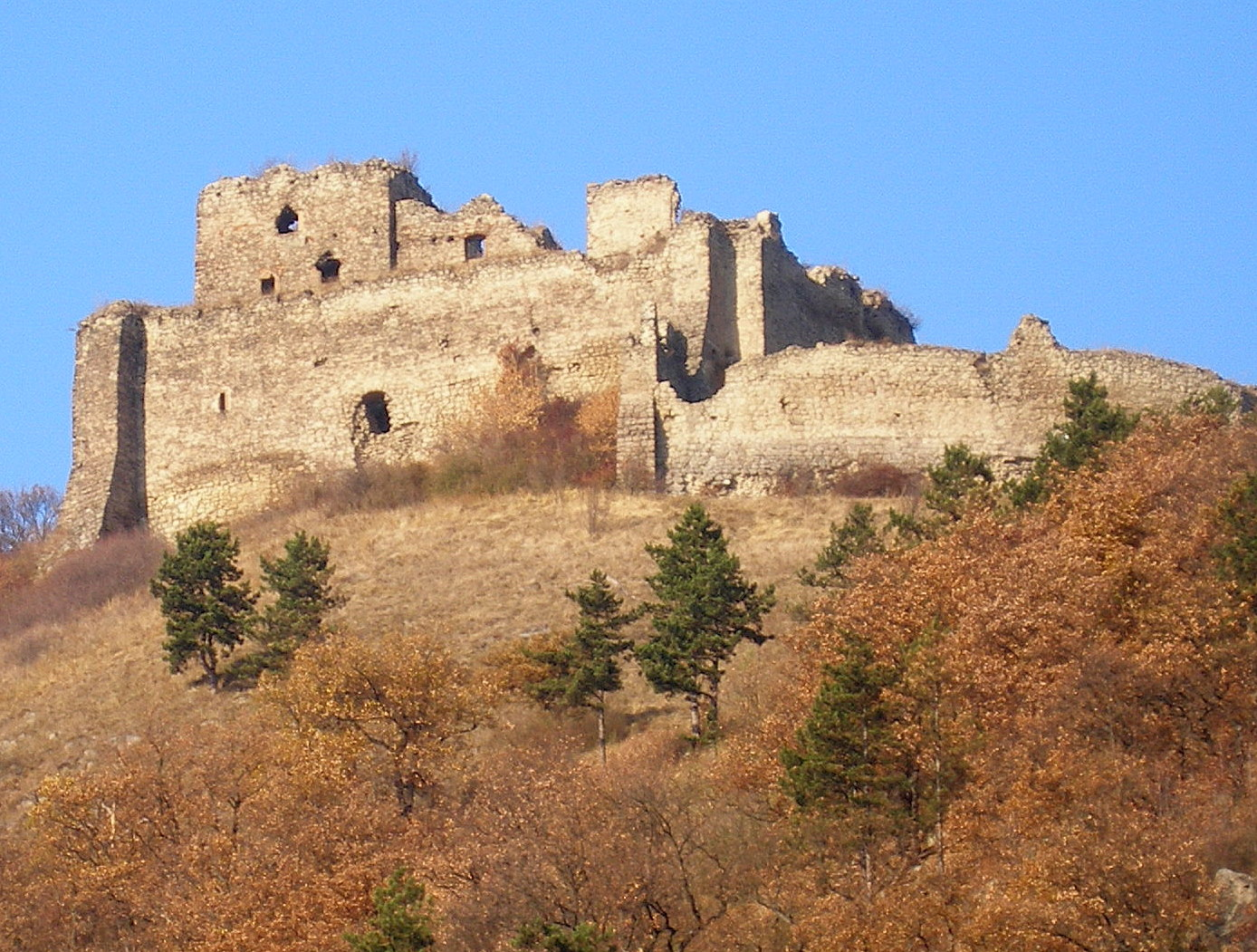
The ruins of the castle of Kapušany (Kapi) in Slovakia, possessed by the Szentemágócs clan for a few years in the 1310s

Following the extinction of the Árpád dynasty in 1301, the branch swore loyalty to Charles of Anjou and plausibly fought in the 1310s' unification war against the oligarchs in Northeast Hungary. Therefore, the king, who ultimately secured the Hungarian throne permanently, donated the estate Kapi with the adjacent ruined castle Maglóc to Blaise (the last surviving brother) and the sons of Frederick sometime after 1315. Prior to 1321, Charles I exchanged Olaszi in Zemplén County (removing it from the royal district of Patak) for this estate with the kinship. During the war, Nicholas Gutkeled (ancestor of the Butkai family) plundered and destroyed their estates Szabolcs, Halász and Balsa. As a compensation, Nicholas handed over a half portion of his estate Bűd (today Tiszabűd, a borough of Tiszavasvári) to Blaise, Beke (son of Frederick) and their kinship in May 1320. Nicholas, citing financial difficulties, sold the other portion to them in 1321, together with its Benedictine monastery. Additionally, his brother Vid (ancestor of the Ráskai family) handed over the estate Györkkerekei (laid near Téglás) to Blaise, and his nephews, Beke and John (II) (sons of Frederick) as a compensation in April 1321. Blaise bequeathed a one-quarter portion of the estate and the monastery to his son-in-law Ladislaus Kállói in 1322. John (II) sold his portion in Péli to the Nagymartoni family in 1325. By that time, he lived in Olaszi and the family soon adopted the Olaszi (and, simultaneously, Szabolcsi) surname.

Blaise acted as an arbiter in the lawsuit between the Butkai and Szakolyi families (both were from the Gutkeled kindred) in 1329. He last appears as a witness in a lawsuit in 1333. The kinship – Beke, Ladislaus (I) and John (II) – was embroiled into conflict with the neighboring gens Tolcsva over the western boundaries of their estate Olaszi in 1336. The royal judges dispatched to the site then determined the boundaries of Tolcsva and Olaszi. Endre's branch lived in Kisfalud. In 1337, Desiderius' minor son, Peter (II) handed over his horses to John (II) until he reaches adulthood. The Olaszi family was also in border conflict with Sárospatak in late 1347; upon the instruction of King Louis I of Hungary, the cathedral chapter of Eger declared that the Dornó River has always marked the boundary between Sárospatak and Olaszi, thereby ruling in favor of the Olaszi family.

Family tree

- N
  - Barnas (Barlas)
    - Dominic (fl. 1284–1297)
      - Catherine ∞ John Kállói
    - Belus ("the Black"; fl. 1284–1299)
      - Nicholas (fl. 1326–1342)
        - Stephen (fl. 1350–1357)
      - Ladislaus II (fl. 1326)
  - Andrew
    - John I (fl. 1291–1298)
    - Frederick (Feldre; fl. 1291–1299)
      - Beke (fl. 1320–1336) → Olaszi family
      - John II (fl. 1321–1345)
        - John III (fl. 1350–1352)
      - Ladislaus I (fl. 1325–1355) → Szabolcsi family
      - Catherine ∞ Bana N
    - Peter I (fl. 1291–1297)
    - Blaise (fl. 1291–1333)
      - Paul (fl. 1339–1378†)
      - a daughter (fl. 1322) ∞ Ladislaus Kállói
  - Endre
    - Michael (fl. 1291–1293)
      - Desiderius
        - Peter II (fl. 1337–1355)

==== Cégény branch ====
The progenitor of this branch was ispán Kölcse (Kulchey), who lived in the second half of the 12th century. He appeared among the testimonies in a royal charter of King Géza II of Hungary issued sometime between 1142 and 1146. As mentioned above, he established the Cégény Abbey along the river Szamos prior to 1181. In the latter year, Palatine Farkas Gatal judged over some serfs, who escaped from the monastery to neighboring lords. After his verdict, Béla III returned the fleeing serfs to the abbey and at the same time he recorded its estates, which can thus be considered the monastery's founding charter. Kölcse's descendants were patrons of Cégény Abbey in the upcoming centuries. The eponymous seat Kölcse became the centre of the branch's domains in the region.

Coats-of-arms of the Kölcsey and Kende families

Nicholas, the son of Ete (I) sold his estate Pertalteleke in Tolna County to Alexander Karászi in 1274. Since his brothers – Ete (II) and Mikó (I) – challenged the sale, he was forced to take back the estate and give Vajk and Malonta to Karászi in its place. Mikó (I) acted as an arbiter at Cégény Abbey in the conflict between the Várdai and Lázári families (from the genera Gutkeled and Káta, respectively) in 1284. In the same year, he also functioned as an arbiter, along with Bishop Bartholomew of Várad and others, when the gens Káta divided their estates among themselves. Ete (II) and Mikó (I) were also among the family members, who approved to regain the St. Mary monastery in 1291. Ete (II) possessed portions in Tyukod in Szatmár County, therefore the village was called Etetyukodja ("Ete's Tyukod") subsequently. Mikó (I) exchanged his land Kadarcs for the estates Szekeres and Zsarolyán in Szatmár County with the Császári family (possibly from the gens Kaplon). Since he and his brothers had no descendants, these estates were inherited by their closest relative, Denis sometime before 1308.

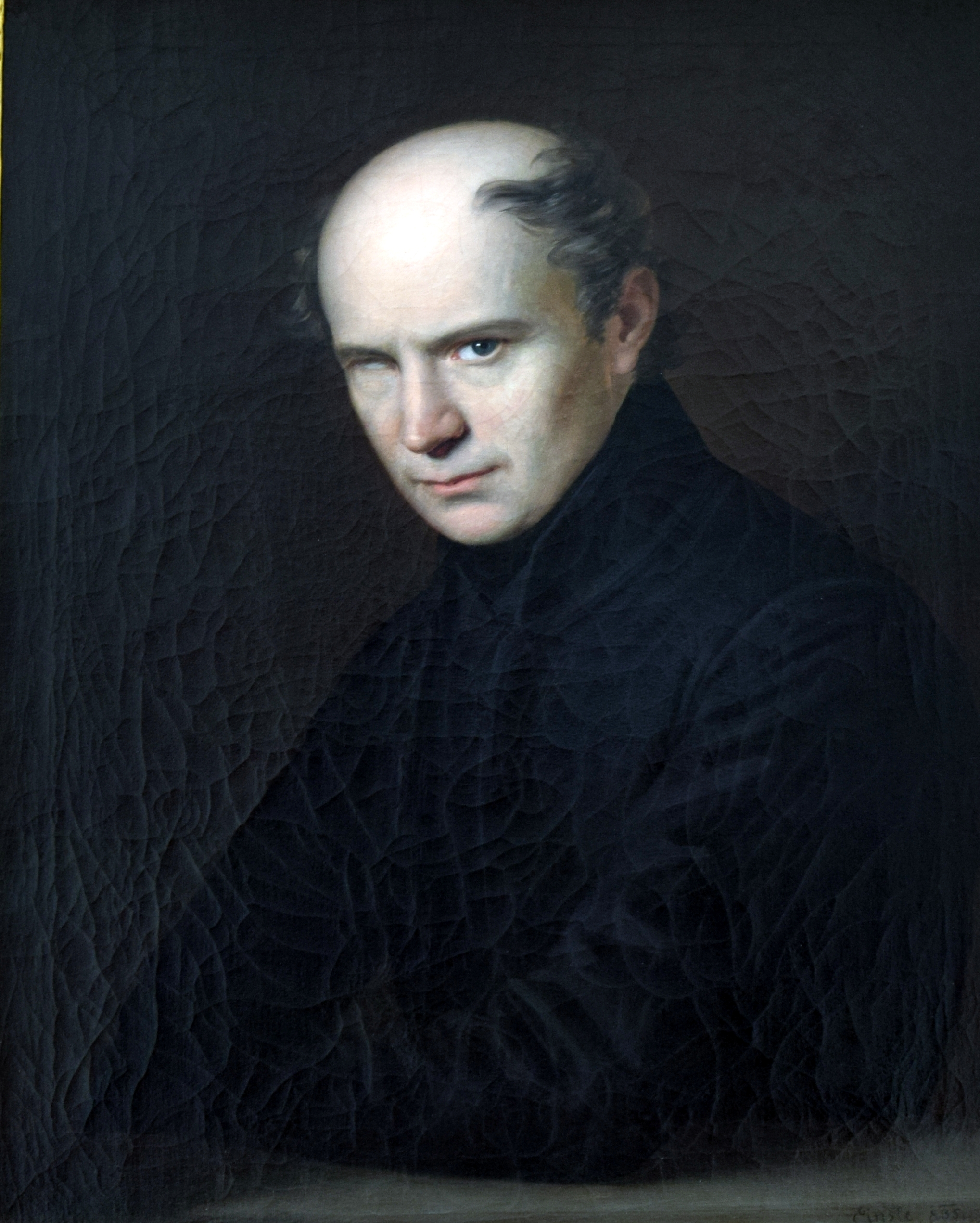
Portrait of poet Ferenc Kölcsey, the Szentemágócs' late scion, who was the most notable member of the Kölcsey family

In 1288, Mikó (II), son of Stephen, whose degree of kinship relative to the other family members is unknown, requested the chapter of Várad to confirm and transcribe the 1181 founding charter of the Cégény Abbey.

Denis, also on behalf of his father and brothers, was one of the family members, who approved to regain the St. Mary monastery for the clan in 1291. He testified in 1292 concerning the losses suffered by the cathedral chapter of Esztergom, but he did this separately from the other members of the kindred. Although he inherited the estates Szekeres and Zsarolyán from his relative Mikó (I), he lost both of them in a lawsuit in 1308, because it was ruled that certain members of the Császári family had unlawfully alienated the estates at the time. Denis had five sons: John, James, Andrew, Michael and Nicholas. Following Denis' death, his estates and right of patronage over Cégény Abbey were wrongfully escheated to the Crown. The brothers were engaged in litigation with the royal court for decades during the reigns of Charles I and Louis I. For their loyalty and on the grounds of the legitimacy of their claim, Louis I returned the estates – Kölcse, Istvándi, Szekeres, Kóród, Cseke, Csécse, Milota, Etetyukoda, Kömörő, Ökörítő and Mácsa (present-day a borough of Ököritófülpös) –, together with the bridge toll at Kölcse, the port customs in Kóród and the right of patronage over Cégény Abbey to the five brothers in July 1344.

The brothers entered royal service during the reign of Louis I, which enabled their social advancement. They participated in the royal campaign against Bogdan, Voivode of Maramureș in 1343. They divided the recovered estates among themselves in 1345; John, James and Andrew were granted Kölcse, Cseke, Petlend, Orbánd, Ökörítő, Mácsa, Etetyúkoda and Szekeres, while Michael and Nicholas received Csécse, Istvándi, Kóród, Kömörő and Milota. The Cégény Abbey, as a common monastery and burial place, remained in joint ownership. John and James served as ispán of Veszprém County around from 1353 to 1358, while the most distinguished brother, Andrew administered Békés County from 1349 to 1356, commanded various royal castles and finally served as ispán of Szatmár County between 1373 and 1375. The Kölcsei (or Kölcsey) family with its various branches (including the Kende family) descended from the brothers. Andrew's offspring were called Egregyi, but became extinct in 1406.

Family tree

- Matthew (fl. 1291)
  - Denis (fl. 1291–1308) → Kölcsei (Kölcsey), Kende de Kölcse, Farkas de Kölcse, Bornemissza de Kölcse families
    - John (fl. 1328–1374)
    - James (fl. 1328–1374)
    - Andrew (fl. 1328–1375) → Egregyi family
    - Michael (fl. 1328–1364)
    - Nicholas (fl. 1328–1374)
  - sons (fl. 1291)

==== Zaránd branch ====
There was also a minor branch which possessed Gacsalkér (today Chier, Romania), laid at the foot of Makra Mountains in Zaránd County, Transylvania (present-day Munții Zarandului). In 1384, it was complained before the Arad Chapter that Blaise and his three sons, litteratus Sebastian, Stephen and Benedict seized the mills along the river Fehér-Körös (Crișul Alb), which once were built by archdeacon Sixtus. The three brothers entered court service during the early reign of Sigismund; Sebastian served as ispán of the chamber of salt (Hungarian: sókamaraispán, mentioned in this capacity in 1397 and 1403, and Stephen was the vice-ispán of Baranya County under Nicholas Garai from 1388 to 1389. The youngest brother, Benedict Makrai attended four foreign universities and was a skilled diplomat. Both Benedict and his nephew Ladislaus, the archdeacon of Küküllő, died sometime before 1427. They possessed the estates Csúcs, Ácsva, Lázur, Magulicsa and Gorzófalva in Zaránd County, which then were escheated to the Crown. King Sigismund donated the estates to the Losonci family in 1427.

The other scions of the Gacsalkéri (or simply Gacsal) family (a certain George and his relatives) still possessed Gacsalkér and the surrounding Kígyós in the mid-15th century. They possibly also possessed the villages Sántosháza, Septely and Eperjes. The family became extinct by the mid-16th century.

Family tree

- Blaise (fl. 1384)
  - Sebastian (fl. 1384–1403)
    - Ladislaus (d. before 1427)
  - Stephen (fl. 1376–1389)
  - Benedict Makrai (fl. 1384–1421; d. before 1427)

== Sources ==
=== Primary sources ===
- Anonymus, Notary of King Béla: The Deeds of the Hungarians (Edited, Translated and Annotated by Martyn Rady and László Veszprémy) (2010). In: Rady, Martyn; Veszprémy, László; Bak, János M. (2010); Anonymus and Master Roger; CEU Press; ISBN 978-963-9776-95-1.

=== Secondary sources ===
- Almási, Tibor (1994). "Szente-Mágocs nem [Genus Szente-Mágocs]". In Kristó, Gyula; Engel, Pál; Makk, Ferenc (eds.). Korai magyar történeti lexikon (9-14. század) [Encyclopedia of the Early Hungarian History (9th-14th centuries)] (in Hungarian). Akadémiai Kiadó. p. 631. ISBN 963-05-6722-9.
- Engel, Pál; Lővei, Pál (1983). "Székesfehérvári kőfaragványok Györgyi Bodó Miklós prépost címerével [Stone Carvings from Székesfehérvár bearing the Coat of Arms of Provost Miklós Bodó de Györgyi]". Művészettörténeti Értesítő. 32 (1): 1–7. ISSN 0027-5247.
- Engel, Pál (1996). Magyarország világi archontológiája, 1301–1457, I. [Secular Archontology of Hungary, 1301–1457, Volume I] (in Hungarian). História, MTA Történettudományi Intézete. ISBN 963-8312-44-0.
- Engel, Pál (1998). "Egy előkelő család az Anjou- és Zsigmond-korból: a Szentemágocs nembeli Liszkóiak [A Distinguished Family from the Eras of Angevins and Sigismund: the Liszkóis from the Szentemágocs Kindred]". In Csukovits, Enikő (ed.). Tanulmányok Borsa Iván tiszteletére (in Hungarian). National Archives of Hungary. pp. 63–76. ISBN 963-631-091-2.
- F. Romhányi, Beatrix (2000). Kolostorok és társaskáptalanok a középkori Magyarországon: Katalógus [Monasteries and Collegiate Chapters in Medieval Hungary: A Catalogue] (in Hungarian). Pytheas. ISBN 963-7483-07-1.
- Kádár, Tamás (2022). "Pontosítások, megjegyzések és észrevételek az 1272–1301 között működő nádorok, illetve nádori címet használó előkelők archontológiájához [Clarifications, Comments and Remarks on the Archontology of the Reigning Palatines and Noblemen who used the Title of Palatine in the Period 1272–1301]". Fons. 29 (2). Szentpétery Imre Történettudományi Alapítvány: 155–206. ISSN 1217-8020.
- Karácsonyi, János (1900). A magyar nemzetségek a XIV. század közepéig. [The Hungarian genera until the middle of the 14th century] (in Hungarian). Hungarian Academy of Sciences.
- Karácsonyi, János (1905). "Makrai Benedek szülőhelye és családja [The Birthplace and Family of Benedict Makrai]". Századok (in Hungarian). 39 (1). Magyar Történelmi Társulat: 40–44. ISSN 0039-8098.
- Szűcs, Jenő (1993). "Sárospatak kezdetei és a pataki erdőuradalom [The Beginnings of Sárospatak and the Royal Forest of Patak]". Történelmi Szemle (in Hungarian). 35 (1–2). Hungarian Academy of Sciences: 1–57. ISSN 0040-9634.
- Tímár, György (2001). "Mágocs története a Rákóczi szabadságharcig [The History of Mágocs until Rákóczi's War of Independence]". In Füzes, Miklós (ed.). Mágocs 1251–2001 (in Hungarian). Municipality of Mágocs. pp. 49–76. ISBN 963-00-6948-2.
- Zsoldos, Attila (2011). Magyarország világi archontológiája, 1000–1301 [Secular Archontology of Hungary, 1000–1301] (in Hungarian). História, MTA Történettudományi Intézete. ISBN 978-963-9627-38-3.
