= Kapušany =

Village and municipality in Slovakia

- Municipality
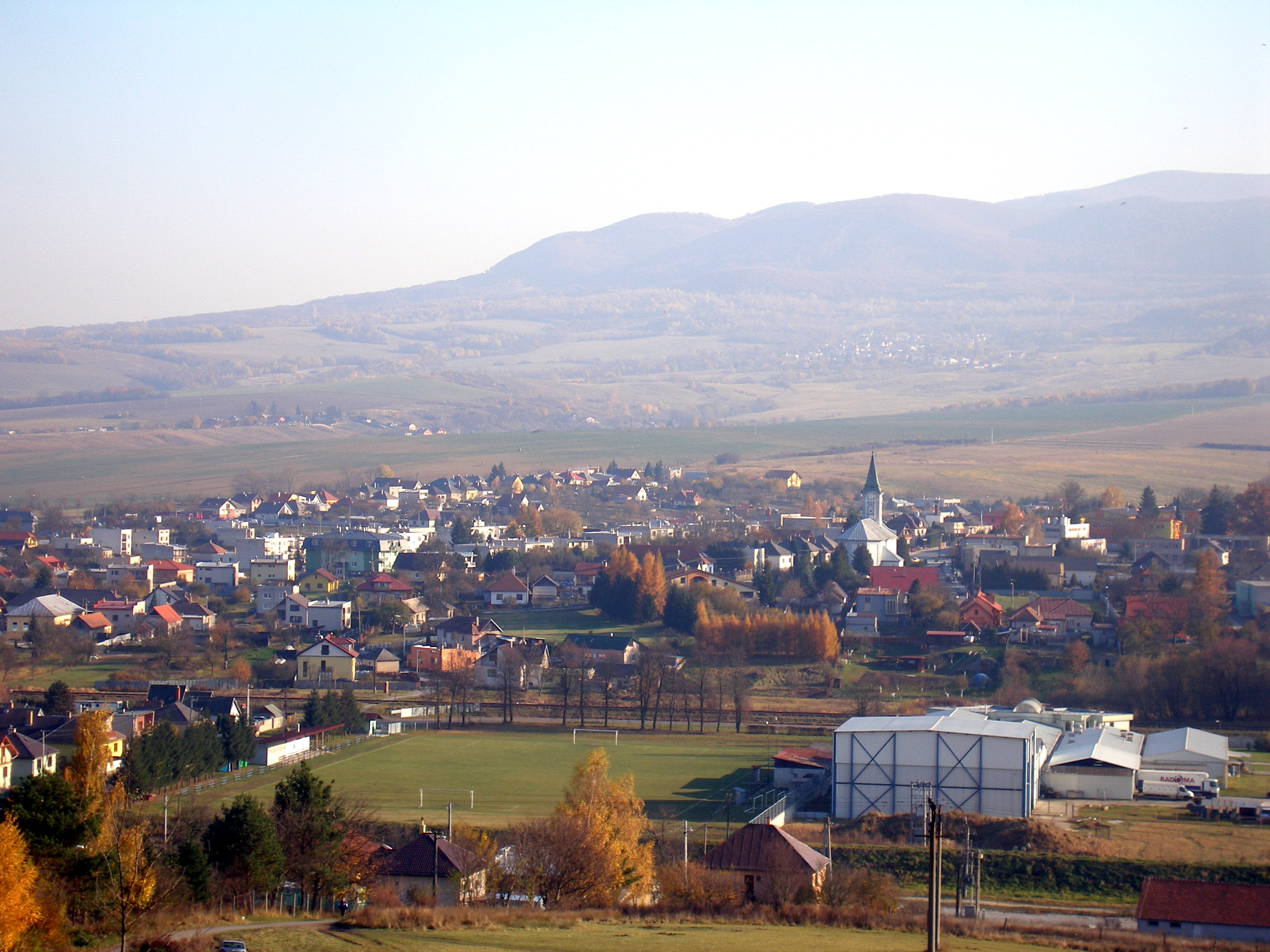

- Flag

- Location of Kapušany in the Prešov Region Location of Kapušany in Slovakia
- Coordinates: 49.04°N 21.33°E
- Country: Slovakia
- Region: Prešov Region
- District: Prešov District
- First mentioned: 1248

Area
  - Total: 11.57 km^{2} (4.47 sq mi)
- Elevation: 279 m (915 ft)

Population (2025)
  - Total: 2,152
- Time zone: UTC+1 (CET)
  - Summer (DST): UTC+2 (CEST)
- Postal code: 821 2
- Area code: +421 51
- Vehicle registration plate (until 2022): PO
- Website: www.kapusany.sk

Kapušany (Hungarian: Kapi) is a village and municipality in Prešov District in the Prešov Region of eastern Slovakia.

== History ==
In historical records the village was first mentioned in 1248.

== Geography ==
The municipality lies at an altitude of 279 metres (915 ft) and covers an area of 11.57 km^{2} (4.47 sq mi) (2025).

== Population ==
Population statistic (10 years)
Year	1995	2005	2015	2025
Count	1905	2098	2206	2152
Difference		+10.13%	+5.14%	−2.44%

Population statistic
Year	2024	2025
Count	2156	2152
Difference		−0.18%

It has a population of 2152 people (31 December 2025).

=== Ethnicity ===
Census 2021 (1+ %)
Ethnicity	Number	Fraction
Slovak	2132	97.48%
Not found out	48	2.19%
Romani	40	1.82%
Total	2187	

In year 2021 was 2187 people by ethnicity 2132 as Slovak, 48 as Not found out, 40 as Romani, 21 as Rusyn, 9 as Other, 5 as Czech, 5 as Italian, 3 as Ukrainian, 3 as Russian, 3 as English, 2 as Irish, 2 as Polish, 1 as Serbian, 1 as Hungarian and 1 as French.

Note on population: The difference values of population numbers in the table "Population statistic" and in the sections "Ethnicity" & "Religion" is caused by the use of various statistical methods.

=== Religion ===
Census 2021 (1+ %)
Religion	Number	Fraction
Roman Catholic Church	1837	84%
None	149	6.81%
Greek Catholic Church	107	4.89%
Not found out	45	2.06%
Evangelical Church	25	1.14%
Total	2187	

In year 2021 was 2187 people by religion 1837 from Roman Catholic Church, 149 from None, 107 from Greek Catholic Church, 45 from Not found out, 25 from Evangelical Church, 5 from Eastern Orthodox Church, 4 from Other and not ascertained christian church, 4 from Other, 3 from Calvinist Church, 3 from Ad hoc movements, 1 from Old Catholic Church, 1 from Jehovah's Witnesses, 1 from Christian Congregations in Slovakia, 1 from Hinduism and 1 from Buddhism.

== Popular Image ==
It is well known internationally through the popular polka tune, "Ja parobok z Kapušan" ("I am a bachelor from Kapusany").

== Genealogical resources ==
The records for genealogical research are available at the state archive "Statny Archiv in Presov, Slovakia"

- Roman Catholic church records (births/marriages/deaths): 1864–1895 (parish A)
- Greek Catholic church records (births/marriages/deaths): 1818–1895 (parish B)
- Lutheran church records (births/marriages/deaths): 1862–1895 (parish B)

== See also ==
- List of municipalities and towns in Slovakia
