= Cărbunari =

- Commune
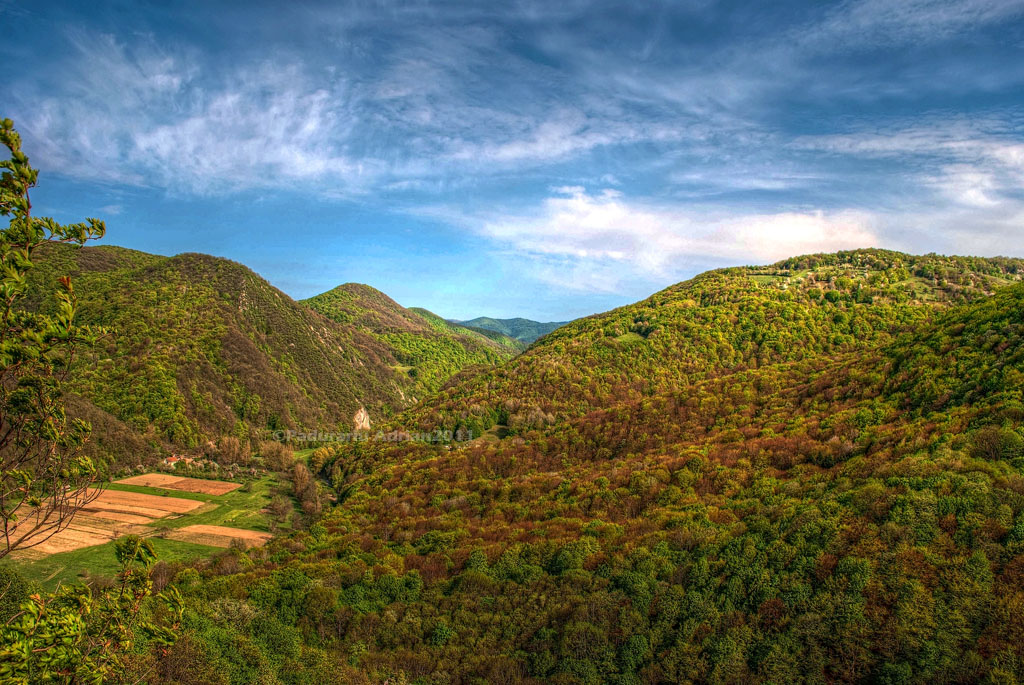

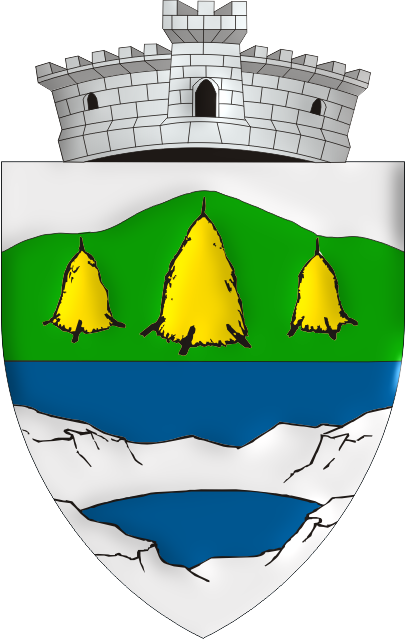
- Coat of arms

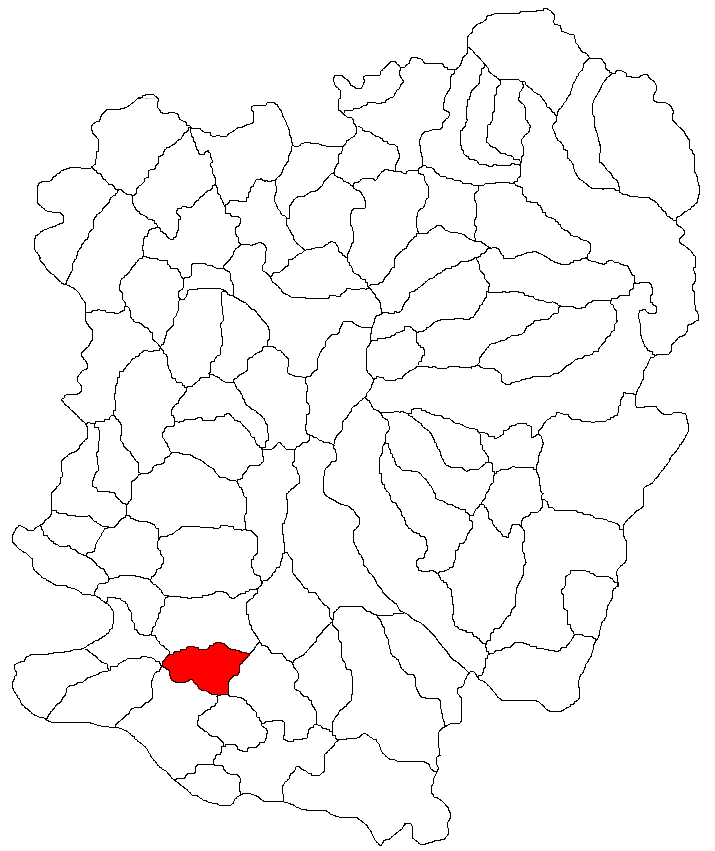
- Location in Caraș-Severin County

- Location in Romania
- Coordinates: 44°51′N 21°44′E
- Country: Romania
- County: Caraș-Severin

Government
  - Mayor (2024–2028): Gheorghe Prăsnescu (PSD)
- Area: 55.36 km^{2} (21.37 sq mi)
- Elevation: 552 m (1,811 ft)
- Population (2021-12-01): 785
  - Density: 14.2/km^{2} (36.7/sq mi)
- Time zone: UTC+02:00 (EET)
  - Summer (DST): UTC+03:00 (EEST)
- Postal code: 327071
- Area code: +(40) 02 55
- Vehicle reg.: CS
- Website: comuna-carbunari.ro

Cărbunari (Hungarian: Szenesfalu) is a commune in Caraș-Severin County, western Romania, with a population of 785 people as of 2021. It is composed of two villages, Cărbunari and Știnăpari (Máriahavas).

Historical population
Year	Pop.	±%
1880	1,643	—
1910	2,165	+31.8%
1930	2,510	+15.9%
1977	1,717	−31.6%
2002	1,282	−25.3%
2011	1,008	−21.4%
2021	785	−22.1%
Source: Census data
