= Paul III Šubić of Bribir =

Croatian noble (d. 1356)

Paul III Šubić of Bribir (Croatian: Pavao III Šubić Bribirski; † 1356.), was a member of the Croatian Šubić noble family.

== Family Connections ==
Paul III Šubić was son of Juraj II Šubić, and grandson of Paul I Šubić of Bribir who was the most powerful Croatian noble at the end of the 13th century and beginning of the 14th century. His sister Jelena Šubić was married to Regent of Bosnia Vladislav Kotromanić. He married Venetian Catherina Dandolo.

Paul III Šubić died in 1356 and was probably buried like his brother Mladen III Šubić in the Cathedral of St. Lawrence in Trogir.

== See also ==
- Šubić
- Klis Fortress
