= Elizabeth of Serbia =

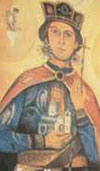

Baness consort of Bosnia
- Tenure: 1283–1314
- Died: c. 1331
- Spouse: Stephen I, Ban of Bosnia
- Issue: Stephen II, Ban of Bosnia; Vladislaus of Bosnia; Ninoslaus of Bosnia; Catherine of Bosnia; Mary of Bosnia; Miroslaus of Bosnia
- Dynasty: Nemanjić
- Father: Stefan Dragutin
- Mother: Catherine of Hungary

Elizabeth of Serbia (Serbian: Јелисаветa/Jelisaveta; fl. 1270 — died 1331) was Baness of Bosnia by her marriage to Stephen I, Ban of Bosnia. Elizabeth briefly ruled as regent for her eldest son, Stephen II, in 1314.

== Family ==
Elizabeth was a daughter of King Stefan Dragutin of the Nemanjić dynasty. Her mother was Catherine of Hungary. Elizabeth was the second of four children; her brother was Stephen Vladislav II of Syrmia.

== Life ==
After 1283, she married Stephen I Kotroman, Ban of Bosnia. Dragutin had already controlled two banates in Bosnia: Usora and Soli and Kotroman immediately fell under his influence – many of his acts were of Dragutin's command. The marriage was political and arranged by Ban Prijezda II who had attempted to forge an alliance with Stephen Dragutin (Elizabeth's father).

Elizabeth and Stephen had at least six children, all of whom are believed to have lived to adulthood:

- Stephen II (born 1292), Ban of Bosnia, whose daughter was Elizabeth, Queen of Hungary and Poland
- Vladislav (1295–1354), co-regent, whose son was Tvrtko I, the first King of Bosnia
- Ninoslav (born c. 1288 in Jajce), whose daughter was Mary, Countess of Helfenstein
- Miroslav
- Katarina (Catherine, born c. 1294 in Bribir–1355), who married Nikola of Hum before 1338, with issues Vladislav and Bogiša
- Marija (Mary, born c. 1308), who married Ludovik
- possibly, a son (born c. 1300–died c. 1331)

== Regency ==
After her husband's death in 1314, Elizabeth briefly ruled as regent for her eldest son, Stephen II. According to a 1601 source whose reliability is unknown, Elizabeth fled to the Republic of Ragusa (Dubrovnik) and died around 1331. Upon extinction of the Nemanjić dynasty, Elizabeth's grandson Tvrtko, Ban of Bosnia, had himself crowned King of Bosnia and King of Serbia based on his descent from Elizabeth.

== Sources ==
- Bataković, Dušan T., ed. (2005). Histoire du peuple serbe [History of the Serbian People] (in French). Lausanne: L’Age d’Homme. ISBN 9782825119587.
- Ćirković, Sima (2004). The Serbs. Malden: Blackwell Publishing. ISBN 9781405142915.
- Fine, John Van Antwerp Jr. (1994) [1987]. The Late Medieval Balkans: A Critical Survey from the Late Twelfth Century to the Ottoman Conquest. Ann Arbor, Michigan: University of Michigan Press. ISBN 0472082604.
- Jireček, Constantin (1911). Geschichte der Serben. Vol. 1. Gotha: Perthes.
- Krstić, Aleksandar R. (2016). "The Rival and the Vassal of Charles Robert of Anjou: King Vladislav II Nemanjić". Banatica. 26 (2): 33–51.

Royal titles
Vacant Title last held by unknown	Baness consort of Bosnia; 1283–1314	Vacant Title next held by Elizabeth of Kuyavia
