= Tvrtko I of Bosnia =

First king of Bosnia from 1377 to 1391

Tvrtko I
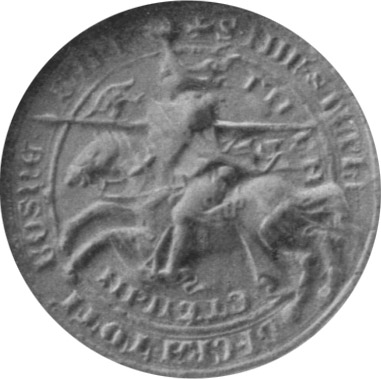
- Seal of King Tvrtko I

Ban of Bosnia
- Reign: September 1353 – October 1377 (interrupted by Vuk, 1366–1367)
- Predecessor: Stephen II

King of Bosnia
- Reign: October 1377 – 10 March 1391
- Coronation: (26 October?) 1377
- Successor: Dabiša
- Born: c. 1338
- Died: 10 March 1391 (aged 52–53)
- Burial: Mile, Visoko
- Spouse: Dorothea of Bulgaria
- Issue: Tvrtko II of Bosnia
- House: Kotromanić
- Father: Vladislav of Bosnia
- Mother: Jelena of Bribir
- Religion: Roman Catholic

Stephen Tvrtko I (Serbo-Croatian: Stjepan/Stefan Tvrtko / Стјепан/Стефан Твртко; c. 1338 – 10 March 1391) was the first king of Bosnia. A member of the House of Kotromanić, he succeeded his uncle Stephen II as the ban of Bosnia in 1353. As he was a minor at the time, Tvrtko's father, Vladislav, briefly ruled as regent, followed by Tvrtko's mother, Jelena. Early in his personal rule, Tvrtko quarrelled with his country's Roman Catholic clergy but later enjoyed cordial relations with all the religious communities in his realm. After initial difficulties—the loss of large parts of Bosnia to his overlord, King Louis I of Hungary, and being briefly deposed by his magnates—Tvrtko's power grew considerably. He conquered some remnants of the neighbouring Serbian Empire in 1373, after the death of its last ruler and his distant relative, Uroš the Weak. In 1377, he had himself crowned king of Bosnia and Serbia, claiming to be the heir of Serbia's extinct Nemanjić dynasty.

As the Kingdom of Bosnia continued to expand, Tvrtko's attention shifted to the Adriatic coast. He gained control of the entire Primorje region and the major maritime cities of the area, established new settlements and started building a navy, but never succeeded in subjugating the lords of the independent Serbian territories. The death of King Louis and the accession of Queen Mary in 1382 allowed Tvrtko to take advantage of the ensuing succession crisis in Hungary and Croatia. After bitter fighting, from 1385 to 1390, Tvrtko succeeded in conquering large parts of Dalmatia, and Croatia proper. Following the Battle of Kosovo in 1389, his tenuous claim to Serbia became a mere fiction, as the Serbian rulers he sought to subdue became vassals of the victorious Ottoman Empire. The Ottoman Turks also launched their first attacks on Bosnia during Tvrtko's reign, but his army was able to repel them. Tvrtko's sudden death in 1391 prevented him from solidifying the Kotromanić hold on Croatian lands.

Tvrtko is widely considered one of Bosnia's greatest medieval rulers, having enlarged the country's borders to their greatest extent, left a strong economy, and improved the living standards of his subjects. He was survived by at least one son, Tvrtko II, but was succeeded by Dabiša, under whom Tvrtko's burgeoning realm began to decay.

== Minority ==
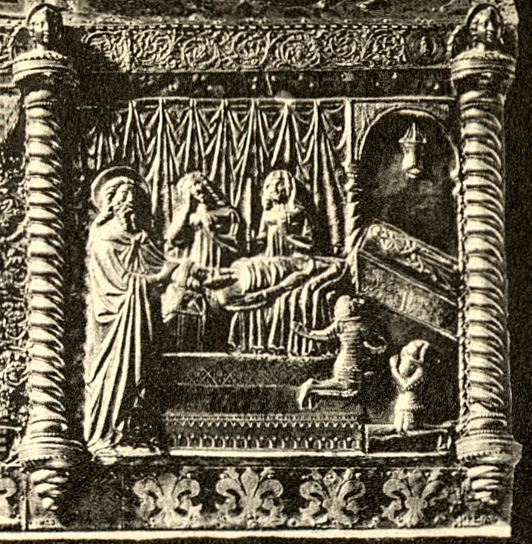
Tvrtko with his mother, brother and cousin Elizabeth at the deathbed of his uncle Stephen, as depicted on the Chest of Saint Simeon, dated 1380.

Tvrtko was the elder son of Vladislav Kotromanić and Jelena Šubić and was likely born within a year of their marriage, which was celebrated in 1337. His father was the brother of the Bosnian ban, Stephen II, and his mother the daughter of the Croatian lord George II Šubić of Bribir. Although Vladislav was still alive, Stephen's title passed directly to Tvrtko; the reason for Vladislav's exclusion from the Kotromanić succession is unclear. Tvrtko, however, was only about fifteen years old at the time, so his father governed as regent. Soon after his accession, Tvrtko travelled with his father throughout the realm to settle relations with his vassals. Jelena replaced Vladislav as regent upon his death in 1354. She immediately travelled to Hungary to obtain consent to Tvrtko's accession from King Louis I, his overlord. Following her return, Jelena held an assembly (stanak) in Mile, with mother and son confirming the possessions and privileges of the noblemen of "all of Bosnia, Donji Kraji, Zagorje, and the Hum land".

The death of Tvrtko's maternal uncle Mladen III Šubić in 1348 led to a decline of the Šubić noble family and a long conflict over their lands. In May 1355, Jelena and Tvrtko marched with an army to Duvno in order to claim Tvrtko's share of her brother's patrimony. An agreement was reached with the vice-ban of Dalmatia by which Tvrtko was to inherit all the cities held by his maternal grandfather and a city which belonged to his aunt Katarina. Still, it is unknown whether he actually took possession of them.

The state assembled by Tvrtko's uncle Stephen broke apart on Tvrtko's accession, much to the satisfaction of his overlord King Louis. The Hungarians were keen to encourage Stephen's vassals to act independently from Tvrtko, forcing Tvrtko to compete with Louis for their loyalty in order to rebuild the Bosnian state. Louis posed a more direct threat as well; he was determined to enlarge his royal domain, and throughout his realm he ardently reclaimed all lands that once belonged to the monarch. Taking advantage of the precarious situation early in Tvrtko's reign, Louis moved to claim most of Donji Kraji and western Hum up to the river Neretva, including the prosperous customs town of Drijeva. In 1357, he succeeded in compelling Tvrtko to come to Hungary and surrender these territories as the dowry of Stephen's daughter Elizabeth, who had been married to Louis since 1353. In July, King Louis confirmed Tvrtko and his younger brother Vuk as rulers of Bosnia and Usora. Donji Kraji and Hum were purposely omitted from their title, with Usora likely having been granted as compensation. Two conditions were forced upon the Bosnians: one of the two Kotromanić brothers would be at Louis's court whenever the other was in Bosnia, and they would make an effort to suppress the "heretical" Bosnian Church.

== Initial difficulties ==
Little is known about internal affairs in Bosnia between 1357 when Tvrtko started ruling on his own and 1363. His religious policy came into focus in this period, as the Avignon papacy became more insistent on curbing the Bosnian Church. This endangered Tvrtko, for although he was a Roman Catholic throughout his life, Louis now had a religious pretext for invading Bosnia. The death of the bishop of Bosnia—Peregrin Saxon, a supporter of both Stephen II and Tvrtko I and acknowledged by the latter as his "spiritual father"—led to the appointment of Peter Siklósi to the episcopal throne. Peter actively promoted the idea of launching a new crusade against Bosnia, earning him Tvrtko's hostility. Tvrtko even attempted to plot against Peter but failed when his letters to a lector in Peter's Đakovo residence were discovered. The Bosnian Church, meanwhile, survived throughout Tvrtko's reign but only became prominent in state affairs after his death. One hostile source even tried to link Tvrtko himself to the Church due to his tolerance of all local faiths, including Hum's Eastern Orthodoxy.

Louis I of Hungary's first seal, infamously lost (officially "stolen") during his campaign against Bosnia

At the start of his personal rule, the young Ban somehow considerably increased his power. Although he constantly emphasized his subservience and loyalty to the King, Tvrtko started regarding the loyalty of the Donji Kraji noblemen to Louis as treachery against himself. In 1363, a conflict broke out between the two men. The cause is not clear, although Louis stated that his intention was to eradicate the Bosnian heretics. By April, the King had begun amassing an army; and in May, officials of the Republic of Ragusa ordered their merchants to leave Bosnia due to an imminent clash. An army led by Louis himself attacked Donji Kraji, where the nobility was divided in its loyalties between Tvrtko and Louis. A month later an army led by the palatine of Hungary, Nicholas Kont, and the archbishop of Esztergom, Nicholas Apáti, struck Usora. Vlatko Vukoslavić deserted to Louis and surrendered to him the important fortress of Ključ, but Vukac Hrvatinić succeeded in defending the Soko Grad fortress in the župa of Pliva, forcing the Hungarians to retreat. In Usora, the Srebrenik Fortress held out against a "massive attack" by the royal army, which suffered the embarrassment of losing the King's seal. The successful defense of Srebrenik marked Tvrtko's first victory against Hungary.

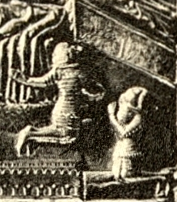
Tvrtko and his brother Vuk on Saint Simeon's chest (detail of the scene depicting Stephen II's death)

The unity of the Bosnian magnates waned as soon as the Hungarians were defeated, weakening Tvrtko's position and that of a united Bosnia. In 1364, Tvrtko, his mother, and his brother were granted citizenship of the Republic of Venice, an honour that guaranteed them sanctuary in Venice in case of necessity but also obligated Tvrtko to protect Venetian merchants. Various charters issued by the previous bans of Bosnia, and confirmed by Tvrtko on his accession, promised the same protection to Ragusan merchants. In late 1365, however, both republics complained to Tvrtko about the treatment of their merchants by his vassals. Evidently, the Ban had lost control over his feudatories. The anarchy escalated, and in February of the following year, the magnates revolted against Tvrtko and dethroned him. Little is known about the circumstances under which Tvrtko was deposed. Accusing the magnates of treachery against "foremostly God" and himself, Tvrtko fled Bosnia with his mother. He was replaced by his younger brother, who had hitherto functioned as "junior ban". Vuk's personal role in the rebellion is uncertain.

Tvrtko acted resolutely and efficiently. He and Jelena took refuge at the Hungarian royal court, where they were welcomed by Tvrtko's former enemy and overlord, King Louis. Apparently dissatisfied with the turn of events in Bosnia, Louis provided Tvrtko with aid (likely military) in reclaiming Bosnia. Tvrtko returned to Bosnia in March and reestablished control over a part of the country by the end of the month, including the areas of Donji Kraji, Rama (where he then resided), Hum, and Usora. In order to secure the loyalty of the noblemen he had subjugated, as well as to win over those still supporting Vuk, Tvrtko bestowed a number of grants; in August he invested Vukac Hrvatinić with the entire župa of Pliva for his part in the 1363 war with Hungary. After initially rapid success, Tvrtko's campaign slowed. Sanko Miltenović, ruler of eastern Hum, defected to Vuk in late 1366. Throughout the following year, Tvrtko forced Vuk southwards, eventually compelling him to flee to Ragusa. Sanko, Vuk's last supporter, submitted to Tvrtko in late summer and was allowed to retain his holdings. Ragusan officials made an effort to procure peace between the feuding brothers, and in 1368, Vuk asked Pope Urban V to intervene with King Louis I on his behalf. Those efforts were futile; but by 1374, Tvrtko had reconciled with Vuk on very generous terms.

== Conquests in Serbia and marriage ==
The death of Dušan the Mighty and the accession of his son Uroš the Weak in December 1355 was soon followed by the breakup of the once-powerful and threatening Serbian Empire. It disintegrated into autonomous lordships that could not resist Bosnia by themselves. This paved the way for Tvrtko to expand towards the east, but internal problems prevented him from seizing the opportunity immediately. A lordship on Bosnia's eastern border was that of Vojislav Vojinović. When Vojislav attacked Ragusa in 1361, the republic appealed to Tvrtko for help, but to no avail. Vojislav's widow Gojislava, ruling on behalf of their minor sons, provided Tvrtko with passage through the family's land during his struggle with Vuk, and Tvrtko remained cordial with the family. He was, however, unable to defend her from her nephew Nicholas Altomanović, who, by November 1368, had seized her sons' lands. All Tvrtko could do was help the dispossessed widow safely reach her native Albania.

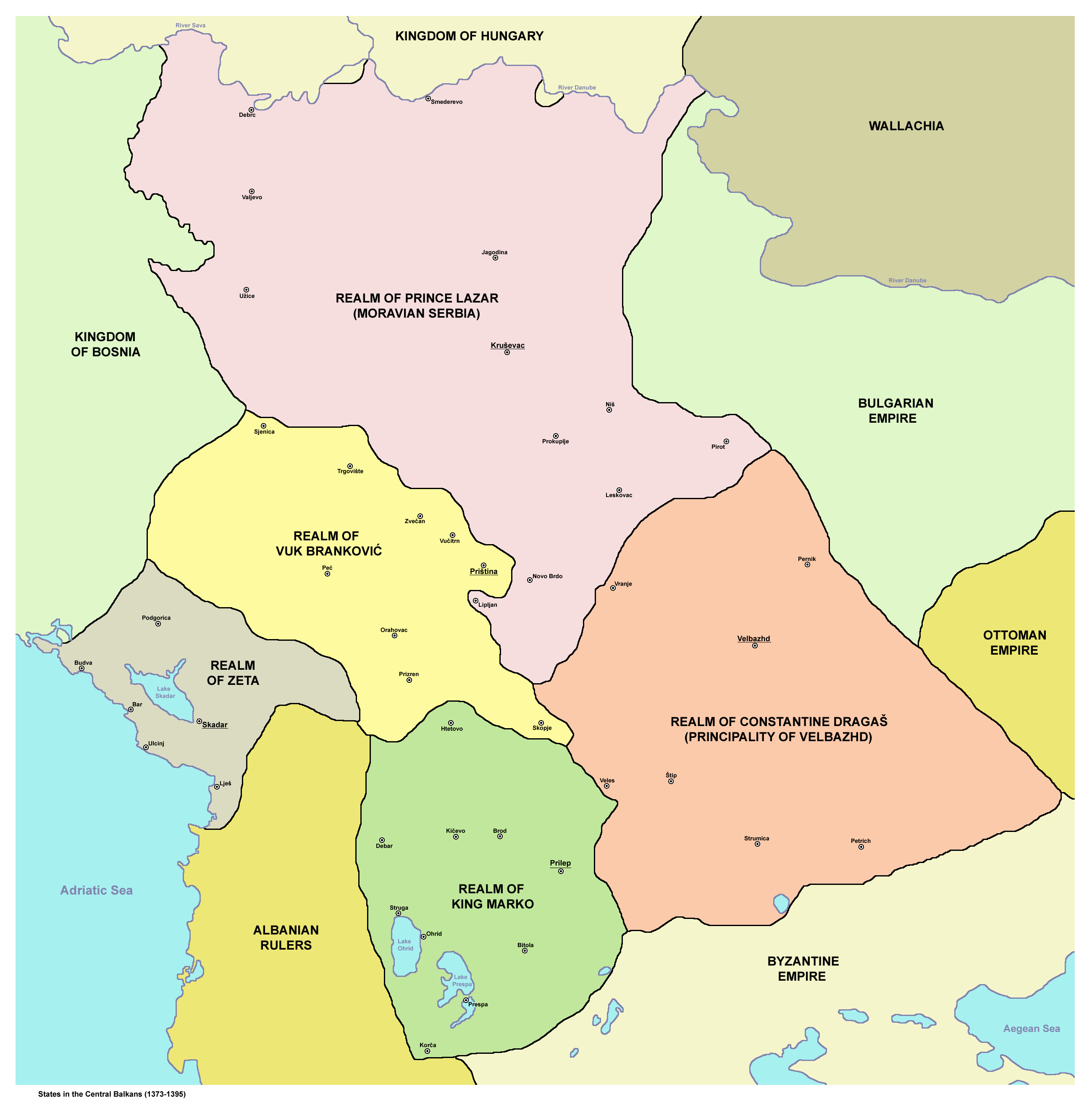
Division of the Serbian Empire between Bosnia and Serbian regional lords after 1374

The ambitious Nicholas soon started inciting rebellions against Tvrtko; Sanko Miltenović rose against his lord again and was once more defeated and pardoned in 1369. Tvrtko and Nicholas made peace in August 1370, but the latter's belligerence soon earned him the enmity of all his neighbours. Entering into a coalition with Venice and the Lord of Zeta, Đurađ I, Nicholas intended to attack Ragusa and Kotor. Tvrtko and Lazar Hrebljanović, lord of Moravian Serbia, both backed by Louis of Hungary, acted to protect the cities. Lazar, too, swore fealty to Louis, after which he and Tvrtko were given 1,000 horsemen to counter Nicholas, who was completely defeated in the autumn of 1373, his lands being divided between the victorious allies. Tvrtko took the upper Podrinje, Gacko, and a part of Polimlje with the Mileševa Monastery. This was the first significant expansion of Bosnia during Tvrtko's reign and gave him substantial influence over Serbian affairs.

In 1374, Tvrtko married Dorothea, daughter of Tsar Ivan Stratsimir of Bulgaria. The marriage was likely arranged by Louis, who had kept Dorothea and her sister as honored hostages at his court to ensure Ivan Stratsimir's loyalty. The bride was Orthodox, but the marriage was celebrated in the Catholic rite by Tvrtko's old enemy Peter, bishop of Bosnia, to whom Tvrtko then awarded large tracts of land. Tvrtko thereby solidified his relations with the Roman Catholic Church and earned recognition from Pope Gregory XI.

The division of Nicholas Altomanović's lands created friction between Tvrtko and Đurađ I Balšić since the latter seized coastal župas, which Tvrtko had expected to annex. In early 1377, Tvrtko successfully plotted with the Travunians the takeover of Trebinje, Konavli, and Dračevica, making his final conquests of the Serbian lands. By that time, Serbia had been reduced to a patchwork of independent lordships.

== Coronation ==
Uroš the Weak, the last of the Nemanjić dynasty, died in December 1371. His chosen co-ruler, Vukašin Mrnjavčević, left a son, Marko, who took up the royal title. Having been forced to accept Ottoman suzerainty, Marko was not recognized as king by any of the Serbian magnates, effectively leaving the throne vacant. Serbia was divided between Marko (whose small realm extended no further than western Macedonia), Lazar (the greatest lord), Vuk Branković (Lazar's son-in-law), George of Zeta, and Tvrtko of Bosnia. The idea of restoring the Serbian Empire nevertheless persisted. George discussed it in one of his charters, but the Serbian regional lords were not considered suitable. They had only recently risen to prominence and lacked illustrious family backgrounds and formal titles to their lands; they were mere "lords". Tvrtko not only controlled a significant portion of Serbia but was a member of the dynasty which had ruled as bans of Bosnia from time immemorial and—most importantly—could boast descent from the Nemanjić dynasty. A genealogy published in Tvrtko's newly conquered Serbian lands emphasized his Nemanjić ancestry, derived from his paternal grandmother, Elizabeth, daughter of King Dragutin. A Serbian logothete named Blagoje, having found refuge at Tvrtko's court, attributed to Tvrtko the right to a "double crown": one for Bosnia, which his family had ruled since its foundation, and the other for the Serbian lands of his Nemanjić ancestors, who had "left the earthly realm for the heavenly kingdom". Arguing that Serbia had been "left without its pastor", Tvrtko set out to be crowned as its king.

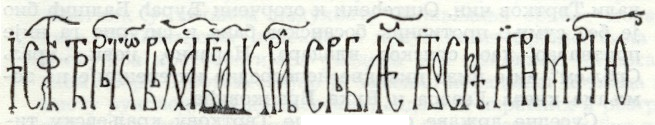
Tvrtko I's signature, identifying him as "king of the Serbs and of Bosnia and of Primorie"

Tvrtko's coronation as King of Bosnia and Serbia was held in the fall of 1377 (probably 26 October, the feast day of Saint Demetrius), but there is no consensus as to where it took place. The Ragusan chronicler Mavro Orbini wrote, in 1601, that the coronation was performed in the Serbian monastery of Mileševa by its Orthodox metropolitan bishop, an opinion accepted today only in Serbian historiography. Citing more recent archaeological and historical research, Croatian and Bosnian historians agree that the coronation more likely took place in the Franciscan Church of Saint Nicholas in the Bosnian town of Mile, which is the undisputed place of the coronations of Tvrtko I's successors.

Writing to Ragusa shortly after his coronation, Tvrtko successfully claimed Saint Demetrius' income, which had been paid to the kings of Serbia since the 13th century. Although he presented himself as the heir to the Nemanjić crown, Tvrtko decided to assume the royal title of his great-grandfather, rather than continue Dušan's unpopular claim to an imperial style, thus becoming "by the Grace of God king of the Serbs, Bosnia, Pomorje and the Western Areas". In addition to the royal title, Tvrtko also adopted the symbolic name Stephen in order to associate himself with the Nemanjić kings; his successors followed suit. Tvrtko, at times, completely omitted his birth name and used only the honorific. Tvrtko's right to kingship was derived from his right to the Serbian throne, and was likely recognized by Lazar Hrebljanović and Vuk Branković. Still, Tvrtko never established authority over the regional lords of Serbia. Tvrtko's new title was also approved by Louis and by his successor Mary. Venice and Ragusa consistently referred to Tvrtko as king of Rascia, Ragusa even complaining, in 1378, about Tvrtko's preoccupation with his new kingdom. Despite his cordial relations with its clergy, Tvrtko's claim to Serbia did not enjoy the support of the Orthodox Church, severely hindering Tvrtko's efforts.

== Economy ==
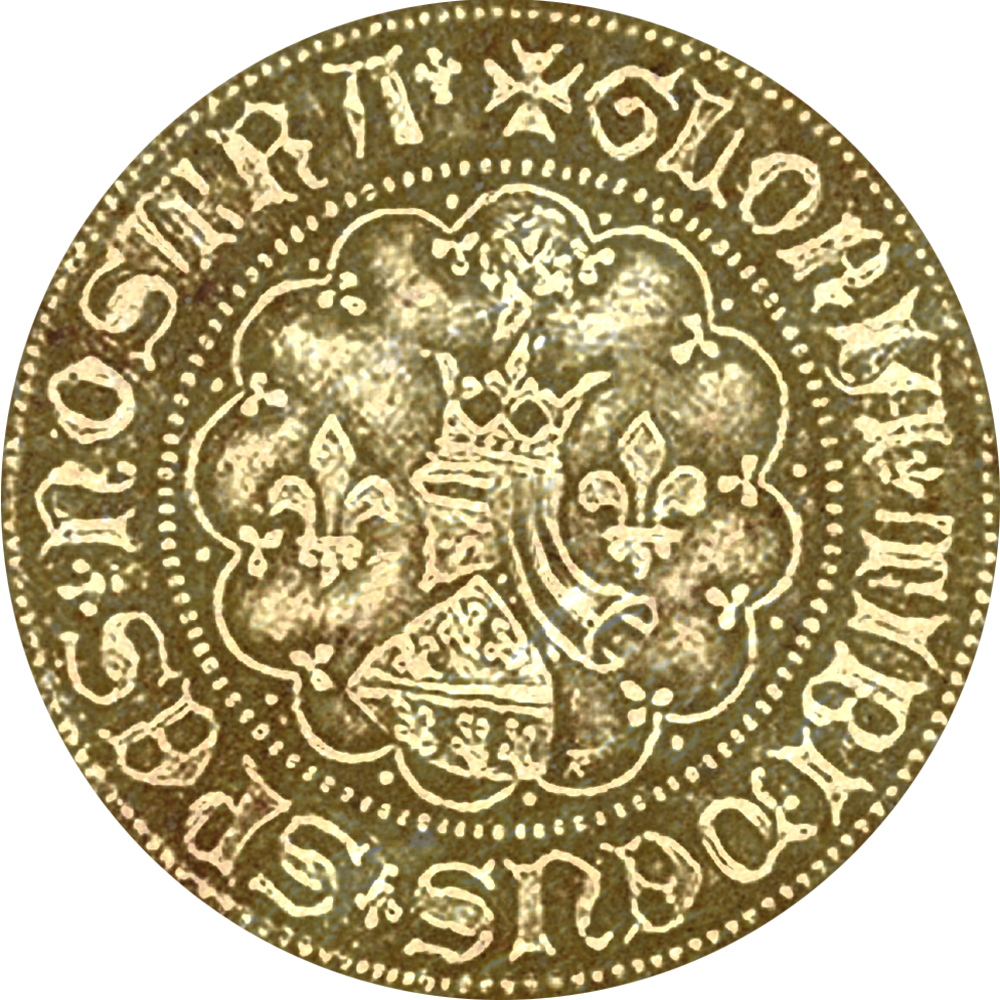
Tvrtko's coin, featuring fleur-de-lis and his coat of arms

Having taken as much Serbian land as he could, King Tvrtko turned his attention to the coast. The rapid economic growth of Bosnia, having begun during the reign of Tvrtko's uncle, continued unabated even during the political upheavals that followed Tvrtko's accession. The export of metal ores and metalwork (mainly silver, copper and lead) formed the backbone of the Bosnian economy. These goods were transported over the Dinaric Alps to the seashore, where they were bought chiefly by the Republics of Ragusa and Venice. The maritime cities of Ragusa and Kotor also depended on Tvrtko's realm for food, a dependency the King leveraged to increase the initially low and, for the Bosnians, disadvantageous prices. Yet, Bosnia could not make economical use of its share of the Adriatic coast, from the river Neretva to the Bay of Kotor, which lacked any major settlements. The three major cities in the area were all controlled by Hungary: Drijeva (which Tvrtko was forced to cede to Louis in 1357), Ragusa, and Kotor.

The War of Chioggia erupted between the old-time rival Republics of Venice and Genoa in 1378, and it soon involved Venice's neighbours. King Louis took Genoa's side, and Ragusa—subordinate to Hungary, and Venice's competitor in the Adriatic—did so as well. The Venetians, having taken Kotor in August 1378, made an effort to have Tvrtko join the war on their side, which caused panic in Ragusa. Tvrtko, however, offered the Ragusans help in fighting Venice, which they initially refused. The death of George I of Zeta warranted Tvrtko's involvement in Serbian affairs, which reduced his ability to take an active part in the conflict. The Ragusans started calling for the destruction of Kotor, whose officials promised to renounce fealty to Venice and return to Louis. Kotor failed to fulfil this promise but instead promised fealty to Tvrtko, who laid claim to the city as part of his Nemanjić ancestors' heritage. The political climate was ideal since he was to take Kotor from his overlord's enemy. The Ragusans were furious, and an embargo ensued. Tvrtko defended Kotor from Ragusa but was betrayed in June 1379, when the city overthrew its Venetian governor and submitted again directly to Louis.

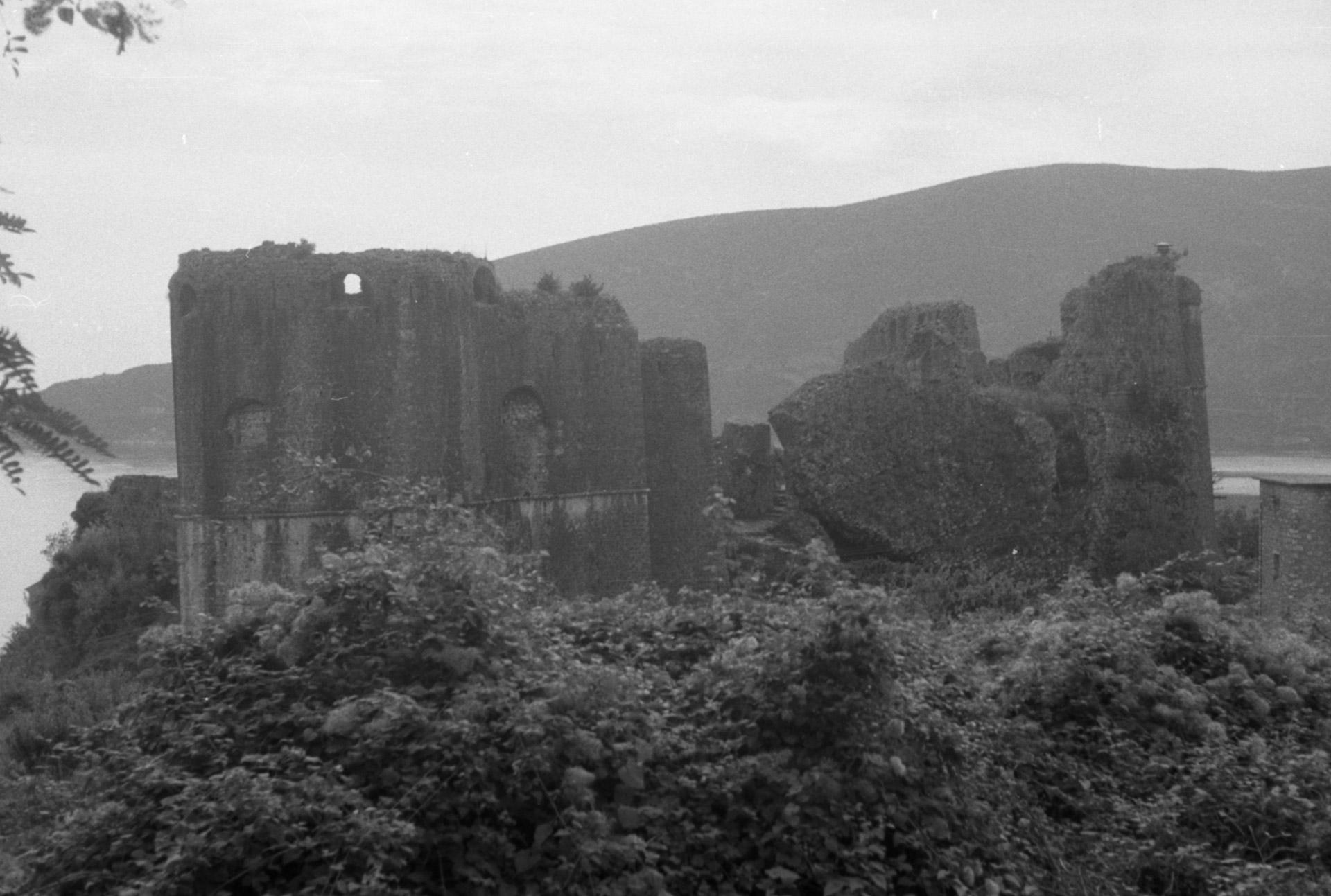
Fortress of Novi, built by Tvrtko I in 1382, with its newly founded port immediately became an economic hub of the kingdom.

The failure to seize Kotor, the damage to the Bosnian economy from the Ragusan embargo, and the need for easier access to maritime trade led Tvrtko to found the youngest medieval town on the eastern Adriatic coast. In early 1382, Tvrtko constructed a new fortress in the Bay of Kotor and decided that it should form the basis of a new salt trading center. Initially named after Saint Stephen, the city came to be known as Novi (meaning "new"). Commerce started in August, when the first ships carrying salt arrived, but so did trouble. Kotor and the merchants from Dalmatia and the Italian Peninsula looked favourably on the development, but the Ragusans were very displeased at the prospect of losing their salt trade monopoly. They argued that Tvrtko, as king of Serbia, should respect the exclusive rights to salt trade granted by his Nemanjić predecessors to Ragusa, Kotor, Drijeva, and Sveti Srđ. During the dispute, Ragusa hindered Novi's commerce and assembled an alliance of Dalmatian cities against Bosnia and Venice. Tvrtko relented by November, and his new city failed to achieve his purpose.

== Hungarian succession crisis ==
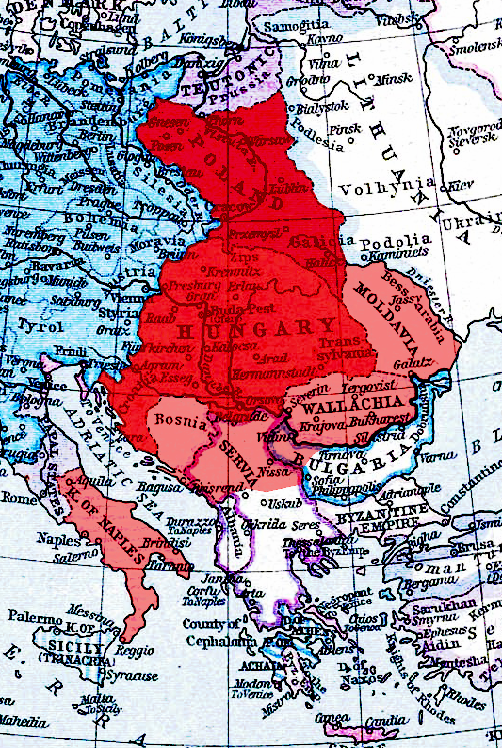
Louis's realm (red) with dependent and claimed territories, including Tvrtko's Bosnia (pink)

Tvrtko's yielding in the legal dispute with Ragusa may have been brought about by another major change: the death of King Louis I on 11 September 1382. Without a male heir, the Hungarian crown passed to Louis's 13-year-old daughter Mary and the reins of government to his widow, Tvrtko's cousin Elizabeth. The great unpopularity of the queens led to rebellions and presented an opportunity for Tvrtko, not only to reclaim Drijeva and other lands lost to Louis in 1357 but also to seize Kotor. When exactly or how this took place is not known. Already in the spring of 1383, Tvrtko started building a navy: he bought a galley from Venice, ordered two more to be built, and employed a Venetian patrician as his admiral with the consent of the republic. Around the same time, he erected a new town, Brštanik, near present-day Opuzen.

In 1385, Tvrtko still formally recognized Hungarian supremacy, although it no longer had any practical meaning. He emphasized his loyalty to the queens, "his dearest sisters", and cited his oath of fealty to them. Mary and Elizabeth, however, had no power to enforce their suzerainty over him. In fact, they so respected his strength that they made concessions to win his favour: one of the concessions being their recognition of Tvrtko's possession of Kotor in the spring of 1385. The incorporation of the trade centres of Drijeva and Kotor did not result in a significant expansion on the coast, but it was of great importance to the Bosnian economy and the King's finances.

The capture of Kotor earned Tvrtko the enmity of George I of Zeta's brother and successor, Balša II, who also desired the city. Nothing is known about Balša's military conflict with Tvrtko except that the latter asked Venice, whose trading opportunities were threatened by the clashes, to mediate with the Lord of Zeta. The mediation was thwarted by Balša's death in the 1385 Battle of Savra against the invading Ottomans. Balša's nephew and successor, George II, maintained Zeta's hostility toward Bosnia.

The revolt against Elizabeth and Mary culminated in late 1385 when Mary was deposed in favour of her kinsman, King Charles III of Naples. Elizabeth had Charles assassinated the following February, and Mary was restored to the throne. On 25 July, however, both women ended up imprisoned by the supporters of the murdered monarch's son, King Ladislaus of Naples. Civil war engulfed Mary's realm. Her betrothed, Sigismund, invaded Bohemia with the intent to liberate her and ascend her throne. The neighbouring countries took sides: Venice opted for the queens and Sigismund, but Tvrtko chose to support their opponents and Ladislaus's claim to Hungary, thus tacitly renouncing vassalage that had in any case been only nominal since c. 1370. Elizabeth was strangled in prison, while Sigismund's coronation as King of Hungary in March 1387 and subsequent liberation of Mary prompted Tvrtko to act more resolutely. From Ragusa, still loyal to Queen Mary, exacted a promise of support against everyone but the Queen. From then on, he was free to attack Dalmatia, ostensibly in the name of the king of Naples.

Tvrtko I's coat of arms

Dalmatian cities remained loyal to Mary and Sigismund, not least thanks to the couple's alliance with Venice. A notable exception was Klis, which supported the rebellious nobleman John of Palisna. Tvrtko took control of the Klis Fortress in July 1387, which enabled him to launch attacks on Split. Although the Bosnian army laid waste to Split and Zadar areas, the cities refused to capitulate. Their officials were willing to honour King Tvrtko but insisted that Queen Mary and King Sigismund were their legitimate sovereigns. Ostrovica Fortress submitted to Tvrtko in November, followed by Trogir.

The military forces of Tvrtko and his vassal Hrvoje Vukčić Hrvatinić campaigned in Slavonia together with John and Paul Horvat.

By 1388, the devastation of Dalmatia by the Bosnian army had become so severe that the authorities of the cities pleaded with Sigismund to either help them or to allow them to save themselves by submitting without being labelled as traitors. Neither Sigismund's army nor an alliance of Dalmatian cities and noblemen was able to counter Tvrtko's advances. Split, Zadar, and Šibenik having lost all hope, Tvrtko called upon them to negotiate their surrender in March 1389. Each city asked to be the last one to submit and even to be allowed to request Sigismund's assistance. Tvrtko granted their wish and decided that Split should be the last to submit by 15 June 1389.

== Ottoman attacks ==
During his campaign in Dalmatia and Croatia, Tvrtko was also engaged in skirmishes in the east of his realm, preventing him from focusing all of his manpower on expansion westwards. The Kingdom of Bosnia was believed to be far from the reach of the Ottomans during Tvrtko I's reign, shielded by a belt of independent Serbian statelets. George II of Zeta, however, purposely enabled the Turks to launch raids against Bosnia, first in 1386 (of which little is known) and again in 1388. In the second instance, the Ottoman and Zetan invaders, led by Lala Şahin Pasha, penetrated as far as Bileća. The Battle of Bileća, which took place in late August 1388, ended with the victory of the Bosnian army, led by Duke Vlatko Vuković.

15 June 1389, the date by which Tvrtko had intended to complete his conquest of Dalmatia, was also the day when the Ottoman army met the forces of a coalition of Serbian states at the Battle of Kosovo. Tvrtko, feeling it is his duty as king of Serbia, ordered his army to leave Dalmatia and assist the lord's Lazar Hrebljanović and Vuk Branković. He resented the Milanese ruler, Gian Galeazzo Visconti, for selling weaponry to the Ottomans in wake of the battle. The highest ranking among the casualties, which also included Bosnian noblemen, were Lazar and the Ottoman ruler Murad I. The outcome of the battle was difficult to ascertain, but Vlatko's letters from the battlefield convinced Tvrtko that the Christian alliance came out victorious. Tvrtko, in turn, informed various Christian states of his great triumph; the authorities of the Republic of Florence responded praising both the Kingdom of Bosnia and its king for achieving a "victory so glorious that the memory of it would never fade". The triumph, however, was hollow. Tvrtko's Serbian title lost what little actual significance it had when Lazar's successors accepted Ottoman suzerainty, while Vuk Branković turned to Tvrtko's enemy Sigismund. Since the Battle of Kosovo, the Bosnian claim to the Serbian throne was merely nominal.

== Final achievements and aftermath ==
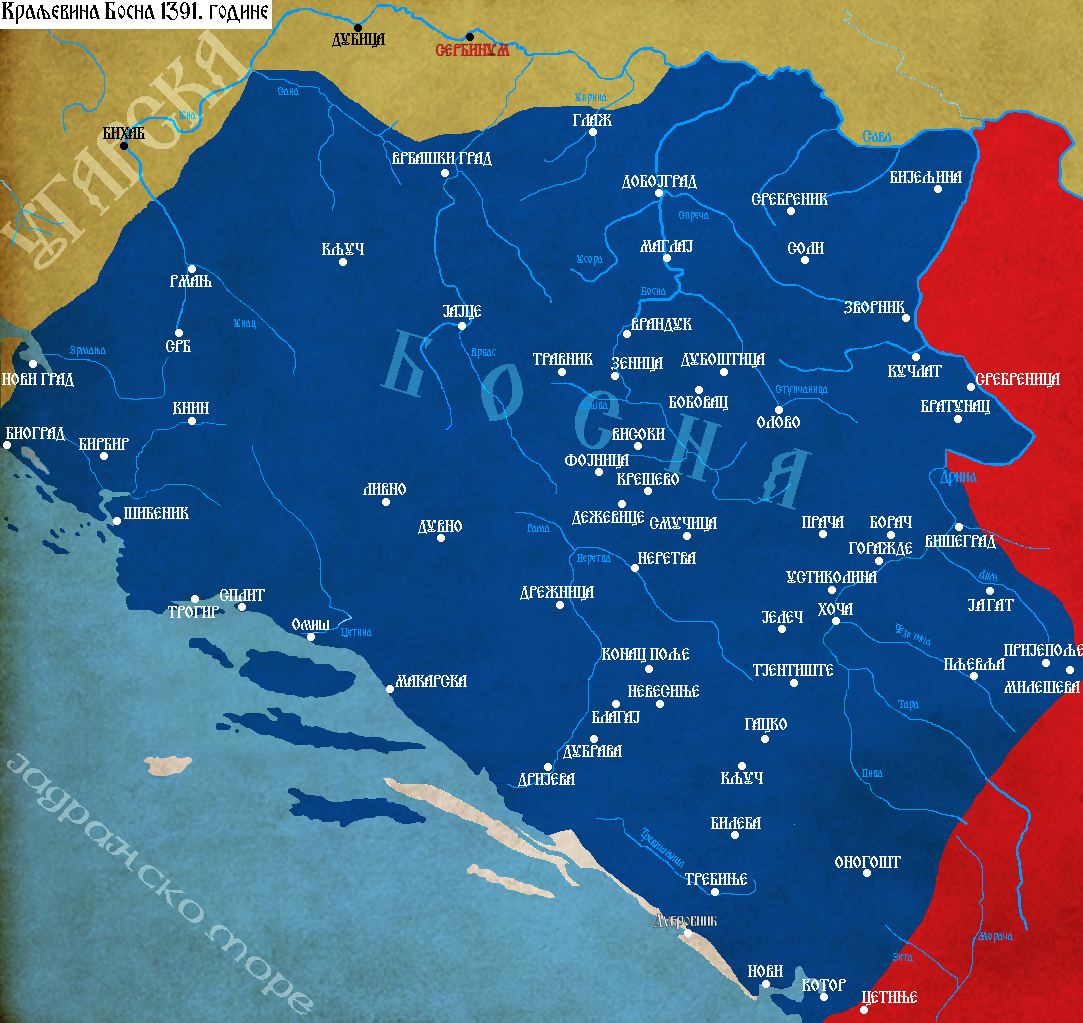
Map of Bosnia at its greatest extent, under Tvrtko I in 1390.

Tvrtko's engagement in the east allowed Sigismund's forces to reverse some of his gains in Dalmatia. Klis was briefly lost in July, the Dalmatian cities again refused to surrender, and Tvrtko was forced to relaunch raids. A series of battles and skirmishes from November to December resulted in a decisive Bosnian victory and the retreat of the Hungarian army. In May 1390, the cities and the Dalmatian islands finally surrendered to Tvrtko, who then started calling himself "by the grace of God king of Rascia, Bosnia, Dalmatia, Croatia, and Pomorje". Acting as king of Dalmatia and Croatia, Tvrtko appointed his supporters John of Palisna and John Horvat as his bans and hosted the Archbishop of Split Andrea Gualdo in Sutjeska.

In the last months of his reign, Tvrtko devoted himself to solidifying his position in Dalmatia and to plans for taking Zadar, the only Dalmatian city that had evaded his rule. He offered an extensive alliance to Venice, but it did not suit the republic's interests. Meanwhile, Tvrtko was also fostering relations with Albert III, Duke of Austria. By the late summer of 1390, a marriage was expected to be contracted between the recently widowed Tvrtko and a member of the Austrian ruling family, the Habsburgs. Hungary remained the focus of Tvrtko's foreign policy, however. Although they did not recognize each other as kings, Tvrtko and Sigismund started negotiating peace in September. Sigismund was in a weaker position and likely ready to make concessions to Tvrtko when his ambassadors arrived at Tvrtko's court in January 1391. The negotiations were probably never concluded, as Tvrtko died on 10 March. He is buried in Mile alongside his uncle Stephen II.

Tvrtko I left at least one son, Tvrtko II, whose legitimacy is debated, and who was a minor and apparently not considered fit to succeed his father. Dabiša, a relative (possibly illegitimate half-brother) exiled by Tvrtko I for his part in the 1366 rebellion and reconciled with him in 1390, was elected king instead. Ostoja, the next king, may have been Tvrtko I's illegitimate son (or more likely another illegitimate half-brother).

== Assessment ==
Tvrtko I is considered one of the greatest medieval rulers of Bosnia, having "left behind a country larger, stronger, politically more influential and militarily more capable than the one he inherited." His political achievements were aided by the feudal anarchy in Serbia and Croatia, while the Ottomans were still not close enough to threaten him seriously. The Bosnian economy flourished, new settlements and trade centres appeared, and his subjects' living standards improved.

Vladimir Ćorović noted that, compared with Dušan, who had also left a considerably extended state, Tvrtko was not an overly ambitious conqueror as much as he was an able statesman. Tvrtko, he wrote, used force when necessary but otherwise took care to appear to Serbians as the legitimate heir rather than as a foreign subjugator and to the Croatians as the preferable ruler. Emphasizing his patience and diplomacy, Ćorović calls Tvrtko a man capable of making the most out of his opportunities.

== Family tree ==
Simplified family tree illustrating Tvrtko's connections to the royals and nobles of Bosnia and its neighbors

Uroš I of Serbia
Uroš II Milutin of Serbia	Dragutin of Serbia
Uroš III of Serbia	Elizabeth of Serbia	Stephen I of Bosnia	George II of Bribir
Uroš IV Dušan of Serbia	Stephen II of Bosnia	Vladislaus of Bosnia	Jelena of Bribir	Mladen III of Bribir
Uroš V of Serbia	Elizabeth of Bosnia	Louis I of Hungary	Tvrtko I of Bosnia	Vuk of Bosnia
Sigismund of Luxembourg	Mary of Hungary

== Gallery ==
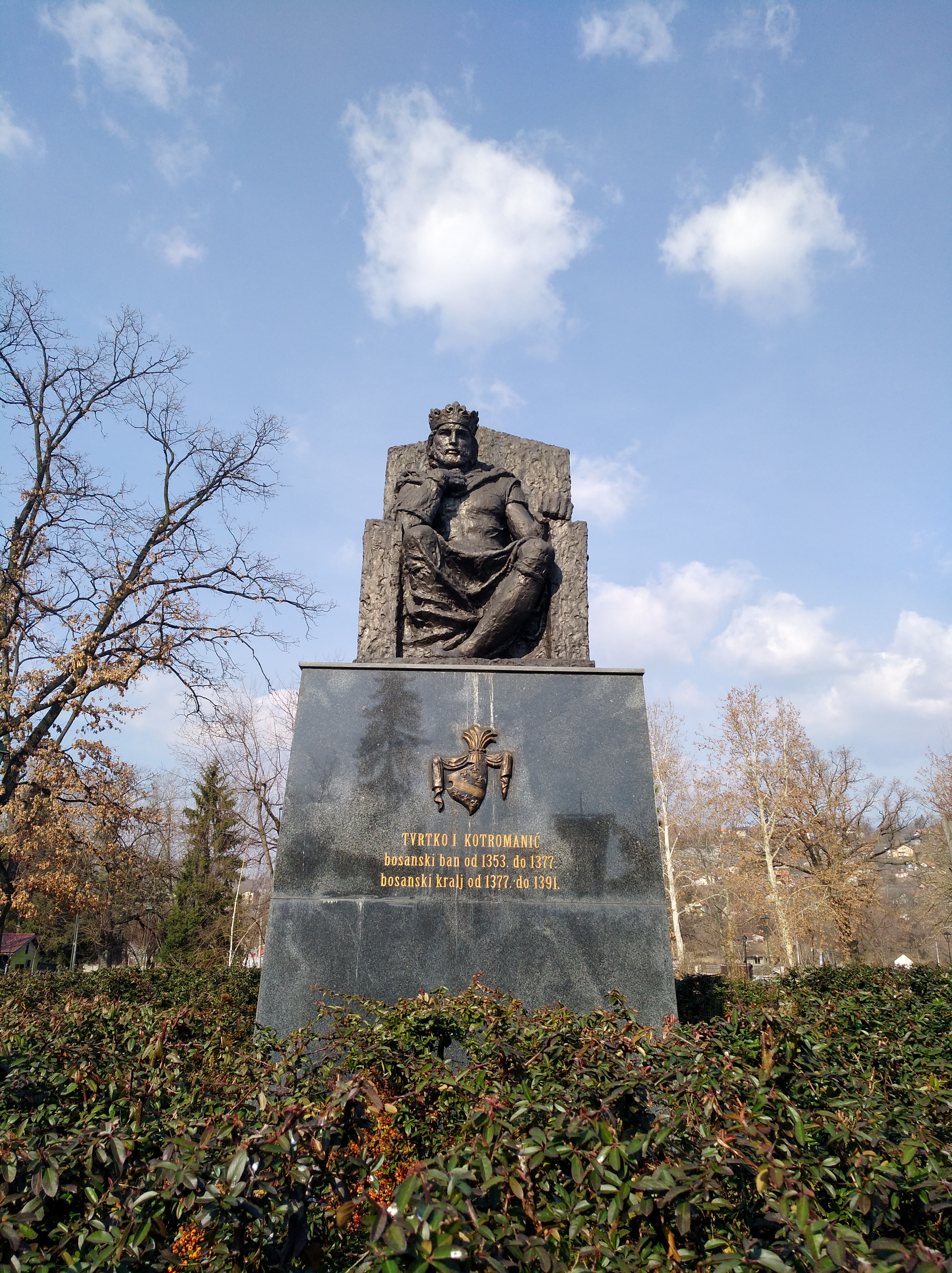
Monument at Central Park of Tuzla, Bosnia and Herzegovina, 2012.

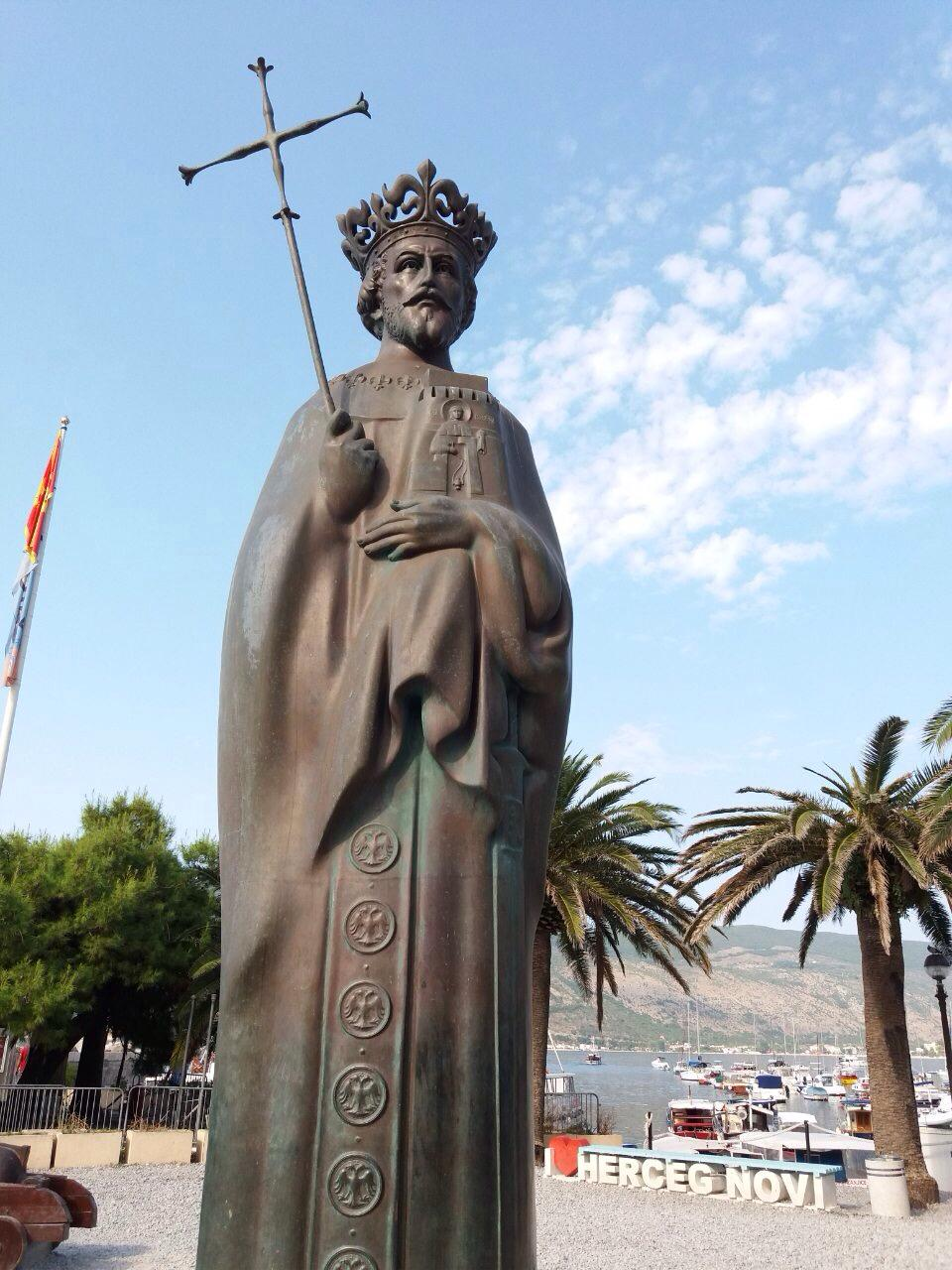
Monument at Herceg Novi, Montenegro, 2013.

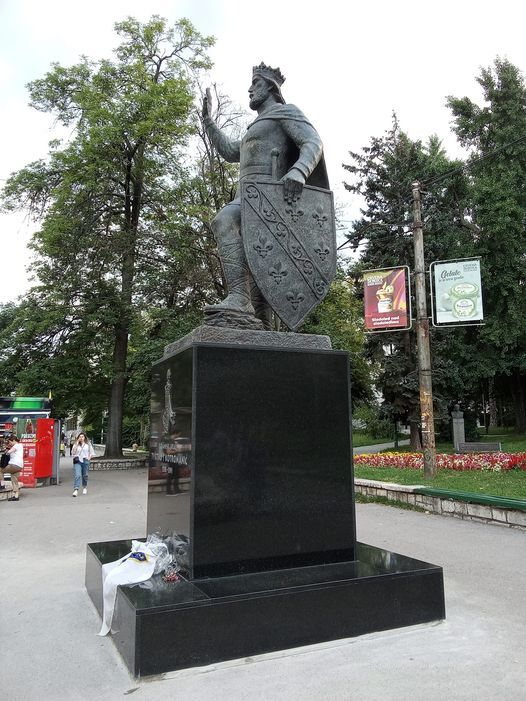
Monument at Sarajevo, Bosnia and Herzegovina, 2023.

== Bibliography ==
- Anđelić, Pavao (1980). Anđelić, Pavao, Krunidbena i grobna crkva bosanskih vladara u Milima (Arnautovićima) kod Visokog" 183–247 (in Serbo-Croatian). Glasnik Zemaljskog muzeja XXXIV/1979., Zemaljski muzej Bosne i Hercegovine, Sarajevo.
- Ćirković, Sima (1964). Историја средњовековне босанске државе (in Serbo-Croatian). Srpska književna zadruga.
- Ćirković, Sima (1964a). "Зборник радова Филозофског факултета". Сугуби венац: прилог историји краљевства у Босни (in Serbo-Croatian). University of Belgrade Faculty of Philosophy.
- Ćorović, Vladimir (2001). Istorija srpskog naroda. Janus.
- Ćošković, Pejo (2009), Kotromanići (in Serbo-Croatian), Miroslav Krleža Institute of Lexicography
- Fine, John Van Antwerp Jr. (1994). The Late Medieval Balkans: A Critical Survey from the Late Twelfth Century to the Ottoman Conquest. Michigan: University of Michigan Press. ISBN 0-472-08260-4.
- Fine, John Van Antwerp Jr. (2007). The Bosnian Church: Its Place in State and Society from the Thirteenth to the Fifteenth Century. Saqi. ISBN 978-0-86356-503-8.
- Jireček, Konstantin (1891). Istorija Srba (in Serbian).
- Lovrenović, Dubravko (1996). "Bosanski mitovi" [Bosnian Myths] (pdf). Erasmus – časopis za kulturu demokracije (in Bosnian) (18). Erasmus Gilda: 26–37.
- Lovrenović, Dubravko (1999). "Proglašenje Bosne Kraljevstvom 1377" [The proclamation of Bosnia as the kingdom in 1377] (pdf). Forum Bosnae (in Bosnian) (3–04). Međunarodni forum Bosna: 227–287.
- Malcom, Noel (1996). Bosnia: A Short History. NYU Press.
- Zadro, Dejan (2004). Franjevačka crkva i samostan sv. Nikole u srednjovjekovnim Milima (Arnautovići kod Visokog) (in Serbo-Croatian). Filozofski fakultet u Sarajevu.

Regnal titles
Preceded by Stephen II	Ban of Bosnia; 1353–1366	Succeeded by Vuk
Preceded by Vuk	Ban of Bosnia; 1367–1377	Became king
New title	King of Bosnia; 1377–1391	Succeeded by Dabiša
Vacant Title last held by Uroš V	— TITULAR — King of Serbia; 1377–1391	Succeeded by Dabiša
Conquest	— DISPUTED — King of Croatia and Dalmatia; 1390–1391; Disputed by Mary and Sigismund	Succeeded by Dabiša
