= Mladen III Šubić =

- Duke of Klis, Skradin and Omiš
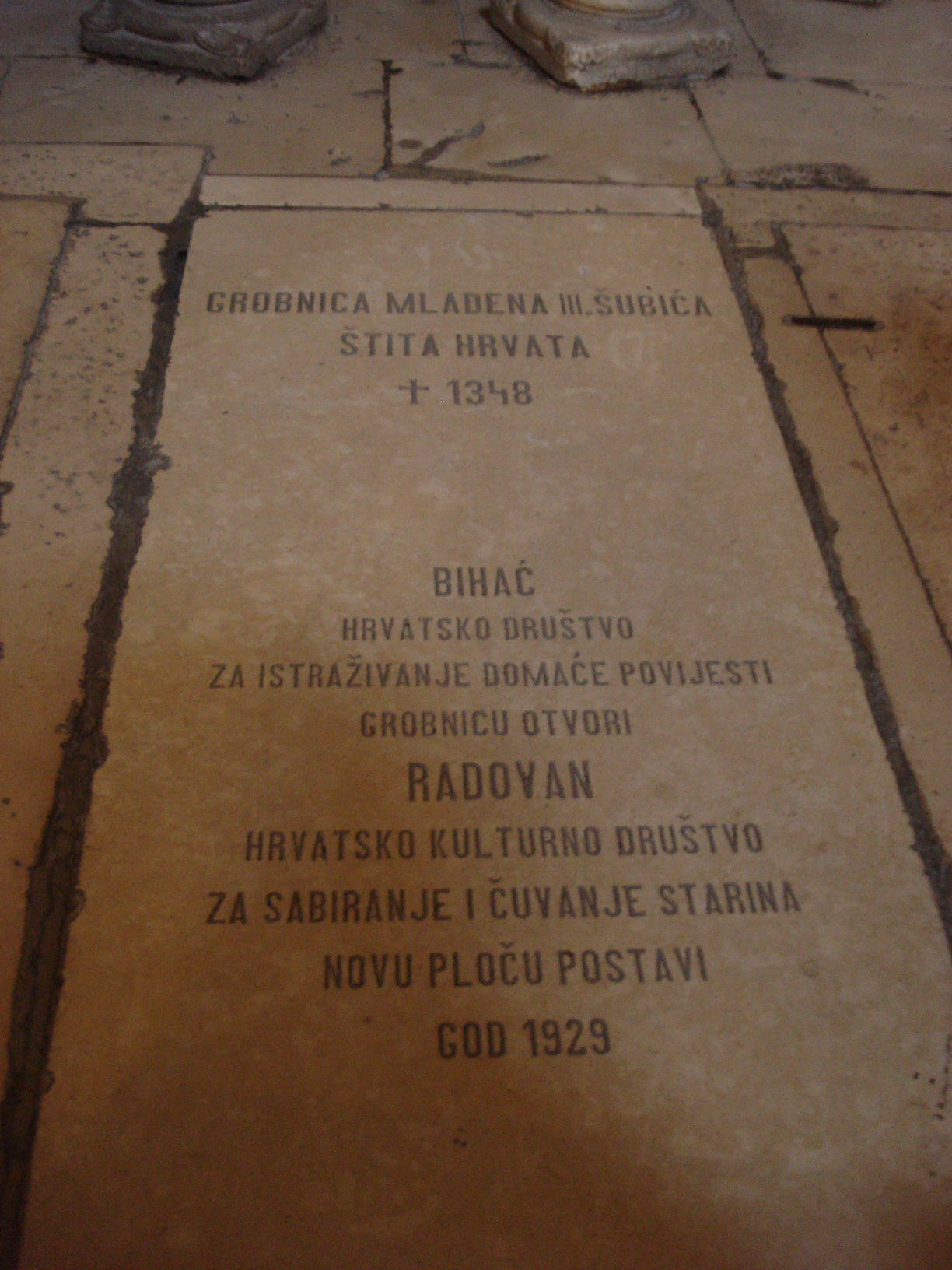
- Replacement gravestone from 1929 in the Trogir Cathedral.
- Predecessor: Mladen II Šubić of Bribir
- Successor: Jelena Šubić
- Reign: 1328–1348
- Born: c. 1315; Dalmatia (modern Croatia)
- Died: 1 May 1348; Trogir
- Burial: Trogir Cathedral
- Spouse: Jelena Nemanjić Šubić
- House: Šubić
- Father: George II Šubić of Bribir
- Mother: Lelka

Mladen III Šubić (Croatian: Mladen III. Šubić) (c. 1315 – Trogir, 1 May 1348) was a member of the Croatian Šubić noble family, who ruled from Klis Fortress. He was in possession of Klis, Omiš and Skradin. He is also known as Shield of the Croats (Clipeus Croatorum), according to the Latin epitaph in verse on his grave in Trogir Cathedral.

== Ruler ==
He formally succeeded his father Juraj II Šubić upon his early death, though the territories were initially controlled by his mother Lelka until he reached adulthood in 1332. She continued to have considerable influence on his politics afterwards. He successfully warred against the coalition of Dalmatian cities Split, Trogir and Šibenik under Republic of Venice and the nobility under Duke of Knin, Ivan Nelipić, whom he pressured to return Ostrovica in 1335. He also strengthened his position by ousting opposition of Ivan Jurišić, Budislav Ugrinić and Hran Gradinić within his clan either through military or diplomatic means. He later also allowed his uncle Paul II to secede as the Prince of Ostrovica.

He was the famous Šubić from Klis, but regardless of the diplomatic and dynastic success, Mladen III could not save Šubić family from its eventual fall, because he was almost only one left to defend it, and following the death of Ivan Nelipić, became the principal opposition to the Hungarian king in 1344.

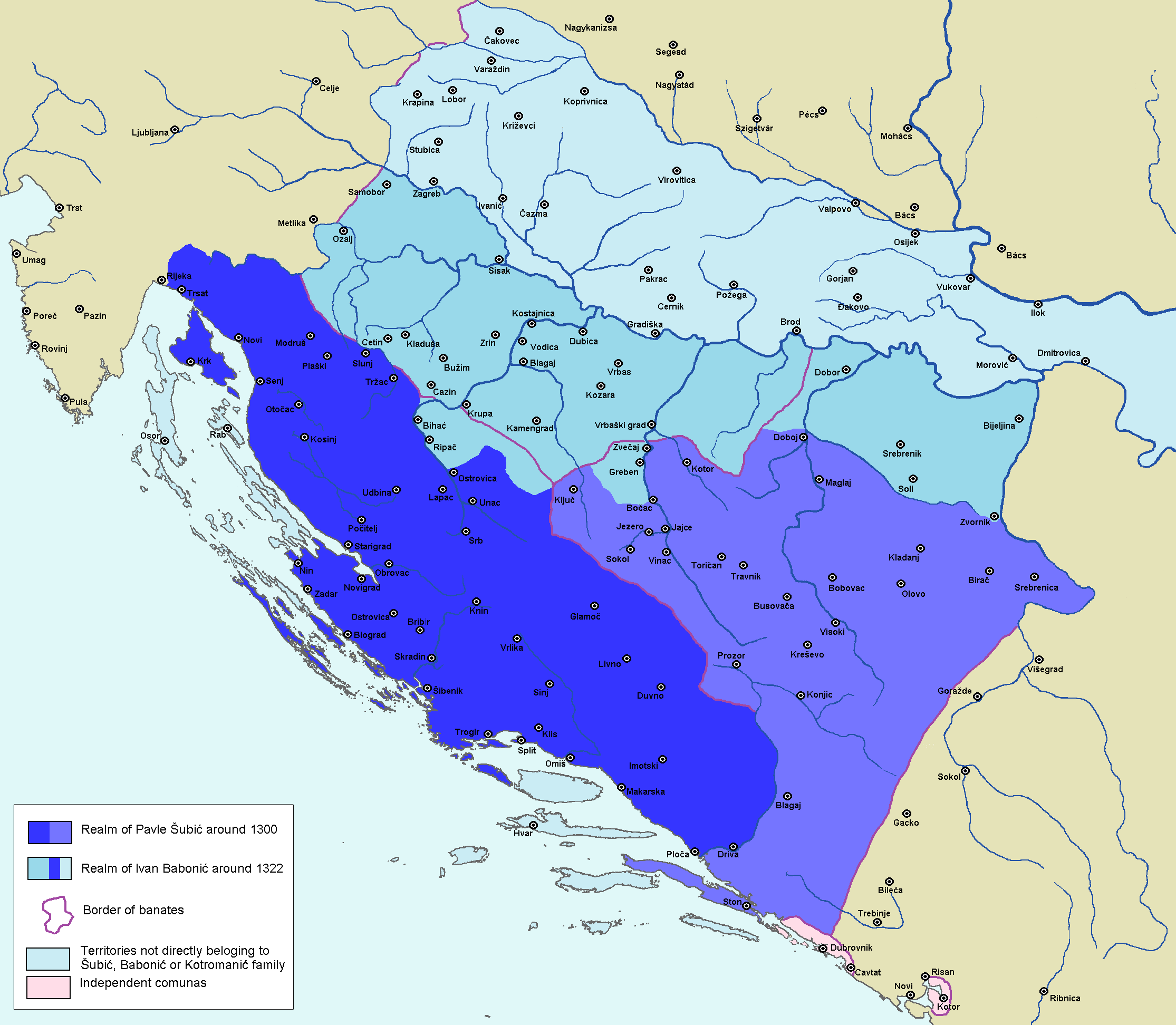
Map of Croatian lands in the first half of the 14th-century

To oppose the Hungarian king he made various alliances. First he warred and eventually made an alliance with Stephen II, Ban of Bosnia in 1338, confirmed by marrying his sister Jelena Šubić (died c. 1378) to Regent of Bosnia Vladislav Kotromanić, and Jelena gave birth to the first Bosnian king, Tvrtko I. He neutrally allied with the Republic of Venice during Siege of Zadar (1345–1346), marrying younger brother Paul III to a Venetian noblewoman, and took the title of Marquess of Slavonia (meaning "Croatia") in 1348, with the intention of overthrowing royal power of Louis I of Hungary over rest of Croatia. He also married in 1347 Jelena Nemanjić, half-sister of the Serbian emperor Stefan Dušan who had bad relations with Hungary.

However, the anti-Hungarian plans suddenly stopped as Mladen III died on 1 May 1348, from the Black Death. He was buried in the Cathedral of St. Lawrence in Trogir.

=== The aftermath ===
After Mladen's death, a great political and military struggle for control over Klis Fortress arose.

- Catherine Dandolo the wife of his brother Pavao III Šubić and relative of doge Andrea Dandolo wanted the fortress for Venetians.
- Jelena Nemanjić Šubić (his wife-widow) wanted the fortress for her half-brother Stefan Dušan of Serbia.
- Jelena Šubić (his sister) wanted the fortress for her son Tvrtko I of Bosnia.

After several diplomatic games and battles between the armies, Klis and other cities by 1355 temporary fell again into hands of king Louis I of Hungary. Previously, with the death of Paul II Šubić and 1347 arrangement of Gregory II in the name Paul II's son George III with the king, Šubić family also lost secondary stronghold Ostrovica in exchange for Zrin Castle, by which name the prominent Zrinski family branch will become known.

== Family ==
Mladen III Šubić was probably oldest son of Juraj II Šubić and grandson of Pavao I Šubić Bribirski, who was the most powerful Croatian noble at the end of the thirteenth century and beginning of the fourteenth century.

Mladen III Šubić had a son Mladen IV Šubić.

== Grave epitaph ==
Latin (Inscriptio sepulcri comitis Mladini)

Heu gemma splendida jacet sub hac petra.
Cuius valor periit nunc in fossa tetra.
Mladinus magnificus qui Clissie fuit
Comes, suis sola spes cur tam cito ruit?
Georgii comitis memorie bone
Natus atque dominus Almesi, Scardone,
Probitatis titulus, morum et honoris
Ut flos vernans defuit vir tanti valoris.
Croatorum clipeus fortis et ipse erat
Inter omnes fortior; volens scire querat:
Eius mortem impiam cerno pro peccatis
Slavonie gentium evenisse gratis.
Flete, Slavi, nobilem nepotem banorum,
Largam vestram copiam pacis et honorum.
Sic preces altissimo date creatori,
Quod ipse misericors parcat peccatori.
Hic annorum Domini sub cursu milleni
Trecenteni insuper atque quadrageni
Octavo sub tempore traditus est limo
In Calendis Madii mensis die primo.
Cum bona sui memoria mors ipsum voravit,
Deo reddens animam hic mox expiravit.

Croatian translation (Natpis na grobu kneza Mladena)

Jao! Alem sjajni ispod ove ploče crne
Leži sad i usred tmine hrabrenost mu trne.
Svijetli Mladen, knez i slavni vladar Klisa grada.
Zašto mlad preminu, jedina svom puku nada?
Sin knez-Jurja, uspomene dobre vlastelina.
Bješe on gospodar Omiš-grada i Skradina.
Čestitosti i značaja uzora nam nesta,
Vrli junak, cvijet proljetni, živjeti nam presta.
Štit Hrvata on nam bješe, vrijedan nada svima,
Plemenit i silan, prvi branič med prvima.
Pitaš li me zašto smrt ga nevina zadesi?
Ja sad vidim: Slavskog roda ubiše ga grijesi!
Plačite, Slaveni, svijetlog unuka banova,
Zalog naših časti, zalog mira, blagoslova!
A sad vaše Previšnjemu diž'te molbe vruće,
Nek daruje grešnom svjetlost milosti moguće.
Tisuć trista četrdeset osmog ljeta
Gospodina našeg sa ovoga pođe svijeta,
U prvi dan svibnja tijelo ovdje zemlji dade,
Grob nam ga proguta i ugrabi naše nade,
Ovdje Bogu dušu dade, al' mu spomen draga
Među nama ostade, na sve vijeke blaga.

== See also ==
- Šubić family
- Klis Fortress
