= George II Šubić of Bribir =

George II Šubić of Bribir Juraj II. Šubić Bribirski
- Duke of the Dalmatian cities Duke of Trogir, Nin, Omiš; Duke of Tropolje; Duke of Split
- Born: c. 1275–1290
- Died: 15 December 1328
- Noble family: Šubići
- Issue: Paul III Šubić of Bribir; Katarina Šubić; Mladen III Šubić; Jelena Šubić; Božidar Šubić
- Father: Paul I Šubić of Bribir
- Mother: Ursa

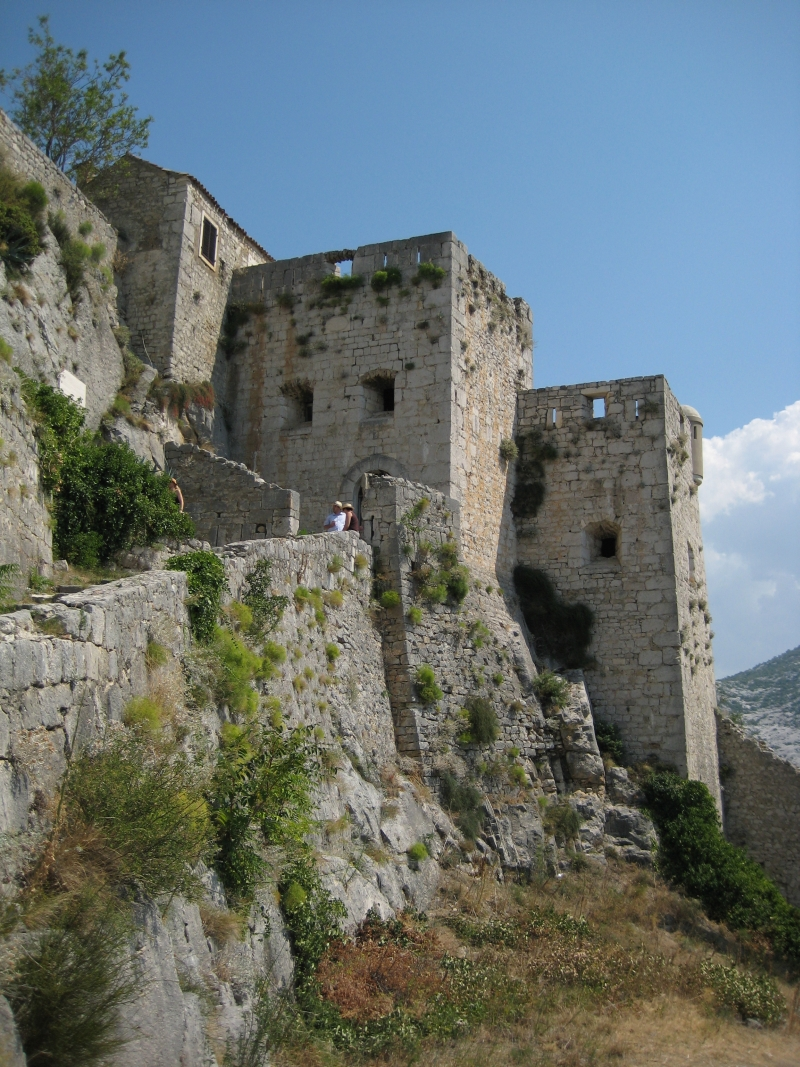
Juraj II Šubić ruled from the Klis Fortress

George II Šubić of Bribir (Croatian: Juraj II Šubić Bribirski; c. 1275 – Klis, 15 December 1328) was a Croatian nobleman, a member of the Šubić noble family, who ruled from the Klis Fortress.

== Early life ==
George II Šubić was son of Paul I Šubić of Bribir, who was the most powerful Croatian nobleman at the end of the 13th century and beginning of the 14th century. After the capture of his brother Mladen II Šubić, George II became the head of the Šubić family with support of his two remaining brothers: Gregory I Šubić and Paul II Šubić.

== Career ==
When George I died in 1303, his nephew George II succeeded him as ruler in Dalmatia. When Paul I died in May 1312, Mladen II succeeded as Ban of Croatia and Dalmatia, and he shared out his cities to his brothers: Gregory received Šibenik and Bribir, while George II received Omiš, Nin and Klis.

George II tried to retake the land and influence that his brother, Mladen II Šubić, had lost in the last war over Bosnia. But he didn't claim Bosnia, instead, he pursued the conquest of lands in Croatia, which had been taken from Šubić's by Prince Nelipac. Stjepan II Kotromanić again changed allegiances and started to fight again for the Šubićs. In the summer of 1324 Prince Nelipac and George II clashed near the waterfalls of Krka. Stjepan II gave considerable support to the Šubićs, but he did not dare involve himself into the fight. Šubić's party was defeated near Knin, and George II himself was captured by Prince Nelipac some time after the battle. Stjepan had attempted to liberate George II from imprisonment, but all attempts had failed. He died in 1328.

== Issue ==
Juraj II Šubić had five children:

- Paul III (d. 1356), married Venetian noblewoman Catherine Dandolo
- Katarina, married count Ivan Jurišić
- Božidar or "Deodat" (d. 1348), count of Bribir 1345–47
- Mladen III (d. 1348), ruled Klis in 1330–48, married Serbian princess Jelena Nemanjić
- Jelena (ca. 1306–1378) who married Regent of Bosnia Vladislav Kotromanić in Klis, and gave birth to the first Bosnian King Tvrtko I.
