= Elizabeth of Kuyavia =

Baness of Bosnia
- Tenure: 1323–1345
- Born: 1315/1320
- Died: c. 22 August 1345 (aged 24–30)
- Spouse: Stephen II, Ban of Bosnia
- Issue: Elizabeth, Queen of Hungary and Poland; Catherine, Countess of Cilli?
- House: House of Piast
- Father: Kazimierz III of Gniewkowo

Elizabeth of Kuyavia (Polish: Elżbieta, Serbo-Croatian: Elizabeta/Елизабета; 1315/1320 – after 22 August 1345) was a Polish noblewoman of the House of Piast. She was the only daughter of Duke Kazimierz III of Gniewkowo and his wife, whose name and origins are unknown; her brother, Władysław the White, was later a candidate for the Polish throne.

By 1323, King Charles I of Hungary wanted to increase influence over Stephen II, Ban of Bosnia. He offered Stephan the hand of Elizabeth, the relative of his own Piast wife Elizabeth. By marrying Elizabeth of Kuyavia, Stephen received from Charles the lands to the west formerly held by Mladen I Šubić of Bribir and Usora and Soli in the north formerly held by Vladislav, King of Syrmia. The marriage was celebrated by 1339. Up to 1339, Stephan was married to an unknown Bulgarian princess.

The only child which can be attributed to Elizabeth of Kuyavia without doubt is Elizabeth of Bosnia, born c. 1340. Some believe that Catherine of Bosnia, Countess of Cilli, was daughter of Elizabeth of Kuyavia and Stephen II, while others argue that Catherine was daughter of Stephen II's brother Vladislaus and his wife Jelena Šubić. Elizabeth may have also had a son, Vuk who may have survived infancy but he did not outlive his father so never became Ban of Bosnia. Vuk may have been the son of one of Stephen's previous two wives.

Stephen outlived Elizabeth. It is unknown what Elizabeth died of. Judging by the time, it is possible that she died of Black Death, which was sweeping across Europe during the 14th century. Banness Elizabeth was buried in Bobovac in a tomb which she shared with her husband, brother-in-law Vladislaus and sister-in-law Jelena. After Elizabeth of Kuyavia's death, her daughter Elizabeth was fostered by the Hungarian queen dowager Elizabeth and this soon led to Elizabeth's marriage to Louis I of Hungary.
