= Kotroman =

Kotroman may refer to:

- Kotroman, unknown medieval Bosnian nobleman who was the eponym of the Kotromanić dynasty
- Stephen I Kotroman (1242–1314), medieval Bosnian ban
- Kotroman (Užice), a village in Serbia
