= Vuk, Ban of Bosnia =

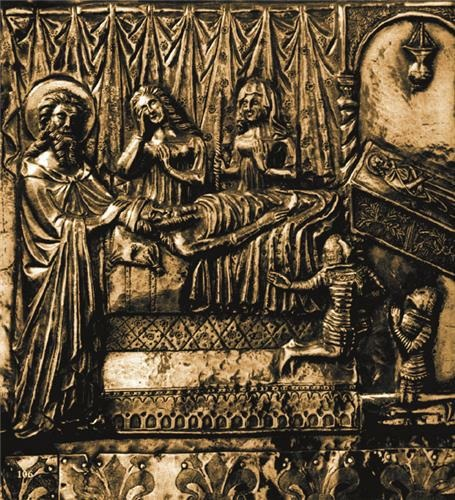
Vuk with his brother, mother and cousin Elizabeth at the deathbed of his uncle Stephen, as depicted on Chest of Saint Simeon, dated 1380. According to another interpretation, both boy figures represent Tvrtko.

Vuk (died after 1378) was the Ban of Bosnia from 1366 until 1367, a member of the Kotromanić dynasty that ruled the Banate of Bosnia since the turn of the 14th century.

Vuk was the younger son of Vladislav Kotromanić and Jelena Šubić, who were married in 1337. His brother, Tvrtko I, became Ban of Bosnia following the death of their paternal uncle, Stephen II, in 1353. Their father acted as regent until his death in 1354, followed by their mother taking over the role of regent until Tvrtko reached the age of majority in 1357. Vuk accompanied Jelena when she traveled to Hungary in 1354 to request consent to Tvrtko's accession from their overlord, King Louis I of Hungary. In July 1357, Tvrtko and Vuk were confirmed as joint rulers of Bosnia and Usora by King Louis under two conditions: one of the brothers would be at Louis's court whenever the other is in Bosnia, and they would make an effort to suppress the "heretical" Bosnian Church.

In February 1366, Tvrtko faced a major revolt by his discontent vassals. He and Jelena were forced to flee to King Louis's court, while Vuk replaced him on the ban's throne. While he did take his role as ban seriously, it is not clear if Vuk instigated his brother's dethronement or if he was only a puppet installed by the nobility. Within a month, however, Tvrtko returned aided by the Hungarian army. By the end of March, Vuk had lost some of Bosnia to his brother, but retained control over Bobovac, the capital. The nobleman Sanko Miltenović defected from Vuk to Tvrtko in the second half of 1367, bringing much of Zachlumia back under Tvrtko's control. Vuk was finally deposed and exiled in late 1367.

Once exiled, Vuk attempted to gain outside help against Tvrtko; he particularly pleaded with Pope Urban V, as the Papacy had been advocating a crusade against the Bosnian Church for some time. The King of Hungary's protection of Tvrtko rendered Vuk's chances of regaining the throne of Bosnia slim. By 1374, the brothers had reconciled, possibly on the occasion of Tvrtko's marriage to Dorothea of Bulgaria. Vuk remained in Bosnia, functioning as a junior ban and endorsing his brother's charters. He is believed to have died after 1378.

== Sources ==
- Ćirković, Sima (1964). Istorija srednjovekovne bosanske države (in Serbian). Srpska književna zadruga.
- Ćošković, Pejo (2009), Kotromanići (in Croatian), Miroslav Krleža Institute of Lexicography
- Fine, John Van Antwerp Jr. (1994). The Late Medieval Balkans: A Critical Survey from the Late Twelfth Century to the Ottoman Conquest. Michigan: University of Michigan Press. ISBN 0-472-08260-4.

Regnal titles
Preceded by Tvrtko I	Ban of Bosnia; 1366–1367	Succeeded by Tvrtko I
