= Jelena Nemanjić Šubić =

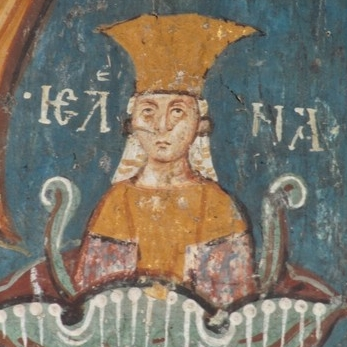
- Jelena, fresco at Visoki Dečani
- Title: Countess of Klis, Omiš and Skradin
- Spouse: Mladen III Šubić
- Parent(s): King Stefan Uroš III Dečanski of Serbia (father); Maria Palaiologina (mother)

Jelena Šubić (Serbian Cyrillic: Јелена Шубић; Jelena Nemanjić Šubić (Јелена Немањић Шубић)) was the daughter of Stefan Uroš III Dečanski of Serbia and the half-sister of Stefan Dušan. She was married to the Croatian magnate Mladen III Šubić, Prince of Bribir from the noble Šubić family. They ruled from Klis Fortress in Dalmatia. After Mladen III Šubić's death, she ruled as his widow over Skradin and Klis.

After the death of Prince Mladen III (1348), the Dalmatian cities of Klis and Skradin were ruled by Jelena, in the name of their son Mladen IV. She had many opponents, beginning from 1351. Firstly, from the wife of Paul III, Catherine Dandolo from Venice, then Jelena Šubić, the mother of Ban Tvrtko I of Bosnia. The mother of Tvrtko was openly supported by King Louis I of Hungary, although Louis I in reality wanted these cities for himself.

In 1355, the Republic of Venice sent an offer to buy the cities from her, but as she refused, and was unable to defend the cities from the many pretenders, she asked her brother Emperor Stefan Dušan for aid. Dušan sent Palman to Klis and Đuraš Ilijić to Skradin. The cities were subsequently given up, after the inhabitants showed unreadiness and some non-decisive fighting, with Đuraš ceding Skradin to Venice after the death of Dušan (December 20, 1355). Dušan had sought a flotilla from Venice for his planned campaign on Constantinople, and had ordered Đuraš to cede Skradin if it could not be defended from the Hungarians. Klis was subsequently ceded to the Hungarians by Palman without conflict. Palman took Jelena with him, but her son Mladen IV stayed behind as a political hostage.

== See also ==
- Šubić
- Nemanjić family tree

== Sources ==
- Fajfrić, Željko (2000) [1998], Sveta loza Stefana Nemanje (in Serbian) (Internet ed.), Belgrade: Janus; Rastko.
