= Stephen II, Ban of Bosnia =

Stephen II
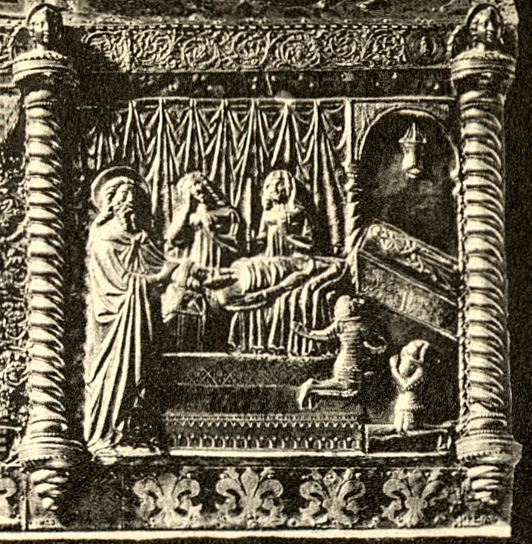
- Detail of the scene The Death of Ban Kotromanić depicted on the Chest of Saint Simeon.

Ban of Bosnia
- Reign: 1322–1353
- Predecessor: Stephen I
- Successor: Tvrtko I
- Born: 14th century Bosnia
- Died: September 1353; Bosnia
- Burial: Mile, near Visoko
- Spouse: Elizabeth of Ortenburg a Bulgarian princess Elizabeth of Kuyavia
- Issue: Elizabeth, Queen of Hungary; Catherine, Countess of Cilli? Maria of Bosnia?
- House: Kotromanić
- Father: Stephen I, Ban of Bosnia
- Mother: Elizabeth of Serbia
- Religion: Eastern Orthodox, from 1347 Roman Catholic

Stephen II (Serbo-Croatian: Стефан II / Stjepan II; 14th century – September 1353) was the Bosnian Ban from 1314, but in reality from 1322 to 1353 together with his brother, Vladislav Kotromanić in 1326–1353. He was the son of Bosnian Ban Stephen I Kotromanić and Elizabeth, sister of King Stefan Vladislav II. Throughout his reign in the fourteenth century, Stephen ruled the lands from Sava to the Adriatic and from Cetina to Drina. He was a member of the Kotromanić dynasty. He was buried in his Franciscan church in Mile, near Visoko, Bosnia.

== Early life ==
When his father died in 1314 and Croatian Ban Mladen II Šubić emerged as Count of Zadar, Princeps of Dalmatia and Second Bosnian Ban, Stephen's mother Elizabeth took him and his siblings and fled with them into exile to the Republic of Dubrovnik. Mladen was not popular in Bosnia and had fought bloody but losing wars against the Serbian Kingdom (under Stephen Uroš II Milutin), and the Venetians (to whom he lost Zadar in 1313), along with numerous internal opponents of his regime. Mladen came to the idea to impose Stephen Kotromanić as his vassal in Bosnia, for he was sure that he would be well accepted in Bosnia. The Šubić, vengeful enemies of the House of Kotromanić now became their protectors. Mladen decided to keep Stephen II under his firm grip and to use him to eradicate the Bosnian Church, so he arranged a marriage between Stephen and a Princess from the family of the Count Meinhard of Ortenburg that ruled in Carniola. The Pope was against the marriage since both families were related, but it would give Stephen certain advantages, so he convinced the Pope to allow it.

== Reign ==
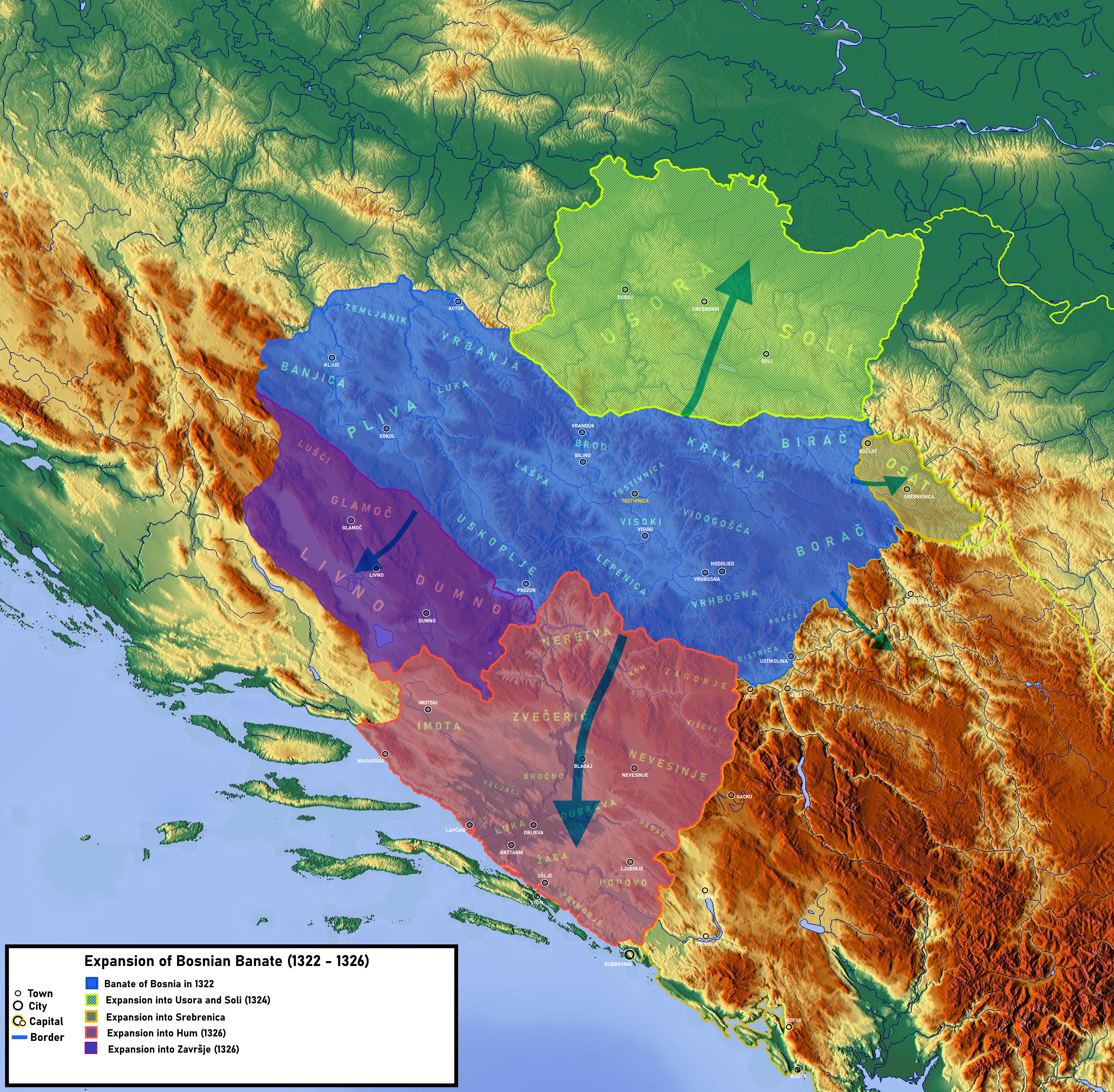
Expansion of Bosnian Banate under Stephen II

=== Ascent ===
Ban of Croatia, Mladen II, member of the Šubić noble family, became Ban of Bosnia in 1305, following his uncle, who was appointed Ban of Bosnia by his brother Paul I and was killed in fighting "Bosnian heretics" in 1304. Paul I referred to himself as Lord of all of Bosnia in a charter from 1305, but it is doubtful that he held all Bosnia at any time.

Until 1319 Mladen's II army had already entirely retreated from Bosnia, as he had found himself stuck in numerous troubles and conflicts with revolting cities in Dalmatia. This disorder greatly helped Stephen II as he gained influence and the chance to rule on his own and build up his realm opened up, all the while his supreme liege, the Hungarian king Charles I Robert, had plans which required Ban's help. Charles I went on a campaign to eradicate the Croatian magnates in order to become the sole ruler of the realm. He isolated Matthew III Csák and destroyed the Kőszegi family. The time had come for the Šubićs. Near the end of 1321, he ordered Stephen II to act from Bosnia supported by Ban John Babonić from Slavonia, encircling and isolating Croatia. Stephen II now fell under King Charles Robert's direct command. Due to the fact that he wanted to get revenge and get rid of the Šubićs, this was useful to him for the time being, since he could then rule Bosnia uninterrupted without incursions from Dalmatia, and practically entirely by himself as Charles I would be too far away to watch his every move. Besides that, he also got a chance to expand his influence in Croatia. The decisive battle happened near Mladen's capital Skradin in 1322, where he was defeated decisively. Mladen II fell back to Klis Fortress and waited for Charles I to come, blindly believing that he would somehow retain his power because of Šubić's loyal service during King's ascension to tron. However, Charles I came to Knin and invited Mladen to meet him there where he was immediately arrested and sent to a dungeon in Hungary where he died.

=== Early reign and other marriages ===
Immediately after the death of Serbian King Stefan Uroš II Milutin in 1321, he had no problem in acquiring his lands of Usora and Soli, which he fully incorporated in 1324. He helped his uncle Vladislav of Syrmia to regain all Serbia, but after the fall of Ostrvica at Rudnik at the hands of Stefan Dečanski, there was no more point in supporting him during the struggles for the Serbian throne, so he took Usora and Soli for himself. The hostility caused by this between Bosnia and Serbia would lead to Stephen II Kotromanić's war against Dečanski several years later.

When his uncle Vladislav died, he gained some parts of his realm of Syrmia. After this, Stephen II spent the first years of his reign in relative peace. He gave numerous privileges to the local nobility to increase popularity. One of the most famous was the edict in which he gave some župe) to Prince Vukoslav. In the edicts he refers to his brother Vladislav with the title Prince of Bosnia sharing equal rule with him since 1326, although Stephen had, being Ban, the real rule.

In 1323 Hungarian King Charles Robert wanted to increase influence over Ban Stephen II Kotromanić. He offered Stephen the hand of his wife's distant relative, Elizabeth of Kuyavia, daughter of Duke Kazimierz III of Gniewków and received from the King as a gift with the marriage the lands to the west formerly held by Mladen I Šubić Bribirski and Usora and Soli in the north formerly held by Stephen Dragutin and his son, Vladislav II of the Nemanjić. The marriage was legalized by 1339. Up to 1339 Stephen was still married to the daughter of the Bulgarian tsar and had been previously married to a countess of Ortenburg.

=== Conflicts in Dalmatia ===
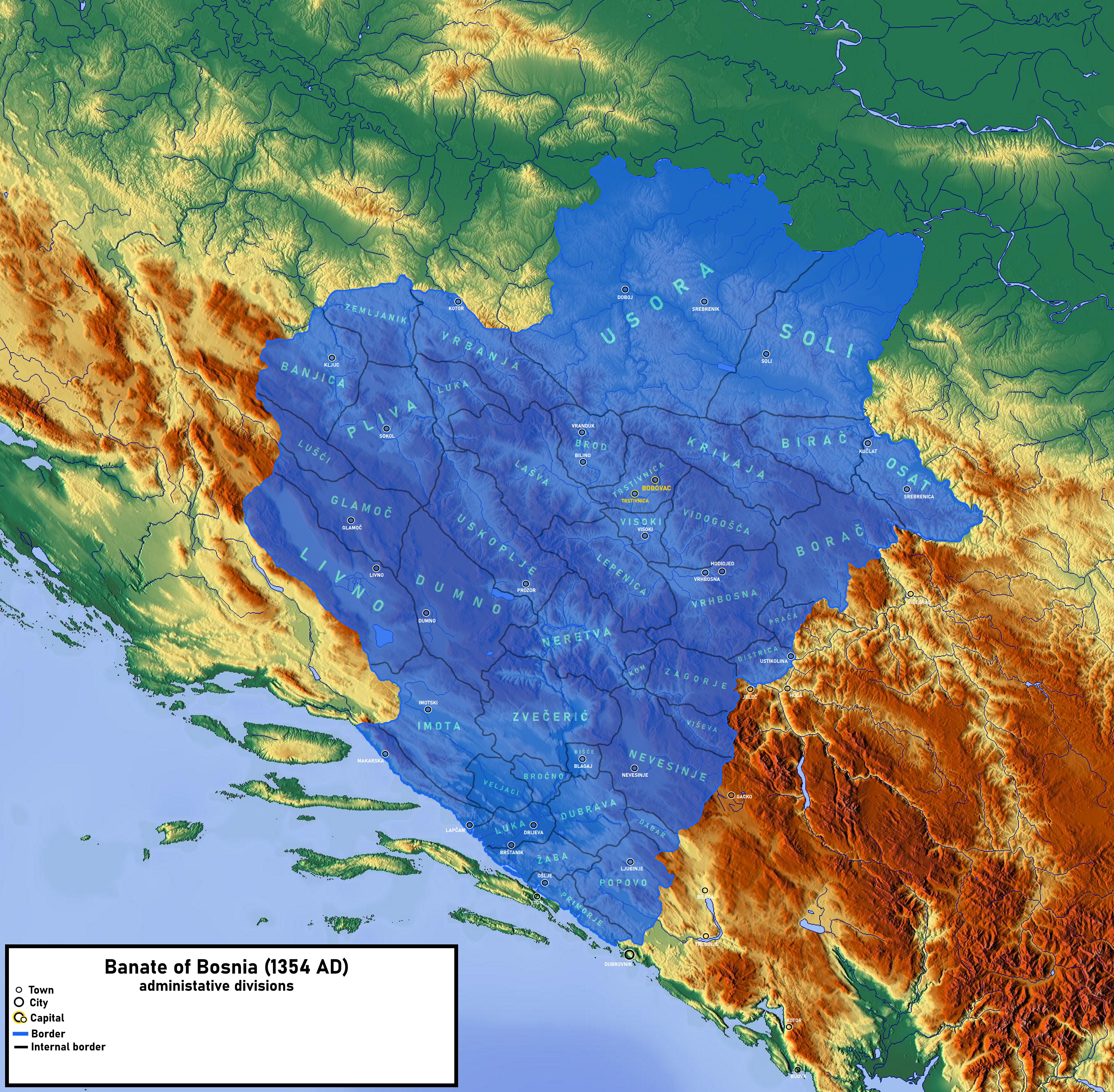
Bosnian Banate under Stephen II. managed to obtain full access to Via Narenta after the annexation of Zachlumia.

The Hungarian king Charles I Robert had asked Stephen II again, around 1323, to join the new Ban of Slavonia Nicholas Felsőlendvai and launch a joint offensive against Nelipić in Croatia. Nikola's expedition eventually failed, but it did rise up Juraj II Šubić (brother of Mladen II Šubić) against Nelipić, and, eventually, Bosnian Ban Stephen II himself. The movement wanted to return the Šubić to power in Croatia with Juraj II on the throne. When an all-out war broke out between the armies of Prince Ivan Nelipić and Juraj II Šubić in the Summer of 1324, Ban Stephen II contributed considerable support to the Šubićs, without involving his forces into clashes. It turn out to be good move, because the Šubić's party was massacred near Knin and Juraj II Šubić himself was captured by Prince Nelipac. Stephen II had attempted to liberate Juraj II from imprisonment, but without success.

Ivan Nelipić immediately pushed the fight against Ban Stephen II, and managed to capture city of Visuća, but Stephen's shrewd politics and willingness to bestow his nobility with privileges had paid off, as Vuk of Vukoslavić family had helped him to retake the city. Although Stephen's military ambitions were only relatively successful he continued to wage war against the enemies of the Šubić. His target was the city of Trogir which was one of the major supporters of Nelipić's campaigning. Stephen adopted a harsh tactic. His forces raided Caravans from Trogir, which eventually forced its denizens to humbly sign a peace and addressed him as the high and mighty lord Stephen free ruler and master of Bosnia, Usora and Soli and many other places and Prince of the Hum. It is because of this that Stephen started a conflict with the Republic of Ragusa regarding trade. Stephen was shown as a very tough negotiator and the negotiations finally ended in 1326.

After seeing that Ban Nicholas Felsőlendvai was unable to weaken the position of Nelipić, Hungarian King Charles I deposed him. The new man for the job was one of his most trusted men, Ban Mikac Mihaljević. Ban Mikac advanced toward Croatia in the summer of 1325. Bosnian Ban Stephen II sent several squadrons to assist him in his offensive. In 1326, after taking Babonić family cities Mikac advanced deeper into Croatia, where he meet Stephen's reinforcements. The expedition eventually had little success, so Mikac sent a portion of his army to Bihać which would serve as defence against Nelipić's possible counterattacks and retreated to Hungary.

Ban Stephen II gained territories, expending his realm to the coast by annexing space between mouths of the Cetina and the Neretva rivers, and all in between Bosnia main proper and the coast, namely vast expanses of karst poljes of Livanjsko, Duvanjsko and Glamočko, which will from that point on be known as Završje (also "Western Sides", Bosnian: Zapadne Strane), until territorial reconfiguration under Ottomans. Ban also annexed towns and forts of Imotski, Livno, Duvno, Glamoč, Grahovo. In just a year from this point Stephen II will turn to Zahumlje and annex it for Bosnian realm as well.

=== Conflict with Serbia ===
By 1326 Ban Stephen II attacked Serbia in a military alliance with the Republic of Ragusa and conquered Zahumlje (or Hum), gaining more of Adriatic Sea coast, from mouth of the Neretva to Konavle, with areas significant Orthodox population under Serbian Orthodox Church and mixed Orthodox and Catholic population in coastal areas and around Ston. He also expanded into Završje, including the fields of Glamoč, Duvno and Livno.

These parts of the province of Hum, that Ban conquered and annexed for Bosnia, were ruled by the Serbian vassalage family the Branivojevićs and their overlord Crep, Stefan Dečanski's viceroy for Trebinje and coastal areas around Ston, whom Branivojević attacked and killed. The King Stefan had no desire to defend this family and their lands from Ban Stephen's forces claiming their past sins, but in reality he assessed Bosnians to strong for his forces. Bosnia controlled the coast from the border with Ragusa across Neretva to Omiš. Ban Stephen himself killed two members of the Branivojević, while Branko Branivojević fled to Serbia and sought help from King Stefan and then headed to Ragusa, from where he proceeded to Ston. Ban Stephen pursued the chase of Branko, but eventually the Ragusan forces caught the last of the four brothers from the Branivojević. The Bosnian titles included Lord of the Hum Land ever after. Ban Stephen became the ruler of all the lands from Cetina to Neretva with the exception of Omiš which was taken by the Hungarians.

In 1329, Ban Stephen II Kotromanić pushed another military attempt into Serbia, assaulting Lord Vitomir of Trebinje and Konavli, but the main portion of his force was defeated by the Young King Dušan who commanded the forces of King Stefan Dečanski at Priboj. The Ban's horse was killed in the battle, and he would have lost his life if his vassal Vuk had not given him his own horse. By doing so, Vuk sacrificed his own life, and was killed by the Serbian troops in open battle. Thus the Ban managed to add Nevesinje and Zagorje to his realm.

Although the Zahumljans mostly accepted the Ban's rule, some resisted, like Petar Toljenović who ruled the Seaside from his capital in Popovo; he was the grandson of the famous Andrija, Prince of Hum. Petar raised a rebellion, wishing either more autonomy or total independence and the eventual restoration of the conquered territories to Serbia. He lost a battle against Ban Stephen II and was imprisoned and put in irons. Stephen had him thrown with his horse off a cliff. Peter survived for a full hour after the fall.

The Ban's vassal that governed Hum started to raid Ragusa's trade routes, which worsened Bosnian-Ragusan relations that were very high during the conquest of Hum. To make matters worse, he (Ban's vassal) asked Ragusa to pay him the old traditional mogorish tax that it traditionally paid to the Hum and Serbian rulers and even asked it to recognize his supreme rule. The Republic of Ragusa refused outright.

=== Religious tensions in Bosnia ===
The Pope was enraged by the religious tensions that grew in Bosnia, installed Fabian of the Franciscan Order as the Inquisitor in Slavonia and gave him the task of rooting out heresy in Bosnia. The Pope requested Stephen II's full assistance. In 1327 the Dominicans and Franciscans argued over who would be granted the task of burning the heretics. Although Fabian eventually took over the leadership over the movement, he utterly failed. Then the Pope wrote to the Hungarian King for a military intervention in Bosnia.

In 1333, Stephen agreed with Stefan Dušan of Serbia to cede Ston and Pelješac to Ragusa in return for the so-called tribute of Ston.

In 1334, the Bosnian Bishop Peter died, and a huge dispute began over his successor. Hungarian King Charles Robert managed to replace his supporter, but it would take until 1336 for the final dispute to be resolved in the Catholic Church's favour.

Pope Benedict XII lost all patience and eventually accepted the offer of Prince Nelipac of Croatia in 1337, who not only wanted to restore Bosnia under Croatian control, but also desired personal revenge on Stephen II Kotromanić for the past troubles that he had caused him. The still powerful Croatian Šubićs family protested Nelipac's decision. An arranged marriage was made between Bosnian Ban Stephen II's brother, Vladislav and the sister of Ban of Croatia Mladen III Šubić, Jelena Šubić in 1338 in Klis Fortress. Mladen III Šubić's wife was Jelena Nemanjić, sister of the Serbian King Stefan Dušan, so this created a strong dynastic alliance of three families: the Kotromanić, the Šubić and the Nemanjić that strictly opposed Prince Nelipac's reign. The first to fall to Nelipac's hand were the Šubićs who were, despite constant help from Stephen II, were forced to sign a peace treaty with Nelipac and compensate him for the war. Charles Robert did not watch easily as his subjected lands were being war-torn. He was preparing to move to Croatia and depose Nelipac. Stephen II seized the opportunity and pushed against Nelipac, talking some of his lands for himself.

Soon, Ban Stephen II would finally stop the constant threat of the Western Crusades to the Bosnian Church. In 1339, during Franciscan General Gerard's stay at the Hungarian Court of King Charles Robert, Gerard paid a visit to the Bosnian Ban to negotiate an arranged prosecution of Bosnia's heretics. At first, Stephen II thought that it was time to bow to the Roman Catholic Church; but he realised that the neighboring Orthodox Christians might stand up to him if he moved against the Bosnian Church, their allies. In addition, Serbia wanted a reason to involve itself in a conflict, for its King desired revenge for the losses in the Bosnian war against the Serbs, so Ban Stephen abandoned the thought. Nevertheless, Stephen's diplomatic efforts convinced the Pope that he was a loyal Catholic in February 1340, once again saving Bosnia.

After the final peace between the Bosnian Ban and the Papacy, the Catholic Church started to grow in influence rapidly throughout Bosnia in 1340–43. The Roman Catholic monks had constructed numerous monasteries in Usora and Hum and baptised a large number of Bosnia's heretics on their way to Ston in the Republic of Ragusa. This process eventually brought on the demise of the Bosnian Church that held supremacy over the religious life in Bosnia.

=== Changes in the throne ===
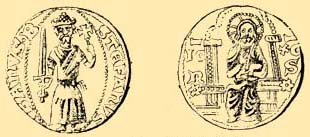
Seal of Stjepan Kotromanic

In 1342, Hungarian King Charles Robert died and so did Stephen II's past ally, Mikac of Slavonia in 1343. This gave rise to a new idea. The opportunity arose to detach Bosnia from the Kingdom of Hungary and for Ban Stephen II to rule it independently. He immediately sought help from Hungary's greatest foe, the Republic of Venice. In the summer of 1343 he sent an emissary to Venice, proposing an alliance. The Venetians wanted to act only if victory was certain, so they wanted another member in their alliance; their traditional ally, Serbia. The Serbian King was, unfortunately for the Venetians, busy with other matters. Venice was just waging war against Prince Nelipac, so it only agreed to arm and help build up Bosnia's military, but begged Stephen II not to move against Hungary without it. It became evident that the Venetians only wanted to push Ban Stephen II against Nelipac for additional support.

In 1344, Nelipac himself unexpectedly died, which prompted Hungarian nobility to ordered the new Slavonian Ban to seize Knin from Nelipac's widow Vladislava and her son Ivan. She attempted to negotiate help from Venice, but the Croatian nobility cut off the negotiations. The Hungarian King became impatient, so he commanded Ban Nikola to move to Knin immediately and ordered Ban Stephen II of Bosnia to send help at once. Ban Stephen came leading his forces. A large 10,000 strong Army was amassed near Knin, and this was only the first wave as the main part of the Army was arriving headed by the Hungarian King himself. This time Princess Vladislava Nelipić had no choice but to accept demands. The Hungarian King planned the shape of his coastal territories in the new order that he would create. He annexed several cities from the Nelipić family of Croatia, but left them the two largest until Stephen II gave the Cetina region back. Bosnian ban Stephen II swore an Oath to respect the treaty in front of his Twelve Knights, whom he had just formed out of the most valiant and experienced of the Bosnian nobility to assist him in his reign. In the middle of 1345 the new order was ratified in Bihać. The Hungarian King subsequently issued a proclamation in Zagreb accepting Ban Stephen II as a member of his family and returned with his 30,000 men to Hungary before attempting to reconquer the coastal cities taken by the Venetians.

Upon the numerous changes, Zadar switched side from Venice back to Hungary, but their letter missed the Hungarian King during his stay in Bihać, so they had to seek alternative allies whom they found in the Šubić and the Serbian King Stefan Dušan. When it became evident that the Venetians were going to attack, Zadar asked Hungary directly to intervene. The Hungarian King ordered Ban Stephen II and Ban Nikola of Slavonia to move with their forces in assistance. The two Bans moved with their 10,000 man Army to Zadar, only to find out that the Venetians had constructed an improvised wooden fortification with 28 bastidas (towers), huge enough to man the entire Venetian army. Deciding not to move against the Venetians, the Bans accepted a bribe of 1,000 florins each, although Zadar had accused them of treason.

The Hungarian King was amassing forces for a new strike against the Venetian positions, but both parties had elected the new Serbian Emperor Stefan Dušan to assist Ban Stephen II and form a mediation party to decide a truce between the two warring sides. Eventually, all agreements failed. In the spring of 1346 the Hungarian King arrived with his vast Royal Army of 100,000 men of whom more than 30,000 were cavalry and men-at-arms and 10,000 soldiers under Ban Stephen II arrived. The Venetians had attempted to bribe several Hungarian generals, including Ban Stephen II, who gave away the positions of the Hungarian troops for a handsome sum of money, thereby earning the nickname "Devil's Student". On 1 July 1346 a fierce clash occurred, which the Hungarian side eventually won only due to numerical superiority and achieved a pyrrhic victory with more than 7,000 Hungarian troops killed in battle. The Hungarian King lost trust in Ban Stephen II and, losing confidence as well, returned to Hungary.

Ban Stephen II played Venice and Hungary against each other, slowly ruling Bosnia more and more independently and soon initiated a conspiracy with some members of the Croatian and Hungarian nobility against his Hungarian liege. In 1346 Zadar finally returned to Venice, and the Hungarian King, seeing that he had lost the war, made peace in 1348. Ban of Croatia Mladen II Šubić was greatly opposed to Stephen II's policy, accusing him of treason and the relations between the two Bans worsened ever afterwards. Bosnian Ban Stephen II's relations with Venice started to improve, as the Bosnian Bishop Peregreen was a notable Venetian member of the Franciscan Order.

=== Continued conflict with Serbia ===
The Serbian Emperor Stefan Dušan was constantly demanding that Ban Stephen II Kotromanić return the Hum area to the Nemanjić dynasty, but Stephen II always refused.

Ban Stepen's Bosnia was weaker than the Serbian Empire, so he asked Venice, as a mutual ally, to act as a mediator. Eventually the Serbian Emperor accepted a three-year non-aggression pact because he was busy with his conflicts with the Byzantine Empire. The Bosnian Ban immediately proceeded with war preparations and went to construct a fortress in Hum, near the Neretva river. He also attempted to convince the Venetians to give him naval support in the case of war with the Tsar. The Venetians discouraged him from building a fort, but he constructed it anyway. The distant wars of Tsar Stefan Dušan gave Stephen II Kotromanić the chance to move first. In the Christmas of 1349 Bosnia's Ban moved quickly, proceeding all the way across Konavli which he raided heavily until he reached the Bay of Kotor. Trebinje, Gacko, and Rudine were razed during his military operations. Venice attempted to make another peace between the warring sides, but the Serbian emperor agreed only to stall his counterattack a little.

In October 1350, Tsar Stefan Dušan crossed the river of Drina with 50,000 cavalry and 30,000 infantry. Ban Stephen II did not have the strength to meet his army in open battle, so he decided to use a guerrilla tactic. Using timber and rock he blockaded all major roads in Bosnia and slowly withdrew his forces to forests and mountains, using impervious topography of his realm and forts to defend against advancing invader. He planned the defense of Bosnia, splitting his forces enough to defend every possible entryway into his realm. His plan soon started to break, as Dušan was able to bribe several of Ban's most trusted servants who abandoned their posts.

Losing control over the conflict, Ban Stephen II retreated with his most trusted men to the most unreachable mountains of Bosnia. He no longer knew whom he could trust, so he regularly dismissed and recruited new men to serve him. His older daughter Elizabeth hid from Dušan in Ban's court and one of Bosnia's strongest fortresses, Bobovac. Dušan's forces easily defeated the scattered Bosnian squadrons and went on a campaign to slowly conquer Bosnia. Eventually, Bobovac was besieged, but Dušan failed to seize it which will prove detrimental to success of his campaign. But he proceeded by ordering his armies to raid Bosnia. After creating a strong foothold with forces in Bosnia, Dušan sent a portion of his army on raiding quests towards Cetina and the other to Croatia towards Krka, while he returned with the rest of his troops to Serbia to resolve new conflicts that the Byzantines stirred in Macedonia.

Both failed siege of Bubovac and attempt to catch up with Ban Stephen II eventually compelled Dušan to abandon Bosnia and order his troops to retreat. Ban Stephen II therefore won the war, even though he lost most of the battles. This encouraged the Ban to refuse all suggestions from Dušan to share Hum as joint rulers. Dušan forces that remained in Hum tried to keep at least this region, however Ban Stephen II soon launched a military campaign and reconquered all the territories that he had previously lost to Dušan. The Republic of Ragusa was enraged by the war over the Hum because it greatly damaged their trade, so, backed up by the Venetian Republic, Dubrovnik suggested a peace to Dušan that would constitute a marriage between the Emperor's son King Stefan Uroš V and Stephen II's daughter Elizabeth. The peace treaty also required the giving of the Hum area to Stephen II, but as a land of the Nemanjić. Stephen II had better plans for his daughter, so he refused the agreement. Ban reasoned that a large multi-ethnic Empire ruled autocratically by one man could not succeed. Politically and militarily savvy Ban, now proved himself foresighted too, as he will soon start witnessing first traces of Dušan's Empire demise, while he regained full control over his realm, Bosnia.

=== Last years ===
The rest of Ban's reign passed mostly in peace. The only conflict that he had was a dispute with the Republic of Venice and Dubrovnik since the Ban's men had raided their trade caravan. The Ban managed to elevate his supporter, Monk Petergreen as the new Bosnian Bishop. After 1352 Stephen II referred to himself as Bosnia's Herzeg (or herceg) in resemblance of the German title. The same year he gave his sister or niece, Marija, in marriage to Count Ulrich of Helfenstein, which was sanctioned by the Hungarian King. He sent his daughter Catherine (some sources describe Catherine as the daughter of Stephen's brother Vladislav) to marry Count Hermann I of Celje, but the actual marriage happened long after Stephen II's death.

Elizabeth of Poland, the mother of the King of Hungary, wanted to arrange a marriage between her son and Stephen's daughter Elizabeth. She insisted immediately on bringing her to the Hungarian court for fosterage. Stephen was reluctant at first, but eventually dispatched Elizabeth. After three years of life at the Hungarian court, the King's mother invited Stephen to Hungary for the wedding. The Bosnian Ban became gravely ill and could not be present at the ceremony.

Stephen II Kotromanić died in September 1353. He was ceremonially buried in his own foundation, the Roman Catholic Church of Saint Nicholas of the "Little Brother" in Mile, near Visoko. He was succeeded by his underage nephew Tvrtko, son of Stephen's brother Vladislav Kotromanić, with Vladislav governing in Tvrtko's name.

== Edicts ==
Stephen withdrew all demands as can be seen in his edict to the Republic from 1332 in which he guaranteed future friendships between the Banate of Bosnia and the Republic of Ragusa. In the edict he called his people Bosnians (Bošnjani).

Ban Stephen II issued several edicts to Ragusa in 1333. There were four documents. Here is an excerpt of the documents edict' copies:

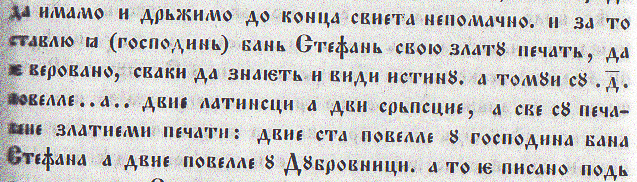
Scanned copy of the Charter of Stephen II Kotromanić from 1333

Original version

да имамо и дрьжимо до конца свиета непомачно. и за то
ставлю я (господинь) бань Стефань свою златꙋ печать, да
ѥ веровано, сваки да знаѥеть и види истинꙋ. а томꙋи сꙋ .д̄.
повелле..а.. двие латинсци а дви срьпсцие, а све сꙋ печа-
тене златиеми печати: двие ста повелле ꙋ господина бана
Стефана а двие повелле ꙋ Дꙋбровници. а то ѥ писано подь

English translation

to have and hold to the end of the world moveless. And for that
have put I (lord) ban Stefan my golden seal, to
be believed, everyone to know and see the truth. And to that are IV
charters..a.. two Latin and two Serbian, and all are sea-
led with golden seals: two are charters in lord ban
Stefan and two charters in Dubrovnik. And that is written under

Of 60 words in the excerpt:

- 29 (48.3%) are completely the same in contemporary Bosnian — or, for that matter Croatian or Serbian
- 15 (25%) differ only in slightly changed sound of a letter (usually through iotation, or loss or it, or by transfer of "ou" to "u")
- 8 (13.3%) differ in one phoneme
- * 8 (13.3%) differ more but are fully recognisable

== Title ==
- "Lord of all Bosnian lands, and Soli, and Usora, and Donji Kraji, and the Hum land"

== Marriages and children ==
He was married to:

- a Catholic lady, a cousin of some sort, dispensation requested in 1318. Possibly a daughter of Count Meinhard of Ortenburg in Carniola (concluded from sources, this remained an engagement only, the couple not having come to live together)
- daughter of Tsar Michael Shishman of Bulgaria, in 1329
- Elizabeth of Kuyavia, daughter of Duke Kazimierz III of Gniewkowo, nephew of Ladislaus the Short, king of Poland, since June 1335.

According to Dominik Mandić he had at least four children.

- Catherine (1336–21 March 1385), who married Herman I of Celje in 1361. She was the mother of Herman II, Count of Celje. Born out of the marriage with the Ortenburg countess (Mandić). She may have been his niece rather than daughter.
- Vuk, who died during his father's lifetime. Born out of the marriage with the Ortenburg countess (Mandić).
- Stjepan. Born out of the marriage with Elizabeth (Mandić).
- Elizabeth (1340–1387), who married Hungarian King Louis I the Great on 20 June 1353. Having become the regent of Hungary, she was murdered. Born out of the marriage with Elizabeth (Mandić).

== See also ==
- List of rulers of Bosnia

== Bibliography ==
- Fine, John Van Antwerp (1994). The Late Medieval Balkans: A Critical Survey from the Late Twelfth Century to the Ottoman Conquest. Michigan: The University of Michigan Press. ISBN 0472100793.

Regnal titles
Vacant Mladen II as overlord Title last held by Mladen I	Ban of Bosnia; 1322–1353	Succeeded by Tvrtko I
Preceded by Milutin	Ban of Usora-Soli; 1322–1353	Succeeded by Tvrtko I
