= Mile, Visoko =

Crowning and burial church of Bosnian kings

Mile
- Mili
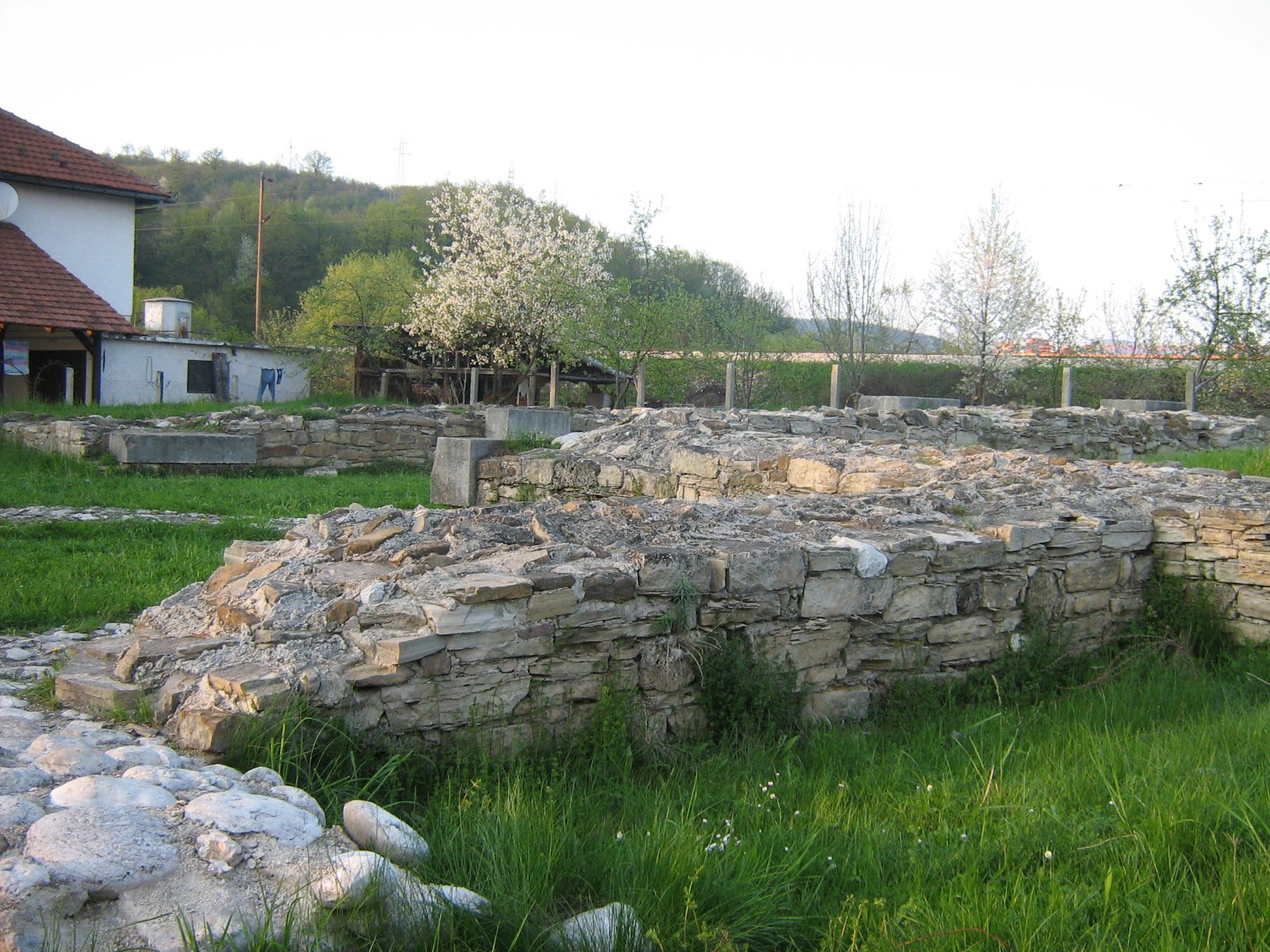
- Remains of the church

- Location within Bosnia and Herzegovina
- Interactive map of Mile
- Location: Arnautovići
- Nearest city: Visoko

History
- Founded: 1340
- Founder: Stjepan II
- Built: 1340
- Built for: Royal family
- Original use: Royal coronation and burial church

Site notes
- Architectural styles: Gothic & vernacular
- Current use: National monument & archeological site
- Owner: State

KONS of Bosnia and Herzegovina
- Official name: Mile, the archaeological site – the coronation and sepulchral church of the Bosnian kings, Arnautovići
- Type: Category I monument
- Criteria: II. Value; A, B, C i.ii.v., D i.ii.iii.iv., E, F i.
- Designated: 2 July 2003 (session No. )
- Reference no.: 1341
- Decision no.: 06-6-894/03-2
- Listed: List of National Monuments of Bosnia and Herzegovina
- Operator: -

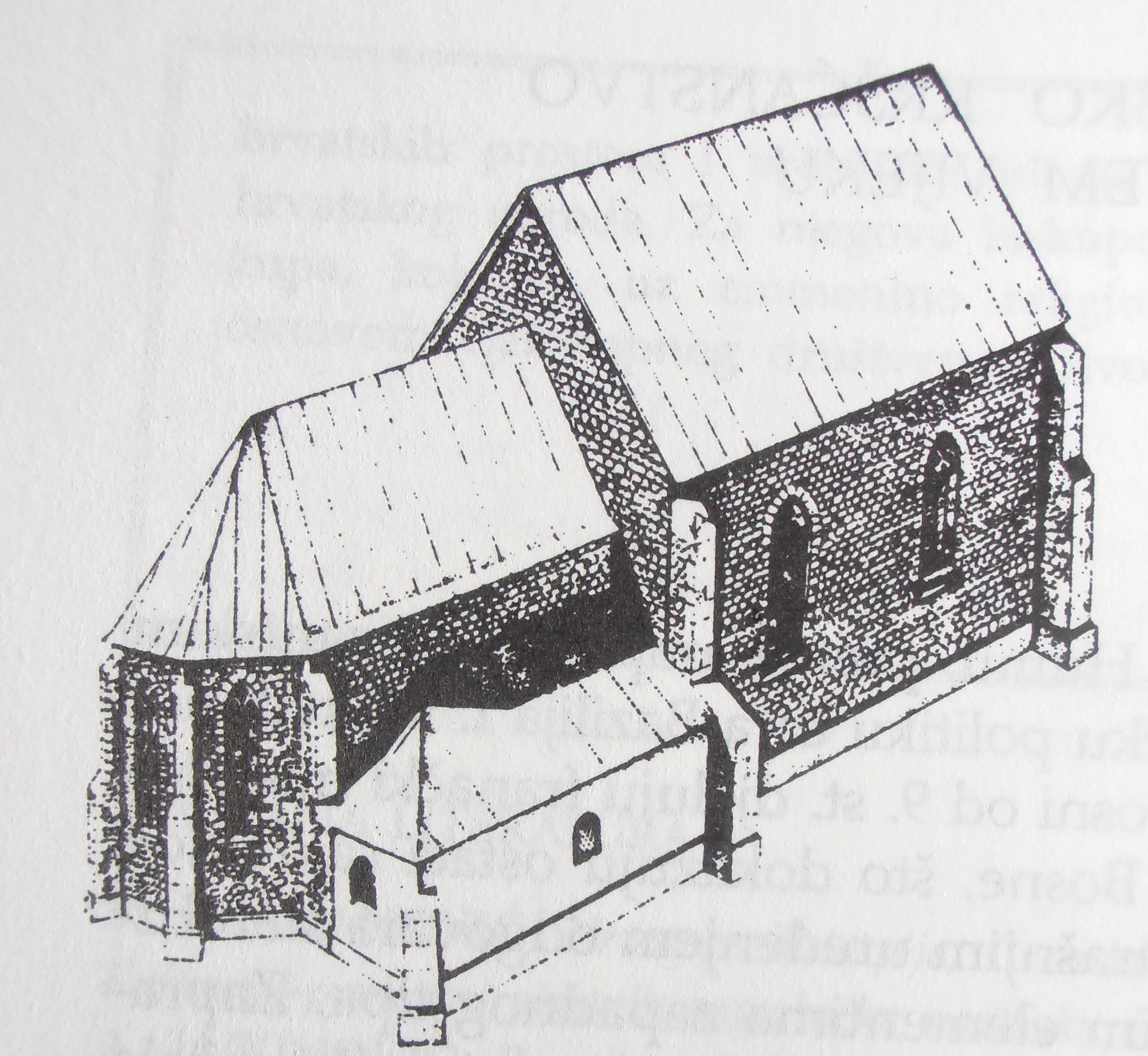
Church reconstruction

Mile (Cyrillic: Миле) is archaeological medieval site located in the Visoko basin, in present day Arnautovići village near Visoko, Bosnia and Herzegovina. The site was a medieval crowning and burial church of Bosnian kings during the Bosnian Banate and later Kingdom, between its construction in 1340 and the fall of the Kingdom in 1463.

Mile is an inscribed as the National Monument of Bosnia and Herzegovina, in 2003 by KONS.

== History ==
Mile held a great importance for Bosnian nobility and was one of the places for Stanak, the most common name used to refer to the assembly of nobility in medieval Bosnia.

Mile was first mentioned (in written sources: Mile, Sv. Nikola, Visoko, Mileševo) in 1244, as a place of the Church of Saints Cosmas and Damian. In 1340, Stephen II Kotromanić built the first Franciscan friary of Saint Nicholas.

From 1367 to 1407 several historical sources mention Ragusan merchants who gave money contributions for the Franciscan friary that was located in Mile, which is, according to sources from 1380 to 1390, identified as Stephen II Kotromanić ban's foundation, the Franciscan friary of Saint Nicholas of the Little Brothers.

== Crowning and burial church ==
Mile was the crowning place of Bosnian kings, beginning with a crowning of the first Bosnian king Tvrtko I Kotromanić in 1377.

The grave of Stephen II, who died in 1353, couldn't be identified in later archaeological excavations. Mavro Orbini and later authors cite that Stephen II built a church in Mile, and by his own will wanted to be buried there. Tvrtko I's, King of Bosnia, grave has been located and identified in the north wall of the church.

== See also ==
- Royal court in Sutjeska
- Milodraž
- Visoko during the Middle Ages
- Old town of Visoki
- Visoko
- Podvisoki

== Sources ==
- Anđelić, Pavao (1979), "Krunidbena i grobna crkva bosanskih vladara u Milima (Arnautovićima) kod Visokog" [Coronation and burial church of Bosnian rulers in Mili (Arnautovići) near Visoko], Glasnik Zemaljskog muzeja (in Serbo-Croatian), XXXIV, Sarajevo 1980: Zemaljski muzej Bosne i Hercegovine
- Lovrenović, Dubravko, “Proglašenje Bosne kraljevinom 1377”, Forum Bosnae, 3-4, Sarajevo, 1999
