= Stephen I, Ban of Bosnia =

Stephen I

Ban of Bosnia
- Reign: 1287–1314
- Predecessor: Prijezda I
- Successor: Stephen II
- Born: 1242; Bosnia
- Died: 1314 (aged 71–72); Bosnia
- Burial: Mile, near Visoko
- Spouse: Elizabeth of Serbia
- Issue: Vladislaus; Ninoslaus; Stephen II another son Catherine; Mary
- House: Kotromanić
- Father: Prijezda I
- Mother: Elizabeth of Slavonia

Stephen I Kotromanić (Serbo-Croatian: Стефан I / Stjepan I; 1242–1314) was a Bosnian Ban from 1287 to 1290 jointly with Ban Prijezda II and 1290–1314 alone as a vassal of the Kingdom of Hungary.

== Origin ==
His ancestry is not known precisely. It is believed that he was the son of a German nobleman Gotfrid, founder of the family he belonged to Kelad went to strengthen the Hungarian hold in Bosnia in 1162 or 1163. This German nobleman co-signed the edicts for Bosnia in the Split Church in 1163 with the Hungarian King Stephen IV. Apparently, the Hungarian King Stephen III invited him to place him as a regional ruler in Hungary's name because of his ancestor's successes. Kotroman ruled as a vassal of this King. Mauro Orbini claimed in his work The Kingdom of Slavs that the Ragusan document refers to him as " Cotrumano Goto", i.e. Kotroman the German but it's unclear from where did Orbini make this reference. It has also been speculated that Kotroman might have been a son of Bosnian Ban Prijezda I.

== Biography ==
=== Before Banate ===
Since 1287, when his father, Ban Prijezda I withdrew from power, Kotroman ruled jointly as Ban of Bosnia with another son of Prijezda I, Prijezda II. Kotroman separated the country with Prijezda II, and took eastern Bosnia. After the death of Prijezda II, Kotroman became the sole Ban of Bosnia in 1290.

=== Marriage ===
In 1284 he married Elizabeth of Serbia, daughter of the King of Syrmia, Stefan Dragutin of the House of Nemanjić, and Queen Catherine, daughter of Hungarian King Stephen V and Elizabeth the Cuman. Dragutin had already controlled two banates in Bosnia: Usora and Soli and Kotroman immediately fell under his influence – many of his acts were at Dragutin's command. The marriage was political and arranged by Ban Prijezda II who had attempted to forge an alliance with Stefan Dragutin.

=== Hungarian War of Succession ===
In 1290 Hungarian King Ladislaus IV died leaving no heirs to the throne. The cousin of Ladislaus IV, Andrew III, was crowned King, despite the desire of the sister of the former King Ladislaus IV, Mary of Hungary, Queen of Naples, who wanted her son, Charles Martel as the new King in Hungary. The latter party had much more support, so Pope Nicholas IV had crowned Charles Martel as King of Hungary. This movement was supported by the most powerful Croatian nobility, the Šubićs, Princes of Bribir. As the current head of the family, Paul Šubić was also son-in-law of King Stefan Dragutin, family connections made Kotroman support Charles Martel's crowning. To increase his influence in Kotroman's realm, Charles Martel issued numerous edicts to split the land among the lesser gentry to gain support for his reign. It appears that he gave the reign over Bosnia to the Šubićs. Charles Martel died unexpectedly in 1295, before the campaign to seize the power in Hungary was finished. The Queen of Naples and sister of former King Ladislaus IV, Mary, had then decided to put her grandson, son of Charles Martel, Charles Robert as the future King of Hungary. Pope Boniface VIII declared the twelve-year-old boy as King Charles I of Hungary in 1297. Paul Šubić of Croatia declared himself as "Dominus of Bosnia" in 1299 and gave the title of Bosnian Ban to his brother, Mladen I Šubić. All of Kotroman's land except for the Donji Kraji (transl. Lower Ends – transl. Lower Edges), which was ruled by Prince Hrvatin Stjepanić as a vassal of the Šubićs, was held by the House of Šubić; as was confirmed by Charles I Robert. Paul Šubić wanted to bring King Charles Robert to Split across Croatia to Zagreb, which would become the main station of his campaign against King Andrew III of Hungary. During the preparations for war, Andrew III died unexpectedly. Charles Robert assessed the Hungarian throne, but had to fight numerous opponents to his regime up to 1309.

=== Internal wars ===
Stephen Kotroman had resisted the growth of the Šubićs' power in Bosnia, but had lost by 1302 most control over the land to Mladen I Šubić. Although, Kotroman was not defeated as he still had some influence and power in Bosnia. His father-in-law King Stefan Dragutin could not send him aid since a succession-war had erupted in the Serbian Kingdom between him and his brother, the powerful King Stefan Milutin. Additionally, during the problems over the Hungarian crown, Dragutin had attempted to insert his son Vladislav as the new King of Hungary.

Despite the many difficulties, Stephen Kotroman had held out. The war turned into religious conflict, as Mladen I Šubić had started a campaign to exterminate the adherents of the Bosnian Church – the kristjani. This balanced the conflict in Kotroman's favour, as number of kristjani had joined his side because of this. After his death Paul Šubić in 1305 proclaimed himself "lord of All Bosnia".

=== End of reign ===
Paul's reign did not last long as he died in 1312. The disappointed Ban Stephen Kotroman died in 1314, before he managed to act.

== Issue ==
Stephen and Elisabeth had six children:

- Vladislaus
- Ninoslaus
- Stephen
- Son
- Catherine, who married Prince Nicholas of Zahumlje in 1338
- Mary

Stephen II was to succeed Kotroman as Bosnian Ban; but had to flee to the Republic of Ragusa to hide from the Šubićs with his brothers and their mother, Elizabeth.

== Sources ==
- Bataković, Dušan T., ed. (2005). Histoire du peuple serbe [History of the Serbian People] (in French). Lausanne: L’Age d’Homme. ISBN 9782825119587.
- Ćirković, Sima (2004). The Serbs. Malden: Blackwell Publishing. ISBN 9781405142915.
- Engel, Pál (2001). The Realm of St. Stephen: A History of Medieval Hungary, 895-1526. London & New York: I.B.Tauris. ISBN 9781850439776.
- Fine, John Van Antwerp Jr. (1994) [1987]. The Late Medieval Balkans: A Critical Survey from the Late Twelfth Century to the Ottoman Conquest. Ann Arbor, Michigan: University of Michigan Press. ISBN 0472082604.
- Jireček, Constantin (1911). Geschichte der Serben. Vol. 1. Gotha: Perthes.
- Krstić, Aleksandar R. (2016). "The Rival and the Vassal of Charles Robert of Anjou: King Vladislav II Nemanjić". Banatica. 26 (2): 33–51.

Regnal titles
Preceded by Prijezda I	Ban of Bosnia; 1287–1299 with Prijezda I (1287-1289)	Succeeded by Pavao I Šubić Bribirski
