= Tropolje =

Historical region in Bosnia and Herzegovina

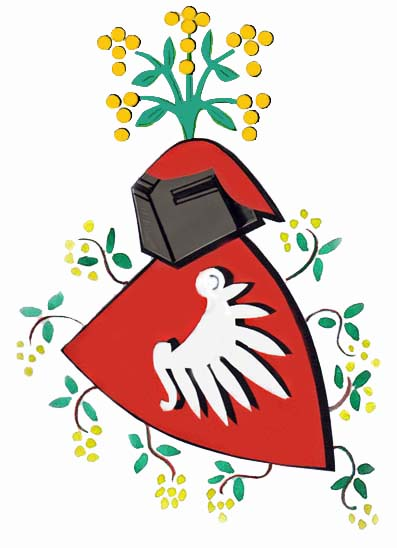
Coat of arms of the Šubić family

Tropolje was a historical Croatian duchy, which was located on the borderland of Croatia, Bosnia and Zachlumia. Its exact borders are disputed among historians.

== History ==
Historians have different opinions on Tropolje's borders. Vjekoslav Klaić thought that Tropolje encompassed the Cetinsko Polje, Livanjsko Polje and Duvanjsko Polje, and possibly other poljes on the borderland of Croatia, Bosnia, and Zachlumia. Marko Perojević, on the other hand, argued that Tropolje included the Kosovo Polje (near Knin), Petrovo Polje (near Drniš) and Mućko Polje. Additionally, Dominik Mandić included Livanjsko Polje as well. Sima Ćirković held that Tropolje stretched over Livanjsko Polje, Duvanjsko Polje and Glamočko Polje. Krunoslav Draganović and Damir Karbić argued that Tropolje included Duvanjsko Polje, Kupreško Polje, and Glamočko Polje. Karbić, agreeing with Draganović, said that a document from 1301 supports his conclusion and that the northern borders thus defined, fitted the borders of the Diocese of Duvno. The document from 1301, to which Karbić was referring, mentions the sons of Paul I Šubić of Bribir – Mladen, George and Paul, as "Duke of Tropolje, Livno and Cetina", who adopted the title on the verge of the 13th to 14th century after securing the territory of the eastern Adriatic hinterland.
