= Jelena Šubić =

Noblewoman, regent of Bosnia

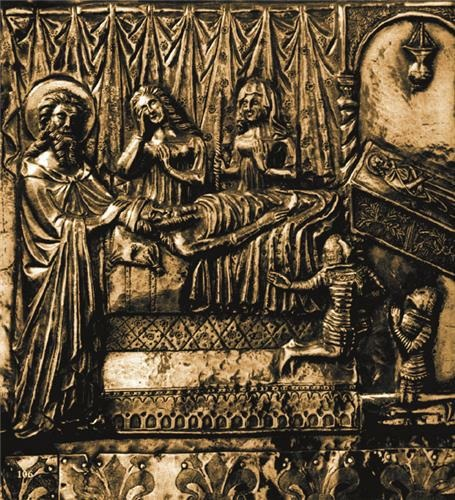
Jelena holding a candle (upper right) at the deathbed of her brother-in-law Stephen, as depicted on the Chest of Saint Simeon, dated 1380. She is surrounded by her niece Elizabeth and son(s).

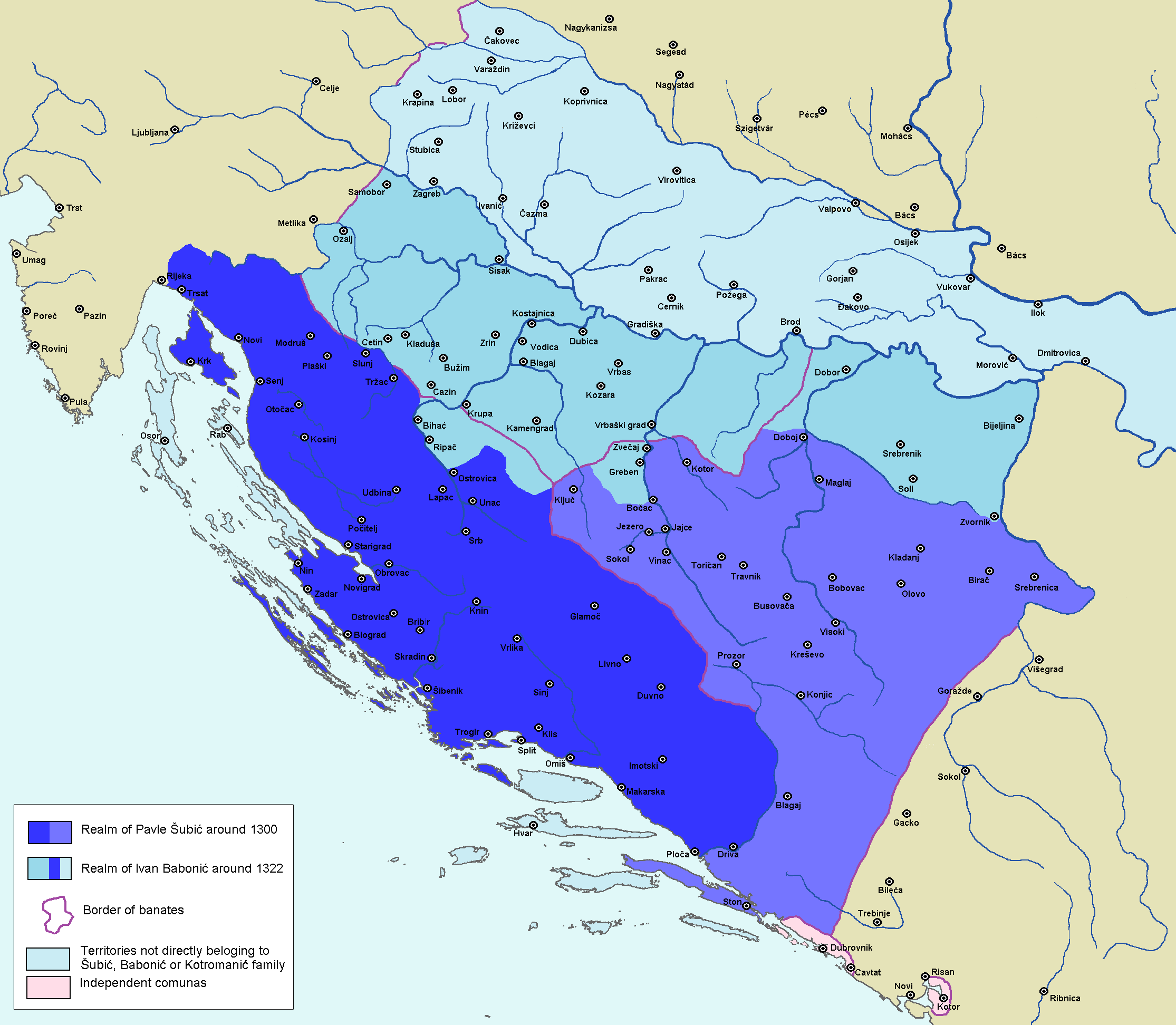
Map of Croatia and Bosnia at the beginning of the 14th century, when Jelena was born

Jelena Šubić (died c. 1378) was a member of the Bribir branch of the Croatian Šubić noble family, who ruled the Banate of Bosnia as regent from 1354 until 1357 during the minority of her son Tvrtko I of Bosnia.

== Life ==
Jelena was the daughter of the Croatian lord George II Šubić of Bribir, Count of Klis. She married Vladislav, brother of Ban Stephen II of Bosnia, in Klis Fortress in late 1337 or early 1338. Lampridio Vitturi, Bishop of Trogir, celebrated the marriage; Trogir authorities hostile to him later complained to the papacy that the marriage was uncanonical due to the couple having been descended from the same ancestor. Jelena and Vladislav had two sons, Tvrtko and Vuk.

=== Regency ===
Tvrtko was about 15 years old when he became Ban of Bosnia upon the death of Jelena's brother-in-law in the fall of 1353. Jelena and Vladislav, who was excluded from succession for unknown reasons, assumed government in the name of the young Ban. Widowed within a year, Jelena continued ruling on Tvrtko's behalf alone. Accompanied by her younger son, Jelena immediately traveled to the court of their overlord, King Louis I of Hungary, to seek his consent to Tvrtko's accession. Louis tasked her with delivering a message to her sister-in-law Jelena Nemanjić, widow of her brother Mladen III, who was trying to keep hold of the Kliss Fortress. Upon her return to Bosnia, Jelena presided over an assembly (stanak) in Mile and confirmed the possessions and privileges of the noblemen of "all of Bosnia, Donji Kraji, Zagorje and the Hum land". In May 1355 she decided to take an active part in the dispute over the Šubić family inheritance, which had been ongoing since the death of her brother Mladen in 1348. Jelena marched with Tvrtko and their army to Duvno. An agreement was concluded by which her son was to inherit all cities held by her father and a city held by her sister Katarina.

Jelena's regency ended in 1357. She and her sons were granted citizenship by the Republic of Venice in 1364. Two years later she accompanied Tvrtko to the Hungarian royal court following his brief deposition in favor of Vuk; Tvrtko reinstated himself within a year. In the fall of 1374, Jelena organized and attended the wedding of her son and Dorothea of Bulgaria.
