= Vladislav of Bosnia =

Ban of Bosnia

Vladislav
- knez

Ban of Bosnia (de facto)
- Reign: 1353 – 1354
- Predecessor: Stephen II, Ban of Bosnia
- Successor: Tvrtko I of Bosnia
- Died: 1354
- Spouse: Jelena Šubić
- Issue: Tvrtko I of Bosnia; Vuk, Ban of Bosnia (?) Ostoja of Bosnia
- House: Kotromanić
- Father: Stephen I, Ban of Bosnia
- Mother: Elizabeth of Serbia

Vladislav of Bosnia (Serbo-Croatian: Vladislav Kotromanić/Владислав Котроманић; died 1354) was a member of the House of Kotromanić who effectively ruled the Banate of Bosnia from September 1353 to his death.

Vladislav was a younger son of Stephen I, Ban of Bosnia, and Elizabeth of Serbia. Upon the death of Ban Stephen I in c. 1314, Vladislav's mother assumed regency in the name of his older brother, Ban Stephen II. Unclear circumstances soon forced her to flee Bosnia and seek refuge in the Republic of Ragusa. She took her children with her, and Ragusan documents show they spent several years there in exile. The 16th-century chronicler Mavro Orbini states that only Stephen followed Elizabeth, while Vladislav and his brother Ninoslav went to the Croatian town of Medvedgrad. By the summer of 1319, the Kotromanić family were back in Bosnia. Vladislav and Stephen took part in a great coalition of noblemen against their overlord Mladen II Šubić of Bribir, causing his downfall and bringing the House of Kotromanić directly under the suzerainty of King Charles I of Hungary. The brothers then proceeded to assist the Ban of Slavonia in conflicts with Croatian magnates. Vladislav, titled knez, appears as co-granter of Stephen II's charters to the Hrvatinić noble family between 1326 and 1331.

In late 1337 or early 1338, he married Jelena, daughter of George II Šubić of Bribir. The marriage ceremony was performed by Lampridio Vitturi, Bishop of Trogir. The city authorities hostile to him later complained to the papacy that the marriage was uncanonical due to consanguinity of the couple. They nevertheless stayed together and had two sons, Tvrtko and Vuk.

Stephen II died in 1353, leaving behind no sons. For reasons unknown, Vladislav was excluded from succession, and the title Ban of Bosnia passed directly to his son Tvrtko. Tvrtko, however, was only about 15 years old at the time, so Vladislav assumed the reins of government with his wife. He immediately took the young Ban on a tour throughout Bosnia, during which they settled relations with vassals. Despite his son being the enthroned ruler, Vladislav's name took precedence in charters, suggesting that the Ban was eclipsed by his father.

Vladislav died in 1354, less than a year into his regency, leaving his widow to rule in Tvrtko's name until 1357.
