= Paul Horvat =

Hungarian and Croatian nobleman

Paul Horvat Pavao Horvat / Pál Horváti
- Bishop of Zagreb
- Archdiocese: Archdiocese of Esztergom
- Appointed: 1379
- Term ended: 1386
- Predecessor: Demeter
- Successor: John Smilo

Personal details
- Died: after 1394
- Denomination: Roman Catholicism
- Parents: Peter Horvat

Paul Horvat (Croatian: Pavao Horvat; Hungarian: Pál Horváti) was a Hungarian and Croatian nobleman and the 28th bishop of Zagreb from 1379 to 1386.

Paul was the brother of Ladislaus and John Horvat, and the nephew of John of Palisna. Paul, who succeeded Cardinal Demeter in 1379, was trusted by King Louis I of Hungary. The king died in 1382, while the bishop was on pilgrimage in Jerusalem. His elder surviving daughter, Queen Mary, was crowned his successor. Horváti joined the opposition to the underage Queen Mary and her mother, Louis' widow Elizabeth of Bosnia, who ruled in her name as regent. He invited King Charles III of Naples, Louis' closest agnate, to come to Hungary and claim the crown. Charles succeeded in assuming the Hungarian crown in late 1386, but Queen Elizabeth soon had him murdered.

After Charles' death, John and Ladislaus, along with other revolting nobles from Croatia, were granted shelter in Zagreb by Paul. Paul pawned church estates in order to collect money for an army against Elizabeth.

In 1386, the bishop's brothers and uncle captured the queens in Gorjani and imprisoned them. Elizabeth was strangled on the orders of the bishop's uncle, while Mary was eventually released by her husband, Sigismund of Luxembourg, who had recently been crowned king of Hungary. King Tvrtko I of Bosnia, Elizabeth's first cousin, was an ally of the Horvats, and made them governors of Usora. However, in 1394, after Tvrtko's death, John Horvat was captured at Dobor and executed in Pécs on the orders of Queen Mary and King Sigismund.
What happened to Paul is unknown. He may have been captured and executed together with his brother in August 1394, but he may have also fled to Apulia and served as counselor to Charles' son and successor, King Ladislaus of Naples.

== Sources ==
- Engel, Pál; Ayton, Andrew; Pálosfalvi, Tamás (1999). The realm of St. Stephen: a history of medieval Hungary, 895–1526 Volume 19 of International Library of Historical Studies. Penn State Press. ISBN 978-0-271-01758-7.
- Šišić, Ferdo (1902). Vojvoda Hrvoje Vukc̆ić Hrvatinić i njegovo doba (1350-1416). Zagreb: Matice hrvatske.
- Van Antwerp Fine, John (1994). The Late Medieval Balkans: A Critical Survey from the Late Twelfth Century to the Ottoman Conquest. University of Michigan Press. ISBN 978-0-472-08260-5.

Paul House of Horvat
Religious titles
Preceded by Demeter	Bishop of Zagreb; 1379 –1386	Succeeded by John Smilo
