= Lampridius =

Lampridius may refer to:

- Aelius Lampridius, one of the six Scriptores in Augustan History
- Lampridius (archbishop), consecrator of Church of St. Chrysogonus
