= John Horvat =

14th-century Croatian nobleman

- Ban of Macsó
- Reign: 1376 – 1381; 1385 – 1386
- Native name: Ivan Horvat
- Died: 15 August 1394; Pécs, Hungary

John Horvat (Croatian: Ivan Horvat; Hungarian: Horváti János; died 15 August 1394) was a Croato–Hungarian nobleman in the Kingdom of Hungary-Croatia who served as Ban of Macsó from 1376 to 1381, and again between 1385 and 1386.

John Horvat was the brother of Ladislaus and Paul, Bishop of Zagreb, and nephew of John of Palisna. Together with his uncle, John Horvat led the uprising against Mary, Queen of Hungary and her mother and regent, Elizabeth of Bosnia. He assisted King Charles III of Naples in deposing Mary and assuming the Hungarian crown in late 1385. Queen Elizabeth soon had Charles murdered. In 1386, Horvat and his uncle captured the queens in Gorjani and imprisoned them. Elizabeth was strangled on the orders of Horvat's uncle, while Mary was eventually released by her husband, Sigismund of Luxembourg, who had recently been crowned king of Hungary.

John Horvat's ally was Elizabeth's first cousin, King Tvrtko I of Bosnia, who appointed him and his brothers governors of Usora, where they had Dobor Castle built. John Horvat himself was also granted the city of Omiš by King Tvrtko. However, Tvrtko died in 1391 and three years later, Horvat was captured by King Sigismund near Dobor. Sigismund and Mary then avenged her mother's death by having Horvat brutally executed in Pécs on 15 August 1394.

== Bibliography ==
- Engel, Pal; Ayton, Andrew; Pálosfalvi, Tamás (1999). The realm of St. Stephen: a history of medieval Hungary, 895–1526 Volume 19 of International Library of Historical Studies. Penn State University Press. ISBN 0-271-01758-9.
- Fine, John Van Antwerp (1994). The Late Medieval Balkans: A Critical Survey from the Late Twelfth Century to the Ottoman Conquest. University of Michigan Press. ISBN 0-472-08260-4.

John House of Horvat
Political offices
Preceded by Nicholas I Garay	Ban of Macsó; 1376–1381	Succeeded by Paul Liszkói
Preceded by Stephen Kórógyi	Ban of Macsó; 1385–1386	Succeeded by John Bánfi
