= Dobor Fortress =

Medieval town in Bosnia and Herzegovina

Coordinates: 44.971006°N 18.266826°E

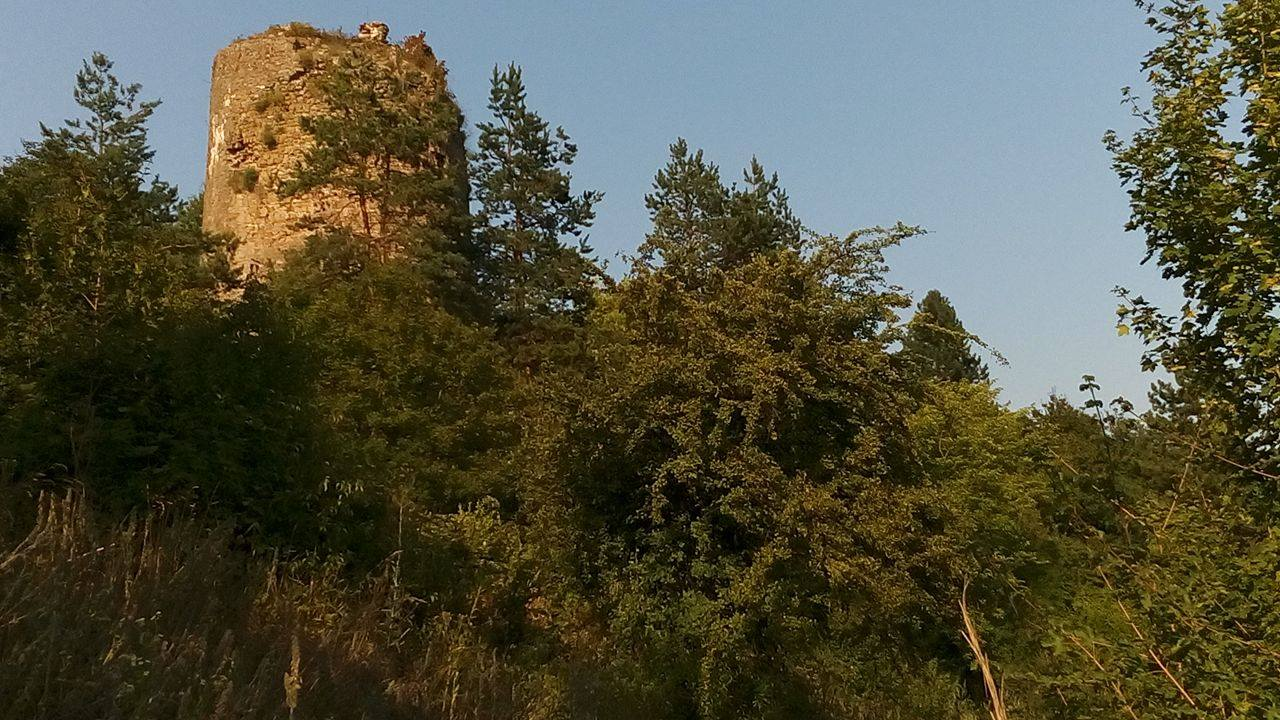
Ruins of Dobor fortress

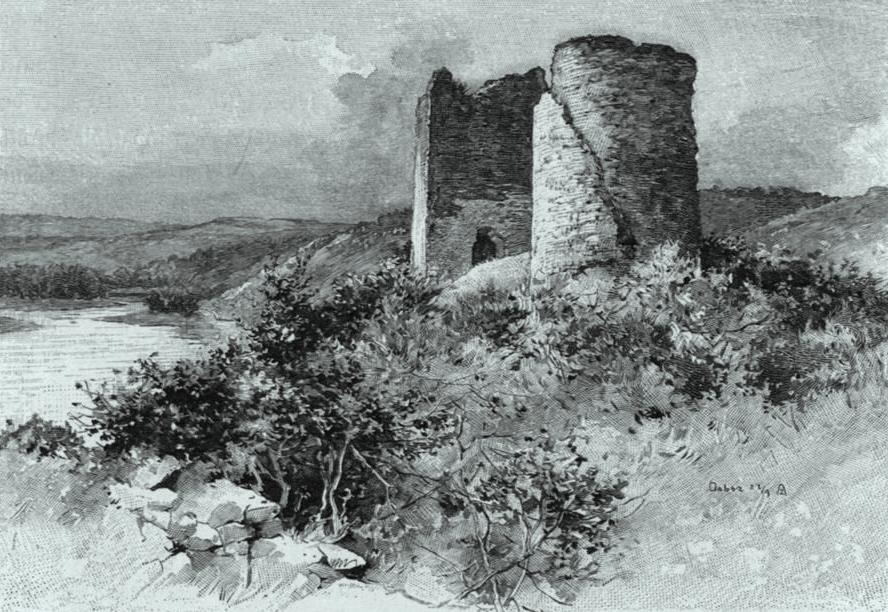
Dobor fortress in 1901

Dobor was a medieval town of the Usora Zemlja, in present-day Bosnia and Herzegovina, located some 4 km northwest of Modriča, on the left side of the Bosna River, on the Vučjak hill with an average height of 39 meters.

== History ==
As a border town, Dobor’s medieval history is largely related to Bosnian-Hungarian relations, from whose episodes, whether it is war or negotiations, we can read written traces of this city.

It was built by the brothers Paul Horvat, Bishop of Zagreb and John Horvat, Ban of Macsó around 1387 as a stronghold in the fight against Sigismund of Luxembourg, who captured Dobor in 1394 and 1408. From 1470 the town was in the possession of the Berislavićs, and in 1536 it was captured by the Ottoman Empire. In 1716 Dobor was captured by the Austrians. In 1718 it was returned to the Sultan, but the garrison never returned. Today it is in ruins.

== Architecture ==
Dobor is one of the most original medieval Bosnian towns in terms of its architecture. The core of the city of Dobor consists of two towers, which enclose a small space measuring 16x8 meters. Most of the preserved architecture dates from the 15th century, when the city was expanded on the eastern side. One tower was built at the time of the use of cannons and has the shape of an irregular cylinder, 20 meters high, and the other tower has the characteristic shape of an inverted Latin letter D, 19.5 meters high.

== See also ==
- Battle of Dobor (1394)
- Battle of Dobor (1408)

== Sources ==
- "Old Dobor fort, the architectural ensemble". aplikacija.kons.gov.ba (in Serbo-Croatian and English). Commission to preserve national monuments. 16 March 2005.
