= Catherine of Hungary (1370–1378) =

Hungarian princess

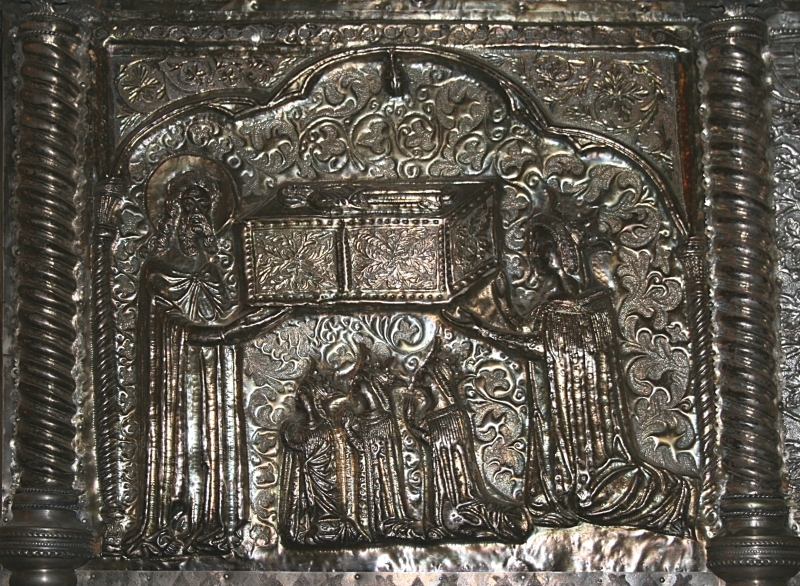
- Catherine and her sisters kneeling in front of their mother, who is presenting the casket to St. Simeon
- Born: early July 1370; Hungary
- Died: May 1378 (aged 7); Hungary
- Burial: Székesfehérvár Basilica
- House: Anjou-Hungary
- Father: Louis I of Hungary
- Mother: Elizabeth of Bosnia

Catherine of Hungary (Hungarian: Katalin, Polish: Katarzyna; July 1370 – May 1378), a member of the Capetian House of Anjou, was heir presumptive to the thrones of Hungary and Poland as eldest child of King Louis the Great and his second wife, Elizabeth of Bosnia.

== Heir presumptive ==
Catherine's birth was long expected, as her parents, Louis I of Hungary and Elizabeth of Bosnia, were childless for the first seventeen years of their marriage.^{Note 1} Her birth also secured the succession to the Holy Crown of Hungary, to which Catherine was heir presumptive all her life.

Being the eldest daughter of the King of Hungary and Poland who had no sons, Catherine was a much wanted bride. When she was only four years old, she was betrothed to Louis, a younger son of King Charles V of France and future Duke of Orléans. Their marriage was supposed to establish a connection between the two branches of the French royal house. Her father made a set of concessions to the Polish noblemen in exchange for recognizing Catherine (or one of her sisters) as sovereign of Poland after his death. This agreement is known as the Privilege of Koszyce.

Thus, Catherine was expected to reign over Hungary and Poland. Her father also planned to leave her his claim to the Crown of Naples and the County of Provence, which were then held by his ailing and childless cousin Joanna I. She was supposed to be married to Louis upon reaching marriageable age, and he would retain the rights to Naples even if the marriage were childless and Catherine were to predecease him, while Provence would become a hereditary fiefdom of the House of Valois. The King of France asked Catherine's father to have Catherine recognised as heir presumptive to the Holy Crown of Hungary; although Provence was important to Charles, establishing a cadet branch of the House of Valois on the Hungarian throne was also significant, as Catherine's prospect of becoming queen of Naples was not realistic.

== Death and aftermath ==
However, Catherine died at the age of seven, predeceasing both her father and her cousin Joanna. The agreement between her father and the noblemen became null and void. Her younger sister Mary, who was betrothed to her fiancé, became heir presumptive and eventually monarch of Hungary. Catherine's youngest sister Jadwiga eventually became monarch of Poland.

== Ancestors ==
Ancestors of Catherine of Hungary (1370–1378)

Charles Martel of Naples
Charles I of Hungary
Clemence of Austria
Louis I of Hungary
Vladislaus I of Poland
Elizabeth of Poland
Hedwig of Kalisz
Catherine of Hungary
Stephen I, Ban of Bosnia
Stephen II, Ban of Bosnia
Elizabeth of Serbia
Elisabeth of Bosnia
Casimir II of Kuyavia
Elizabeth of Kuyavia

== See also ==
- Elizabeth of Slavonia (Catherine's cousin and predecessor as heiress of Hungary)
- Chest of Saint Simeon

== Notes ==
- ^Note 1 There may have been a daughter named Mary who died in infancy in 1366, but whether or not she existed is unclear.
