= John of Palisna =

John of Palisna Ivan od Paližne Joannes de Palisna
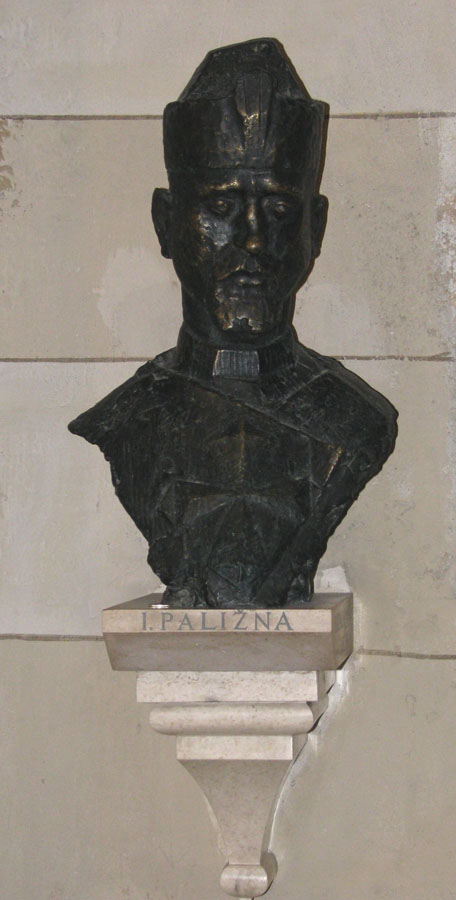
- John of Palisna statue in Zagreb Cathedral.

Ban (viceroy) of Croatia
- Reign: 1385 – 1386, 1389
- Predecessor: Toma of St. Juraj
- Successor: Ivan Frankopan of Krk

Ban of Slavonia
- Reign: 1385 – 1386, 1389
- Predecessor: Stjepan Bánffy and Ivan Bánffy
- Successor: Detrik Bubek
- Died: 23 March 1391; Vrana, Kingdom of Croatia

John of Palisna (Croatian: Ivan od Paližne, Latin: Joannes de Palisna) (? – 23 March 1391) was a Croatian knight and warrior, prior of Vrana, and Ban of Croatia.

== Prior of Vrana ==
It is unclear when John of Palisna became prior of Vrana. In May 1381 he was already prior, because the citizens of Zadar were complaining about him to the King of Hungary and Croatia. He co-ruled with relative Ivan (John) Anjou Horvat de Radics as a Ban of Croatia from 1385 to 1386, and in 1389.

In 1389, groups of crusaders linked to the Knights Hospitaller under a Domine Johanne Bano are mentioned as fighting in the battle of Kosovo in Annales Forolivienses. Domine Johanne Bano most probably refers to John of Palisna, although identification with a John Horvat has also been proposed. In the same year, John lost one of his last strongholds in Croatia, the Klis Fortress. Without the help from the Kingdom of Bosnia, John was unable to resist Sigismund's allies, especially when he personally went away, to fight against the Ottomans.

== Plot against Elizabeth ==
John of Palisna opposed the rule of Elizabeth of Bosnia. He was mainly opposed to the centralizing policy which Elizabeth's husband had enforced. He hoped to regain local independence by rising against Elizabeth. Elizabeth's own first cousin, King Tvrtko, with whom she was raised, decided to take advantage of Louis' death and Elizabeth's unpopularity by trying to recover the Dalmatian lands he had lost to Louis in 1357. John of Palisna asked Tvrtko for help but was ultimately defeated by Elizabeth's army and forced to flee to Bosnia.

== See also ==
- Knights Hospitaller
- Klis Fortress
- Novigrad Castle
- Elizabeth of Bosnia
