= Privilege of Koszyce =

Set of concessions made by Louis I of Hungary

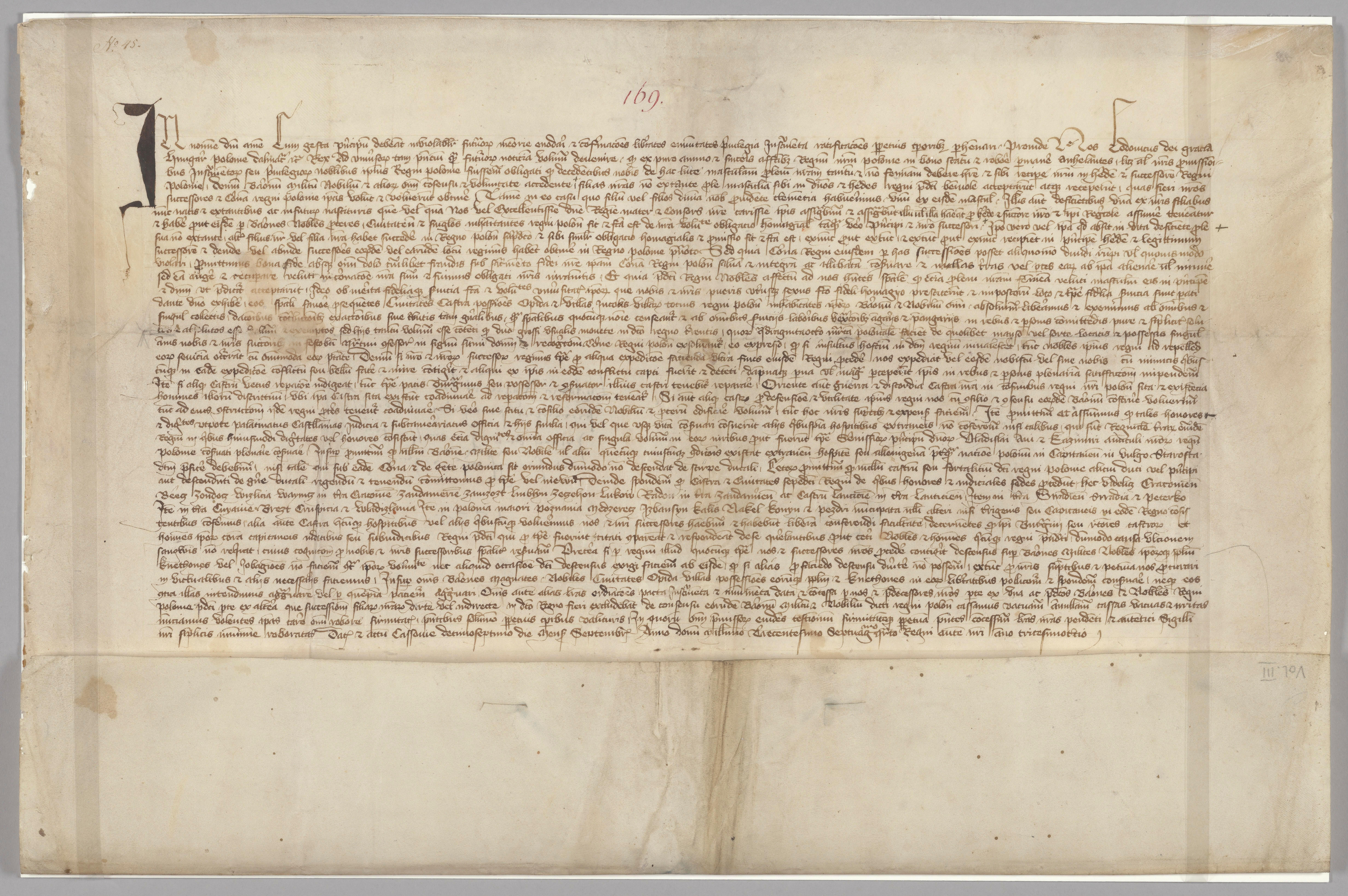
Privilege of Koszyce, 1374, Princes Czartoryski Library in Kraków

The Privilege of Koszyce or Privilege of Kassa was a set of concessions made by Louis I of Hungary to the Polish szlachta (nobility) in 1374. The privileges were granted in Kassa, Kingdom of Hungary (Polish: Koszyce; now Košice, Slovakia). In exchange, one of Louis's daughters (Catherine, Mary or Jadwiga) was to ascend the throne of Poland after his death.

The szlachta obtained the following privileges:

- release from the obligation to pay tribute, with the exception of a nominal or token of two groschen from one field, to the monarch;
- release from the duty to build and repair castles, except for those nobles holding territory in eastern Poland, where the threat from Lithuania was significant;
- the restriction of eligibility for certain offices to persons of Polish (as opposed to Lithuanian, Hungarian, or other) ethnicity;
- payment of soldiers' wages to the szlachta who personally fought in military campaigns;
- release from the duty to build towns and bridges;
- release from the duty to provide food, lodging, and other accommodations for the king and his court when he was traveling within the kingdom.

Louis's promising of the privileges was a success, as his youngest daughter Jadwiga eventually succeeded her father as monarch of Poland after the Greater Poland Civil War. Hungarian influence in Poland waned, as one of the conditions for Jadwiga's ascention to the Polish throne was the end of the Polish-Hungarian Union. Louis might have intended for the privileges to be rescindend, but his death prevented that from happening.

The privileges gave a significant power boost to the szlachta and influenced the Polish government for centuries.
