= Civil war in Greater Poland (1382–1385) =

Civil wars involving the states and peoples of Europe

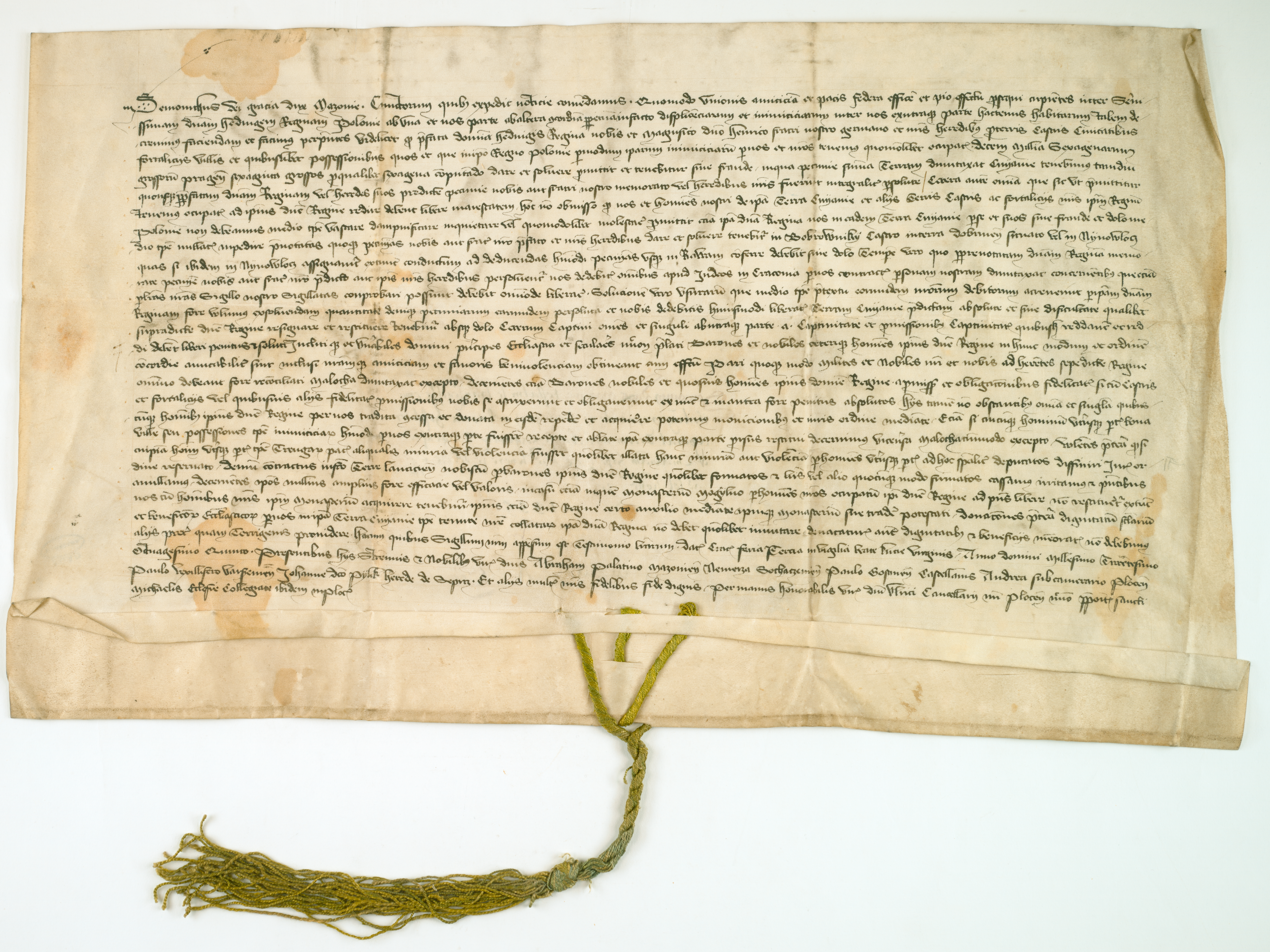
Duke Siemowit negotiating ceasefire with Queen Jadwiga, dated 12 December 1385

The Greater Poland Civil War (Polish: Wojna domowa w Wielkopolsce) refers to the conflict that took place from 1382 to 1385 (Note: Some historians, ex. Nicolle, give Jadwiga's coronation date, 1384, as the end date for this conflict, but in Polish historiography most historians prefer the date 1385, marking the year when Siemowit IV and other feuding Polish lords signed a ceasefire.) in the Greater Poland province of the Kingdom of Poland during the interregnum period following the transition of power between the Piast dynasty, Angevin dynasty, and the Jagiellon dynasty.

Another name for the conflict is the Grzymała–Nałęcz War (Polish: Wojna Grzymalitów z Nałęczami), as a major part of the conflict involved the struggle between the Grzymała and Nałęcz families (clans) for the dominant position in the Greater Poland.

== Civil war ==
The death of Casimir III the Great in 1370 marked the end of the Piast dynasty in Poland. He was succeeded by Louis I of Hungary of the Angevin dynasty, who was Casimir's nephew. Louis' death in 1382, without a male heir, left a power vacuum (interregnum). Although the Privilege of Koszyce stipulated that one of his daughters would succeed him on the Polish throne, Louis' selection of his daughter Mary proved controversial, as her husband, Sigismund of Luxembourg, was not popular in Poland. The different factions in Poland could not agree on the succession, and a conflict erupted. The faction gathered around the Grzymała clan supported Sigismund, while the Nałęcz clan instead favored the Duke of Masovia, Siemowit IV.

As the clans in Greater Poland warred, those in Lesser Poland succeeded in gathering support for a different solution. In 1384, Louis' 10-year-old daughter Jadwiga was crowned King of Poland, upon the condition that the Polish-Hungarian Union was dissolved. Her coronation marked the end of most civil war hostilities; Norman Davies notes that "the disappointed candidates battled each other's candidacy into oblivion". As Jadwiga's fiance, William, Duke of Austria, was also unpopular in Poland, the Lesser Poland faction succeeded in arranging for her to marry Władysław Jagiełło (Jogaila), Grand Duke of Lithuania, in 1386. Jagiełło had just emerged victorious from a civil war in Lithuania. Their marriage began the period of the Polish-Lithuanian Union and the ascension of the Jagiellon Dynasty to the thrones of Poland and Lithuania.

The war is said to have been bloody; Davies writes of "much slaughter", and Sobczak notes that "entire clans perished in it".

== See also ==
- Duchy of Greater Poland
- Warfare in Medieval Poland
