= Tomašanci =

Coordinates: 45°23′09″N 18°24′55″E

- Village (Selo)
- Interactive map of Tomašanci

Tomašanci is a village near Gorjani, Croatia. In the 2011 census, it had 583 inhabitants.
