= Chest of Saint Simeon =

Sarcophagus at the Church of Saint Simeon in Croatia

Coordinates: 44°6′48.2″N 15°13′42.7″E

The Silver Chest of Saint Simeon
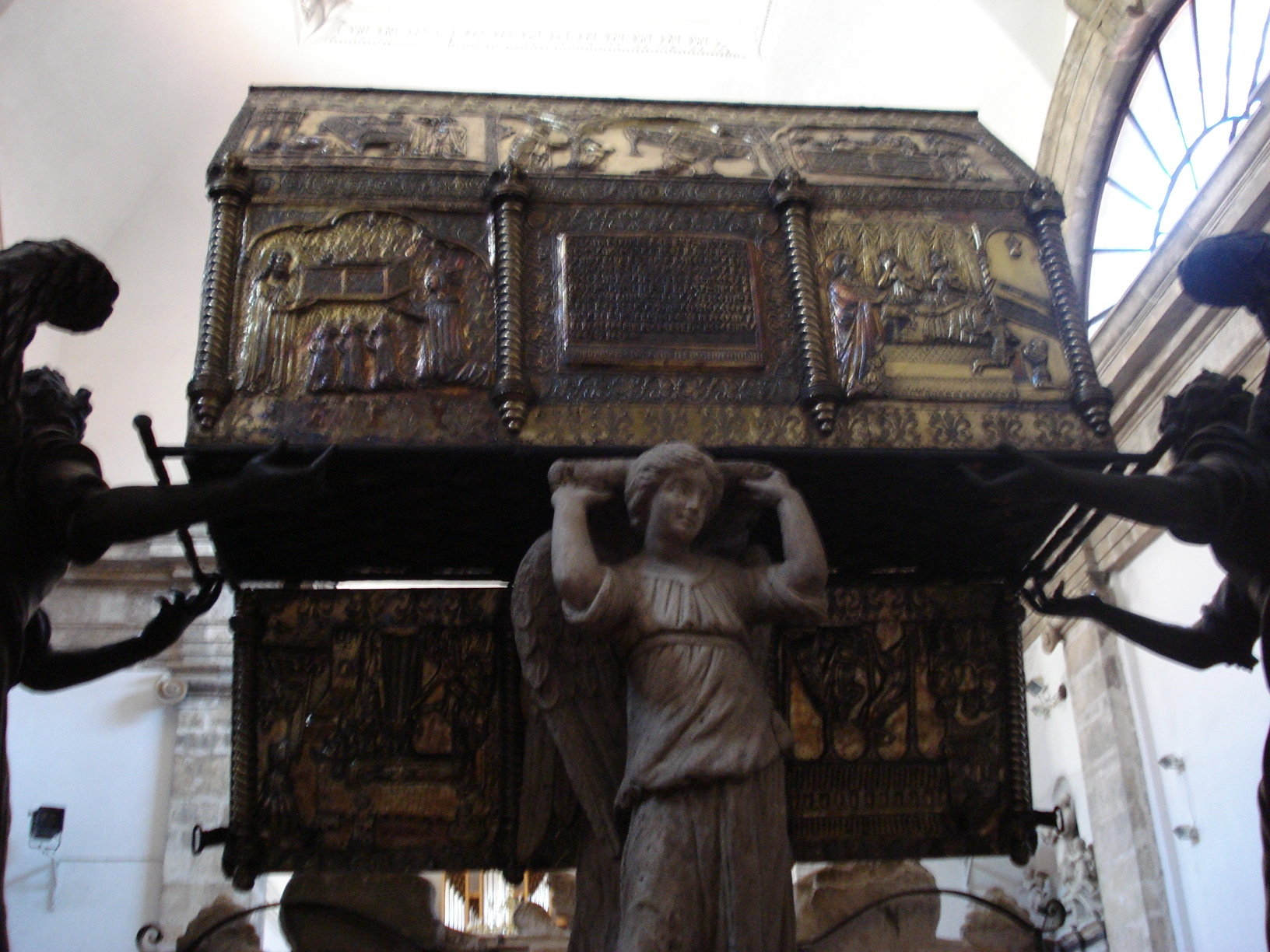
- Original Chest in the Church of St.Simeon in Zadar

Under protection of UNESCO

Description
- Author: Francesco di Antonio da Sesto
- Date: 1377–1380
- Place: Zadar, Croatia
- Techniques: Repoussé Silverwork and Gilding
- Material: Cedarwood
- Dimensions: 1.92×0.625×1.27 metres (6.30×2.05×4.17 ft)
- Location: Trg Šime Budinića, Zadar
- Open for public viewing every year on 8 Oct.

The Chest of Saint Simeon or Saint Simeon's Casket (Croatian: Škrinja sv. Šimuna) is a rectangular cedarwood sarcophagus in the shape of a chasse, overlaid with silver and silver-gilt plaques, said to hold the relics of St Simon the God-receiver; it is located over the main altar in the Church of Saint Simeon in Zadar, Croatia. The chest, considered a masterpiece of medieval art and also a unique monument of the goldsmith's craft of the age, is one of the most interesting works in gold in Europe now under the protection of UNESCO. It was made by local goldsmiths to an Italian design between 1377 and 1380.

The cult of St. Simeon, the story of how the queen stole the finger of Zadar's patron saint, or gonfaloniero as the locals call it, and the donation of a magnificent shrine to atone for the stealing of the saint's finger illustrate not only the political aspect orchestrated by the Angevins amid the people's belief in the authenticity of Zadar's body over the one kept in Venice, but also the high level of development and quality in goldsmithing during the second half of the fourteenth century.

The top of the chest containing the mummified body of the silver-crowned bearded saint enclosed behind a sheet of transparent glass is elevated above the main altar and displayed to the public, as well as its interior full of precious gifts given by Elizabeth of Bosnia, every year on 8 October, at 8:30 a.m. (Note: The embroidering apron in which St. Simeon is dressed was a gift of the Serbian despot Djordje Brankovič.)

== History ==
=== The legend of the chest ===
Eastern Roman emperors who were seated in Constantinople in the sixth century were not only expanding their collection of valuable works of art, but also relics of saints in order to be able to stand side by side with Rome's. So, between 565 and 568 AD the sarcophagus where the remains of St. Simeon were being kept was moved from Syria to Constantinople, (Note: According to some historians, the saint's body was translated from Jerusalem to Constantinople in the second half of the 6th century while others state that it was brought to Constantinople from Syria. The mentioning of the Dubrovnik Cathedral as his first resting place in Dalmatia after his transfer from Palestine also appears in a verse-chronicle of the Ragusan poet Miletius from 1159.) where it stayed until the year 1203 when it was then shipped to Venice. (Note: The surviving Pilgrim’s Book, written by Daniel and Anthony of Novgorod, monk and archbishop of Novgorod, during their visit to Constantinople in 1200, testifies that the relics of the saint were still in Istanbul at the time. Legends relate that his body arrived in Zadar in 1203, 1213, 1243 or 1273 respectively, but despite the many dates and places the theory that the Eastern emperor's nephew Alexius Angelus conspired with Venetians and Frankish crusaders to plounder the city of Zadar on their way to Constantinople in 1201 (Treaty of Venice) may sound quite possible to some researchers once the purpose of the plan was to defray part of the transporting cost of the expedition which the crusaders were unable to pay to Venice. In December 1202 Alexius IV promised aid and money in return for restoration to his throne, so like this the Treaty of Zara was signed in January 1203 and the Fourth Crusade proceeded against Christian Constantinople, despite protests from the Pope because the act represented a brutal assault on a Catholic town by Catholic troops. There is a mosaic in the Basilica of San Giovanni Batista in Ravenna, Italy, that portrays the invasion of Zadar by the crusaders (1208).)

According to tradition, the veneration of St. Simeon at Zadar began after the arrival of a Venetian merchant there who was transporting the relics of the saint in a stone sarcophagus when his ship was caught in a storm off Zadar, on the Dalmatian coast. While the city repaired his ship, he secretly buried the sarcophagus in a cemetery nearby so as to keep it safe from any danger; soon after that he got very ill. He sought refuge at an inn at the head of Zadar's harbour, (Note: This is the place where today stands the parish church of St. John.) where monks began to treat him. Seeing that his medical condition had worsened, they took all of his documents and found an inscription hanging around his neck reporting the miraculous powers of the saint. Oddly enough, that same night, three rectors appeared to them in a dream and warned each one individually that the remains of the holy saint were really buried in that said cemetery. Early in the following morning, as they walked to the site where they expected to find that stone sarcophagus, they told one another about their vision and so realised that they all had shared the same dream. They got to the grave where the chest had been hidden and dug it out of the ground, unaware of the real powers of its content. Shortly after that, gossips about this story reported by the monks and miracles performed in the name of the saint began to spread around the region inciting to the locals to refuse to let his body leave Zadar.

When the remains of St. Simeon first came to Zadar they were deposited in the cemetery of a suburban monastery (Church of the Virgin - Velika Gospa), which later became associated with the city's pilgrims hospice, until they were transferred to the sacristy of the female monastery of St. Mary Major, where they remained until its demolition to make room for the construction of the city walls in 1570. On 16 May 1632 they were transferred once more amid public rejoicing to a church consecrated to St. Stephen, the Martyr, and which subsequently came to be known as the Sanctuary of Saint Simeon the Righteous, the prophet of the Nunc Dimittis. Since then St. Simeon, one of the four patrons of Zadar, has been revered in the city.

=== The theft of the finger ===
In 1371, Elizabeth of Bosnia, daughter of Stephen II, Ban of Bosnia, and Queen of Hungary and Croatia as wife of one of the most powerful European rulers of his time, King Louis I, visited the city of Zadar. (Note: Jelič, however, reported that this event happened during the king's entrance in Zadar and not in 1371.) According to legend, during a religious mass, she furtively cracked off a piece of St. Simeon's finger and hid it in the breast of her dress, where it immediately began to decompose, a process which miraculously reverted itself when she returned the piece to the saint's hand. Confused by the appearing wound on her bosom and without being able to continue up to the point where she could safely exit from the church, most probably because of the maggots that infested the broken piece, she ran blindly through the aisle of the church only to find out that she would soon be morally forced to restore the piece back to its original place under the accusatory and inquisitive glances exchanged by the many noblemen who formed a circle around her.

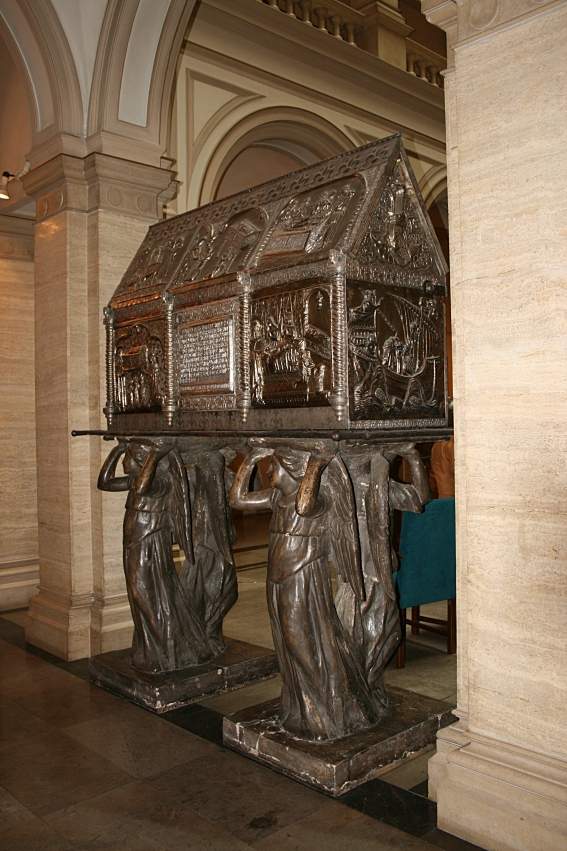
A replica of the chest as seen in the Croatian Academy of Sciences and Arts

When Elizabeth finally left the church she promised to honour the saint by presenting the church with a gift ornated in gold that she later came to commission to the Milanese goldsmith Francesco di Antonio da Sesto (Francis of Milan), who was asked to create a paper model with drawings of all the details to be discussed and approved by the queen's representatives so that their legibility and presentation might be in accordance with the royal expectations and deep interest in the making of such precious shrine. The intricate carvings were dexterously executed between 1377 and 1380 and was assisted by Andrija Markov from Zagreb, Petar Blažev from Reča, Stejpan Pribičev and Mihovil Damjanov. (Note: Although Francis of Milan could have taken on assistants because of the urgency of the job, it is known today from documents that he only took on only one apprentice and one trained goldsmith who was engaged at the end of the work.) (Note: The commission of the chest by Elizabeth is recorded in a document dated 5 July 1377 in Zadar. It reveals the techniques used in the making of the chest and also attests that the donation of the 240 kg of silver used to decorate the surface of the chest came from "Elizabeta" herself. It was most probably given to Zadar because the Royal couple needed the support of its people. Even being the commissioning of reliquary shrines a typical way by which medieval queens attempted to secure their political recognition, it was the period when the city frequently belonged to the Venetian Empire and the territory of the Croatian-Hungarian king. Thus Louis I, engaged in keeping Zadar away from the clutches of Venice, wanted a strong community to form a strong bond between the south Italian possessions and the Polish and Croatian-Hungarian state. For this reason, St. Simeon was the best choice for being the most popular saint in Zadar. But the Angevin chapter of Zadar's history, which began in 1350, ended in 1409 when Ladislaus of Naples, the descendant of Elizabeth the Cuman, sold Zadar and its duchy to the Venetian Republic.)

=== Recent events ===
In 2007 the Archbishop of Zadar and the Greek Orthodox Patriarch of Jerusalem agreed that the Archdiocese would provide a piece of the body of the saint to the Patriarchate of Jerusalem to be venerated in the Church of the Katamon Monastery of St. Simeon. Arrangements were made with the Congregation of Divine Worship and Cult of Saints in Rome and the small silver reliquary, constraining a particle measuring 5 x 2.5 cm and bearing the Latin inscription: "Ex corporis Sancti Simeoni Iusti Zadar 7. octobris 2010", was solemnly handed over to the representatives of the Orthodox Church during the celebration of Vespers in the eastern part of the historic quarters of Zadar.

== Description of the chest ==
=== Dimensions ===
The rectangular silver chest of Saint Simeon, standing 2.3 m above the ground on the main altar of the church of the same name, measures 1.92 m long by 62.5 cm wide and, including the 56 cm high saddle-shaped lid, 1.27 m high. The front side of the lid is dominated by the carved reclining figure of the saint dressed in a gown and cloak richly ornamented with plant motifs made by punching fastened on his breast by a clasp. The front panel, which unfolds by means of hinges located on the bottom displaying the saint's laid-down figure, measures 66.5 cm high. It is raised by the outstretched arms of four bronze angels forged from seventeenth century Turkish cannons that were seized in the waters of Zadar in 1648. Covered inside and outside with a thin lamina of 240 kg of pure silver and also a considerable quantity of gold, it shows intricate details carved on the cedar wood used to give shape to the chest. All free surface of the chest is filled in with more or less standard vine, leaves and winding rosettes of sinuate leaves ornamentations decorated with gold.

=== Relief compositions ===
The front part of the chest displays enhanced relief compositions depicting scenes from the saint's early years as a preacher, death and ascension into heaven on the back of a virgin, as well as biblical and historical events of his time. The inside part contains a relief made by goldsmith Stjepan Martinič of Zadar representing the patron saints of the city in the background. The inside of the lid is magnificently illustrated with three miracles attributed to the saint. His holy monk-like figure and two sets of the arms of Anjou also appear in high relief on both the triangle areas of the lid. They are both richly decorated in the same manner together with the shield of Hungarian bars and the characteristic Angevin fleur-de-lis, a cloak and a helmet with a crown. Above the crowns rises an ostrich with outspread wings and a horseshoe in its beak. Around the coat of arms there are reliefs of acanthus leaves, and beside them the initials of the king: L.R. (Latin: Lodovicus Rex). (Note: The same coat of arms in the shape of a buckle can be found in the treasury of Aachen Cathedral once Ludvig I was the grandson of Charles Martel, the son of Charles II of Naples.)

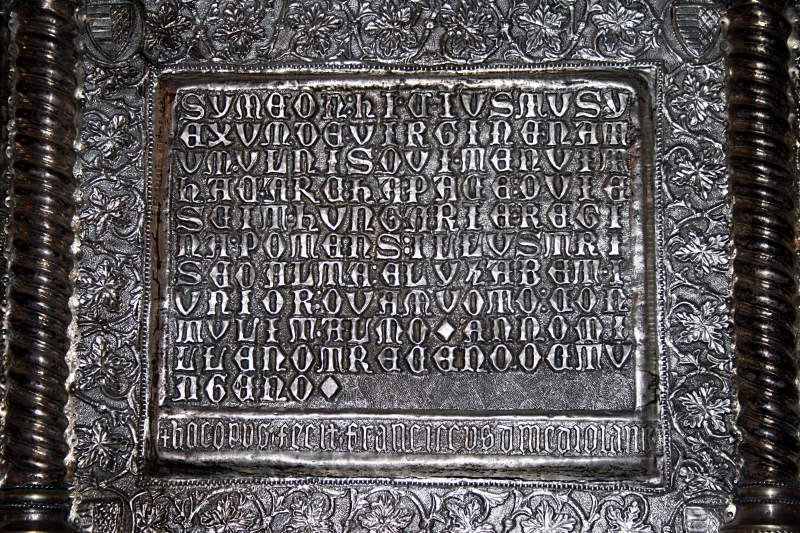
The Latin inscription.

The Latin inscription on the central panel on the back of the chest, which corresponds to the main composition on the front panel, bears the goldsmith's signature with Louis's coat of arms in the corners of the richly worked vine tracery that complements the relief. It is divided in two parts, being the larger with the main inscription in Gothic capital letters beaten in high relief: "SYMEON: HI.C.IVSTVS.YEXVM.DE.VIRGINE.NATVM.VLNIS: QVI.TENVITHAC.ARCHA. PACE.QVIESCIT.HVNGARIE.REGINA.POTENS: ILLVSTRIS: ED.ALTA: ELYZABET.IUNIOR:QVAM.VOTO:CONTVLIT. ALMO.ANNO.MILLENO: TRECENO: OCTVAGENO." Below, engraved in stylized minuscule letters, appears the goldsmith's signature: "hoc.opus.fecit: franciscus.d.mediolano."

Known in medieval Latin hexameters, the translation of the inscription reads as follows: "Simeon the Righteous, holding Jesus, born of a virgin, in his arms, rests in peace in this chest, commissioned by the Queen of Hungary, mighty, glorious and majestic Elizabeth the Younger, in the year 1380. This is the work of Francis of Milan".

=== Main scenes ===
The scenes are separated by columns surmounted by small heads of angels sculpted during the two-year restoration process started in 1630. The work was conducted by the goldsmiths Constantino Piazzalonga of Venice and Benedetto Libani of Zadar, who reduced the length of the chest by four and the width by three fingers. (Note: The art historian Rudolf Eitelberger wrote in his 1861 work Die mittelalterlieben Kunstdenkenmale Dalmatiens that the chest had been restored during the Renaissance.)

Compositions located on the front side of the chest.
- The Arrival of King Louis I in Zadar, the right scene on the front panel depicting the town walls, gates and ramparts, includes a Romanesque cloister beside a church, a contemporary ship in a storm and several figures clad in garments with caps typical of the period. Louis I triumphantly enters the Zadar harbour dressed in ceremonial robes escorting the shrine, which is being carried in the middleground, after relieving the city from an eighteen-month siege. To the left of the king are five figures kneeling humbly and above them the short-bearded figure of Archbishop Nikola Matafar blessing the king. (Note: From a historical point of view, this is the most interesting piece of work as it interprets an almost contemporary event to the making of the chest. The returning of the saint's body to the place from which the Venetians had probably removed him during their ten-year-long rule, although this information is not confirmed in historical sources.)
- The Presentation in the Temple, the central relief on the front panel, is one depicting St. Simeon taking into his arms the infant Jesus under a four-squared-column ciborium. To the left stands Joseph holding a pigeon, and to the right the prophetess Anne holding an unrolled scroll in her left hand. (Note: The central relief on the front of the chest, is believed to be a work based on a fresco by Giotto, in the Scrovegni Chapel (Cappella dell'Arena) in Padua, or it might be a work based on another of Giotto's smaller paintings today in the Gardner Museum in Boston. This way Francis of Milan introduced the work of this grand master to Dalmatia.)
- The Discovery of the Saint's Body, the scene on the left-hand side of the frontal panel shows a group of three rectors on the left bottom corner. The first has lifted a forefinger while the central figure has raised two, one in each hand. The third is pointing his left thumb over his shoulder at the other monks exhuming the body of the saint. The left monk swings a hoe above his head while the central figure kneels and holds a lantern, which shows that the scene takes place at night. The third monk is kneeling and taking care of the saint's naked body. (Note: Writers agree that this composition depicts the finding of St. Simeon's body in a cemetery of a Zadar suburban monastery.)

Compositions located on the right and left sides of the chest.
- The Boat in the Storm is the scene on the right shorter side of the chest, by the saints feet, where the drama of a situation showing high waves bearing the sides of a large sailing ship and sailors jettisoning goods overboard is very expressively shown. It is believed that it interprets the story of how the bones of St. Simeon came to Zadar. A monstrous horned demon is clutching one of the two masts of the ship while two rushed sailors desperately try to fasten the sail. One has climbed up the mast and is taking a rope which the other is passing over to him. A third sailor is throwing a bundle of merchandise in the sea while the captain, on an elevated stern holding the helm, gives orders to the sailors. The frightened passengers are gathered on the center of the ship. (Note: This is an artistically important motif for also being reminiscent of Giovanni di Balduccio's stone relief on the sarcophagus of St. Eustorgius in Milan. Older writers have the opinion that this scene is a despiction of the boat that brought the saint's relics to Zadar and that it tells the legend of Margaret of Durazzo, wife of Duke Charles of Durazzo, Ludvig's relative, who took part of the saint's body and tried to leave Naples, but the boats which were to take them and their suite could not sail out of the harbour.)
- The Theft of the Finger is the scene located beneath the other coat of arms, on the shorter side of the chest, by the saint's head. It has been interpreted in many ways because of the large number of figures represented. A stylized building symbolizing a church where the scene takes place and a large group of people ornately dressed around a woman similarly dressed with her left hand pointing to her bosom dominate the center of this composition. A point-bearded nobleman of long hair in very nice attire stands beside her and another with a cloak over his clothes seems to point to the door while he looks at the woman standing by the chest. Around them, other nobles with long plumes in their caps show signs of great surprise. In the right bottom, the saint's chest with its lid open and a woman dressed in the same way appears holding a wide finger in her hand. (Note: Older writers say that this scene shows Elizabeta stealing one of St. Simeon's fingers in order to have a male heir. St. Simeon was frequently invoked for couples wishing to have a boy and the belief of stealing the finger of a saint dates at least from the time of the hagiographer Gregory of Tours. Ancient Romans consecrated every joint of the fingers of both hands to a saint and St. Simeon figures as the first joint of the middle finger of the left hand.)

Compositions located on the back part of the chest.
- The Death of Ban Kotromanić is a two-part scene where the Queen's father appears on his deathbed with St. Simeon and a boy invoking aid in the foreground. Beyond him lies the bed with the sick man and two women, who can only be seen from their waist up, standing in front of a curtain. Another boy is shown on the right with his hands clasped in prayer. (Note: As the Queen's father was a Bosnian Ban, and Bosnian rulers were often accused of the Bogumil heresy, writers say that this scene is meant to show that he was a good Catholic and that the two boys represent the Ban's nephews Tvrtko and Vuk, who came to Zadar to entreat the saint to protect their uncle. Other writers suggest that both boys personify only the eldest of the two, who was crowned King of Bosnia and Serbia in October 1377.)
- Queen Elizabeth with her daughters presenting the chest to the saint is the scene which appears to the left of the Latin inscription and that shows Elizabeth ceremoniously dressed in a long cloak edged with a decorated band and a fur collar that wraps her entire body and feet. Her three daughters, Catherine, Mary and Hedwig, are shown more simply dressed looking at the saint with their hands clasped in prayer. (Note: Catherine (1370-1378) was seven years old, Mary (1371-1395) six and Hedwig (1373-1399) almost four at the time of the commissioning of the chest, so this relief must have been finished when Elizabeth's eldest daughter was still alive.)

Compositions located on the inside part of the front panel.
- The Possessed Nobleman is the first of the three miracles carved on the internal surface of the front panel, which opens in order to show the saint's body. It is depicted in two parts, with the first showing a young man with no beard and an older one with long hair and a beard, simply dressed and tightly holding a nobleman possessed by a demon, who is coming out of his mouth. In the second scene the younger man is kneeling with clasped hands thanking the saint for the healing.
- The Young Boy's Resurrection, the second scene, shows a small boat on a stormy sea and a man in it with a long hair and beard, and a tall cap on his head, rescuing a young boy out of the sea with a hook on a long staff. The second part of the scene shows a woman in a long cloak with her head covered laying the drowned boy on the chest. The same boy, brought back to life, can be seen kneeling with his hands clasped in the bottom left corner of the relief. (Note: These figures showing the same boy were not connected in literature and therefore were first wrongly described as two miracles instead of only one, however all three characters bear the same features, hair and attire in this composition.)
- The Preaching of a Heretic Priest, depicting the third miracle performed by the saint, is a scene in which a priest is shown in a pulpit under two pictures. The first is an illustration of Christ in the grave and the second the Virgin holding the infant Jesus. He is holding an open book in his left hand and pointing to the picture of the Virgin with his right. A great part of the surface of this relief is taken up by a large bed where the same priest is lying, naked as was the costume at the time. A bench and a curtain in the background compose the scene. Behind the bed stands St. Simeon raising a sword with his right hand. (Note: This scene has been interpreted as the preaching of the priest who attacked some religious teaching concerning the Virgin, so St. Simeon appeared in his dream with a sword and threatened him, so steering him to the right path of life.)

Compositions located on the back of the lid.
- The Prejurer is one of the three scenes on the back of the lid. It depicts a building with arches on the ground floor and a man dressed in a long and wide coat falling beside it. To the right of the chest, a group of eight men are shown. The first of the two m an who appear entirely described, is touching the lid of the chest with his right hand while his left is held around the other who has clasped his hands. The bust of a third also appears, but only the crown of the remaining five heads are shown. A priest is shown watching the group. (Note: According with some writers, this composition shows either some false oath or a sacrilege committed by that man.)
- The Goldsmith is the central composition and shows only three figures. A man kneeling on one leg before the saint's chest on posts with goldsmith's tools in his hand. He is looking at a bald-headed younger man kneeling by a column and a female figure with her head covered and wrapped in a long cloak is shown standing in front of an arch. (Note: The content of this relief has not been well explained. The figure kneeling by the post seems to represent the goldsmith working in the church who appears surprised by the arrival of the young man accompanied by the woman.)
- The Miracle with the Leg is the right-hand scene which depicts a group of four priests gathered behind the chest and a fifth at its right holding one of the saints legs with his right arm and the other raised up to his chin. (Note: This composition is considered by some writers to also represent the punishment of a prejurer whose sin was to become a madman for the stealing of the saint's leg, which miraculously grew together with the body again after being sent back to Zadar.)

Note: The visual narrative of The Theft of the Finger and two other scenes located on the back part of the chest have recently been considered to be all connected. Such conclusion may differ from another line of thoughts who point to a longer narrative based on a chronological sequence of events, which begins with the scene The Boat in the Storm, shifts from visual to written discourse in the reading of the Latin inscription on the back panel, and ends in the complementary scene The Death of Ban Kotromanić.

== Gallery ==
Relief compositions depicted on the Chest of Saint Simeon
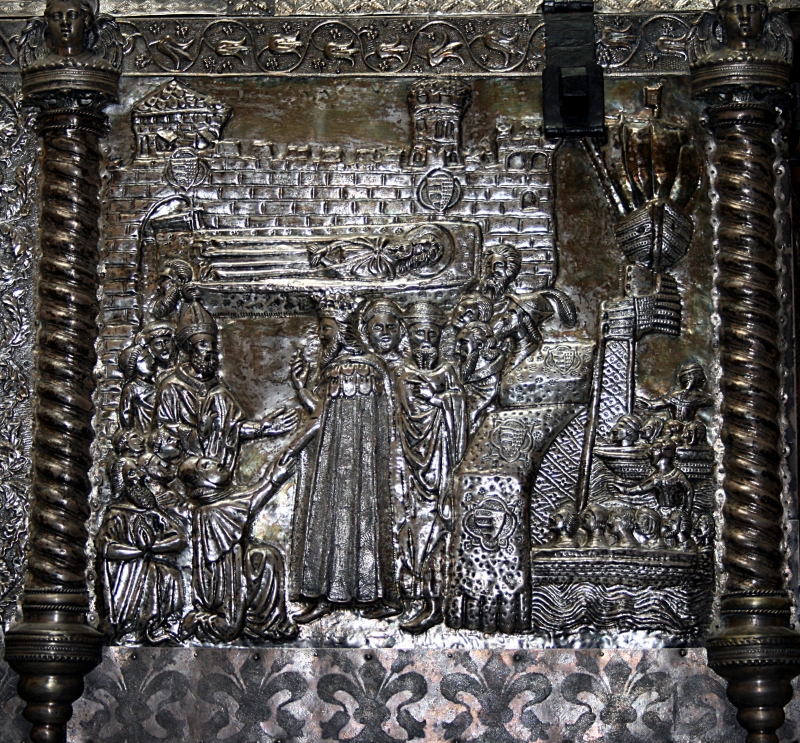
Zadar's town walls and gates are seen here close to the Church of St. Mary the Great, in which the body of St. Simeon laid until 1570 and after which the gate was named.

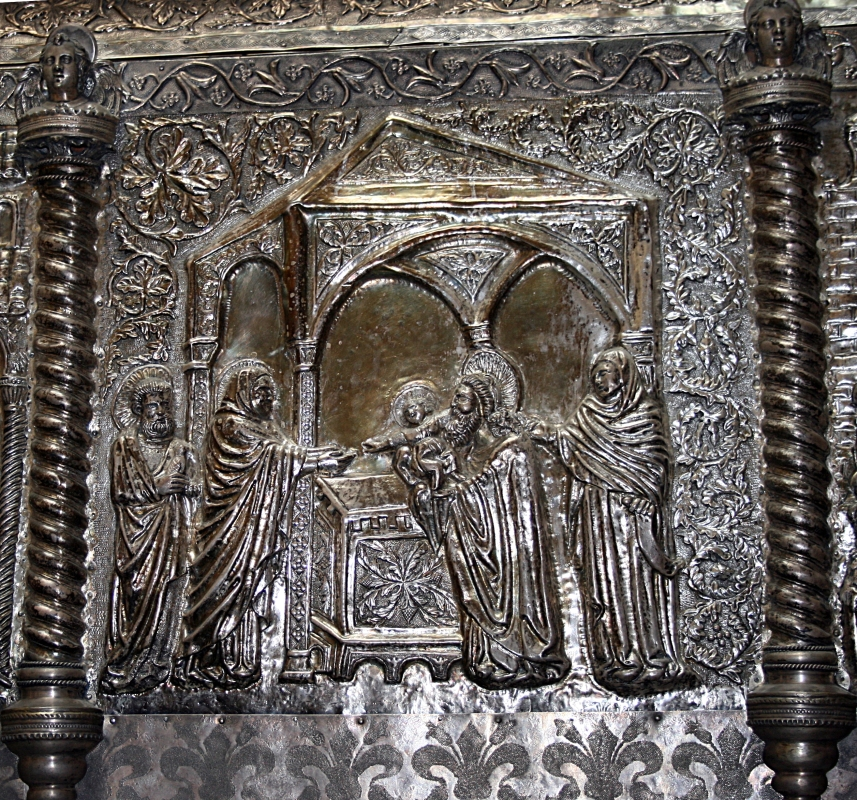
The carving of the relief The Presentation in the Temple is expressively mentioned in the contract for the chest.

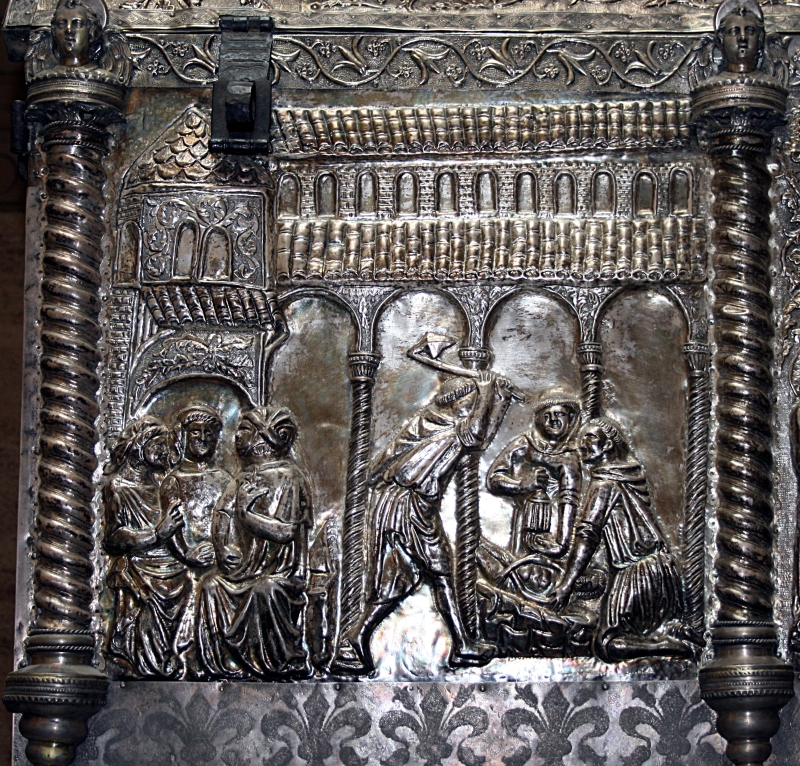
The gesture of the monk pointing over his shoulder is identical to that of the Virgin showing St. Francis to baby Jesus on a fresco by Pietro Lorenzetti in the Basilica of San Francesco d'Assisi.

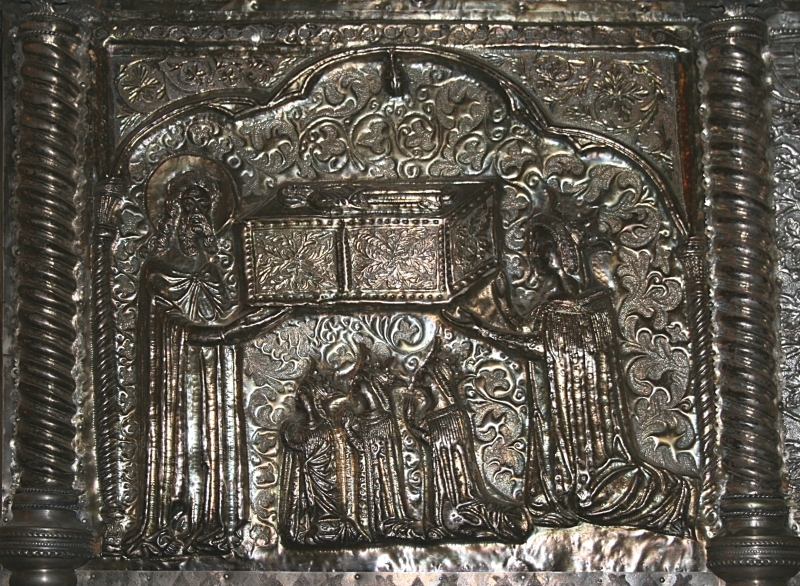
According to the legend, Elizabeth went to the church accompanied by her three daughters to pay homage to the saint and also fulfill her vows as for the king's entry in Zadar in 1358.

== See also ==
- Capetian House of Anjou
- House of Kotromanić
- Treaty of Zadar

== Sources ==
- Radovinovič, Radovan (1998). The Croatian Adriatic, Naklada Naprijed, pp. 169–170. ISBN 953-178-097-8
- Kokole, S. (2008). The Silver Shrine of Saint Simeon in Zadar: Collecting Ancient Coins and Casts after the Antique in Fifteenth-Century Dalmatia, History of Art Studies. ISSN 0091-7338
- Bak, J.M. (1986). Roles and Functions of Queens in Arpadian and Angevin Hungary (1000-1386 A.D.), Medieval Queenship (ed) New York. ISBN 0-312-05217-0

Attribution

- This article incorporates information translated from the corresponding article of the Croatian Wikipedia. A list of contributors can be found there at the History section.
