= Novigrad Castle =

Novigrad Castle (Fortica)
- Novigrad, Zadar County, Croatia
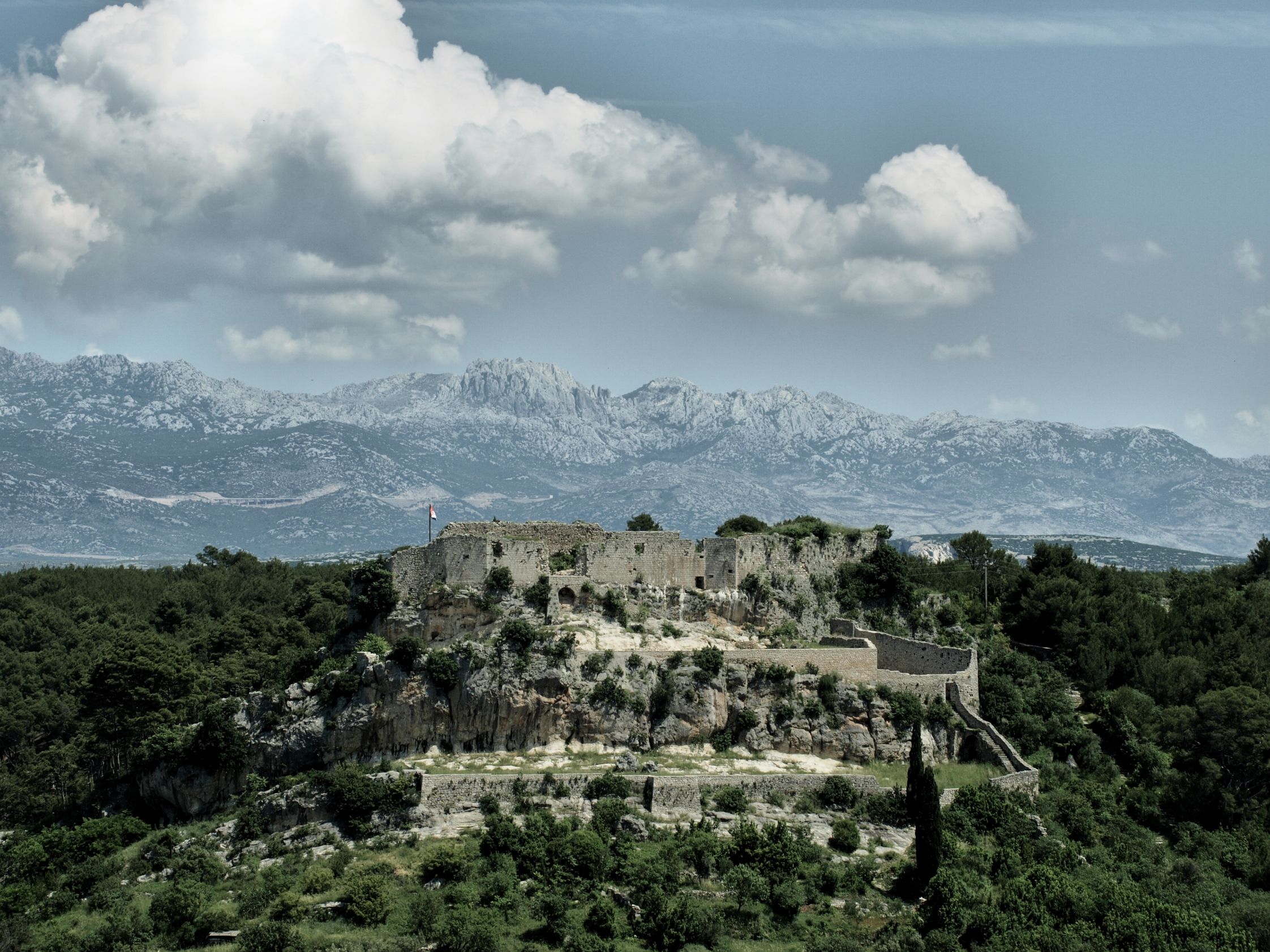
- Novigrad Castle as seen from the Novigrad plateau

Site information
- Type: Hilltop castle
- Open to the public: yes
- Condition: Ruins

Location
- Coordinates: 44.1839°N 15.554°E

Site history
- Built: 1220
- Built by: Kurjaković family

Cultural Good of Croatia
- Type: Protected cultural good
- Reference no.: Z-4198

Novigrad Castle, locally called "Fortica" is a ruined hilltop castle above village of Novigrad in Zadar County, Croatia.

== History ==
It is considered that during the Bronze Age, a Liburnian hillfort existed on the site of today's castle. The area was subsequently conquered by Romans and became part of their state, until the fall of the Roman Empire in 476. It was subsequently controlled by the Ostrogoths, until emperor Justinian's reconquista. In the aftermath of Aachen peace of 812, the place came under control of Croats who made it a place of strategic significance.

The castle itself was built in 1220 by reconstructing an older Roman fortification, therefore the complex was named "Castrum novum", or "Novigrad" (The New Castle). By the late 1282, Juraj Gusić Kurjaković, count of Krbava erected new fortifications and had the castle thoroughly reinforced. Their purpose was to protect his possessions around Novigrad. During the feudal power struggles of late 14th century called "The anti-court movement", in 1386 the Hungarian-Croatian sovereign Mary and her mother Elizabeth of Bosnia, were imprisoned in the castle. Elizabeth was eventually strangled by her captors. By 1409, the area became part of the Republic of Venice. The Venetians built additional fortifications. During the Venetian management, the castle was used as a residence of Venetian governor (provveditore). During the Cretan war, the Ottoman Empire briefly managed to capture the Novigrad Castle, only to be reclaimed again by the Venetians in 1647. The Venetian rule over this area continued until the end of the Republic in 1797.

During the Croatian War of Independence, the wider area of Novigrad was fiercely contested during Operation Maslenica in January and February 1993. SVK's 7th North Dalmatian corps bolstered by elite Serbian Volunteer Guards (Arkan's Tigers) fought ferocious battles against Croatian Guards Brigades and special operations units with Serbs breaking the Croatian lines only to be pushed back by Croatian counterattacks.

== Gallery ==
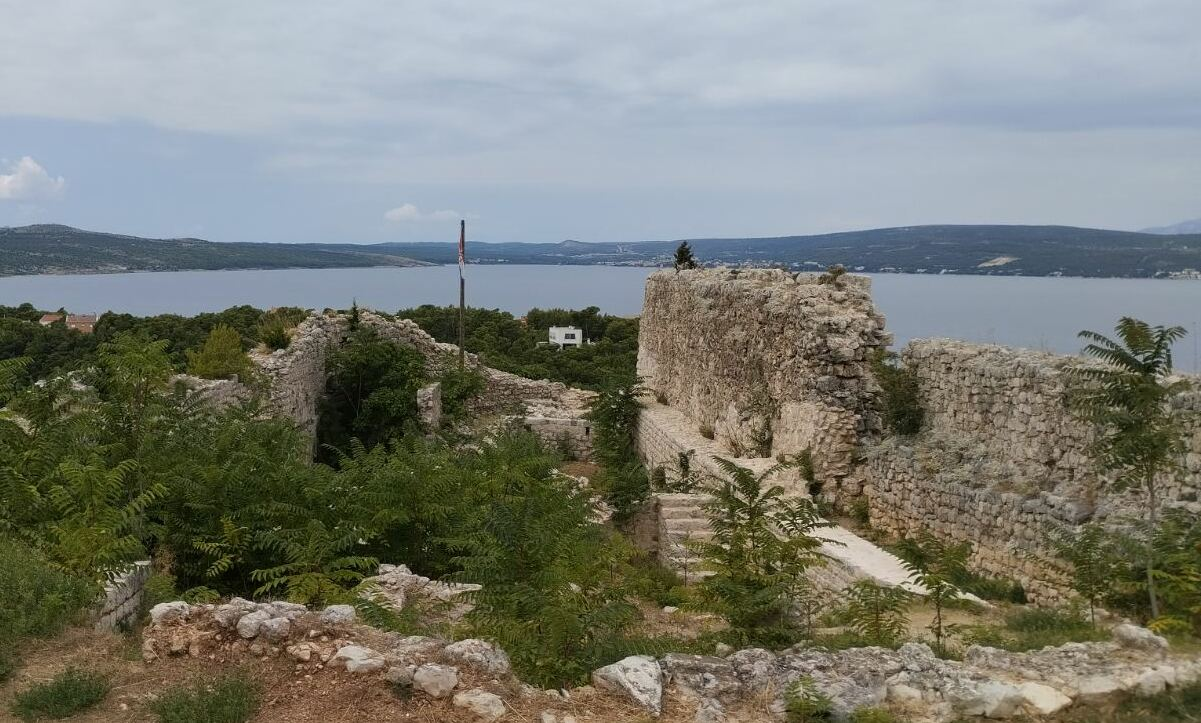
The upper part of the castle.

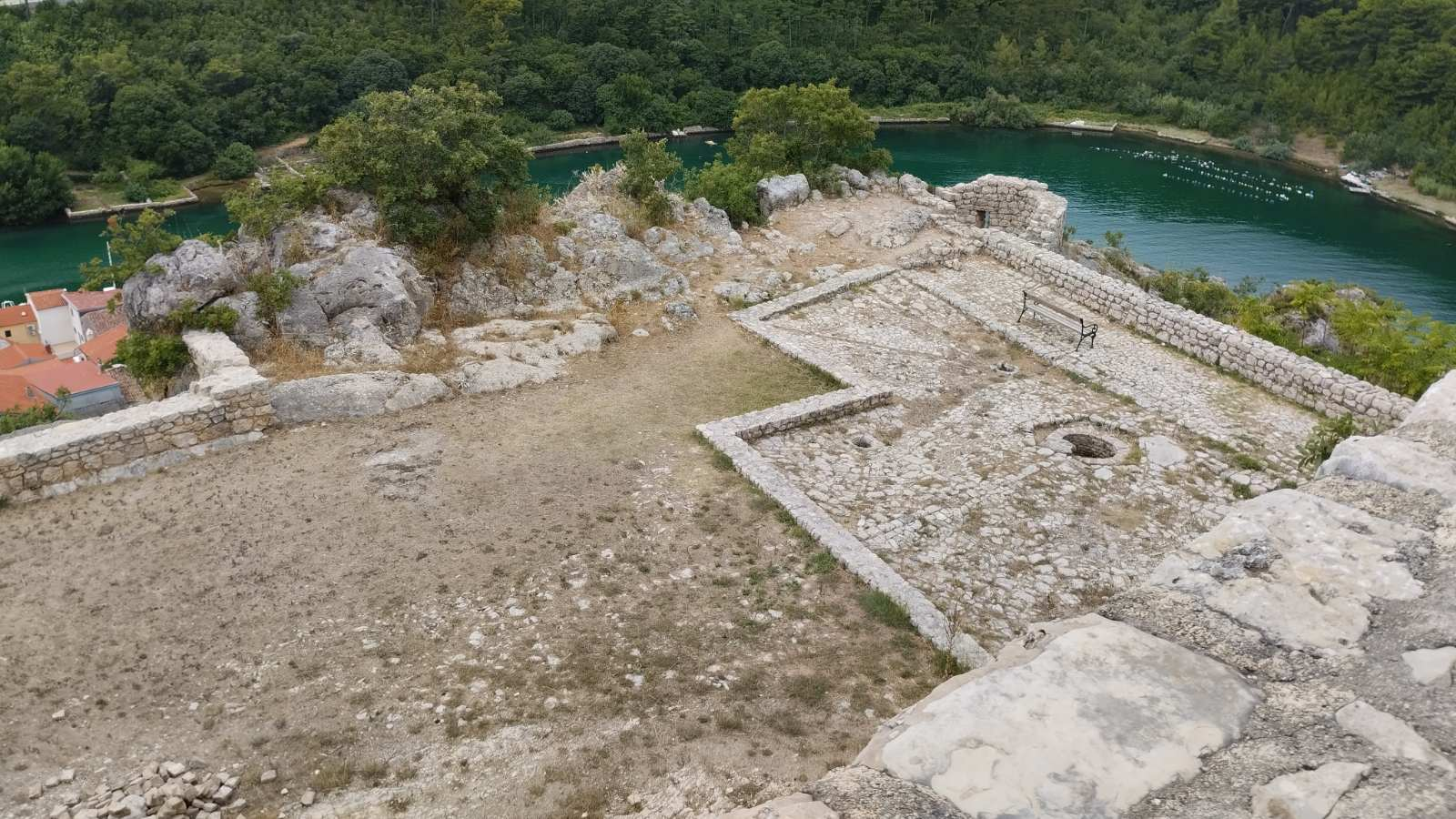
A view towards the lower part of the castle.
