= Simeon (Gospel of Luke) =

1st century prophet of the New Testament

Saint Simeon
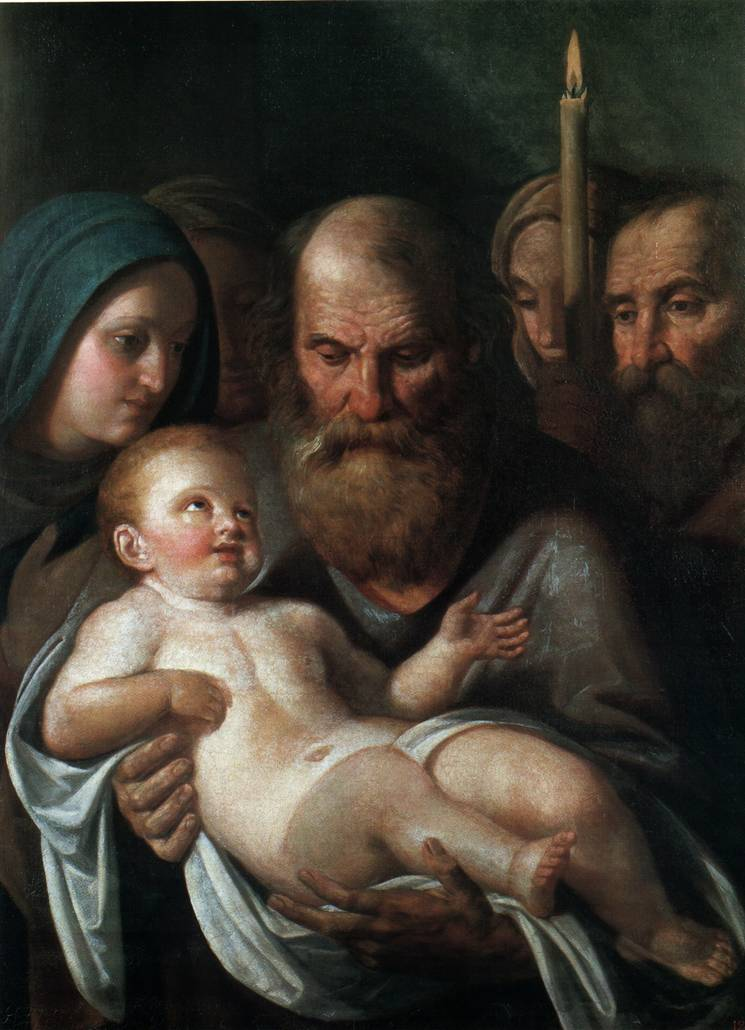
- Simeon the Godreceiver by Alexei Yegorov, 1830s–40s

Prophet Righteous, God-Receiver
- Venerated in: Eastern Orthodox Church; Oriental Orthodox Church; Catholic Church; Anglican Communion; Lutheranism
- Major shrine: Church of St. Simeon in Zadar, Croatia
- Feast: 3 February; 8 October
- Attributes: Depicted as an elderly man, sometimes vested as a Jewish priest, often holding the infant Jesus
- Patronage: Zadar, Croatia

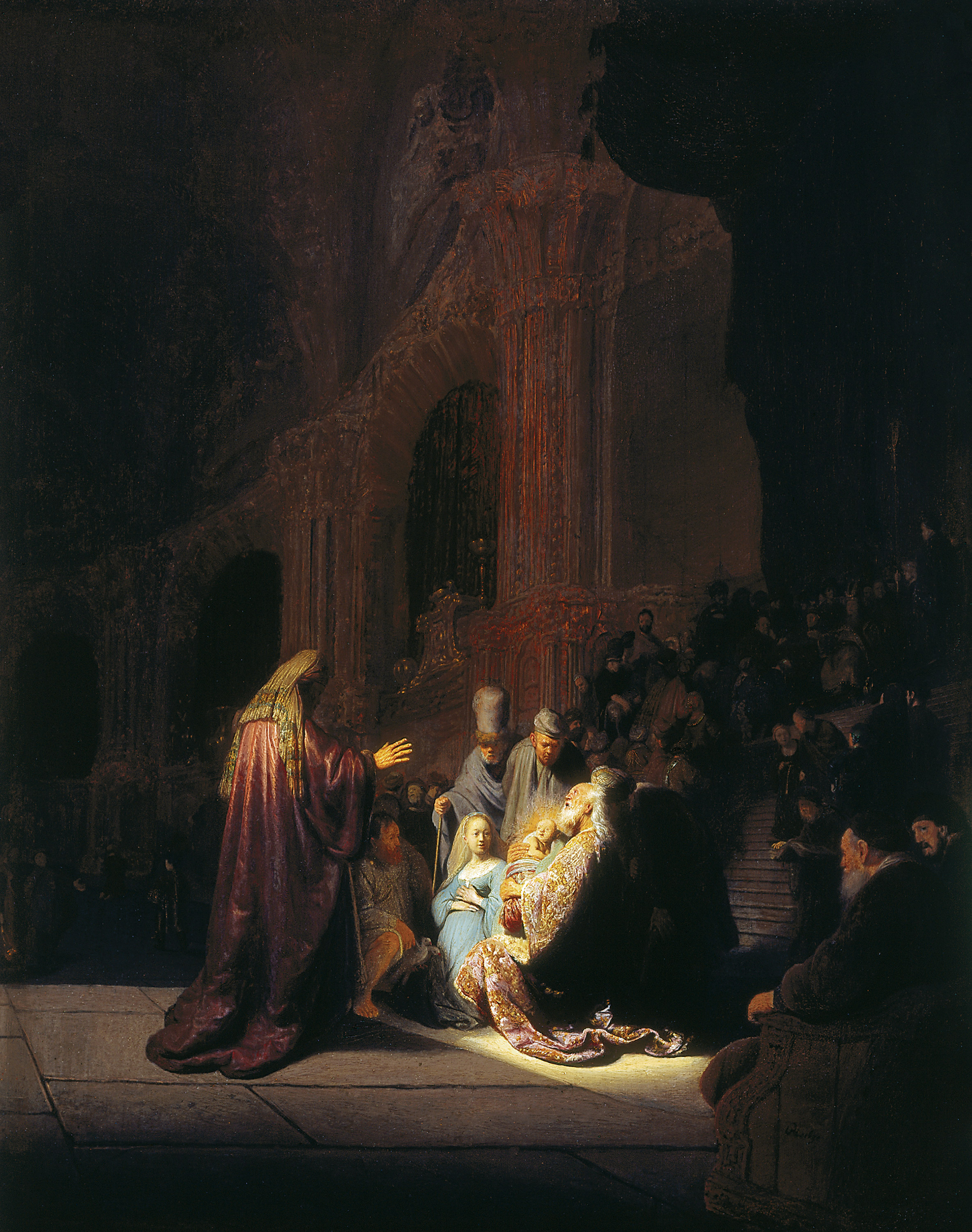
Simeon in the Temple, by Rembrandt van Rijn, 1631

Simeon (Greek: Συμεών) at the Temple is the "just and devout" man of Jerusalem who, according to Luke 2 (Luke 2:25–35), met Mary, Joseph, and Jesus as they entered the Temple to fulfill the requirements of the Law of Moses on the 40th day from Jesus' birth, i.e. the presentation of Jesus at the Temple.

According to the Biblical account, the Holy Spirit visited Simeon and revealed to him that he would not die until he had seen the Christ of God. Upon taking Jesus into his arms, he uttered a prayer which is still used liturgically as the Latin Nunc dimittis in the Catholic Church and other Christian churches, and gave a prophecy alluding to the Crucifixion of Jesus.

Some Christian traditions commemorate this meeting on 2 February as the feast of Candlemas, or, more formally, the Presentation of the Lord, the Meeting of the Lord, or the Purification of the Virgin (Mary). His prophecy is involved in the devotion to Mary as Our Lady of Sorrows. Simeon is venerated as a saint in the Catholic Church, Lutheranism, Anglican Communion, Eastern Orthodox Church and Oriental Orthodoxy. His feast is commemorated on 3 February in the revised Roman Martyrology of the Catholic Church and on 16 February (Julian Calendar) in the Serbian Orthodox Church, by some families celebrating him as their patron saint.

== New Testament ==
The sole mention in the New Testament of Simeon is thus:

Now there was a man in Jerusalem, whose name was Simeon, and this man was righteous and devout, looking for the consolation of Israel, and the Holy Spirit was upon him. And it had been revealed to him by the Holy Spirit that he should not see death before he had seen the Lord's Christ. And inspired by the Spirit he came into the temple; and when the parents brought in the child Jesus, to do for him according to the custom of the law, he took him up in his arms and blessed God and said, "Lord, now let your servant depart in peace, according to your word; for my eyes have seen your salvation which you have prepared in the presence of all peoples, a light for revelation to the Gentiles, and for glory to your people Israel." And his father and his mother marveled at what was said about him; and Simeon blessed them and said to Mary his mother, "Behold, this child is set for the fall and rising of many in Israel, and for a sign that is spoken against (and a sword will pierce through your own soul also), that thoughts out of many hearts may be revealed." - Luke 2:25–35, RSV-2CE

Some writers have identified this Simeon with Shimon ben Hillel, although Hillel was not a priest. James F. Driscoll, writing in the Catholic Encyclopedia, dismisses this as "untrustworthy legends".

== In Christian tradition ==
=== Title ===
- Simeon the God-Receiver in Eastern Orthodoxy (Greek: Συμεὼν ὁ Θεοδόχος, romanized: Simeon Theodochos, Church Slavonic: Симеон Богоприимец, romanized: Simeon Bogopriimets).
- Simeon senex (Simeon the old man) occurs in some Latin texts and hagiographies.
- Aged Simeon in poetry and music, including the Candlemas anthem "When Mary to the Temple Went" by Johannes Eccard (1533–1611).
- Simeon, without any title, is normally used by Protestants.

=== Age ===
The Bible is silent about Simeon's age at this point, though he is generally assumed (for example by Ian Howard Marshall, who refers to him as an "old man") to have been elderly.

Orthodox tradition says that he was one of the seventy scholars who translated the Hebrew Scriptures into the Septuagint, and that he translated Isaiah 7:14 as saying "a young woman" would conceive rather than "a virgin" due to his disbelief. Because of this, a divine being told him he would live to see the fulfillment of this prophecy. When he was around 360 years old, he saw Jesus, uttered the benediction and died.

=== Relics ===
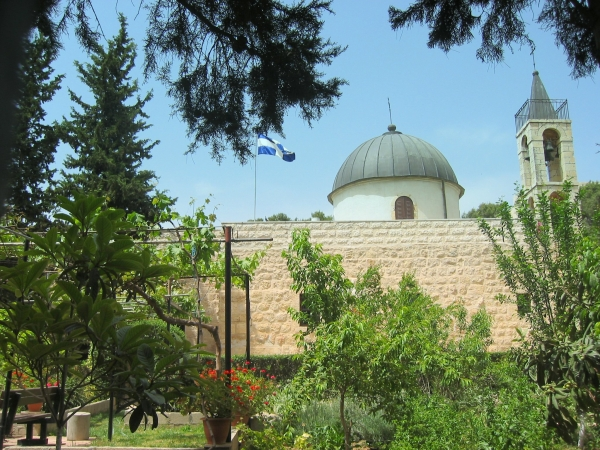
St. Simeon Monastery, Katamon, Jerusalem

Sometime between 565 and 578 AD, a body believed to be that of Simeon was translated from Syria or Jerusalem to Constantinople. Sometime around the Siege of Constantinople (1203) the relics were seized and shipped to Venice; however, a storm forced the ship to put in to the port of Zadar on the Dalmatian coast. The relics were first placed in the Velika Gospa (Church of the Virgin) and then later translated to the Church of St. Stephen, which became known as the Sanctuary of St. Simeon the Godbearer. Simeon is one of the four patron saints of Zadar; his feast day is celebrated on 8 October. In October 2010, Archbishop Želimir Puljić of Zadar conveyed a small silver reliquary containing some of Simeon's relics to Archbishop Theofylactus of Jordan, representing Theophilos III, the Greek Orthodox Patriarch of Jerusalem, for the monastery of St. Simeon the Godbearer in Jerusalem.

== Festal observances ==
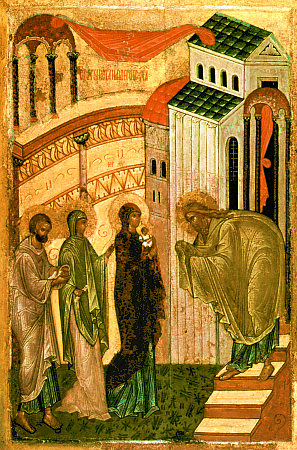
The Meeting of Our Lord (Russian icon, 15th century)

The events in the life of Simeon the Righteous are observed on both 2 and 3 February. The observances of the first day memorialize the act of Mary undergoing an act of ritual purification and presenting Jesus, her child, to the Temple, a feast known as the Presentation of Jesus at the Temple. Because this day focuses on Jesus and Mary, the observation of 3 February is specific to Simeon, who was allowed to die after seeing the Christ born of a virgin.

=== Feast of the Purification of the Blessed Virgin Mary ===
Under Mosaic law, a mother who had given birth to a man-child was considered unclean for seven days; moreover she was to remain for three and 30 days "in the blood of her purification", for a total of 40 days. The Christian Feast of the Purification therefore corresponds to the day on which Mary, according to Jewish law (see Leviticus 12:2–8), should have attended a ceremony of ritual purification. The Gospel of Luke 2:22–39 relates that Mary was purified according to the religious law, after which Jesus was presented in the Temple in Jerusalem. This explains the formal names of the feast.

In the liturgy of Evening Prayer in the Anglican Communion, Anglicans recite the Nunc dimittis or sing it in Evensong in the canticle the Song of Simeon, traditionally every evening. The liturgical hour of Compline of the Catholic Church and of Vespers in Orthodoxy also use it. Many notable composers have set the Nunc dimittis to music, e.g. the (All-Night Vigil of Rachmaninoff).

The feast of 2 February is often known as "Candlemas" because, in honor of the ritual purification of the Virgin Mary, candles of beeswax, which will be used for the whole liturgical year, are brought into a church and blessed. In the Catholic Church the Presentation is commemorated as the fourth Joyful Mystery of the Rosary. In the Church of England the Presentation of Christ in the Temple is a principal feast. In the Eastern Orthodox Church it is one of the twelve Great Feasts.

=== 2 February ===
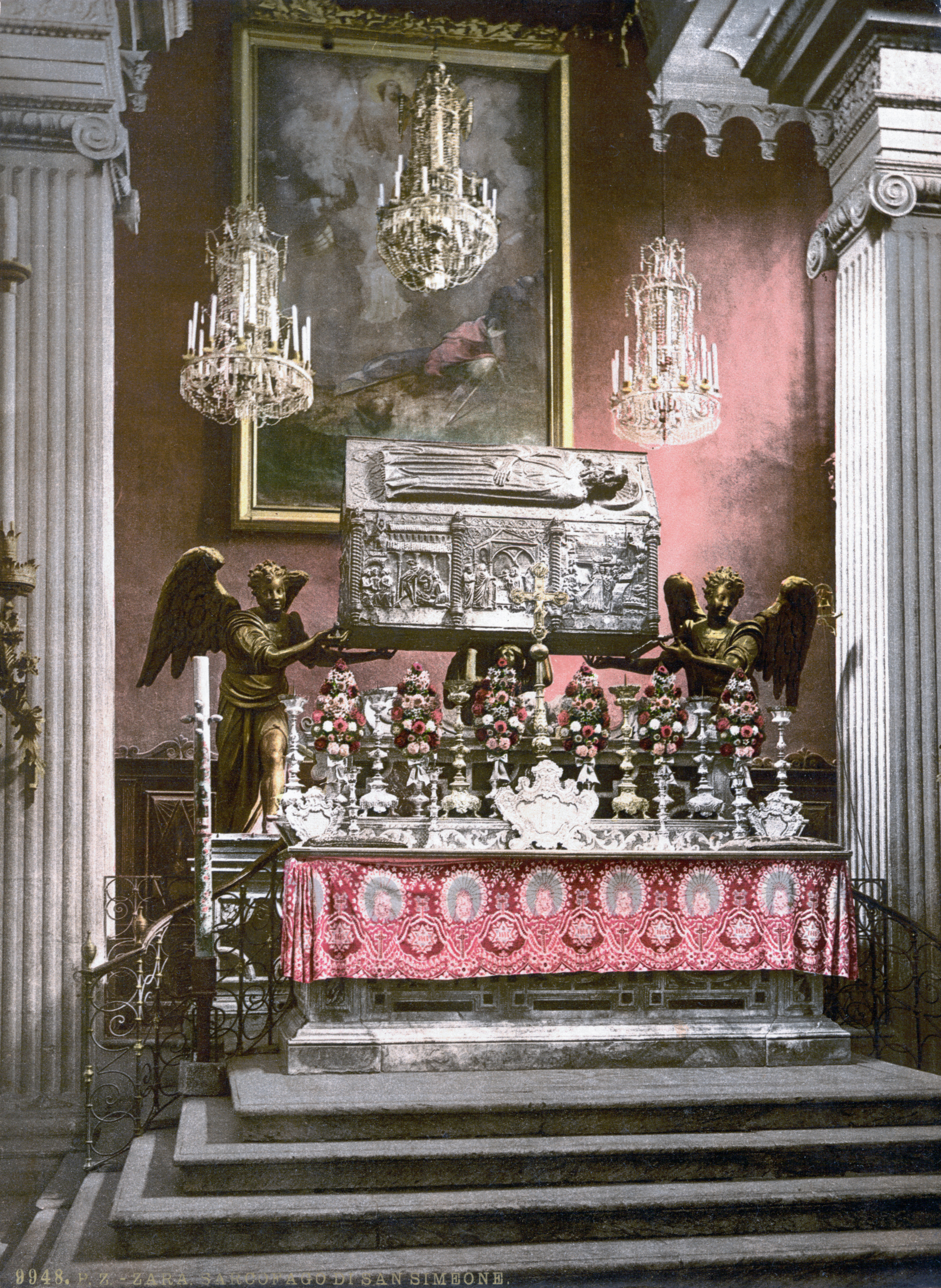
Chest of Saint Simeon from 1380 in Zadar, photographed c. 1900

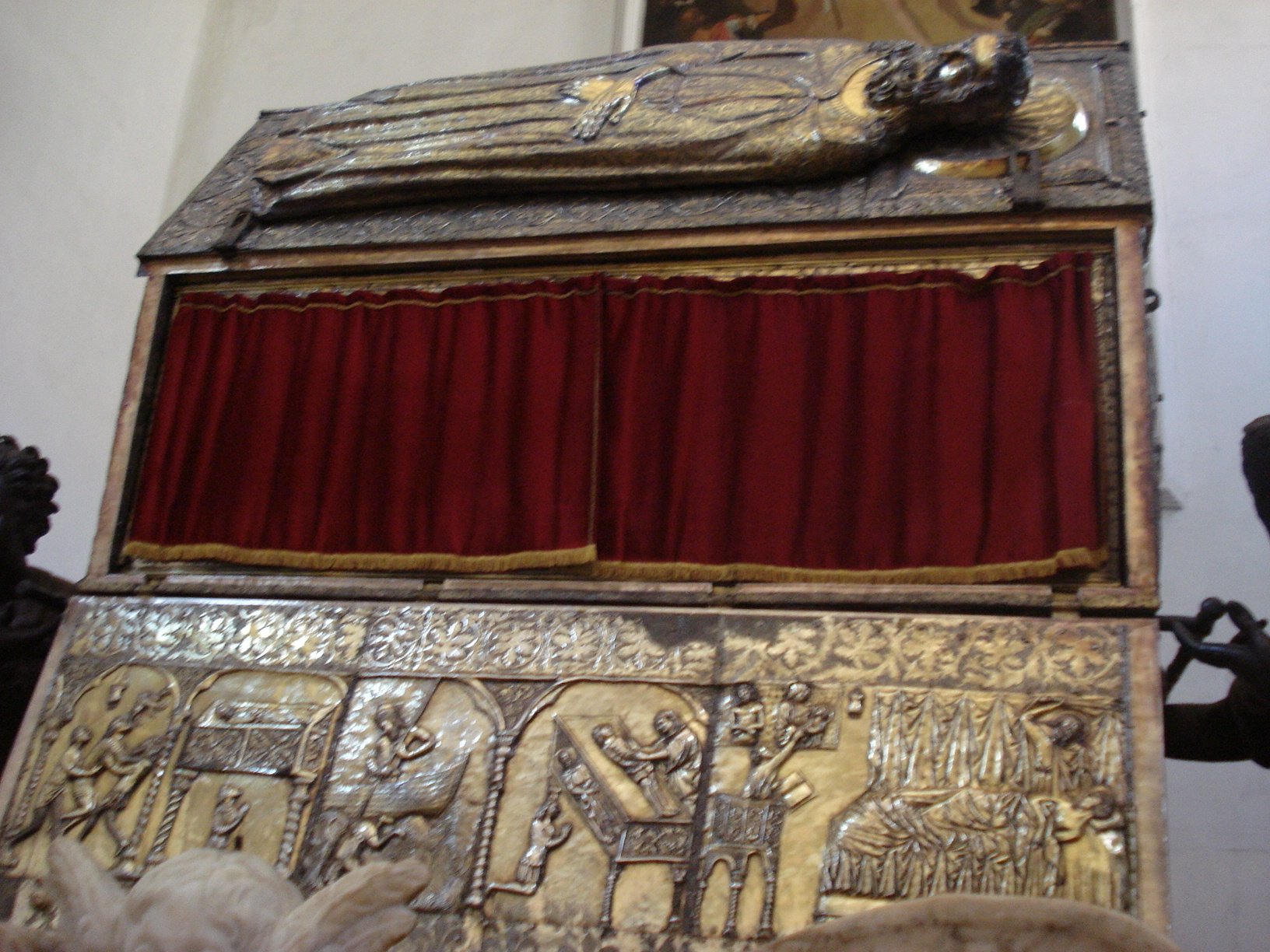
Chest of Saint Simeon today

This feast day has a number of different names:

- The Meeting of Our Lord, God and Saviour Jesus Christ (Eastern Orthodox Church)
- The Coming of the Son of God into the Temple (Armenian Apostolic Church)
- Feast of the Purification of the Virgin (Eastern Rite Catholic Churches)
- The Presentation of the Lord (ordinary form of the Roman Rite of the Catholic Church)
- Feast of the Purification of the Blessed Virgin Mary (1962 and earlier forms of the Roman Rite of the Catholic Church)
- The Presentation of Our Lord Jesus Christ in The Temple (Episcopal Church of the United States)
- Presentation of Our Lord (Evangelical Lutheran Church in America)
- The Presentation of Christ in the Temple (Anglican Church of Canada)
- The Purification of the Blessed Virgin Mary (Anglican Church of Canada)
- The Presentation of Christ in the Temple (Church of England and Anglican Church of Australia).

=== 3 February ===
Simeon the Righteous is commemorated in his own right on 3 February. In the Anglican Communion Simeon is not venerated with a festal observance, and 3 February is designated to recognize Blaise, Bishop of Sebastea, or in modern calendars, Saint Anskar (801–865), a missionary, Archbishop of Hamburg-Bremen, and the first Bishop in Sweden in 864.

In the Eastern Orthodox tradition, Simeon is commemorated with Anna the Prophetess on 3 February on the Feast of the Holy and Righteous Simeon the God-Receiver and Anna the Prophetess.

=== 16 February ===
While both the Catholic Church and Orthodox Church agree on the date of Candlemas as the 40th day after Christmas, in accordance with the Mosaic Law, the difference in the marking of Christmas on 25 December resulted from a theological dispute on the replacement by the Gregorian calendar of the older Julian calendar. 25 December currently occurs 13 days later on the Julian calendar than on the Gregorian calendar. The Gregorian revision of the calendar occurred in 1582, well after the Great Schism between the Eastern and Western Christian churches in 1054. Consequently, many Orthodox Christians celebrate the feast of Saint Simeon on 16 February. As mentioned above, the Eastern Orthodox Church celebrates Saint Simeon on the day after the Feast of the Presentation, i.e. 3 February. However, for those churches that use the Julian calendar, 3 February is on 16 February of the modern Gregorian calendar.

The Armenian Apostolic Church celebrates the Nativity of Christ on 6 January, and so its celebration of the Presentation, which its denominates The Coming of the Son of God into the Temple, is on 14 February.

On 1 December occurs commemoration of his, James and Zacharias relics translation in 351, and 25 May is commemoration of their relics discover also in 351.

== See also ==
- Circumcision of Christ
- Epiphany
- Liturgical year
- "A Song for Simeon" – a 1928 poem by T. S. Eliot
