= Church of Saint Chrysogonus, Zadar =

Coordinates: 44.1161°N 15.2264°E

Church of St. Chrysogonus
- Crkva sv. Krševana
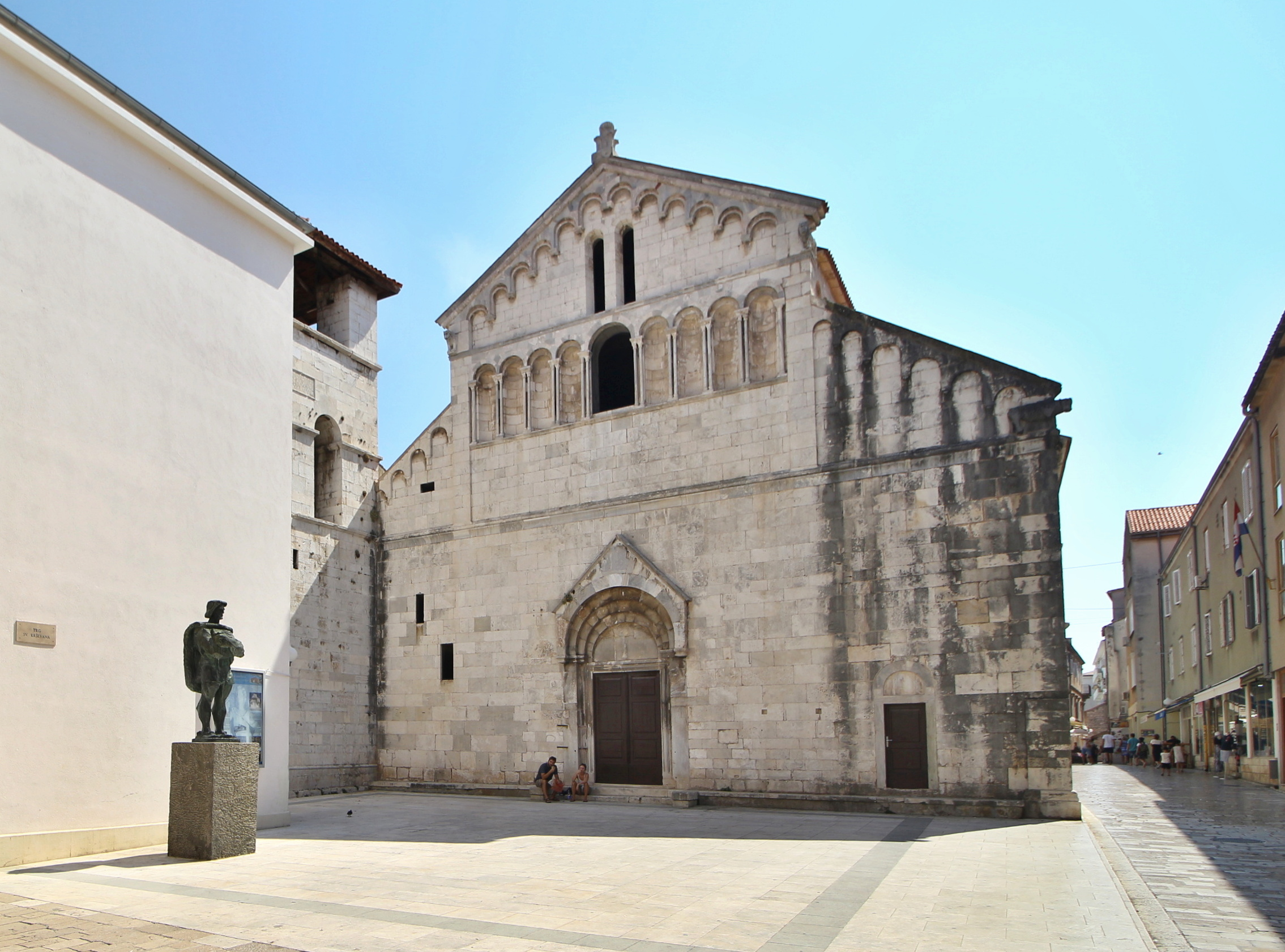
- Church of St. Chrysogonus
- Location: Zadar, Croatia
- Denomination: Roman Catholic

History
- Consecrated: 1175

Administration
- Archdiocese: Archdiocese of Zadar

The Church of St. Chrysogonus (Croatian: Crkva sv. Krševana) is a Roman Catholic church located in Zadar, Croatia, named after Saint Chrysogonus, the patron saint of the city.

The Romanesque church was consecrated by Lampridius, Archbishop of Zadar, in 1175. Built at the site of a Roman emporium, it replaced the Church of Saint Anthony the Hermit and is the only remaining part of a large medieval Benedictine abbey. In 1387, Elizabeth of Bosnia, the murdered queen dowager of Hungary and Dalmatia, was secretly buried in the church, where her body remained for three years until being moved to the Székesfehérvár Basilica. The construction of a bell tower began in 1485, but was abandoned in 1546 and never finished.

== Sources ==
- Crkva Sv. Krševana (in Croatian)
