= Gorjani, Croatia =

Gorjani Gara
- Municipality
- Location in Croatia Gorjani (Croatia)
- Coordinates: 45.40°N 18.37°E
- Country: Croatia
- Region: Slavonia
- County: Osijek-Baranja County

Government
  - Mayor: Ivan Lović

Area
  - Municipality: 50.9 km^{2} (19.7 sq mi)
  - Urban: 37.7 km^{2} (14.6 sq mi)

Population (2021)
  - Municipality: 1,246
  - Density: 24.5/km^{2} (63.4/sq mi)
  - Urban: 794
  - Urban density: 21.1/km^{2} (54.5/sq mi)
- Time zone: UTC+1 (Central European Time)
- Website: gorjani.hr

Gorjani (Hungarian: Gara; German: Gerendau, Görrach) is a village and a municipality in Osijek-Baranja County, Croatia.

In the 2011 census, there were a total of 1,550 inhabitants, in the following settlements:

- Gorjani, population 1,008
- Tomašanci, population 583

In the same census, 97% were Croats.

Gorjani village was the seat of the House of Garai (Garay), a Hungarian-Croatian noble family, and a branch of the Dorozsma (Durusma) clan.

== Name ==
The name of the village in Croatian is plural.

== History ==
King Béla IV of Hungary granted the eponymous domain of Gara to John of Clan Dorozsma and his son, Stephen, in 1269. The charter of grant mentioned that Stephen was swordbearer to the King's son, Béla, Duke of Slavonia. Stephen's sons, Andrew and Paul, were the ancestors of the two branches of the family. Andrew's son, Nicholas I Garai was Palatine of Hungary from 1375 until his death. Near Gorjani, he courageously defended his cousin and sovereign, Queen Mary of Hungary, and her mother, Elizabeth of Bosnia, from rebels.

Gorjani in 1387 was already a market town, which by 1478 held weekly markets.

After the Garai family died out, some of their estates were inherited by the Zay of Csömör family, others were granted to John Corvinus.
