= Šubić family tree =

This is the family tree of the House of Šubić (princes of Bribir), a Croatian noble family, from 1066 to 1456.

Budec, Župan (zhupan, iupanus, count) of Bribir (1066-1070)
Strezinja, Župan of Bribir (1075-1089)
Vukilo, Župan of Bribir (about 1090/1100)
Mrmonja (Marmonja), Župan of Bribir, signatory of the "Pacta conventa" agreement (1102)
Bogdan (Bogdanac), župan of Bribir (1164)
Miroslav I. župan of Bribir (1180-1184)
Grgur I. prince (princeps) of Bribir (1184)
Grgur II. bishop of Knin (1229)	Vuičin prince of Zvonigrad (1220) and prince of Split (1224)	Pribina, prince of Bribir (1197)	Marko I. (died 1200)
Juraj, prince of Bribir (1197 ?)	Grgur III. prince of Bribir (1197-1199), and prince of Split and Šibenik (1217-1235)	Stjepan I. prince of Bribir and Trogir (1217-1238)	Vulčina (Vučina), prince of Trogir (about 1220), died 1226	Budislav, prince of Bribir (1227 ?)	Obrad
Miroslav II. (1308)	Marko II. prince of Split (1284-1300)	Martin (1274)	Stjepan (Stjepko) II. prince of Trogir (1239-1240), died 1274	Jakov I. prince of Bribir (1251) and Nin (1267), died 1270	Vukeša, prince of Bribir (1284-1290)	Ugrin, prince of Bribir (1300)
Stjepan III. prince of Bribir (1324)	Ilija, prince of Bribir (1324 ?)	Slavogost, prince of Bribir (1309-1324)	Grgur IV. prince of Bribir (1324 ?)	Urša (died 1303)	Pavao I. (*1245-†1312); Ban (viceroy) of Croatia (1274-1312), Lord of Bosnia	Juraj I. prince of Šibenik and Trogir (1274-1302)	Mladen I. prince of Split (1283-1298), ban of Bosnia (1299-1304)	Stanislava, a nun	a daughter, wife of Jacopo Tiepolo (1274-1330)	Ivan I. prince of Bribir (1348)	Daniel, prince of Šibenik (1246-1269)	Radoslav, prince of Bribir (1274), died 1275	Budislav I. Ugrinić (1345-1375)
Mihajlo; Slavogostić (1324)	Pavao; Slavogostić (1324)	Grgur; Slavogostić (1324)	Mladen II. (*1270-†1343); Ban of Croatia (1312-1322), Ban of Bosnia (1304-1322)	Juraj II. (*1275-†1330) prince of Split	Pavao II. (died 1346) prince of Trogir and Ostrovica (1305-1346)	Elizabeta; Frankopan, princess of Krk († after 1347)	Grgur V. prince of Šibenik (1320)	Marko III. prince of Bribir (1322-1345)	Jure; Ugrinić, (1356-1397)	Nikola; Ugrinić, (died 1388)	Vid Ugrinić, (1356-1388)	Grgur VI. Ugrinić, (1388)
Katarina, wife of Ivan; Jurišić of Bribir	Jelena (*1306-†1378) wife of Vladislav; Kotromanić, mother of Bosnian king Tvrtko	Pavao III. (died 1356) prince of Klis (1348-1356)	Mladen III. (*1315-†1348) prince of Klis (1330-1348)	Božidar, prince of Bribir (1345-1348)	Juraj III. (died 1361) prince of Zrin (1347-1361), became Juraj I Zrinski Continued in Zrinski family tree	Pribko (1346-1361)	Katarina, a nun	Katarina, married in Bosnia	Budislav II. Ugrinić, (1385)	Grgur VIII. Ugrinić (1390)
Katarina (1356)	Marko V. prince of Bribir (1385)	Mladen IV.	Katarina, (died 1358) wife of Boleslaw III, polish duke	Ivan; Ugrinić
Mikula (Nikola), prince of Bribir	Stjepan; Ugrinić (1498)
Pavao IV. Nikolić (1387-1413)
Jakov II. (died 1456); Vice-Ban of Croatia (1411), last prince of Bribir	Mikac; Krivčić (1413-1445)	Grgur IX. (1413-1445)
Grgur X. (1446)

== See also ==
- House of Šubić
- House of Zrinski
- Zrinski family tree
- List of rulers of Croatia
