= Stanislava Šubić =

Stanislava Šubić (Bribir, 1242 – Skradin, 1321) was a Croatian noblewoman and nun who spent much of her life as part of the monastery of Saint Elizabeth in Skradin. She was born in Bribir to Stjepan Šubić of the prominent Šubić noble family and later joined the Order of Saint Clare in a monastery founded by her brother Paul I Šubić of Bribir and built by 1290. As Skradin was being elevated to an autonomous commune in 1304, its citizens promised to supply her monastery with firewood four times annually, during which she was mentioned in sources as head of the nuns there. According to a later claim by historian Daniele Farlati, pope Gregory XI included her in a list of holy virgins, suggesting she was beatified shortly after her death at the start of 14th century.
