= Bribir =

Bribir is the name of two villages in Croatia:

- Bribir, Primorje-Gorski Kotar County
- Bribir, Šibenik-Knin County
  - Bribir is used as a reference to the historic seat of the House of Šubić
