= Subic =

Subic may refer to:

- Subic Bay, a bay in the Philippines
  - U.S. Naval Base Subic Bay, former United States naval base
  - Subic Special Economic and Freeport Zone, an economic free trade area located in the former U.S. naval base
- Subic, Zambales, a municipality in the Philippines located on the bay
- Šubić family, a noble clan from Dalmatia
- Šubic, a Slovenian surname
- Subić, a Serbian surname
