= Strezinja, Župan of Bribir =

Strezinja (fl. 1075–1089) was an 11th-century župan of Bribir, and a known member of the Šubić noble family (later the Zrinski's). At one point, he is mentioned with a retinue of five knights, which indicates private armies in service of župan's. He was in a land dispute with the abbot of the Benedictine monastery of Saint John the Evangelist in the city of Biograd, which was eventually resolved by king Demetrius Zvonimir in Nin. He is later mentioned as part of the retinue of king Stephen II.

== See also ==
- Šubić family tree

Preceded by Budec	Župan of Bribir c.1075-1089	Succeeded by Vukilo
