= Budec, Župan of Bribir =

Budec (fl. 1066–1070) was an 11th-century župan of Bribir, and the first known member of the Šubić noble family (later the Zrinski's). He also served at the court of King Peter Krešimir IV of Croatia as a postelnic (a type of chamberlain).

== See also ==
- Šubić family tree

Preceded by unknown	Župan of Bribir c. 1066 – 1070	Succeeded by Strezinja
