= Ostrovica Fortress =

Castle in Croatia

- Ostrovica, Zadar County, Croatia
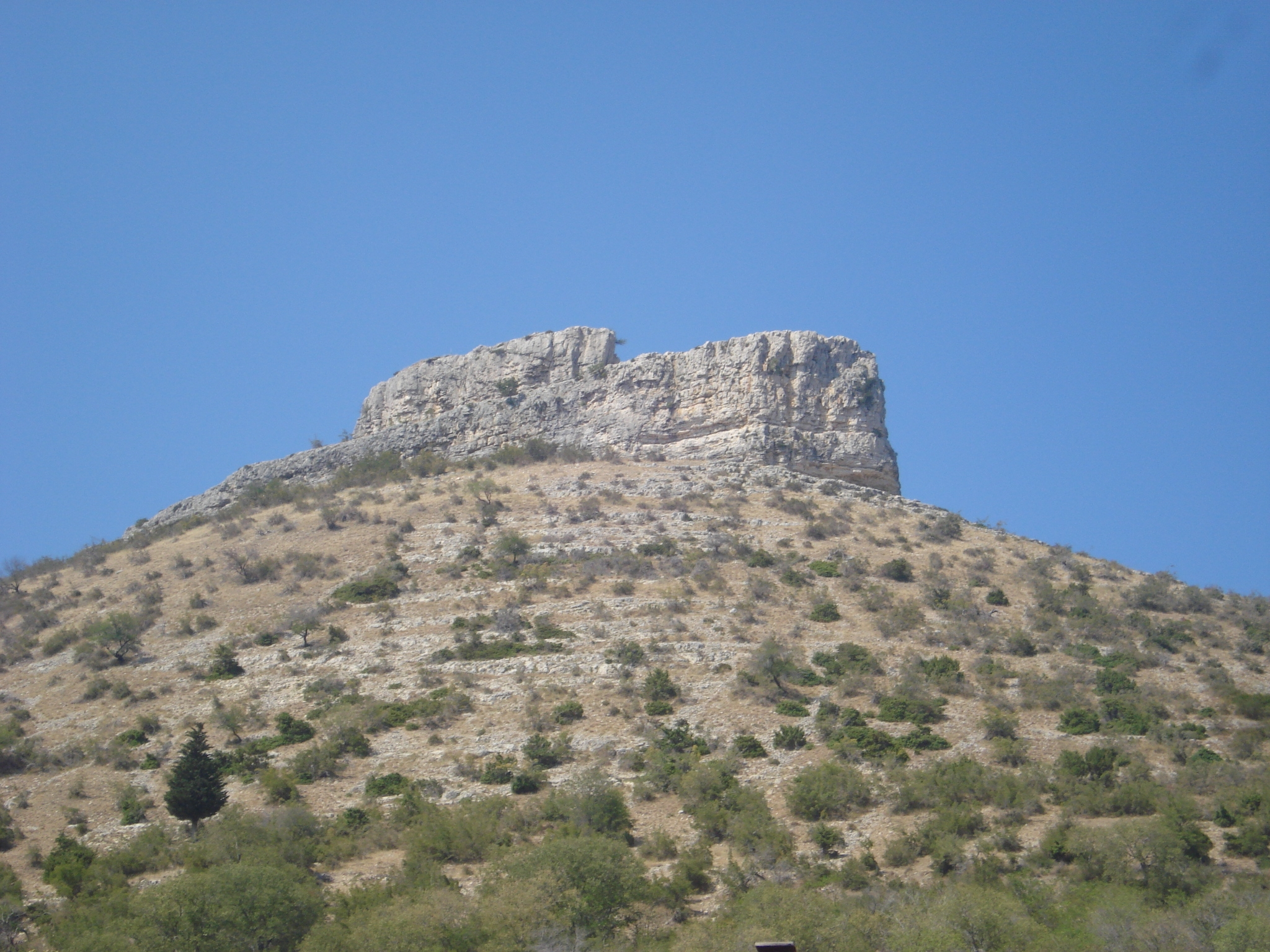
- Steep rock with remains of the former fortress

Site information
- Type: Hilltop castle
- Controlled by: Šubić noble family (until 1347), king Louis I Angevin (1347–1382), various other proprietors in shorter periods of time
- Condition: razed to the ground

Location
- Location within Croatia
- Coordinates: 43.958889°N 15.793611°E

Site history
- Built: 12th century (?)
- Built by: (unknown)
- Materials: hewn stone (ashlar)

Ostrovica Fortress (Croatian pronunciation: [ˈostrovitsa]; Croatian: Tvrđava Ostrovica) is a ruined medieval fortification on a solid rock jutting from the top of the hill above the village of Ostrovica in Zadar County, Croatia. It is located between the two historical and geographical regions, Bukovica and Ravni Kotari. It was once an important stronghold, known as the "Key to the City of Zadar", as it was a key defense of the city. It was destroyed during the Ottoman–Venetian Wars in the second half of the 17th century, leaving only a few remains.

== History ==
The name Ostrovica was first mentioned in the second half of the 12th century (according to Croatian historian Vjekoslav Klaić), when the Byzantine historian John Cinnamus listed the Croatian places conquered by the army of the Byzantine Emperor Manuel I Comnenus in 1168, quoting, among others, Split, Trogir, Šibenik, Skradin and Ostrovica. For the second time castrum Ostrovica was specified as a place where an army of, then herzog (duke), Andrew II, future Croato-Hungarian king, camped in 1198 on its way back home from a military campaign in the south.

The fortress, as well as the whole medieval Bribir Župa (County), was owned by members of the Šubić noble family, known as nobiles, comites or principes Breberienses (Princes of Breber, "Knezovi Bribirski" in Croatian), until 1347. After the death of Pavao (Paul) II Šubić in 1346, who used to live in Ostrovica, he was succeeded by his underaged son George (Juraj) III Šubić and his son's legal representative (George's uncle and Paul's younger brother) Grgur (Gregory). It was in the very next year, that the ruling king Louis I demanded from Šubićs to hand him over the fortress, for he wanted to use it as a strategic point in a war against the Republic of Venice. In exchange for it, the king granted them the Zrin Castle and surrounding estate, a very distant property to the north of the country, actually in lower Slavonia, one of Croatian lands.

Ostrovica had strategic significance since ancient times. It controlled the important ways and routes in directions of north-south (between Siscia and Salona) as well as of west-east (between Zadar and Knin). So it helped king Louis to win the war and to liberate Dalmatia from Venetians, which was ended in 1358 by signing the Peace Treaty of Zadar. After Louis' death in 1382, the fortress changed various owners in a relatively short period of time. For instance, it was property of Ivan Paližna, Prior of vrana and Ban (viceroy) of Croatia, and his descendants, then (between 1388 and 1391) of the mighty Bosnian king Tvrtko I, and from 1393 of the Vuk Vukčić Hrvatinić (younger brother of Hrvoje Vukčić Hrvatinić, Grand Duke of Bosnia), who was appointed Ban of Croatia for some time by the counter-king Ladislaus of Naples.

At the beginning of the 15th century, it was Sandalj Hranić Kosača, Grand Duke of Hum, who married Katarina, a daughter of Vuk Vukčić Hrvatinić, and was given Ostrovica as her dowry (in spring 1405), together with the Town of Skradin. This was acknowledged by the king Ladislaus in a charter dated 23 March 1407. However, new circumstances occurred in 1409, as Ladislaus sold his rights to Dalmatia to the Republic of Venice. Subsequently, negotiated Sandalj Hranić Kosača the terms of delivery of the castle to Venetians and agreed upon its handover for the sum of 5.000 ducats. An agreement was signed in Zadar on 13 April 1411, and so the Most Serene Republic gradually took over the whole Dalmatia for a while, paying for it the sum of 100.000 ducats to king Ladislaus.

The fall of medieval Bosnian Kingdom into Ottoman hands in 1463 meant a new and constant jeopardy for the fortress. However, it remained within territory of the Croato-Hungarian Kingdom until 1523, when it was conquered by the Ottomans, together with surrounding land and villages.

In the next decades Ostrovica was subject to face the instability of the military frontier between the Ottomans and Venetians and was finally razed to the ground in the second half of the 17th century. According to available sources, the fortress still existed in 1671, as Stojan Janković, a famous warrior against the Turks, was appointed its Venetian military commander. After that, on the plateau of Ostrovica's steep rock there were only remains of the ruined fortress left. Today can only some of them be found, like stone water cistern, hewn stone stairway and fragments of gothic glazed ceramics.

== Gallery ==
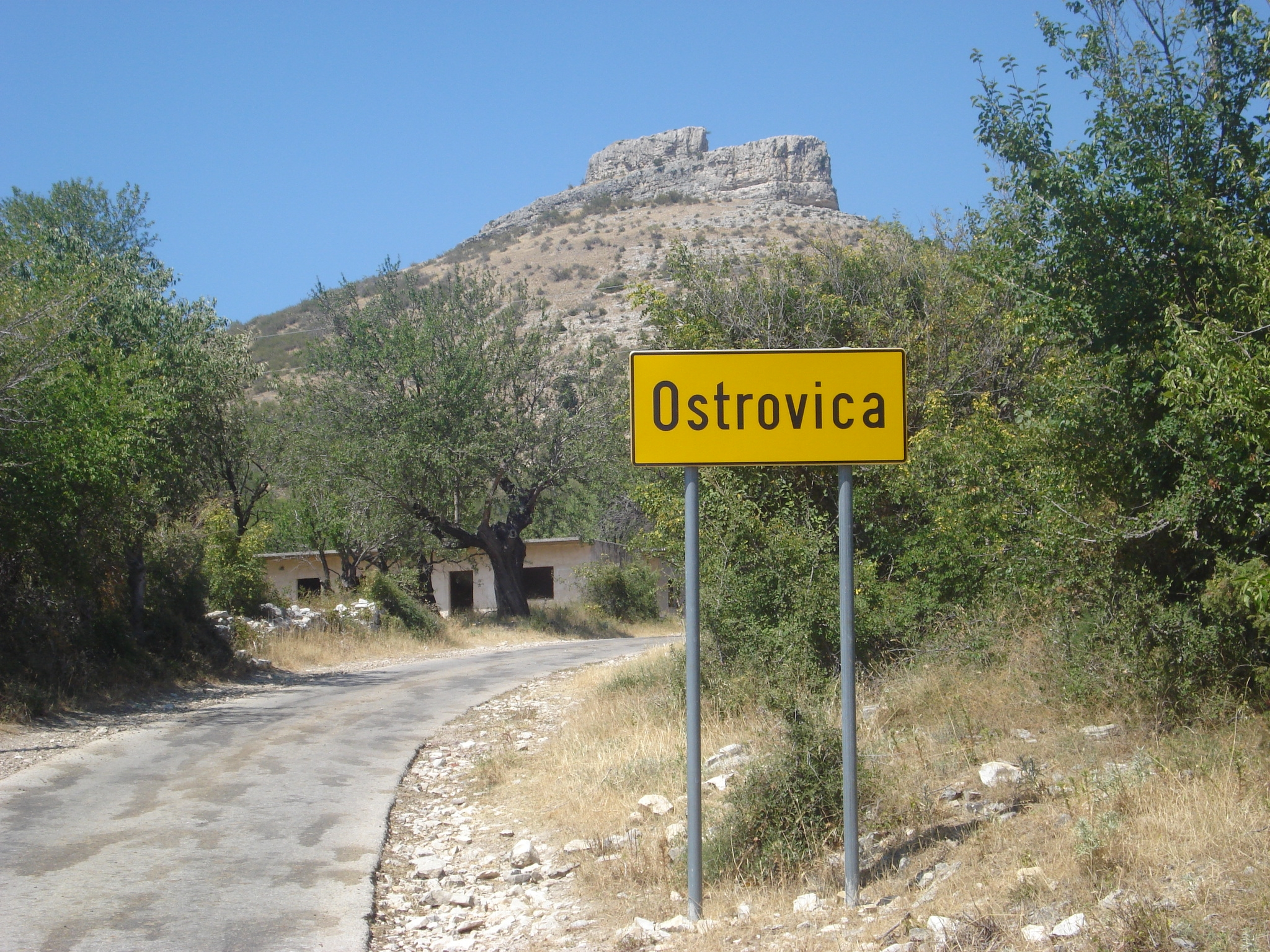
Traffic sign of the village and the steep rock in the background (south view)

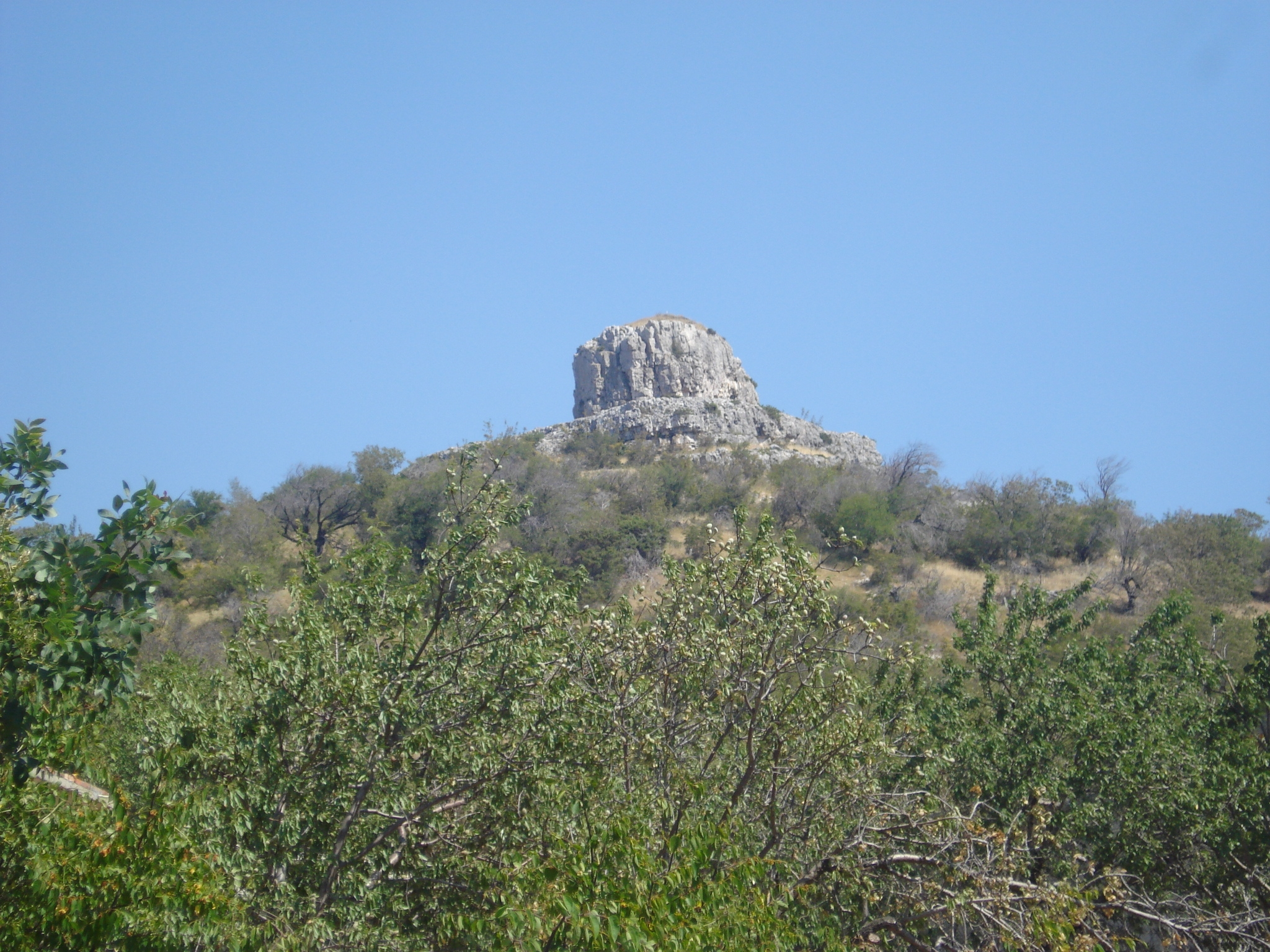
West view of the steep rock

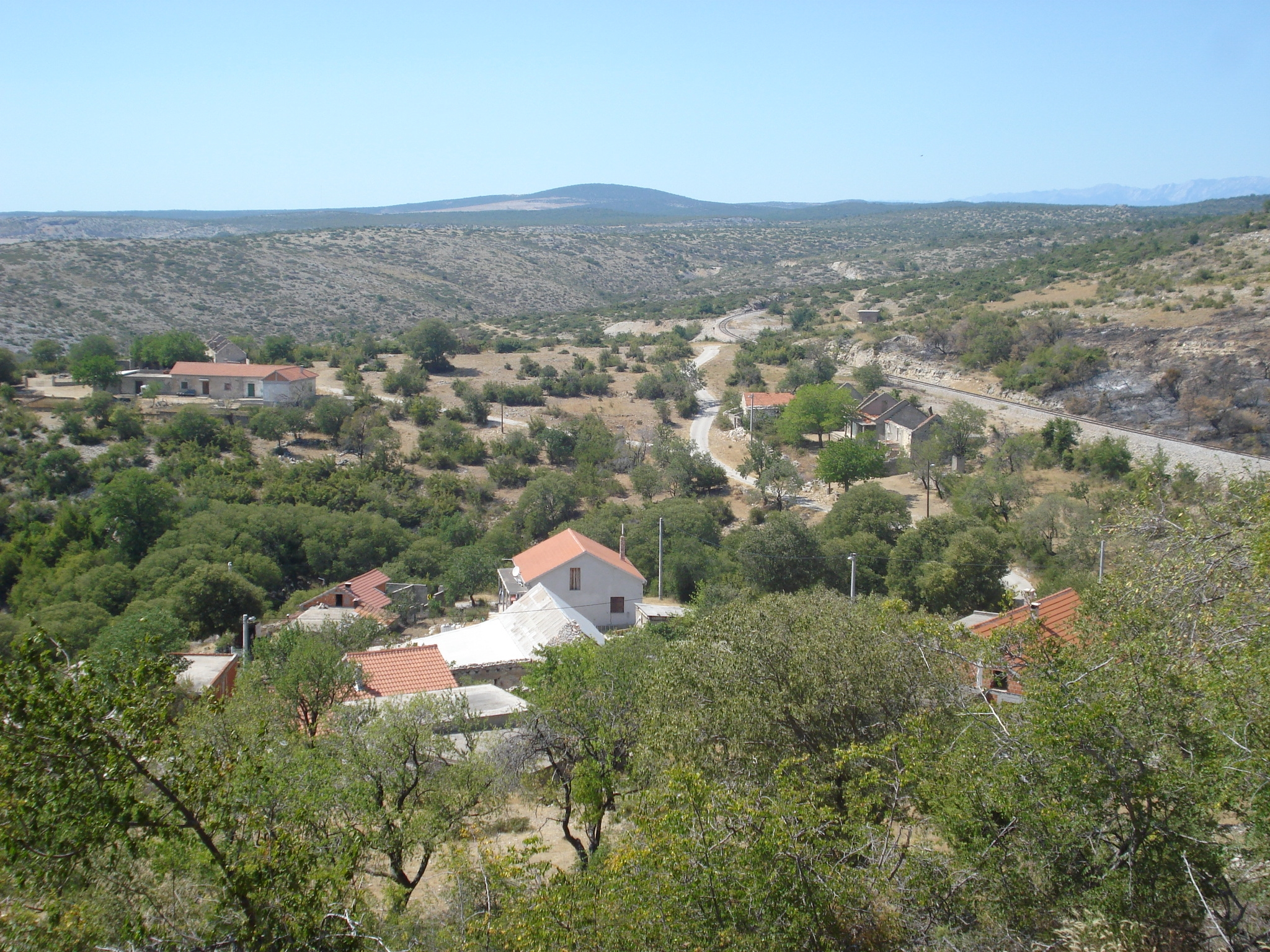
View from the hill above the village to the west

== See also ==
- List of castles in Croatia
- Timeline of Croatian history
- Military history of Croatia
- House of Šubić
