= Šubic =

Šubic is a Slovenian language surname. Notable people with the surname include:

- Ive Šubic (23 April 1922 – 29 December 1989), Slovene painter, graphic artists and illustrator
- Vladimir Šubic (23 May 1894 – 16 November 1946), Slovene architect

== See also ==
- Šubić family, a noble clan from Dalmatia
- Subic (disambiguation)
