= Lišane Ostrovičke =

- Municipality
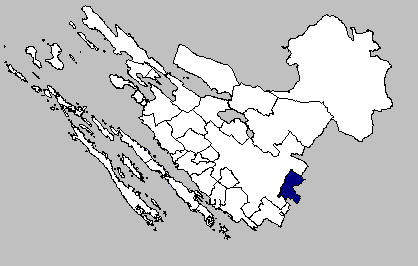
- Lišane Ostrovičke municipality within the Zadar County
- Interactive map of Lišane Ostrovičke
- Location of Lišane Ostrovičke in Croatia
- Coordinates: 43°58′07″N 15°46′27″E
- Country: Croatia
- Region: Dalmatia
- County: Zadar County

Area
  - Municipality: 49.0 km^{2} (18.9 sq mi)
  - Urban: 20.0 km^{2} (7.7 sq mi)

Population (2021)
  - Municipality: 593
  - Density: 12.1/km^{2} (31.3/sq mi)
  - Urban: 509
  - Urban density: 25.4/km^{2} (65.9/sq mi)
- Postal code: 23420
- Website: lisane-ostrovicke.hr

Lišane Ostrovičke is a village and a municipality in Zadar County, Croatia. According to the 2021 census, there are 593 inhabitants, 89% of which are Croats.

== Demographics ==
In 2021, the municipality had 593 residents in the following 3 settlements:

- Dobropoljci, population 23
- Lišane Ostrovičke, population 509
- Ostrovica, population 61
Lišane Ostrovičke: Population trends 1857–2021
v

| population | 996 | 1662 | 1184 | 1196 | 1311 | 1475 | 1859 | 1741 | 1898 | 2064 | 2079 | 1949 | 1793 | 1636 | 764 | 698 | 593 |
| | 1857 | 1869 | 1880 | 1890 | 1900 | 1910 | 1921 | 1931 | 1948 | 1953 | 1961 | 1971 | 1981 | 1991 | 2001 | 2011 | 2021 |

Sources: Croatian Bureau of Statistics publications

== Politics ==
=== Minority councils and representatives ===
Directly elected minority councils and representatives are tasked with consulting tasks for the local or regional authorities in which they are advocating for minority rights and interests, integration into public life and participation in the management of local affairs. At the 2023 Croatian national minorities councils and representatives elections Serbs of Croatia fulfilled legal requirements to elect 10 members minority councils of the Municipality of Lišane Ostrovičke but the elections were not held due to the absence of candidatures.
