= George I Šubić of Bribir =

George I Šubić of Bribir (Croatian: Juraj I Šubić Bribirski) (c. 1277 – 1302) was the Count of Trogir, and a member of the Croatian Šubić noble family.

Juraj I Šubić was brother of Paul I Šubić of Bribir, who was the most powerful Croatian noble at the end of the 13th century and beginning of the 14th century. In Dalmatia, Paul appointed his brothers as commissars of Dalmatian cities. He gave Split to his brother Mladen I, and Šibenik, Nin, Trogir and Omiš to his brother Juraj I Šubić.

Juraj I Šubić had his seat in Klis Fortress, from where he monitored the coastal cities. He died in 1302. After his death, his brother Mladen I ruled from Klis.

== See also ==
- Šubić

== Sources ==
- Opća i nacionalna enciklopedija u 20 svezaka, sv. III, str. 186-187, ISBN 953-7224-03-1
