= Paul I Šubić of Bribir =

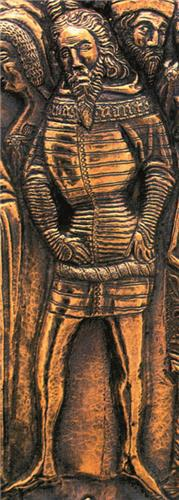
- Depiction of Paul Šubić from the 14th century Chest of Saint Simeon

Ban of Croatia
- Reign: 1273–1274; 1275–1312
- Predecessor: Maurus (1st term); Nicholas Gutkeled (2nd term)
- Successor: Mladen II Šubić

Lord of Bosnia
- Reign: 1299–1312
- Predecessor: Stephen I Kotromanić
- Successor: Mladen II Šubić
- Born: c. 1245
- Died: 1 May 1312 (aged 66–67)
- Burial: Church of St. Mary, Bribir, Kingdom of Croatia
- Spouse: Ursa (m. 1289; died 1303)
- Issue: Mladen II; George II; Paul II; Gregory II
- House: Šubić
- Father: Stephen II Šubić
- Religion: Roman Catholic

Paul I Šubić of Bribir (Croatian: Pavao I. Šubić Bribirski, Hungarian: bribiri I. Subics Pál; c. 1245 – 1 May 1312) was Ban of Croatia between 1275 and 1312, and Lord of Bosnia from 1299 to 1312. As the oldest son of Stephen II of the Šubić noble family, he inherited the title of count of Bribir. He was appointed ban in 1273. He was relieved from duty in 1274, following his involvement in disputes between the Dalmatian coastal cities of Trogir and Split, and was returned to office in 1275.

With the help of his brothers, Mladen I and George I, Paul imposed direct rule over most of the coastal cities. The contest over the lands of the Kačić family in southern Croatia, who were known for piracy in the Adriatic Sea, brought Paul into conflict with the Republic of Venice. At the same time, the Šubićs became allies with the House of Anjou from Naples. Fighting with Venice continued intermittently until a peace treaty in 1294.

During the succession crisis of the 1290s, Paul emerged as one of the most powerful oligarchs in the realm, and was the main ally of the Angevins in their struggle against the Árpád dynasty. In 1300, Paul invited the Angevin contender to the throne, Charles Robert, to Split and from there accompanied him to Zagreb, where Charles was recognized as king of Hungary and Croatia. Paul did not take part in subsequent activities of Charles in Hungary, where he was not recognized as king for another 10 years. Paul expanded his dominion eastward, over the Banate of Bosnia in 1299, and Hum in 1301, whose territories he distributed among his family members. In 1304, Paul led a campaign into Bosnia after Mladen I, whom Paul appointed Ban of Bosnia, was killed by rebels. The rebellion was quickly quelled, and Paul passed the title of Bosnian ban to his son, Mladen II.

The king's authority over the lands held by Paul was only nominal throughout the entirety of his rule, during which he managed to turn his titles into hereditary ones for his family. His main seats were in Bribir and the city of Skradin. He issued his own coin, minted with silver from Bosnia, and arranged the establishment of three new Catholic dioceses in Croatia. In 1311, Paul assisted a revolt against Venice in Zadar and gained control over the city, which led to another war with the Venetians. Paul died shortly after the capture of Zadar, in May 1312, while peace negotiations with Venice were underway. He was succeeded by his eldest son, Mladen II.

== Early life ==
Paul was the eldest son of Stephen II of the Šubić family, the most influential noble house in the Kingdom of Croatia and Dalmatia, at the time in a personal union with the Kingdom of Hungary. The exact date of Paul's birth is unknown, the year is estimated around 1245. He had two brothers, Mladen I and George I. Of his sisters, the name of Stanislava is known. Paul's father, Stephen II, was involved in the war with the Mongol Empire in 1242, when King Béla IV took refugee in the city of Trogir, which he governed. For his assistance, Béla granted the County of Bribir hereditarily to Stephen in 1251. Around this time, Stephen emerged as the head of the Šubić family, following an internal struggle for leadership. Along with Trogir and Bribir, the Šubićs governed the County of Šibenik. Stephen's wife, whose name is not known, was related to the royal Árpád dynasty, probably with one of its female branches.

Paul inherited the title of count of Bribir from his father, who died before 1267. The first mention of his name occurs in 1272, when he was Podestà of the city of Trogir. In May 1273, Paul was Count of Trogir and Split. His brother, George I, was named Count of Šibenik. Paul had good relations with the Gutkeleds, and supported Slavonian Ban Joachim Gutkeled, who was probably his cousin, in his struggle with competing nobles. From 1273, Paul was the ban of the maritime regions (Latin: banus maritimus), in place of previous ban Maurus. The ban of the maritime regions, also referred to as Ban of Croatia, was in the 13th century the deputy of the ban of all Slavonia, who governed both the Croatian Kingdom and Slavonia. Through this duty, the influence of Paul and his brothers grew rapidly.

== Reign ==
=== Consolidation of power ===
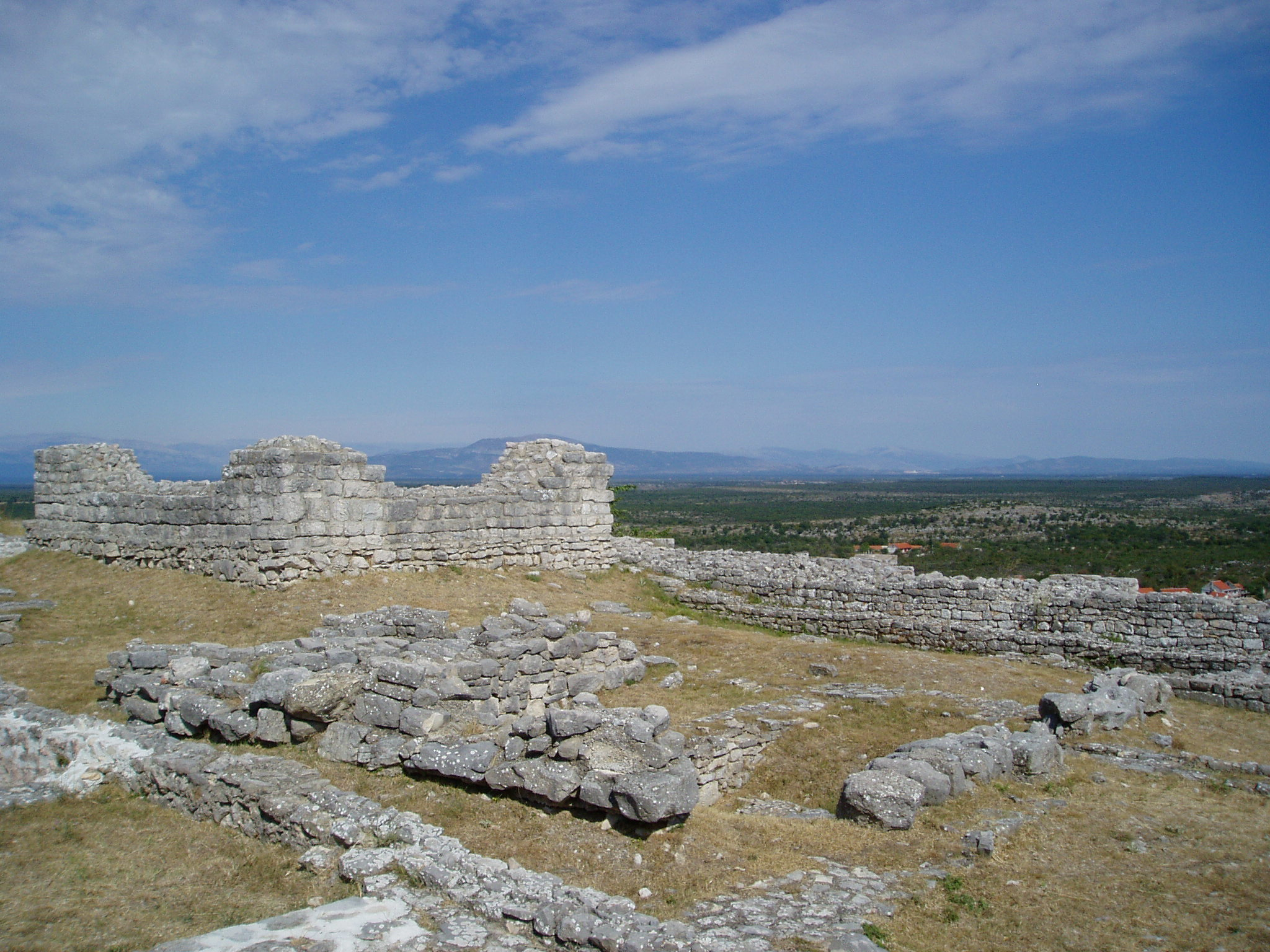
Remains of the fortress of Bribir, one of Paul's seats

Paul became involved in the longstanding dispute between Split and Trogir. The two cities were at war in the 1240s over possessions in the hinterland of Split. Paul acted in favor of Split and tried to strengthen his rule over Trogir, which had mutinied against Paul. He ignored the warnings of King Ladislaus IV, who took Trogir under his protection. In the winter of 1273/1274, Split attacked the Fortress of Klis, whose castellan was a supporter of Trogir. While the attack failed, Paul managed to subjugate Trogir in the spring of 1274. He was also involved in the dispute between Šibenik and Trogir over the Church of Šibenik. Paul favored the position of Šibenik, and pressed for the secession of its Church from the Diocese of Trogir. He was then briefly removed from the position of ban in the second half of 1274. He returned to the office in the summer of the following year. The position of ban of all Slavonia was held jointly by Ivan Kőszegi and Nicholas Gutkeled. For Nicholas, a new title, ban of all Croatia and Dalmatia, was established. Nicholas held this title in 1275, and Paul remained the only ban in Croatia after he moved to Hungary.

Paul's brother, Mladen I, succeeded him as Podestà of Trogir, and was later Count of Trogir and Split. By 1278, the Šubićs governed almost all coastal cities south of the Velebit Mountain. Among them was Skradin near Šibenik. Skradin was one of Paul's seats, along with Bribir, Klis, and the Ostrovica Fortress. Beside these, Paul also owned the castles of Knin and Počitelj. The lands owned by the Šubićs did not form a compact area, and they competed with other noble families for control over counties and forts.

Paul sought to consolidate his control over the holdings of the Kačić family, a pirate stronghold in southern Croatia, centred around the city of Omiš. The House of Anjou from the Kingdom of Naples was also active in suppressing the pirates from that area. During this period, the Šubić and the Anjou families established friendly relations. The Angevins controlled southern Italy, which was an important source of grain for Dalmatian coastal cities and the hinterland in late 13th century. The first contacts between the two families were made before Paul's 2nd term as ban, at the initiative of the Angevins who saw in them potential allies.

The Angevin forces took the islands of Hvar and Brač from the Kačićs in 1275. The Republic of Venice started its own war against the Kačićs in 1276. By April 1278, the islands of Hvar and Brač recognized Venetian authority. This threatened Paul's interests and he intervened in the conflict against Venice. In the course of the war, Paul gained control of Omiš and the island of Brač, where he appointed a nobleman from Zadar to govern it. George I was appointed Count of Omiš. The Kačićs were no longer in power, which eliminated the threat of pirates to Paul's ships in the Adriatic Sea.

In 1288, Paul started negotiating a peace deal with Venice. After long talks, a peace treaty was concluded in May 1290. Paul's representatives in the negotiations guaranteed that the pirates from Omiš would not attack Venetian ships and that they would not sail in the northern Adriatic. The Venetian authority over the islands of Hvar and Brač was acknowledged. The cities of Trogir, Šibenik, and Split agreed to pay 20,000 libras to Venice as a warranty. The Venetians guaranteed that they would not attack Paul's territories and gave his brother, George I, a free passage in his visits to the Papal States and in other trips. The peace treaty was broken in May 1293, when Venice captured Omiš with the help of a local noble. The conflict was renewed and lasted until March 1294 and a new peace treaty, signed under the same conditions as the first one, and Omiš returned to the Šubićs. Paul turned to seeking allies in Venice, through his ties with the Tiepolo family, as well as in the Venetian-controlled Dalmatian communes of Rab and Zadar. Marital ties were established with the House of Gorizia, who were rivals of Venice.

Paul maintained good relations with the Pope and the Catholic Church. He shared common interests with the Roman Curia in suppressing heresy in the region and countering Venetian dominance in the Adriatic, and both supported the House of Anjou in their claim to the throne. Their contacts became more frequent after 1290, during the pontificate of Pope Nicholas IV. Prior to becoming pope, Nicholas was the Franciscan minister provincial of Slavonia, which covered the Kingdom of Croatia and Dalmatia. The Šubićs were also close to the Franciscan movement in Croatia.

=== Succession crisis ===
The dominion of Paul among the other oligarchs during the interregnum

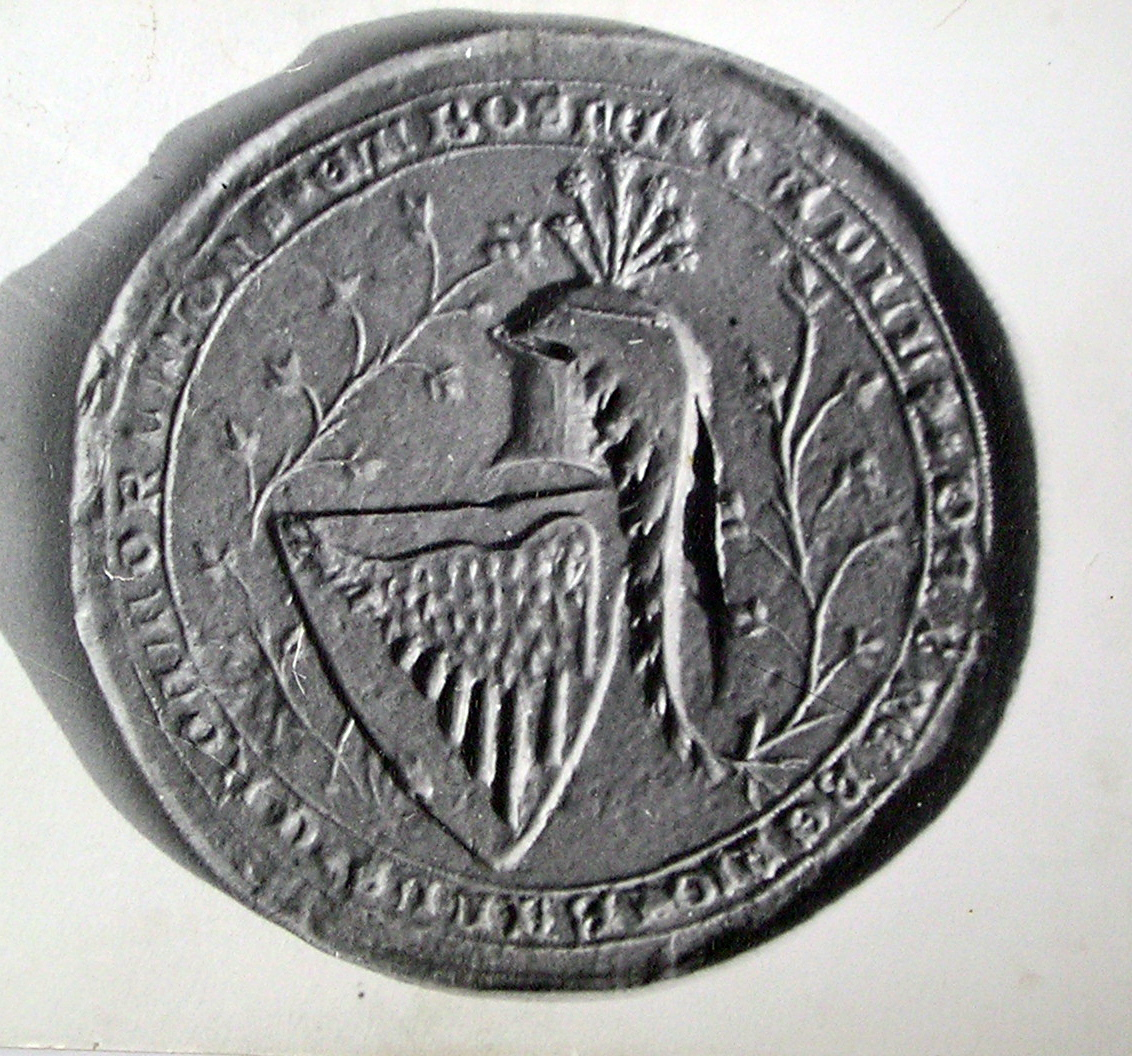
The seal of Paul, which reads "Paul of Bribir, Ban of the Croats and Lord of Bosnia".

With the death of King Ladislaus IV in 1290, who left no heirs, a war of succession broke out between Andrew III of the Árpád dynasty, supported by most of the Hungarian nobles, and Charles Martel of the House of Anjou, with the support of most of the Croatian nobility. Among them were the Šubić, the Kurjaković, the Frankopan, and the Babonić families, but their loyalty varied. Andrew III and Charles Martel competed with each other for the support of the nobility in Croatia and Slavonia. The Angevins primarily turned to Paul, while Andrew found an ally in Slavonian Ban Stephen III Babonić. This resulted in a dispute between the Šubićs and the Babonićs over the county of Drežnik near Bihać, which Andrew granted to the Babonićs, while the Angevins granted it to the Šubićs.

In November 1291, the Angevins and Paul agreed on the import of grain from Apulia. In 1292, Charles Martel's father, Charles II, in the name of his son, awarded Paul and the Šubić family the hereditary rights to all of Croatia from the Gvozd Mountain to the Neretva River, "with all the barons, vassals, cities, castles, and villages, with adjacent islands and all the rights and appurtenances", except for the westernmost part of Croatia, ruled by the Frankopans. In 1293, Andrew III made a similar gesture by naming Paul the hereditary ban of Croatia and Dalmatia. With this move, Andrew may have won Paul's support for a brief time. Andrew III also asked Paul to recognize his mother, Tomasina Morosini, as the duchess of all Slavonia, a title that covered the entire territory from the Drava and Danube rivers to the Adriatic sea. This was not acceptable to Paul and he turned back to the Angevins.

The sudden death of Charles Martel from the plague in 1295 hampered the ambitions of the Anjou family. Charles Martel's rights to the throne passed to his son, Charles Robert. Charles II confirmed Paul's position of ban for life. Andrew III was accepted as king by the nobility and a short period of peace followed. In 1299, Andrew appointed his uncle, Albertino Morosini, Duke of Slavonia, and as he had no sons, the heir to the throne. This led to a new revolt on behalf of Charles Robert. The same year, Charles II confirmed all possessions of Paul and his brothers, both current and any in the future, on the condition that the Šubićs provide troops for the Angevin campaigns. Previous grants were unconditioned, and Paul started distancing himself from the Angevins.

Paul held the view that the right to the Hungarian and Croatian kingdoms is determined by the Holy See, on the grounds that Croatian King Demetrius Zvonimir and Hungarian King Stephen I were enthroned by the Pope. He sent George I to visit the Pope in Rome and the Anjou seat in Naples in January 1300. George convinced Charles II to press his grandson's claim to the throne and arrange Charles Robert's journey over the Adriatic Sea to the city of Split, where Paul would meet him. He also won Papal approval for one of the goals of the Šubić family, to remove the Church in Šibenik from the jurisdiction of the Bishop of Trogir, and to create a Diocese of Šibenik directly under the Archbishop of Split. George and Charles Robert arrived in Split in August. From there, Paul accompanied Charles to Zagreb, where loyal nobles – for instance, Ugrin Csák – recognized him as king. Of the lands and cities under the authority of Paul, only the city of Trogir, presumably due to the separation of the Diocese of Šibenik, tried to challenge the recognition of Charles.

Charles's opponent, Andrew III, died in January 1301. Around this time, Paul was on a pilgrimage to Rome. Charles hurried to Esztergom, where he was crowned with a provisional crown in the spring of 1301. Paul was not involved in Charles Robert's subsequent activities in Hungary, and focused on expanding his realm to the city of Zadar, then under Venetian rule, and the Banate of Bosnia. Despite the coronation, Charles was not fully recognized for another 10 years, and ruled only some parts of Hungary, while his power in Croatia was only nominal. Paul rarely made a reference to the king in his charters, and was de facto an independent ruler within his realm. He and his family members did not attend Charles Robert's coronation in 1309, to which he sent his emissaries. George, who ruled as count of maritime towns, maintained stronger contacts with the Angevins due to the threat of Venice.

=== Expansion ===
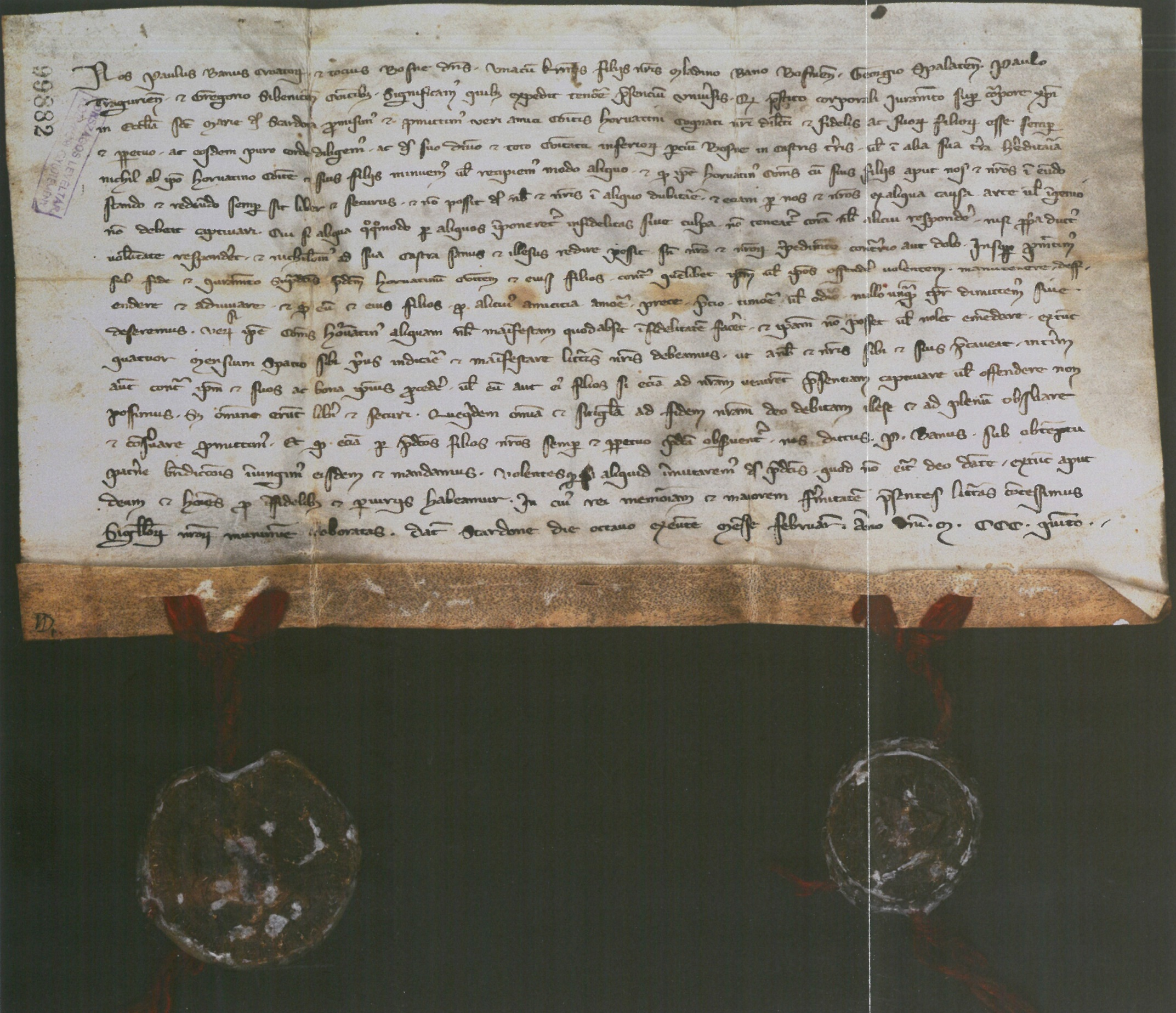
A Latin charter issued by Paul in 1305 to Hrvatin Stjepanić

In 1299, Paul expanded his rule to the Banate of Bosnia and took the title of lord of Bosnia (Latin: dominus Bosne). The main ally of Paul in Bosnia was Hrvatin Stjepanić of the Hrvatinić family, with kinship ties to the Šubićs, who ruled as Count of Donji Kraji. Paul's rule was contested by Bosnian Ban Stephen I Kotromanić. In the spring of 1302, Mladen I marched against Stephen, and by May he gained control of most of the banate up to the Drina River in the east. The offensive was over in June, when Mladen I, as the new ban of Bosnia, issued trading privileges to Split from Foča, a town on the banks of the Drina.

Paul also expanded to the southeast, on lands ruled by Serbian King Stefan Milutin, in 1301. He took advantage of the civil war in Serbia between Stefan Milutin and Stefan Dragutin, and captured the entire region of Hum. He then attacked the city of Kotor, with the help of the Venetian fleet, and from Dubrovnik and Zadar, cities under the sovereignty of Venice. The city held off the attack, which was the furthest point reached by Paul's armies. Peace negotiations between Paul and Stefan Milutin were planned in 1303, but it is not known whether the negotiations occurred and what was the outcome. Paul's eldest son, Mladen II, was appointed Lord of Hum. The administration of the land was entrusted to Konstantin (-1307) and Izan (1307-1313) of Nelipić family.

The death of his brother Mladen I in June 1304, who had been reportedly murdered by the supporters of Stephen I Kotromanić, described by the Šubićs as heretics, compelled Paul to lead an army into Bosnia and reaffirm his authority. He re-established his rule by February 1305, and passed the title of ban to Mladen II. Paul took the title of lord of all Bosnia. Charles Robert granted Paul the hereditary right to the Banate of Bosnia in 1308.

=== Last years ===
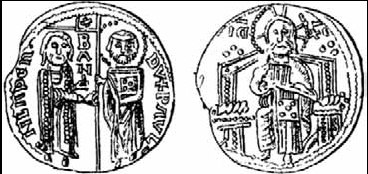
Coins of Paul and Mladen I

Paul preferred the title ban of the Croats (Latin: banus Croatorum), instead of ban of Croatia or ban of the maritime regions, suggesting that his power came from the people and the Croatian nobility rather than a higher authority. In this way, he stressed out his independence from the ban of all Slavonia. Paul's coat of arms was an eagle's wing on a shield. He kept a chancellery in both Skradin and Bribir. He issued his own coins, minted with silver from Bosnia, and modeled after the Venetian grosso. The coins bore the names of Mladen I and later Mladen II, the bans of Bosnia, and the name of Paul.

Along with the Diocese of Šibenik, two new dioceses were established, one in Duvno, and the other one in Omiš. In Skradin, which became Paul's main seat, the church of St. John the Baptist was built. Paul chose that saint as the protector of his family. A Franciscan monastery of Saint Elizabeth, where his sister Stanislava served as part of the Poor Clares order, was also built in Skradin. In Bribir, the Franciscan church of St. Mary was built, which served as the funerary church of the Šubićs.

The Šubićs invoked the memory of earlier Croatian dukes and kings of the Domagojević and Trpimirović dynasties, in order to portray their rule as a continuity. This was particularly reflected in the invoking of King Demetrius Zvonimir, who ruled Croatia in the 2nd half of the 11th century. A chronicle from the early 14th century about Zvonimir, attributed to the Šubićs, says that Zvonimir was buried in the same funerary church that was used by the Šubićs. In 1302, Paul wrote to the Pope that Croatia was since the times of King Zvonimir the fief of the Holy See. Before 1310, Pope Clement V declared Paul the patron and protector of the monastery of St. Gregory in Vrana, which was donated by Zvonimir to Pope Gregory VII, and then granted to the Knights Templar. There are indications that Paul erected a memorial plaque in the church of St. Mary, in honor of Zvonimir. Stone inscriptions mentioning the 9th century Duke Branimir were restored and placed in newly constructed church buildings.

The dominion of Paul in 1312 (Croatia, Bosnia, and Hum), shortly after the capture of Zadar

At the peak of his power, Paul turned his attention to the city of Zadar, the only Dalmatian coastal city that was not under his control. He maintained close connections with the nobility of Zadar, appointed them on various positions within his realm, and arbitrated in land disputes between the citizens of Zadar and the Bribir County, to which Venice threatened with harsh fines. In 1308, Venice captured the city of Ferrara in northern Italy. As the city was claimed as a part of the Papal States, Pope Clement V laid and interdict on Venice.

In 1310, Venice was faced with a failed attempt by Bajamonte Tiepolo to overthrow the Doge of Venice. Bajamonte then took refugee in Paul's lands. Paul assembled an army in the vicinity of Zadar in the spring of 1310, and remained stationary until an uprising against the Venetian authorities broke out in Zadar in March 1311. Paul's son, Mladen II, was at the head of the army sent to help the rebels, and the Venetians were forced to flee the city. Mladen II was proclaimed Count of Zadar and Prince of Dalmatia (Latin: princeps Dalmacie), as Zadar was considered the capital of Dalmatia. The Doge responded by sending a large fleet to recover the city. Paul informed the Pope about the course of events, asserted that Zadar was "freed from the unlawful Venetian seizure", and referred to Pope's interdict as a pretext for the intervention.

The forces under Mladen's command successfully repelled the attacks. Both Pope Clement V and King Charles Robert protested the attacks on Zadar, and Venice agreed on peace negotiations that began in April 1312. Fighting nonetheless continued, in the course of which the commander of the Venetian fleet was captured. The negotiations were handled by the second son of Paul, George II, and they dragged on after Paul's death. Paul died on 1 May and was buried in the church of St. Mary in Bribir. He was succeeded by his son, Mladen II.

== Family ==
The name of Paul's first wife is not known. Paul married his second wife, Ursa, in 1289. She was probably the sister of Hrvatin Stjepanić, or the daughter of Stefan Dragutin and Catherine of the Árpáds. Ursa died in 1303. In a chronicle about her death, she was referred to as the baness of the Croats.

Paul's two brothers, Mladen I and George I, had a significant influence during his rule. Paul had four sons to whom he gave positions and holdings. His first son was Mladen II, who was Prince of Dalmatia, Count of Zadar, and Ban of Bosnia, and succeeded his father as Ban of Croatia and Lord of Bosnia. He was married to Helen, a relative of the House of Anjou. After his father's death, Mladen kept to himself the title of ban of Bosnia and lord of Hum, and only let his brother George II, the second son of Paul, to participate in the higher level of government. George II was the count of Dalmatian cities. The other two sons, Paul II and Gregory II, were much younger and held lower titles.

== Footnotes ==
Paul I Šubić of Bribir House of Šubić Born: c. 1245 Died: 1 May 1312
Regnal titles
Preceded by Nicholas Gutkeled	Ban of Croatia; 1275–1312	Succeeded by Mladen II Šubić
Preceded by Stephen I Kotromanić	Lord of Bosnia; 1299–1312	Succeeded by Mladen II Šubić
