= Subić =

Subić is a Serbian surname. Notable people with the surname include:

- Aleksandar Subić (born 1993), Bosnian Serb footballer
- Milenka Subić (born 1970), Serbian politician
