= Ostrovica, Croatia =

Village in the Zadar County, Croatia

- Coordinates: 43°57′32″N 15°47′37″E

Area
  - Total: 10.0 km^{2} (3.9 sq mi)

Population (2021)
  - Total: 61
  - Density: 6.1/km^{2} (16/sq mi)

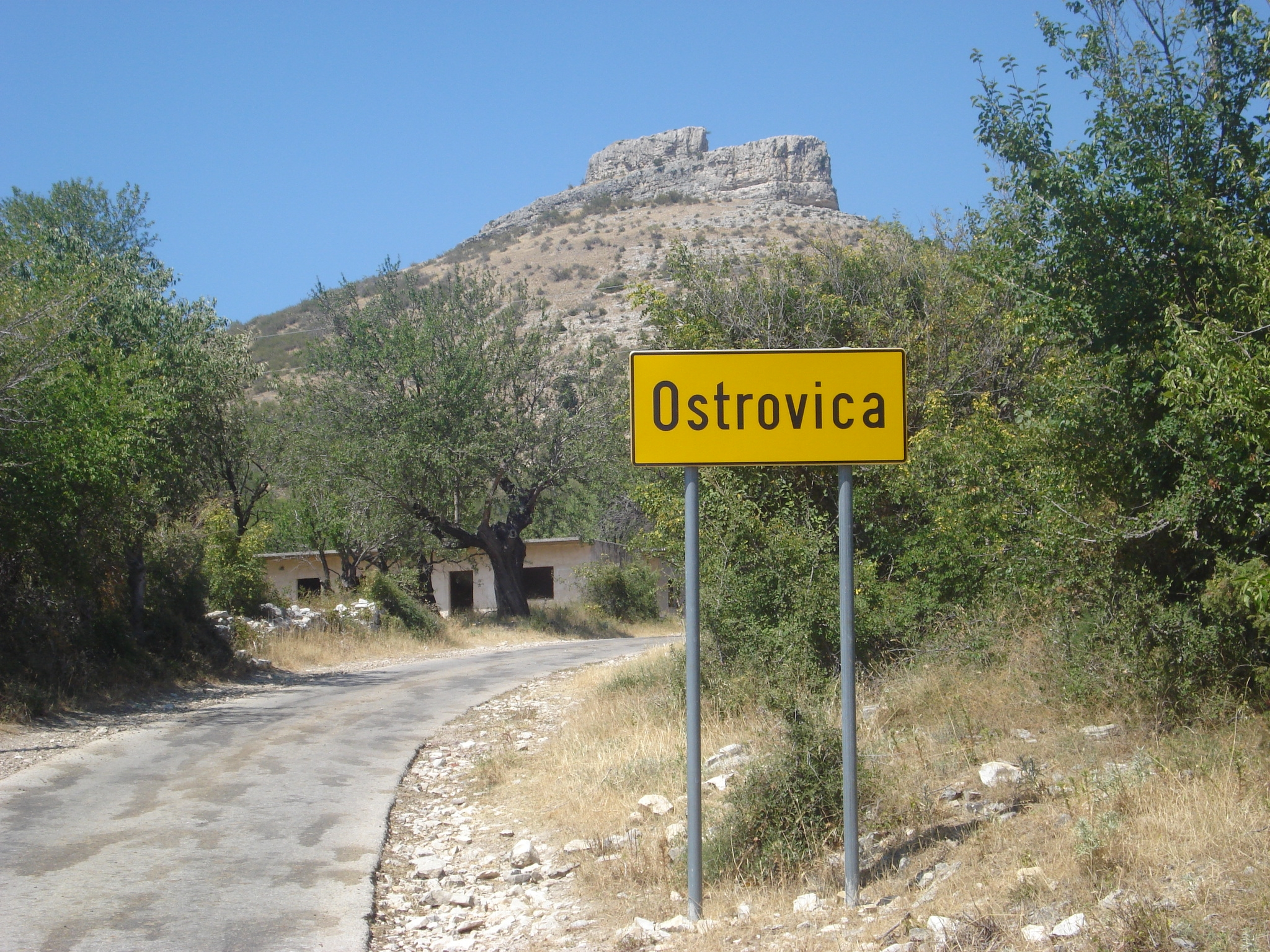
Traffic sign at the village entrance

Ostrovica is a village in Croatia in the Zadar County, in the Lišane Ostrovičke municipality, population 86 (census 2011).

Near the village there is an eponymous ruined medieval castle of the Šubić noble family.

== Notable people ==
- Marko Atlagić
