= Skradin =

- Town
- Grad Skradin; Town of Skradin
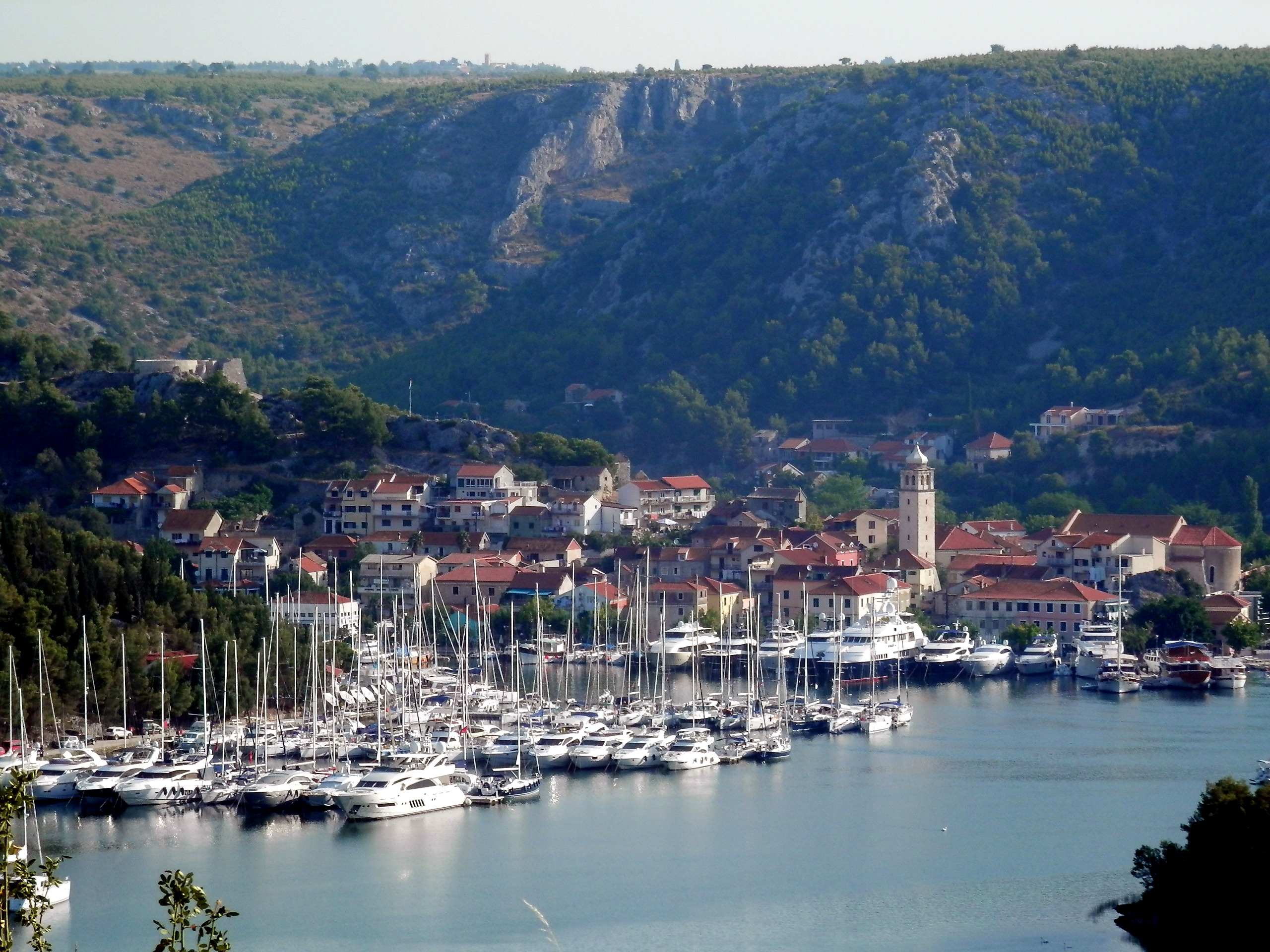
- View of Skradin

- Location of Skradin within Croatia
- Coordinates: 43°49′N 15°55′E
- Country: Croatia
- Region: Dalmatia
- County: Šibenik-Knin County

Government
  - Mayor: Antonijo Brajković (HDZ)

Area
  - Town: 184.2 km^{2} (71.1 sq mi)
  - Urban: 1.1 km^{2} (0.42 sq mi)

Population (2021)
  - Town: 3,349
  - Density: 18.18/km^{2} (47.09/sq mi)
  - Urban: 508
  - Urban density: 460/km^{2} (1,200/sq mi)
- Time zone: UTC+1 (CET)
  - Summer (DST): UTC+2 (CEST)
- Postal code: 22222
- Area code: 022
- Website: grad-skradin.hr

Skradin is a small town in the Šibenik-Knin County of Croatia. It is located near the Krka river and at the entrance to the Krka National Park, 17 km (11 mi) from Šibenik and 100 km (62 mi) from Split. The main attraction of the park, Slapovi Krke, is a series of waterfalls, the biggest of which, Skradinski buk, was named after Skradin.

== History ==
During Antiquity, the city was known as Scardon and Scardona, a name attested in the writings of Strabo and Procopius (Ancient Greek: Σκάρδων), Pliny the Elder (Latin: Scardona) and Ptolemy (Ancient Greek: Σκaρδῶνα).

Before the Roman conquest, the settlement was Illyrian, with the particularity of having the locally recurring suffix -ona. The prevailing theory links the root of the Illyrian toponym to a term meaning "steep", as a derivation of *sko/ard(h)-, and it has been compared with the Scardus mountains in southern Illyria. After an initial development in Vulgar Latin in the form -una, the Illyrian suffix was reflected in South Slavic as -in. The survival of several of such toponyms in the area (e.g. Solin from Salona, Labin from Albona etc) points to the continuation of Illyrian settlements since ancient times. Another, more peripheral, theory says the root of the name might be related to that of the Scordisci, a Celtic or Illyrian tribe. Though initially located in present-day Eastern Slavonia and Syrmia, the Scordisci might have been allied with the local tribe of the Dalmatae, as mercenaries, which would explain their presence in Dalmatia.

After the Roman conquest, Skradin became an administrative and military centre of the region, and was mentioned as a municipium in 530. It was destroyed during the Migration Period in the 7th century, and restored under Croatian rulers in Early Middle Ages.

During the 10th century, it was one of the fortified towns in Croatia, as the centre of the Skradin županija.

=== Skradin under Šubić rule ===
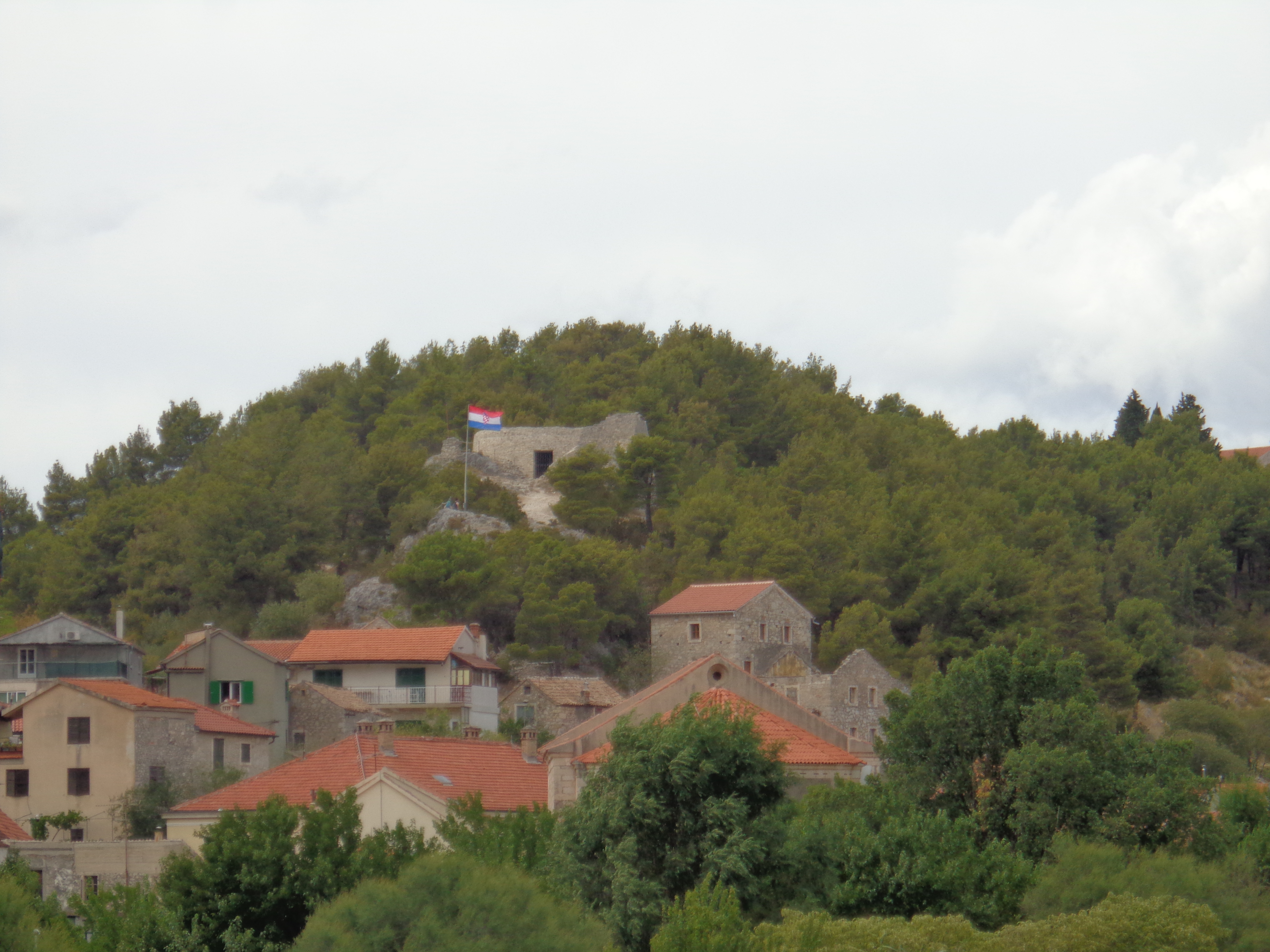
Turina Fortress above the town

In the late 13th and early 14th centuries, Skradin flourished as the capital of the Šubić bans, Paul I and Mladen II. The Šubić's built the Turina fortress on the hill overlooking the Skradin harbor. They elevated the settlement below the fortress to a free city, at which point it also became a commune, and was granted its own statute and administration. They further enriched the city by constructing several richly-endowed monasteries which housed the Dominicans, Franciscans and other Christian orders.

=== Decline and Ottoman conquest ===
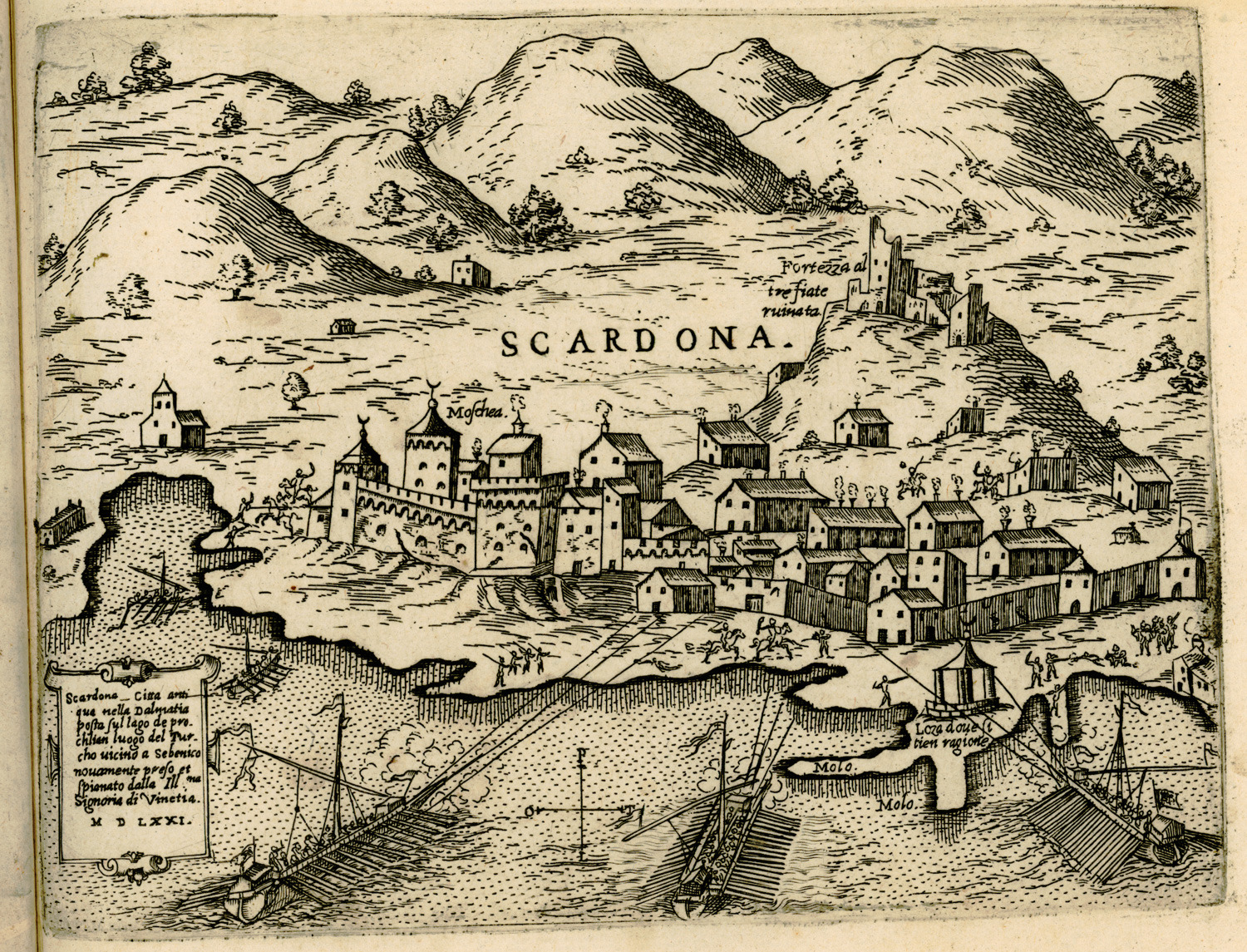
Skradin after Ottoman conquest in 1574

Skradin was conquered by the Ottomans in 1522 and remain part of the Ottoman Empire until 1684, with a few interruptions. During the Ottoman–Venetian wars, the town was devastated and subsequently relocated.

In October 1683, some uskoks from Venetian Dalmatia, mainly Morlachs from Ravni Kotari, rose up against the Sanjak-bey of Klis and took Skradin and several other border towns which had been deserted by their Ottoman Muslim population, who was fearing an attack by the Morlachs. The Venetians finally took Skradin in 1684 and the town recovered under their rule, during the 18th century, becoming the center of a municipality in 1705.

Later, it was occupied by Napoleon as part of the French Empire, then Austria-Hungary.

In time it lost its importance as the centre of the region, which shifted to Šibenik, and so it stagnated - the Diocese of Skradin was abandoned in 1828.

== Population ==
Town of Skradin: Population trends 1857–2021
v

population	4997	5711	5865	6055	7019	7663	8454	8634	9316	10135	10294	9585	8716	8027	3986	3825	3349
	1857	1869	1880	1890	1900	1910	1921	1931	1948	1953	1961	1971	1981	1991	2001	2011	2021

Sources: Croatian Bureau of Statistics publications

The municipality has a total population of 3,349 (2021 census). Its population is divided into the following settlements:

- Bićine, population 173
- Bratiškovci, population 233
- Bribir, population 89
- Cicvare, population 12
- Dubravice, population 509
- Gorice, population 22
- Gračac, population 159
- Ićevo, population 78
- Krković, population 151
- Lađevci, population 99
- Međare, population 5
- Piramatovci, population 209
- Plastovo, population 167
- Rupe, population 392
- Skradin, population 508
- Skradinsko Polje, population 51
- Sonković, population 297
- Vaćani, population 105
- Velika Glava, population 40
- Žažvić, population 29
- Ždrapanj, population 21

== Notable people ==
- Filip Dominik Bordini - priest and bishop
- Lujo Marun - priest and archaeologist
- Josip Mrkica - priest and writer
- Rüstem Pasha - Ottoman leader (birthplace uncertain)
- Zdravko Škender - singer
