= Mladen I Šubić of Bribir =

Croatian nobleman

Ban of Bosnia
- Reign: 1302 – 1304
- Predecessor: Paul I Šubić of Bribir
- Successor: Mladen II Šubić of Bribir
- Died: 1304
- House: House of Šubić
- Father: Stephen II

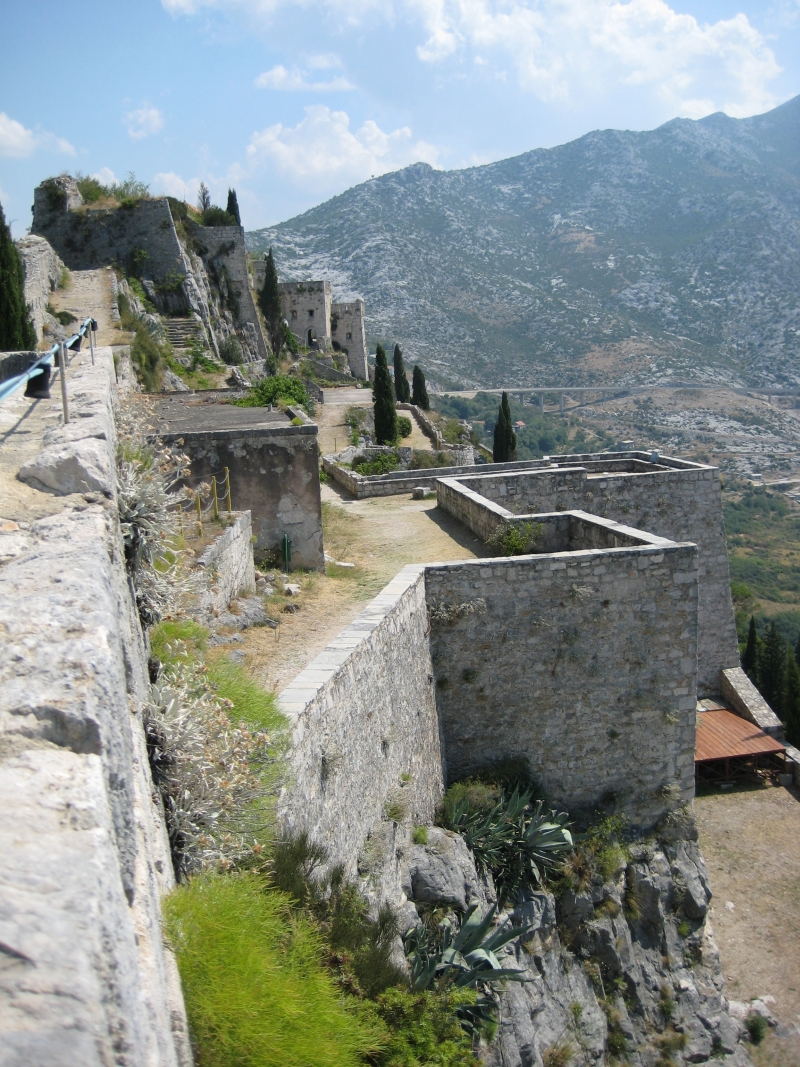
Mladen Šubić ruled from Klis Fortress

Mladen I Šubić of Bribir (Croatian: Mladen I Šubić Bribirski; died 1304) was a Croatian nobleman who was a member of Šubić family, at the end of 13th and beginning of the 14th century.

He was a brother of a ban of Croatia Paul I Šubić of Bribir, who appointed Mladen as a commissar of the Dalmatian city of Split, along with Klis Fortress.

After Paul I Šubić declared himself as "Dominus of Bosnia" in 1299, he gave to Mladen I the title of Bosnian Ban. Stephen Kotroman had resisted the growth of Šubić's power in Bosnia, but had lost by 1300 most control over Bosnia to Mladen I Šubić. After 1302 all of Bosnia was under House of Šubić. Mladen I controlled most of it, and small part of Bosnia land (the Lower Edges) was ruled by Prince Hrvatin Stjepanić, who was a vassal of the House of Šubić, which was confirmed by Charles I of Hungary. Bosnian Ban Mladen I Šubić had started a campaign in Bosnia to exterminate the adherents of the Bosnian Church – the Bogumils. In religious conflict Mladen was killed in a battle during 1304. He was inherited by his nephew Mladen II Šubić, who needed help, so Pavao I Šubić himself had to lead an Army to crush the resistance in Bosnia. In 1305 Pavao I took the title of Lord of all of Bosnia (totius Bosniae dominus).

== See also ==
- Šubić
- List of rulers of Croatia
- List of rulers of Bosnia
- Klis Fortress

Regnal titles
Preceded by Paul I Šubić	Ban of Bosnia; 1302–1304	Succeeded by Mladen II Šubić
