= Bribir, Šibenik-Knin County =

Bribir
- Village
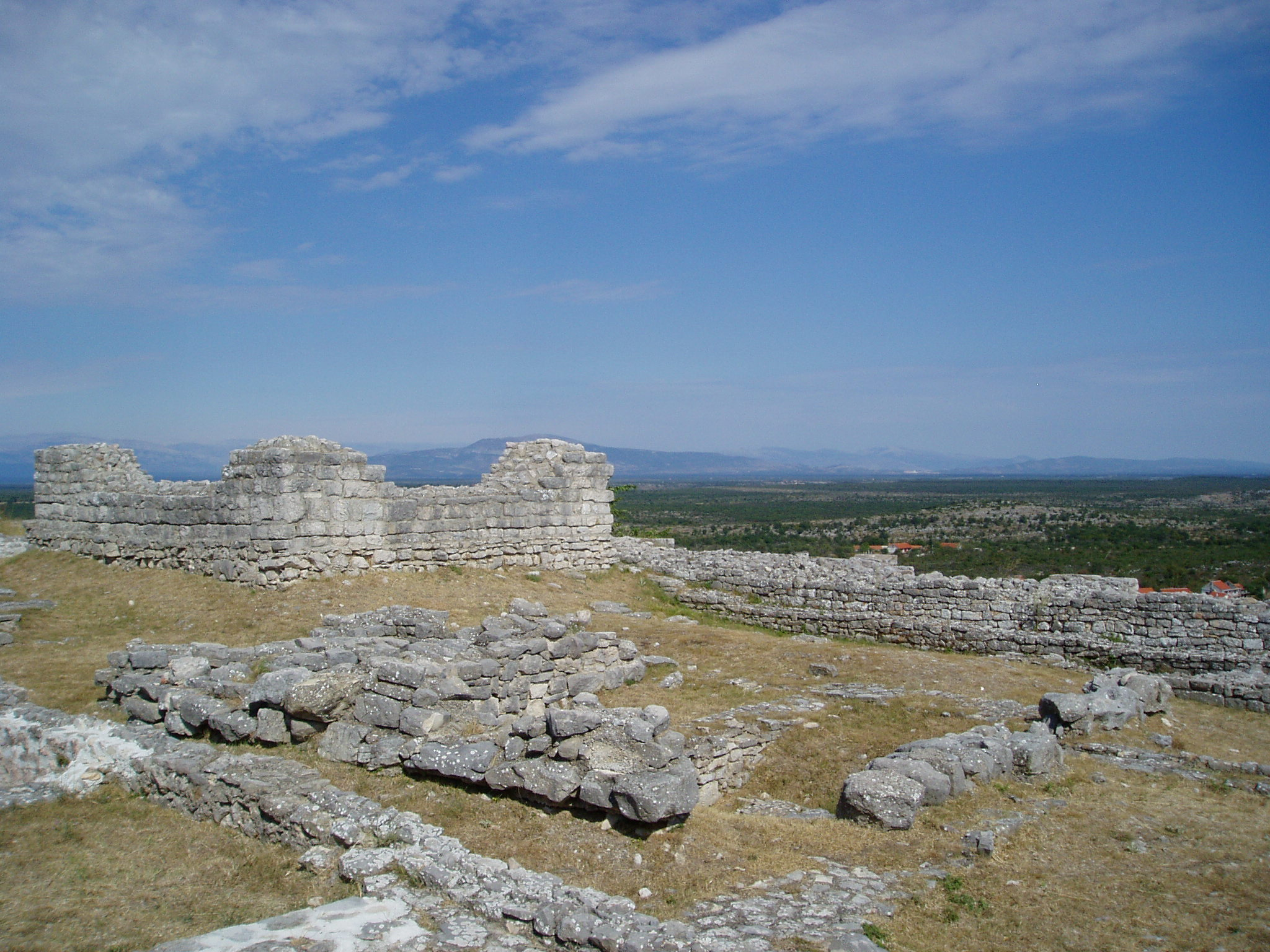
- Archaeological ruins of old Bribir above village

- Location in Croatia
- Coordinates: 43°55′N 15°50′E
- Country: Croatia
- County: Šibenik-Knin County
- Municipality: Skradin

Area
  - Total: 16.0 km^{2} (6.2 sq mi)
- Elevation: 229 m (751 ft)

Population (2021)
  - Total: 89
  - Density: 5.6/km^{2} (14/sq mi)
- Time zone: UTC+1 (CET)
  - Summer (DST): UTC+2 (CEST)
- Postal code: 22223

Bribir is a village in Šibenik-Knin County, near the town of Skradin, in southern Croatia. In its location in the Roman period was town Varvaria, while during the medieval times it was an important and rich settlement with a stronghold and Franciscan monastery, a capital city of power of the Šubić family.

== Geography ==
The village is located at the foot of the hill of Bribir, in the Ravni Kotari geographical region. It is 14 km from Skradin. The old Bribir is on a hill 305 m high, located nearby the main medieval road that linked Zadar and Knin, because of which with near Ostrovica, was given name of "the key to Zadar".

== History ==
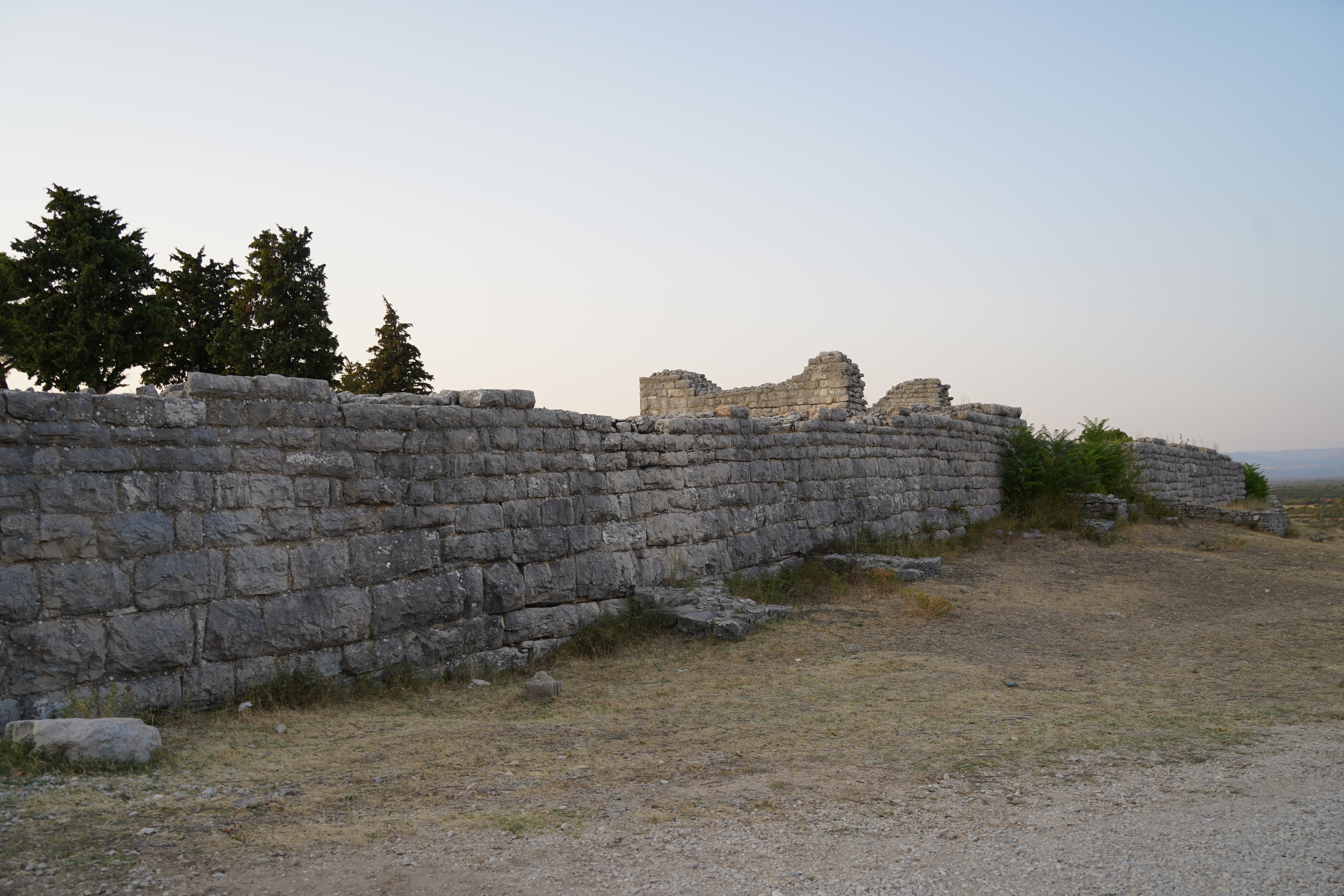
Big walls dating to ancient Varvaria.

In its surroundings were found sites dating to Paleolithic, Neolithic, Eneolithic and early Bronze Age. Up until the Roman conquest, the Liburnians had inhabited the region and built the settlement at the hill of Bribir (Croatian: Bribirska glavica), which is now an archaeological site. After the Roman conquest in 1st century AD, it was known as the town (municipium) of Varvaria. It had big city walls encompassing more than 7 hectares. Pliny the Elder mentioned Varvarini as one of 14 municipalities under the jurisdiction of Scardona (Skradin).

In the migration period, after the fall of the Western Roman Empire, the region switched hands, being occupied by the Croats. Its territory and nearby river Guduča were possibly related to the activity of Borna and Guduscani in the 9th century. In De Administrando Imperio (950s), Berber is one of the counties part of Littoral Croatia. Since the 11th century it was the capital of power of the Croatian noble Šubić family, who were initially called nobiles, comites or principes Breberienses (Princes of Breber, Croatian: Knezovi bribirski). Bribir achieved its peak in the 13th and 14th century, during the period when the members of family ruled over Croatia as the Bans of Croatia. In 1347, King Louis I strengthened his position in Dalmatia by taking the strategically important fortress of Ostrovica, near Bribir, from the Šubić family and in return gave to them estates in the vicinity of Zrin.

By the end of the 14th century it was losing prominence as the centre of the county (moved to Ostrovica), but continued to be the centre of activity of already branched family which ruled over it in the 15th century. In the early 16th century, Šubić's family with native population had to flee when it was conquered in 1523 by the Ottomans. It is not known how the town fell. The Orthodox population in the 16th century started to settled beneath the hill where is the location of the current village which was founded in the beginning of the 18th century. Bribir was under Venetian rule from 1684, and centuries later was part of the war-time Republic of Serbian Krajina (1991–1995).

== Buildings and monuments ==
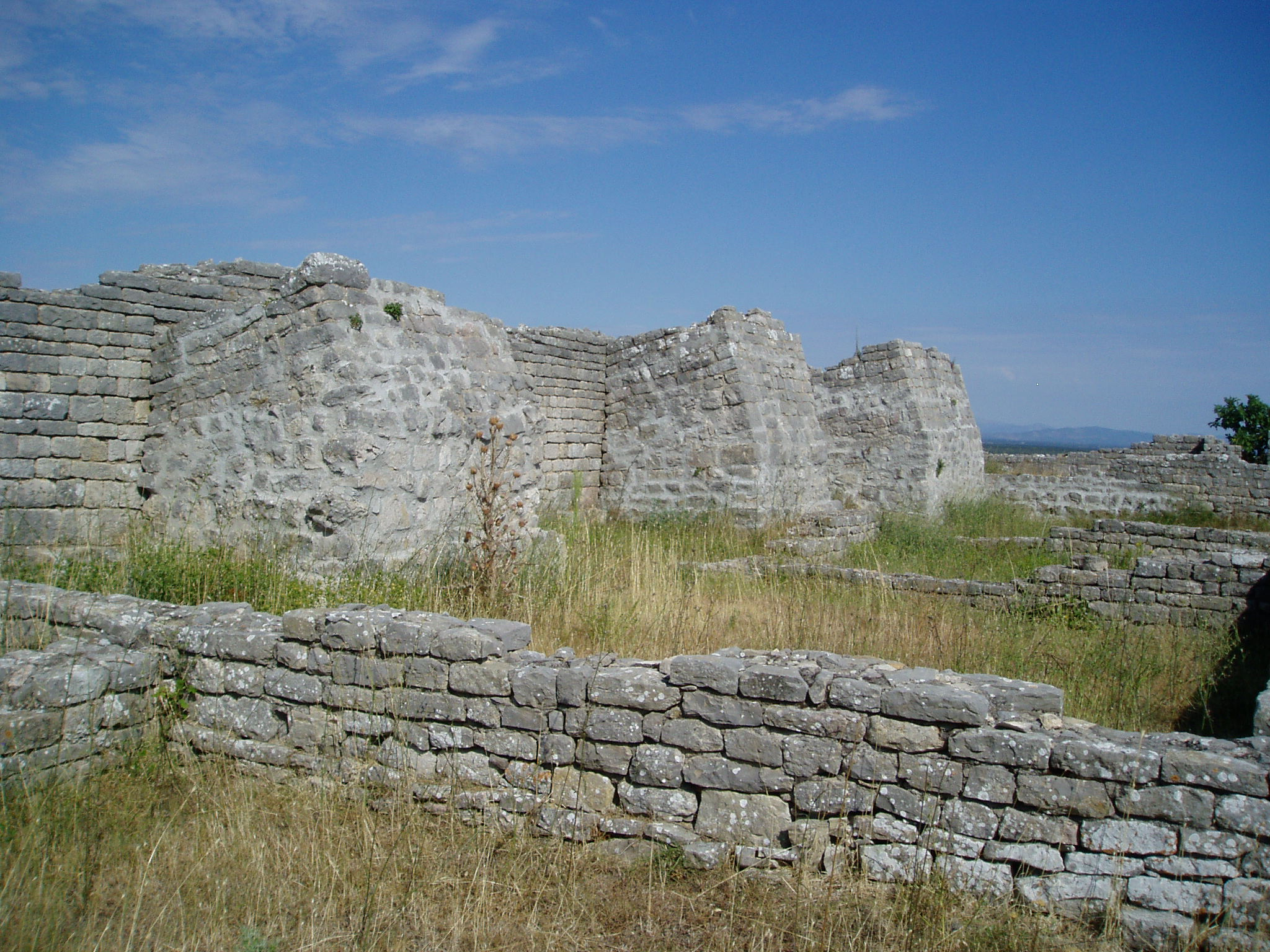
Ruins of church and Franciscan monastery of St. Mary.

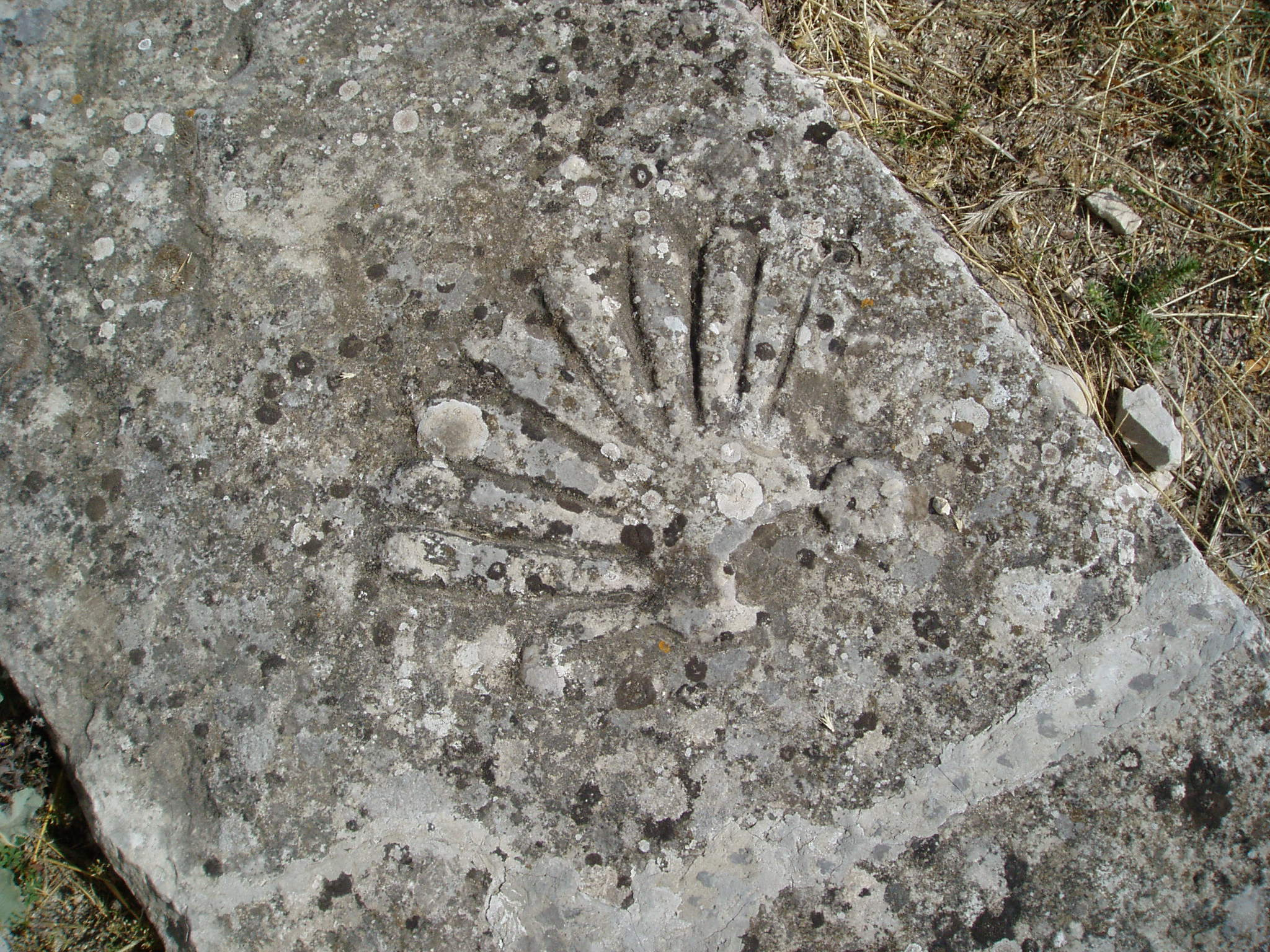
Šubić family coat of arms.

Due to its rich history, on the surroundings of the village can be seen remains of Roman and medieval buildings, Roman-era city-walls, late antique rotunda and Early Christian mausoleum with sarcophagi, nymphaeum with mosaics, early medieval cemetery Vratnice from ca. 9th century (where were found Old-Croatian archaeological artifacts).

The Šubić's built a large palace on the hill of Bribir, an ideal place to control the surrounding territory, overseeing all roads and approaches from the sea (from Zadar to Šibenik) to the hinterland (from Velebit to Svilaja near Knin). They founded the Romanesque-style church of St. John the Evangelist (first mentioned from 1229), which was the seat of Bribir archpresbyter.

Paul I Šubić of Bribir (reign 1260s–1312) founded the Gothic-style church of St. Mary and Franciscan monastery in the end of the 13th century or beginning of the 14th century (first mentioned from 1327), with the church being "the most representative Franciscan church in the continental part of Dalmatia" and the first Franciscan monastery in the Dalmatian hinterland (among its monks being Nicholas Tavelic). By its dimension and richness it exceeded the needs of the local population, but it was an example of power, social and economic prestige of both the family and Bribir, making it a cultural and religious centre in the hinterland. In the 15th century were still hired the best craftsmen to work in the church, like Petar Radmilov from Šibenik and Vidul Ivanov and his sons Nikola, Juraj, Jakov and Fran Vidulić from Zadar. The church was also a mausoleum of the Šubić family (at least 30 named people were buried there, were also found graves and a gravestone with the family's coat of arms). In the church probably were placed also two memorial plaques, one dedicated to Paul I, while the second to king Demetrius Zvonimir of Croatia (who was buried there according to the legend of his death). Part of the church and monasteries inventory was preserved by Franciscans in the monastery of St. Francis in Šibenik.

During the same period the three small churches of St. Nicholas, St. Stephen and St. Saviour were built. All these and previous churches were almost completely in ruins by the 17th century. On the place of one medieval church, in 1574 was built Serbian Orthodox Church of St. Joachim and Anne.

== Demographic history ==
Village of Bribir: Population trends 1857–2021
v

population	396	590	405	440	459	550	630	663	680	723	706	580	568	549	79	103	89
	1857	1869	1880	1890	1900	1910	1921	1931	1948	1953	1961	1971	1981	1991	2001	2011	2021

Sources: Croatian Bureau of Statistics publications

In the 2011 census, the village had 103 inhabitants.

Ethnic composition
Ethnic group	1961	1971	1981	1991
Serbs	665	528	454	517 (94.17%)
Croats	37	18	28	21 (3.82%)
Others	4	34	86	11
Total	706	580	568	549
