= Šubić family =

Noble family

Šubić
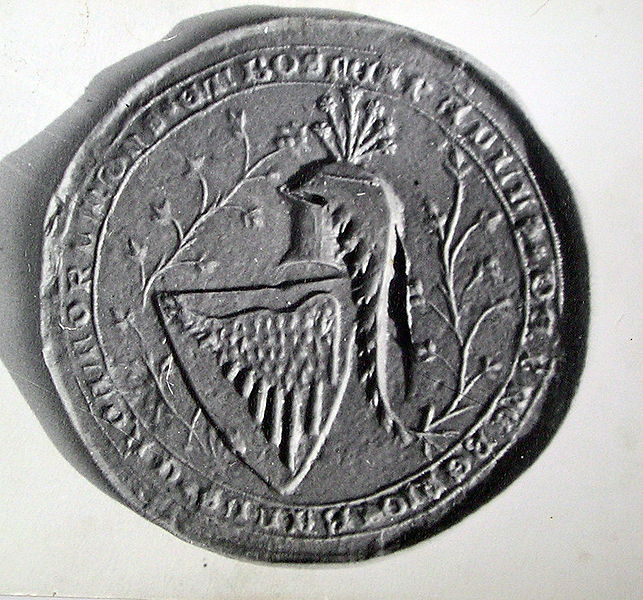
- Country: Croatia: Vassal to Kingdom of Croatia (1000s–1526); Vassal to Kingdom of Hungary (1102–1526)
- Founded: 11th century
- Titles: Župan; Count of Bribir; Ban of Croatia; Ban of Bosnia
- Cadet branches: Banić, Zrinski, Ugrinić, Peranski, Obradić, Marković

The Šubić family, also known initially as Bribirščić (Berberistich, Broborstic, Breberstic, Breberienses), was one of the Twelve noble tribes of Croatia and a great noble house which constituted Croatian statehood in the Middle Ages. They held the county of Bribir (Varvaria) in inland Dalmatia. With their prominent branch Zrinski (1347–1703), they were arguably the leading noble family of Croatia for almost 500 years.

== History ==
=== Origins ===
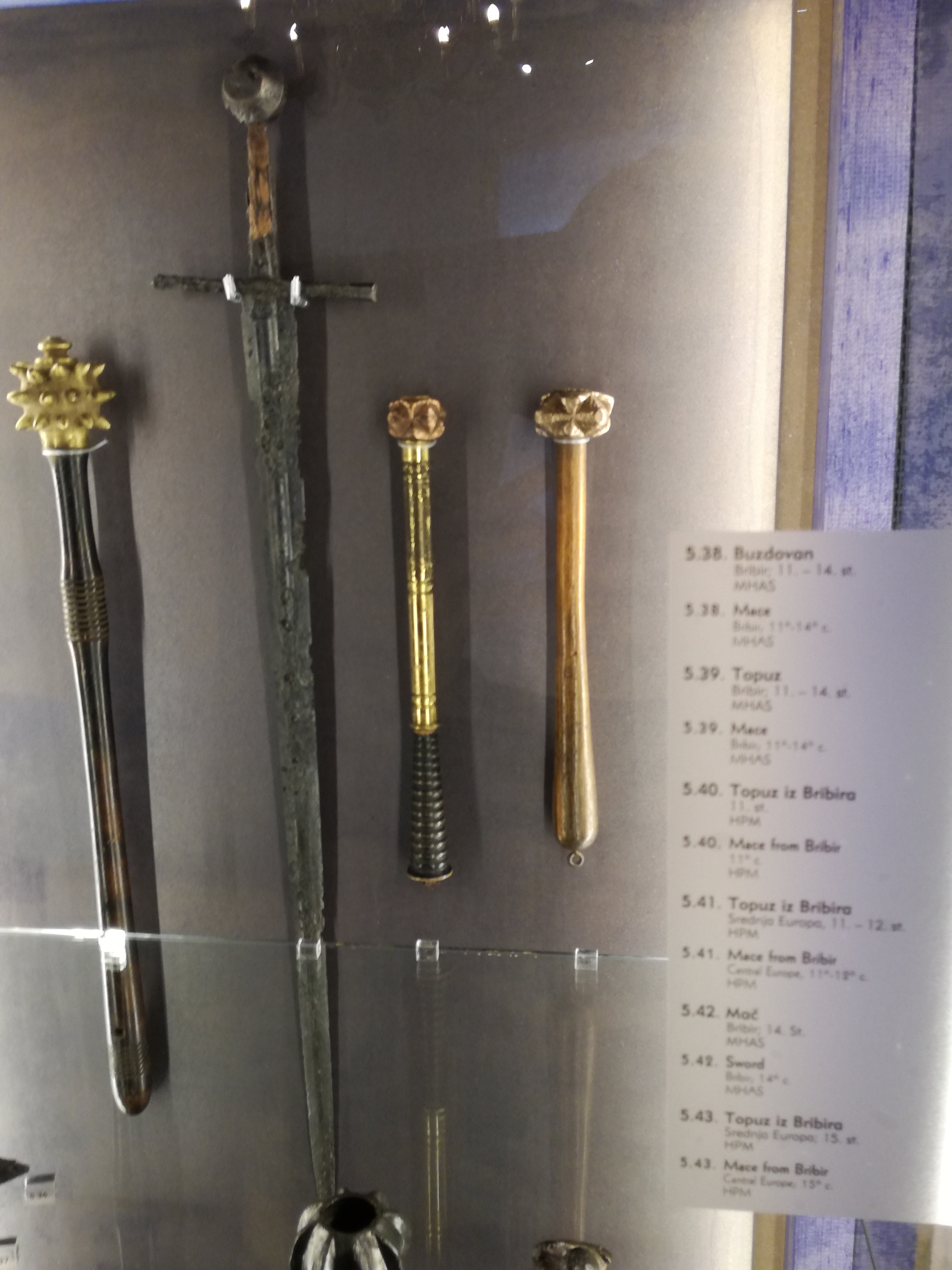
11th-14th century weapons from Bribir, seat of the Šubić (Paul I Šubić of Bribir)

Today Bribir is an archaeological site in inland Dalmatia. It is located on a flat hill about fifteen kilometres northwest of Skradin, near the old Zadar road which goes through Benkovac. Under the steep rocks of its western side there is the source of the Bribirčica stream and from here the rich and fertile Bribir-Ostrovica field spreads out. The hill of Bribir, an ideal place to control the surrounding territory, was a perfect area to inhabit. The one who held it had control over all roads and approaches from the sea to the hinterland, making it an ideal settlement.

During the Roman period Bribir, known as Varvaria, had the status of municipium and was the centre of one of the fourteen Liburnian counties. The Byzantine emperor Constantine Porphyrogenitus wrote in the 10th century about the Croats settling in Dalmatia in the 7th century and described how they had organised their country into eleven counties (zupanias) one of which was Breberi, centred on site of the old Varvaria (Moravcsik & Jenkins, eds. 1967). A line of hills separated it from the territory of Knin to the north and to the south it bordered on Skradin. It was held by a kindred that in coeval documents is referred to as nobiles, comites or principes Breberienses (nobles, counts or rulers of Breber, "knezovi Bribirski" in Croatian). These Breberienses belonged to the Šubić tribe from Luka županija, one of the twelve tribes which composed Croatian statehood in the Middle Ages, and according to the Supetar Cartulary, they were one of six tribes which selected bans who, in turn, elected a new king in a case where the prior king died without leaving heirs. In 1182 was mentioned noble Tolimir filius Stephani Subici in the hinterland of Zadar, in 1248 some noble Subinich were on the island of Krk, while Mladen III Banić (1342) and Paul III Banić (1345) were first members of the main line of Bribir to be called seu generationis Subichievich.

=== Original coat of arms ===
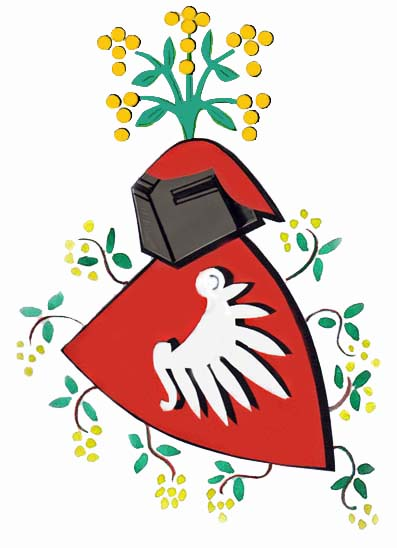
Coat of Arms of the Šubić noble family

The original coat of arms of this clan of nobles is a wing argent on a shield gules. The crest is a sprig of barberry. Argent and gules were the colours of the Croatian kindreds that sided with the papal party such as the lords of Krk (before they took on the shield of the Roman Frangipani), the Gusić, the Mogorović and the Hrvatinić, and still are those of Croatia.

The device could be derived from the winged shield standard of the royal chamberlain, a post held by Budez postelnic berberensis jupanus (1069). Wings are common, especially as a crest, in later Croatian heraldry. This could be accounted by the numerous familiares of the powerful Zrins who kept the Breber device in their coat of arms.

=== Timeline ===
In recent history books whenever members of this kindred are mentioned in relation to their prominent role in the 13th and 14th centuries the surname of Šubić is conferred upon them by the historian. This was not the way that the members called themselves at the time. During the Middle Ages every man in Croatia bore four names: the name given at baptism, the patronym, the name of his kindred which was also the name of the settlement in which he lived, and his tribal affiliation (Jirecek, 1967). When, with the introduction of feudalism, king Bela confirmed the kindred in their possession of Breber (1251) this name would again be used to identify them since by then the custom was to be called after one's premier fief. Thus, in the period from 1069 to the destruction of the county by the Turks in 1520, the many personages of the clan that emerge from the original Latin documents qualify themselves as de Breberio preceded by their Christian name and patronym; only rarely do they add their tribal affiliation.

The seal of Paul I Šubić of Bribir (born in 1312), the greatest figure of the clan, has the following lettering on it:

+ S(IGILLVM) PAVLI BREBERIENSIS BANI TOCIVS SCLAVONIE

Another seal of the same man has:

PAVLVS DE BREBERIO BANVS CROATORVM D[OMI]N[V]S ET BOSNE

Thus, in the vulgar the surname would be Breber or some variant (Breberić, Brebrić, Barbier, Barber, Barberich, etc.). The 19th century erudite Croatian historians who wrote the first history books for the public opted for Šubić which, in the ardent nationalistic spirit of the time, sounded reassuringly Slavic as compared to Breber.

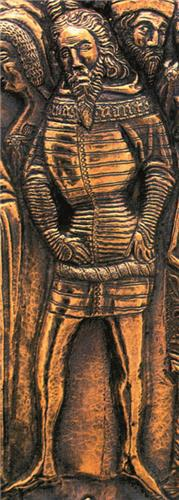
Paul I, Ban (viceroy) of Croatia

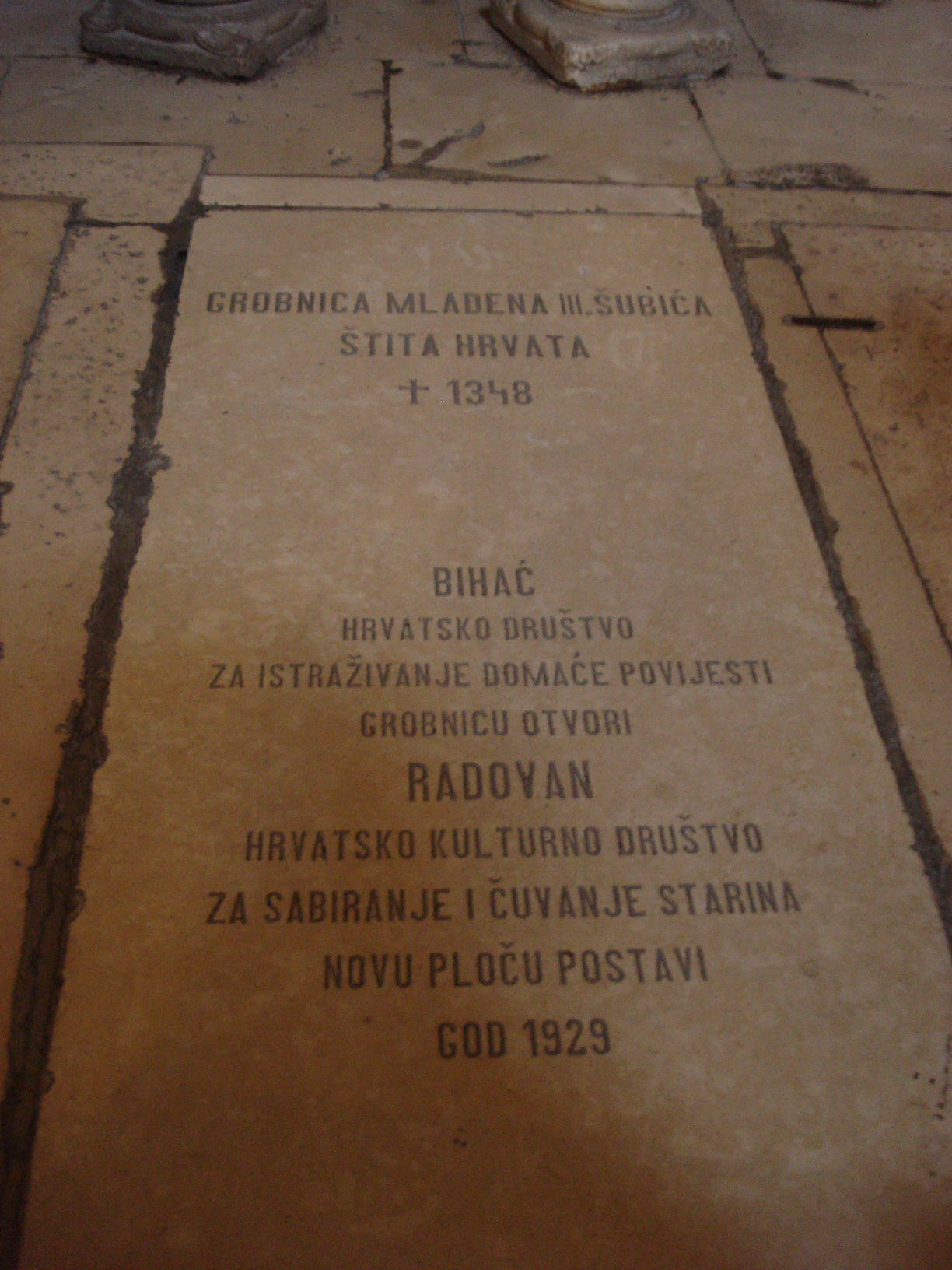
Mladen III Šubić of Bribir gravestone in the Trogir Cathedral

During the reign of Demetrius Zvonimir (1075–1089), the mythical golden age of the Kingdom of Croatia, the highest court offices of postelnik (comes camerarius) and tepizo (comes palatinus) were held by Budez and Dominicus, both of the lineage. During the 13th and 14th centuries Brebers were many times called to cover the post of count in the townships of Split, Trogir, Skradin and Omiš, primarily clashing with Domald of Sidraga, Kačić and Nelipić family. In the documents, it is possible to identify six different branches of the Breber clan. The most illustrious of which is the one descended from iupanus Miroslaus Brebriensis, filius Bogdanizi (1184). His great-grandson Paul, mentioned above, reached the peak of power towards the end of the 13th century. He was Ban of Croatia and Dalmatia, his rule extended to Bosnia, and with his brothers he controlled the maritime cities of Dalmatia. In these regions he was champion of the Pope and was instrumental in placing Charles, the firstborn of the King of Naples, on the throne of Hungary and Croatia. He was related to the King of Naples, the King of Serbia, the Da Camino lords of Treviso, and the Tiepolo and Dandolo patricians of Venice. When he died in 1312, his eldest son Mladen tried to maintain the hold over the other Croatian clans, but was unsuccessful and bit by bit lost land, castles and towns.

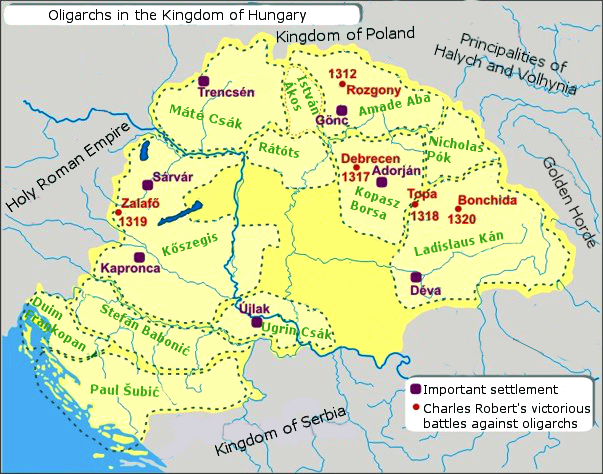
The provinces ruled by the "oligarchs" (powerful lords) in the early 14th century

The dominion of Mladen in 1312, following Paul I's death

=== Decline ===
Besides these particular offshoots which went their separate ways, a numerous kin continued to abide by the ancient holding of Breber. In 1324 when the citizenship of Zadar was conferred on the nobiles domini de Briberio, 190 members of the clan presented themselves for the investiture. In 1353 the Ottoman Turks crossed the Dardanelles and began their invasion of Europe. In the 15th century Bosnia was already a pashalik from where raids would be carried into Croatia-Dalmatia. The feudal levies and the clan warriors had no hope against the Turkish war machine and met their fate in the battle of Krbavsko Polje (1493). The castle of Breber was caught on the front between the Turkish, Hungarian and Venetian armies and by 1520 had become a desolate waste of rubble. Last news giving the comites Breberienses still in their ancient seat is in the diocesan synod of Skradin held at the time of bishop Archangel (1490–1502). The Turkish terror displaced large portions of the population of Dalmatia-Croatia. Some sought refuge in the cities of the coast, some crossed the sea to Italy, others, especially those belonging to the nobility, resettled to the north in that part of Slavonia still under the crown of Hungary-Croatia. Their clan organisation definitely disrupted, the single Breber families settled in various places in the county of Zagreb (Comitatus Zagrabiensis) (Adamcek & Kampus, 1976). In the second half of the 16th century we find one nucleus settled in Turopolje (Campus Zagrabiensis) where they joined the free community of lesser nobles (nobiles unius sessionis). Another group established itself at Stubica and other places in the Zagorje region, where one branch, the counts Jankovic Bribirsky, owned the Horvatska manor in the 17th century and remained one of the prominent local families till the 20th century. Breber families are still living in these places to this day.

== Noble branches ==
=== Zrinski branch ===
In 1347 King Louis I of Hungary conferred on this branch of the Brebers, in the persons of Count Gregory and Count George (Grgur and Juraj in Croatian), respectively son and nephew of Ban Paul, the Zrin Castle (in exchange for the strategically important castle of Ostrovica, their last holding outside of ancestral Bribir. This branch would be known by the surname of Zrin (but also variously a Zrinio, Zrinski, Zrínyi, Zrini, de Serin, Sdrin following Latin, contemporary Croatian, Hungarian, French, or Italian usage) which rose to its height of fame and glory with Count Nikola IV (1508–1566), the hero of Szigetvár, and with Count Nikola VII (1620–1664), the Scourge of the Ottomans.

Mark Forstall (or Marcus Forstall), the secretary of the latter, compiled a history of the Zrins, tracing it back to the Brebers, to the tribe of Šubić, and from there to the Roman gens Sulpicia which, according to Suetonius, sprang from the love of Zeus for Pasiphaë. Even the illustrious erudite Charles Ducange (1610–1688) mentions these fabulous origins in his Illyrici Veteris et Novi, p. 237:

Dynastae in Zrinio magno semper in Dalmatia, et in Croatia potentatu gaudebant, primum ante anno 1347. Breberiensium, deinde Zriniorum nomine cogniti: Comites Breberienses ex antiquo Sulpitorum Romanorum genere orti, Subich a Dalmatis patrio cognominabantur sermone.

A feeling for classical antiquity was a cultural feature of the Renaissance and the wish to establish a link with the great tradition of Rome was a common vanity of those times. The claim of the Zrins, however, is not totally groundless. During the times of the Roman Empire, Dalmatia was a senatorial province and would have affiliations with the patrician families of the capital. P. Sulpicius Rufus was governor of Illyricum around 45 B.C. and could have established a settlement of clientes here, as was the general custom during Roman rule. Varvaria was a Roman municipium under Italic law but was actually enrolled in the tribe Claudia. Archaeological evidence at Bribir shows no sign of interruption of human occupation between the Roman municipium and the arrival of the Croats. This belonging of the Breberienses to the universe of Rome is revealed by their emergence to power in the time when Croatia was placed under papal suzerainty during the reign of Zvonimir (1075–1089), and also when later they bitterly fought and defeated (1227) the Kacic kindred, champions of the heretical party. And later still when the Pope would address ban Mladen as dilectus filius (1319). Other kindreds and families in Croatia and Dalmatia like the Karin, the Babonić, the Frankopan, the Gusić and some of the patrician families from the maritime cities also claimed a similar link with Rome.

Count Martino Zrinski or Sdrigna, was born in 1462 and was the son of Count Peter II and brother of Nikola III, father of Nikola IV, the one who is referred to in history as Nikola the Great Zrinski of Siget (Szigetvár in Hungarian). Martino Zrinski was the first member of the Zrinski family to live in Cefalonia, Greece. He adopted the name of Sdrin or Sdrinia.

=== Other branches ===
Another branch of the Breber clan, descended from Peter living at the beginning of the 14th century, owed its rise to having remained unshakeably loyal to Sigismund of Luxemburg, the future Holy Roman Emperor (1411), in his struggle for the crown of Hungary-Croatia against King Ladislaus of Naples. Nikola, James and John, nobiles de Breberio, were confirmed in their possessions. James was nominated Viceban. The family also received the castle of Perna with all the appurtenances. This family was then known as Perényi (Peranski in Croatian, or Peransky, de Perén, a Pernya in other languages) and was numbered among the magnates of Hungary up to the 20th century. Gabriel Perényi and bishop Francis Perényi fell fighting in the fateful Battle of Mohács (29 August 1526).

Another family branch that rose to wealth and power were the descendants of Ugrinus (died 1335). Known under the nickname of Melić, then Melith, which later became their surname, they obtained vast estates in Transylvania.

== Members of the House of Šubić ==
- Stjepko Šubić, Count of Trogir
  - Pavao I Šubić of Bribir (1245–1312), Count of Bribir, Ban of Croatia and Lord of all Bosnia
    - Mladen II Šubić of Bribir (1270–1343), Count of Bribir, Ban of Croatia, Ban of Bosnia and Lord of the all Bosnia
      - Katarina Šubić (?–1358), married Duke of Legnica-Brzeg Bolesław III the Generous in 1326.
    - Juraj II Šubić of Bribir (1275–1330), Count of Bribir and Split, ruled from Klis Fortress
      - Pavao III Šubić of Bribir (?–1356), married Catherina Dandolo from Venice
      - Katarina Šubić, married Ivan Jurišić Bribirski
      - Deodat Šubić (?–1348)
      - Mladen III Šubić of Bribir (1315–1348), "Shield of the Croats", ruled from Klis Fortress, married Jelena Nemanjić, a daughter of Stephen Uroš III of Serbia
        - Mladen IV Šubić of Bribir
          - Senko Šubić of Bribir
            - Radics
            - Bielak
      - Jelena Šubić (1306–1378), married to Vladislaus of Bosnia, regent of medieval Bosnia.
    - Pavao II Šubić of Bribir (?–1346), Count of Trogir and Ostrovica, married Elizabeth Frankopan (Elizabeta Krčka)
      - Juraj III Šubić of Bribir (Juraj I Zrinski) (?–1362)
        - Elizabeth, married Tamás of Corbavia
        - Pavao (1414)
      - Pribko
      - Katharina, a nun
    - Grgur I Šubić of Bribir, Count of Šibenik
  - Juraj I Šubić of Bribir (1277–1302), Count of Trogir, Šibenik, Omiš and Nin, ruled from Klis Fortress
    - Ivan (1358)
  - Mladen I Šubić of Bribir (?–1304), Count of Split, Ban of Bosnia (Dominus of Bosnia), ruled from Klis Fortress after Juraj I's death
  - Stanislava Šubić (?–1304), a beatified noblewoman and nun
  - a daughter (1330–?), married to Jacopo Tiepolo

== See also ==
- Croatian nobility
- List of noble families of Croatia
- Twelve noble tribes of Croatia
- List of rulers of Croatia
- List of rulers of Bosnia
- Šubic, Slovenian surname

== List of consulted works ==
- The expanding Šubić family, the princes of Bribir, in the book Southeastern Europe in the Middle ages, 500-1250 - Author: Florin Curta
- Croatian scientific bibliography: Supporting the Angevin pretenders - the Šubić of Bribir and installation of the Angevins in the Kingdom of Hungary-Croatia - Author: Damir Karbi
- Princes of Bribir in the medieval Croatian state
- Croatian noblemen of Šubić, the princes of Bribir, in the book Croatia, Bosnia and Herzegovina and the Serbian claims - Author: Martin Davorin Krmpotić
- Princes of Bribir in the Croatian history, chapter The Extinction of the Arpad Dynasty - Author: Marko Marelić
- Epitaph of Mladen III Šubić, prince of Bribir
- Rady M. 2000. Nobility, Land and Service in Medieval Hungary. Palgrave ed. 231 pp.
