= Nelipić family =

Medieval Croatian noble family

Nelipić
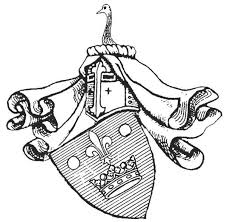
- Parent house: Snačić
- Country: Croatia in personal union with Hungary
- Founded: fl. 1244
- Founder: Nelipac
- Current head: extinct
- Titles: Count; Ban; Duke
- Estates: of the Lower Edges, Dalmatia, Bosnia
- Dissolution: 1436

The Nelipić family, also called Nelipac or Nelipčić, was a medieval Croatian noble family from the Dalmatian Hinterland. They were greatly involved in political situations in Dalmatia, and in Bosnia. At their greatest extent during the 14th and 15th century, they ruled areas in inner Croatia from mountain Velebit to Cetina river. They emerged as descendants of the Snačić gentis.

== Rise of the Nelipić family's power ==
The rise of the Nelipić family's power was harmonized with the fall of the Šubić family's influence, with whom the Nelipić family continued to have tense relations and frequent skirmishes with during the 1330s. When George II Šubić died between 1328 and 1330, he was succeeded by his son Mladen III Šubić. Pressure from Ivan Nelipić, including his capture of Ostrovica and various lesser Šubić places, led Mladen III and his uncle Paul II to make peace with the Nelipić family.

== Notable members ==
- Nelipac
  - Isan Nelipić
    - Juraj Nelipić
      - Ivan Nelipić, Duke of Knin, married Vladislava Kurjaković
        - Ivan II Nelipić, Duke of Cetina, married Margareta Merini
          - Konstantin Nelipić
            - Nelipac
          - Ivaniš Nelipić, Duke of Trogir (1393), of Split (1403), married Erzsébet Bebek
            - Katarina Nelipić, married Ivan VI Frankopan
            - Margarita Nelipić, married Grgur Kurjaković
          - Jelena Nelipić, Queen of Bosnia

== See also ==
- Croatian nobility
- List of noble families of Croatia
- List of rulers of Croatia
- History of Croatia
