= Louis I of Hungary =

King of Hungary and Croatia from 1342 to 1382

Louis I
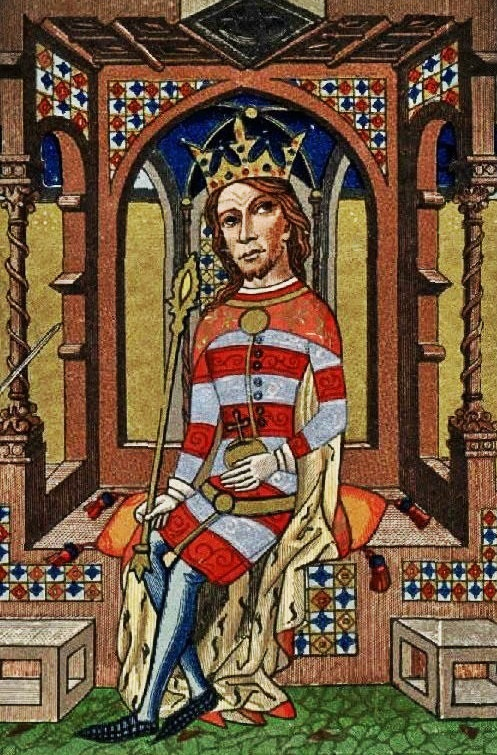
- Louis I as depicted in the Chronicon Pictum

King of Hungary and Croatia
- Reign: 16 July 1342 – 10 September 1382
- Coronation: 21 July 1342, Székesfehérvár
- Predecessor: Charles I
- Successor: Mary

King of Poland
- Reign: 17 November 1370 – 10 September 1382
- Coronation: 17 November 1370, Kraków Cathedral
- Predecessor: Casimir III
- Successor: Jadwiga
- Born: 5 March 1326; Visegrád, Kingdom of Hungary
- Died: 10 September 1382 (aged 56); Nagyszombat, Kingdom of Hungary (now Trnava, Slovakia)
- Burial: 16 September 1382; Székesfehérvár Basilica
- Spouses: Margaret of Bohemia; Elizabeth of Bosnia
- Issue: Catherine of Hungary; Mary, Queen of Hungary; Hedwig, Queen of Poland
- House: Anjou
- Father: Charles I of Hungary
- Mother: Elizabeth of Poland

Louis I, also known as Louis the Great (Hungarian: Nagy Lajos; Croatian: Ludovik Veliki; Slovak: Ľudovít Veľký) or Louis the Hungarian (Polish: Ludwik Węgierski, Italian: Luigi l'ungherese; 5 March 1326 – 10 September 1382), was King of Hungary and Croatia from 1342 and King of Poland from 1370 until his death in 1382. He was the first child of Charles I of Hungary and his wife, Elizabeth of Poland, to survive infancy. A 1338 treaty between his father and Casimir III of Poland, Louis's maternal uncle, confirmed Louis's right to inherit the Kingdom of Poland if his uncle died without a son. In exchange, Louis was obliged to assist his uncle in reoccupying the lands that Poland had lost in previous decades. He bore the title Duke of Transylvania between 1339 and 1342 but did not administer the province.

Louis was of age when he succeeded his father in 1342, but his deeply religious mother exerted a powerful influence on him. He inherited a centralised kingdom and a rich treasury from his father. During the first years of his reign, Louis launched a crusade against the Lithuanians and restored royal power in Croatia; his troops defeated a Tatar army, expanding his authority towards the Black Sea. When his brother, Andrew, Duke of Calabria, husband of Queen Joanna I of Naples, was assassinated in 1345, Louis accused the queen of his murder and punishing her became the principal goal of his foreign policy. He launched two campaigns to the Kingdom of Naples between 1347 and 1350. His troops occupied large territories on both occasions, and Louis adopted the styles of Neapolitan sovereigns (including the title of King of Sicily and Jerusalem), but the Holy See never recognised his claim. Louis's arbitrary acts and atrocities committed by his mercenaries made his rule unpopular in Southern Italy. He withdrew all his troops from the Kingdom of Naples in 1351.

Like his father, Louis administered Hungary with absolute power and used royal prerogatives to grant privileges to his courtiers. However, he also confirmed the liberties of the Hungarian nobility at the Diet of 1351, emphasising the equal status of all noblemen. At the same Diet, he introduced an entail system and a uniform rent payable by the peasants to the landowners, and confirmed the right to free movement for all peasants. He waged wars against the Lithuanians, Serbia, and the Golden Horde in the 1350s, restoring the authority of Hungarian monarchs over territories along frontiers that had been lost during previous decades. He forced the Republic of Venice to renounce the Dalmatian towns in 1358. He also made several attempts to expand his suzerainty over the rulers of Bosnia, Moldavia, Wallachia, and parts of Bulgaria and Serbia. These rulers were sometimes willing to yield to him, either under duress or in the hope of support against their internal opponents, but Louis's rule in these regions was only nominal during most of his reign. His attempts to convert his pagan or Orthodox subjects to Catholicism made him unpopular in the Balkan states. Louis established a university in Pécs in 1367, but it was closed within two decades because he did not arrange for sufficient revenues to maintain it.

Louis inherited Poland after his uncle's death in 1370. Since he had no sons, he wanted his subjects to acknowledge the right of his daughters to succeed him in both Hungary and Poland. For this purpose, he issued the Privilege of Koszyce (now Košice in Slovakia) in 1374, spelling out the liberties of Polish noblemen. However, his rule remained unpopular in Poland. In Hungary, he authorised the royal free cities to delegate jurors to the high court, hearing their cases and set up a new high court. Suffering from a skin disease, Louis became even more religious during the last years of his life. At the beginning of the Western Schism, he acknowledged Urban VI as the legitimate pope. After Urban deposed Joanna and put Louis's relative Charles of Durazzo on the throne of Naples, Louis helped Charles occupy the kingdom. In Hungarian historiography, Louis was regarded for centuries as the most powerful Hungarian monarch who ruled over an empire "whose shores were washed by three seas".

== Childhood and youth (1326–1342) ==
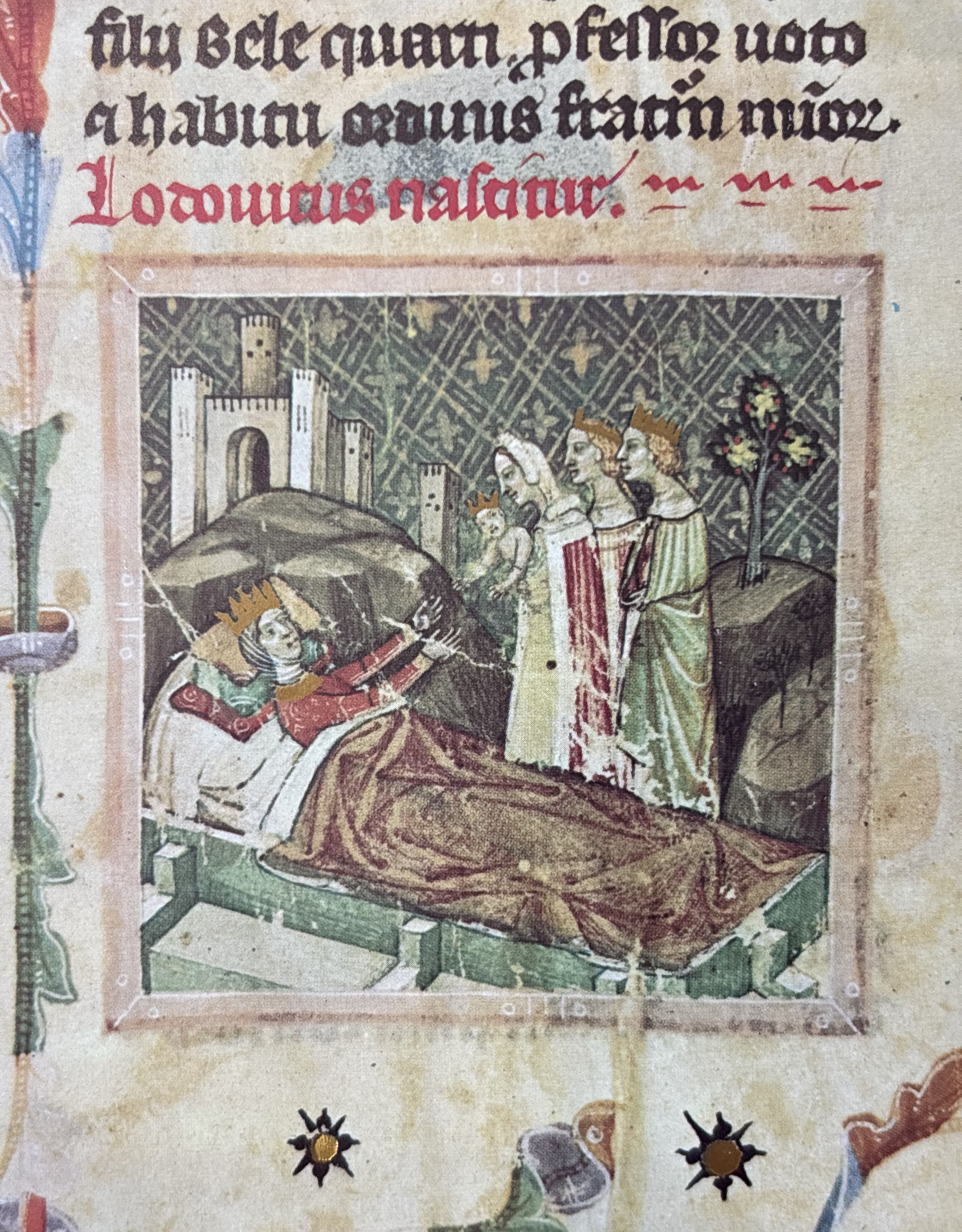
Louis I's birth depicted in the Illuminated Chronicle

Born on 5 March 1326, Louis was the third son of Charles I of Hungary and his wife, Elizabeth of Poland. He was named for his father's uncle, Louis, Bishop of Toulouse, canonised in 1317. The first-born son of his parents, Charles, died before Louis was born. Louis became his father's heir after the death of his brother Ladislaus in 1329.

He had a liberal education by the standards of his age and learned French, German and Latin. He showed a special interest in history and astrology. A cleric from Wrocław, Nicholas Neszmélyi, taught him the basic principles of Christian faith. However, Louis's religious zeal was due to his mother's influence. In a royal charter, Louis remembered that in his childhood, a knight of the royal court, Peter Poháros, often carried him on his shoulders. His two tutors, Nicholas Drugeth and Nicholas Tapolcsányi, saved the lives of both Louis and his younger brother, Andrew, when Felician Záh attempted to assassinate the royal family in Visegrád on 17 April 1330.

Louis was only nine when he stamped a treaty of alliance between his father and John of Bohemia. A year later, Louis accompanied his father in invading Austria. On 1 March 1338, John of Bohemia's son and heir, Charles, Margrave of Moravia, signed a new treaty with Charles I of Hungary and Louis in Visegrád. According to the treaty, Charles of Moravia acknowledged the right of Charles I's sons to succeed their maternal uncle, Casimir III of Poland, if Casimir died without a male issue. Louis also pledged that he would marry the margrave's three-year-old daughter, Margaret.

Casimir III's first wife, Aldona of Lithuania, died on 26 May 1339. Two leading Polish noblemen – Zbigniew, chancellor of Kraków, and Spycimir Leliwita – persuaded Casimir, who had not fathered a son, to make his sister, Elizabeth, and her offspring his heirs. According to the 15th-century Jan Długosz, Casimir held a general sejm in Kraków where "the assembled prelates and nobles" proclaimed Louis as Casimir's heir, but the reference to the sejm is anachronistic. Historian Paul W. Knoll writes that Casimir preferred his sister's family to his own daughters or a member of a cadet branch of the Piast dynasty, because he wanted to ensure the king of Hungary's support against the Teutonic Knights. Louis's father and uncle signed a treaty in Visegrád in July whereby Casimir III made Louis his heir if he died without a son. In exchange, Charles I pledged that Louis would reoccupy Pomerania and other Polish lands lost to the Teutonic Order without Polish funds and would only employ Poles in the royal administration in Poland.

Louis received the title of Duke of Transylvania from his father in 1339, but he did not administer the province. According to a royal charter from the same year, Louis's bride, Margaret of Bohemia, lived in the Hungarian royal court. Louis's separate ducal court was first mentioned in a royal charter of 1340.

== Reign ==
=== First years (1342–1345) ===
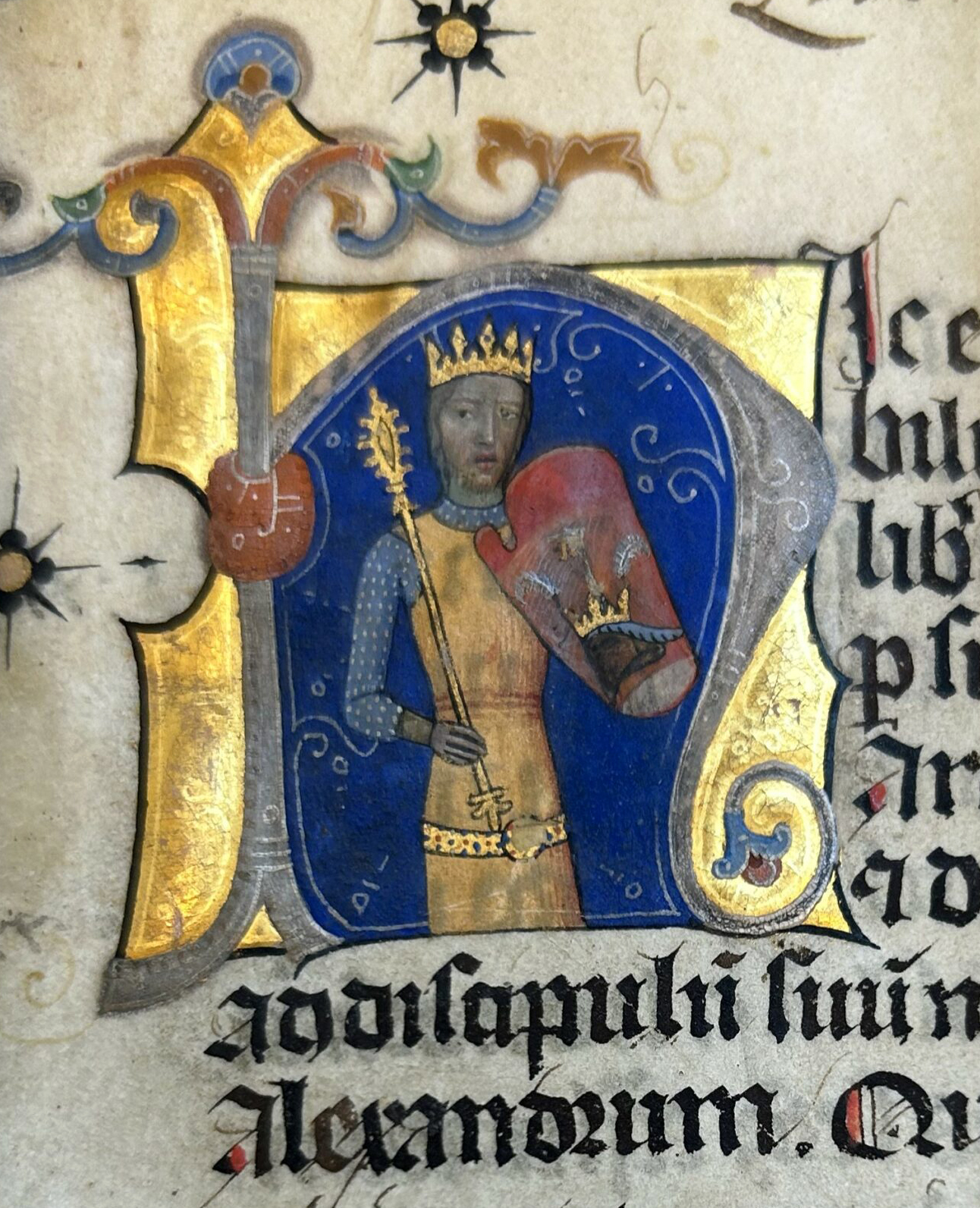
King Louis I as depicted in the Secretum Secretorum (Secret of Secrets)

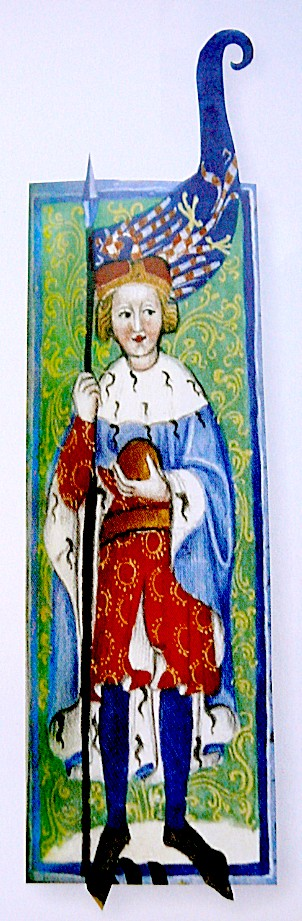
Charles, Margrave of Moravia (the future Charles IV, Holy Roman Emperor), the father of Louis I's first wife, Margaret of Bohemia (from the Gelnhausen Codex)

Charles I died on 16 July 1342. Five days later, Csanád Telegdi, Archbishop of Esztergom, crowned Louis king with the Holy Crown of Hungary in Székesfehérvár. Although Louis had attained the age of majority, his mother Elizabeth "acted as a sort of co-regent" for decades, because she exerted a powerful influence on him. Louis inherited a rich treasury from his father, who had strengthened royal authority and ruled without holding Diets during the last decades of his reign.

Louis introduced a new system of land grants, excluding the grantee's brothers and other kinsmen from the donation in contrast with customary law: such estates escheated to the Crown if the grantee's last male descendants died. On the other hand, Louis often "promoted a daughter to a son", that is authorized a daughter to inherit her father's estates, although customary law prescribed that the landed property of a deceased nobleman who had no sons was to be inherited by his kinsmen. Louis often granted this privilege to the wives of his favorites. Louis also frequently authorized landowners to apply capital punishment in their estates, limiting the authority of the magistrates of the counties.

William Drugeth, an influential advisor of Louis's late father, died in September 1342. He bequeathed his landed property to his brother, Nicholas, but Louis confiscated those estates. In late autumn, Louis dismissed his father's Voivode of Transylvania, Thomas Szécsényi, although Szécsényi's wife was a distant cousin of the queen mother. Louis especially favored the Lackfis: eight members of the family held high offices during his reign. Andrew Lackfi was the commander of the royal army during the first war of Louis's reign. In late 1342 or early 1343, he invaded Serbia and restored the Banate of Macsó, which had been lost during his father's reign.

Robert, King of Naples died on 20 January 1343. In his testament, he declared his granddaughter, Joanna I, his sole heir, excluding Louis's younger brother, Andrew, Joanna's husband, from becoming co-ruler. Louis and his mother regarded this as an infringement of a previous agreement between the late kings of Naples and Hungary. He visited his bride's father, Charles IV, Holy Roman Emperor, in Prague to persuade him to intervene on Andrew's behalf with Charles's former tutor, Pope Clement VI, the overlord of the Kingdom of Naples. Louis also sent envoys to his Neapolitan relatives and the high officials of the kingdom, urging them to promote his brother's interests. Their mother, Elizabeth, left for Naples in the summer, taking with her almost the whole royal treasure, including more than 6,628 kilograms (14,612 lb) of silver and 5,150 kilograms (11,350 lb) of gold. During her seven-month-long stay in Italy, she was only able to persuade her daughter-in-law and the pope to promise that Andrew would be crowned as Joanna's husband.

According to the nearly contemporaneous chronicle of John of Küküllő, Louis launched his first campaign against a group of Transylvanian Saxons, who had refused to pay taxes, and forced them to yield in the summer of 1344. During his stay in Transylvania, Nicholas Alexander of Wallachia – who was the son of Basarab I of Wallachia, the ruling prince of Wallachia – swore loyalty to Louis on his father's behalf in Brassó (now Brașov in Romania); thus the suzerainty of the Hungarian monarchs over Wallachia was, at least outwardly, restored.

Louis joined a crusade against the pagan Lithuanians in December 1344. The crusaders – including John of Bohemia, Charles of Moravia, Peter I, Duke of Bourbon, and William II, Count of Hainaut – laid siege to Vilnius. However, a Lithuanian invasion of the lands of the Teutonic Knights forced them to lift the siege. Louis returned to Hungary in late February 1345. He dispatched Andrew Lackfi, Count of the Székelys, to invade the lands of the Golden Horde in retaliation for the Tatars' earlier plundering raids against Transylvania and the Szepesség (now Spiš in Slovakia). Andrew Lackfi and his army of mainly Székelys warriors inflicted a defeat on a large Tatar army on 2 February 1345. Hungarian warriors were victorious in their campaign, decapitating the local Tatar leader, the brother-in-law of the Khan, Atlamïş, and making the Tatars flee toward the coastal area. The Golden Horde was pushed back behind the Dniester River. Thereafter, the Golden Horde's control of the lands between the Eastern Carpathians and the Black Sea weakened. A conflict between Louis's uncle and father-in-law (Casimir III of Poland and Charles of Moravia) led to a war between Poland and Bohemia in April. In this war, Louis supported his uncle with reinforcements in accordance with the agreement of 1339.

While Louis's armies were fighting in Poland and against the Tatars, Louis marched to Croatia in June 1345 and besieged Knin, the former seat of the late Ivan Nelipić, who had successfully resisted Louis's father, forcing Vladislava Kurjaković, his widow and son to surrender. The Kurjaković family and other Croatian noblemen also yielded to him during his stay in Croatia. The citizens of Zadar rebelled against the Republic of Venice and accepted his suzerainty. Louis meanwhile returned to Visegrád. He dispatched Stephen II, Ban of Bosnia, to assist the burghers of Zadar, but the ban did not fight against the Venetians.

=== Gallery ===
Louis's first royal seal, lost during a campaign in Bosnia in 1363

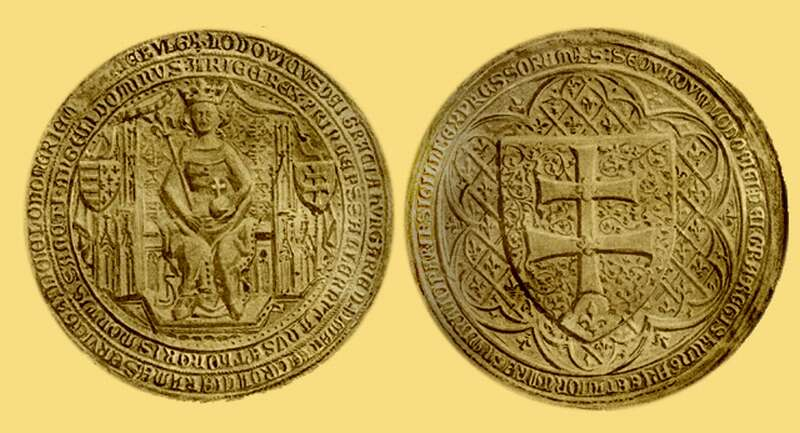
Louis's second royal seal, introduced in 1363

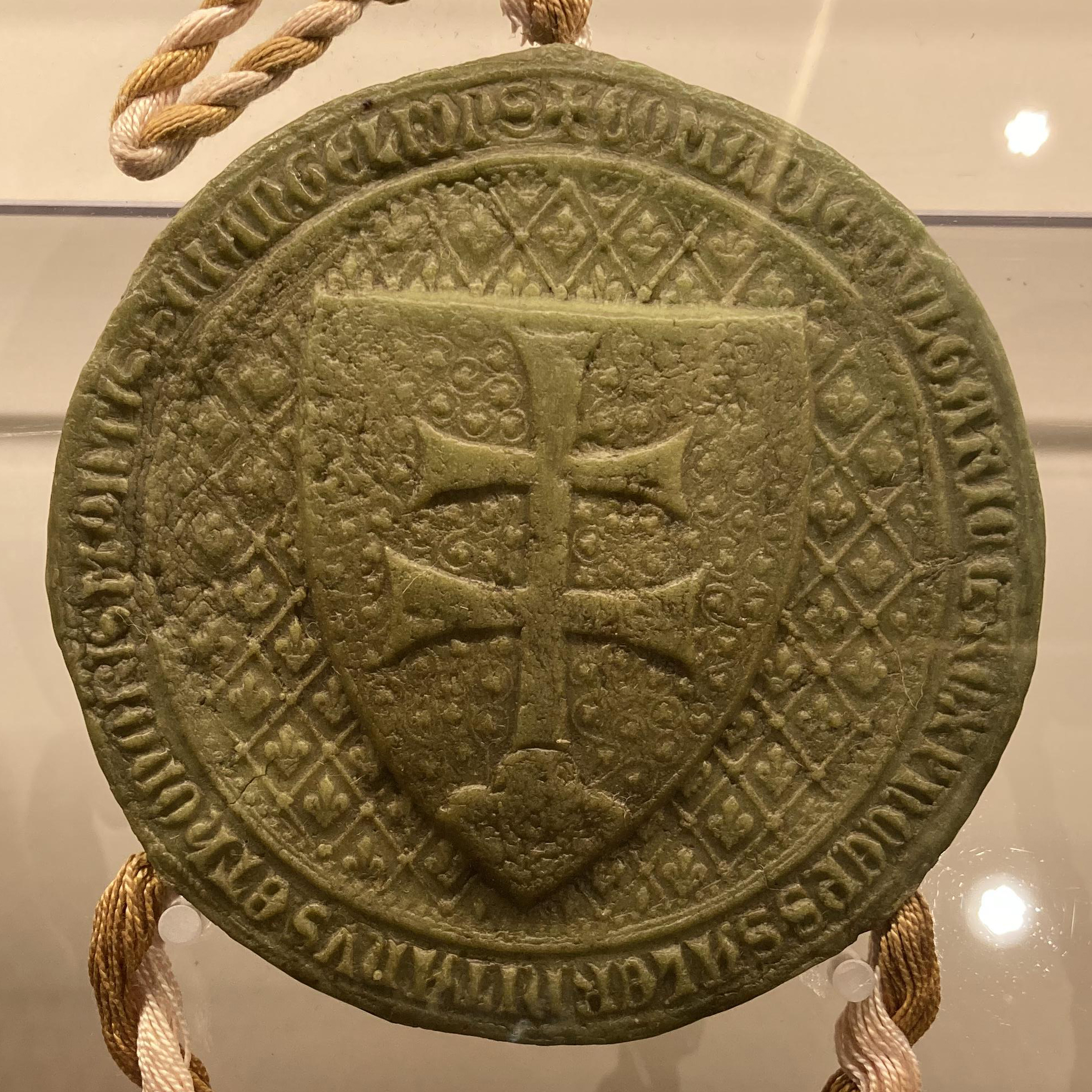
Reverse of the second double seal (1366–1382) of King Louis I the Great (1342–1382)

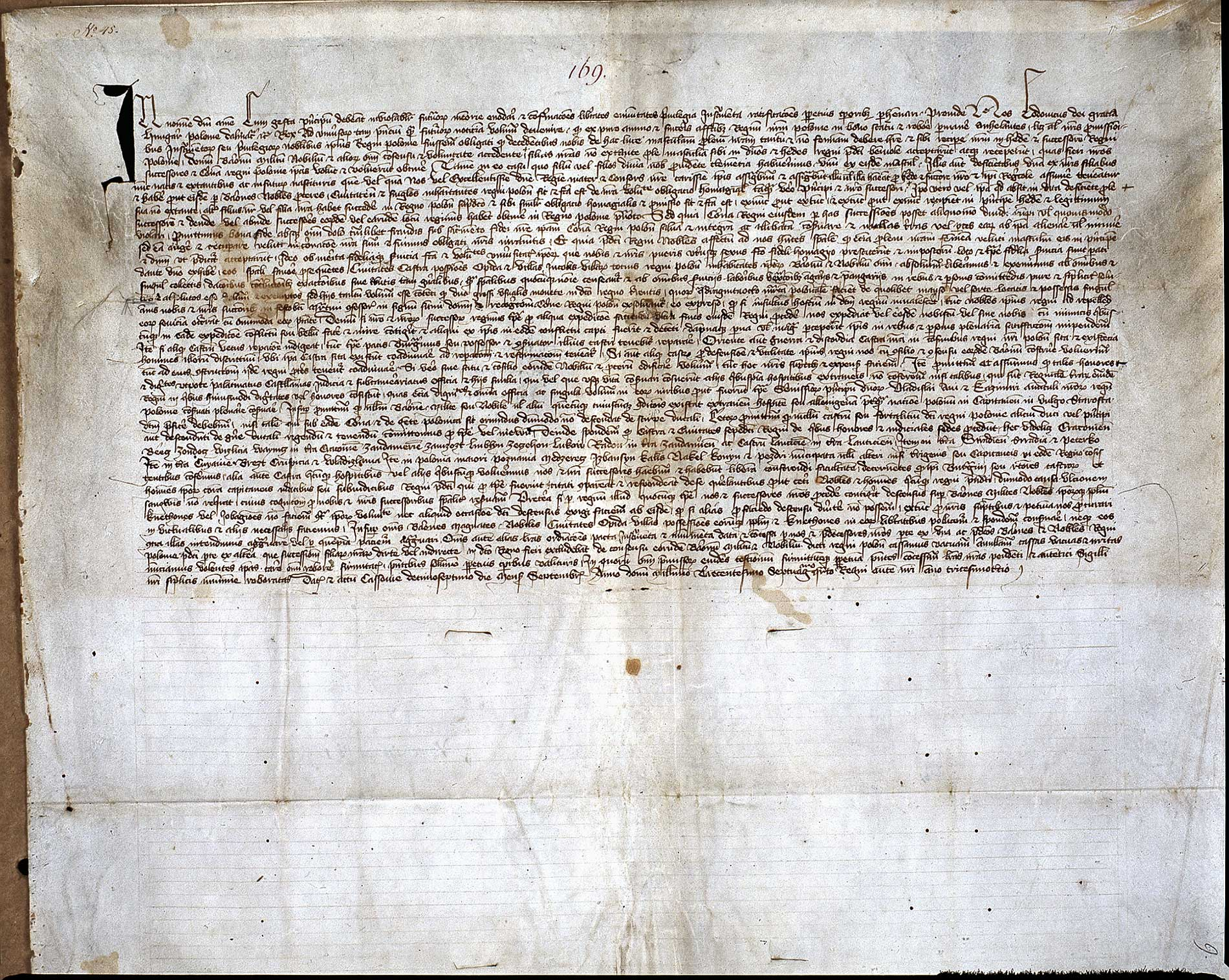
Privilege of Kassa (Košice)

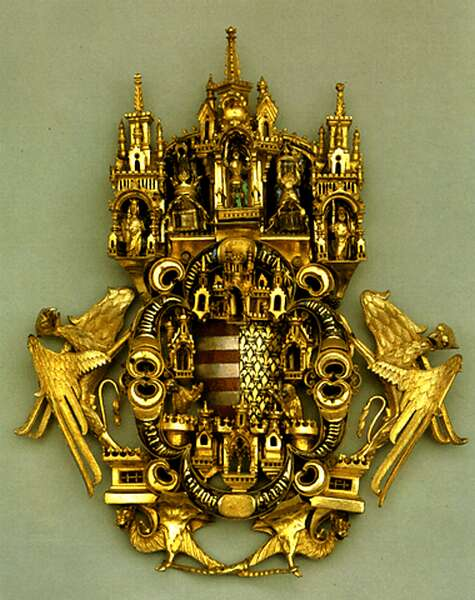
The Golden Cloak clasp, Hungarian Chapel in the Cathedral of Aachen

=== Neapolitan campaigns (1345–1350) ===
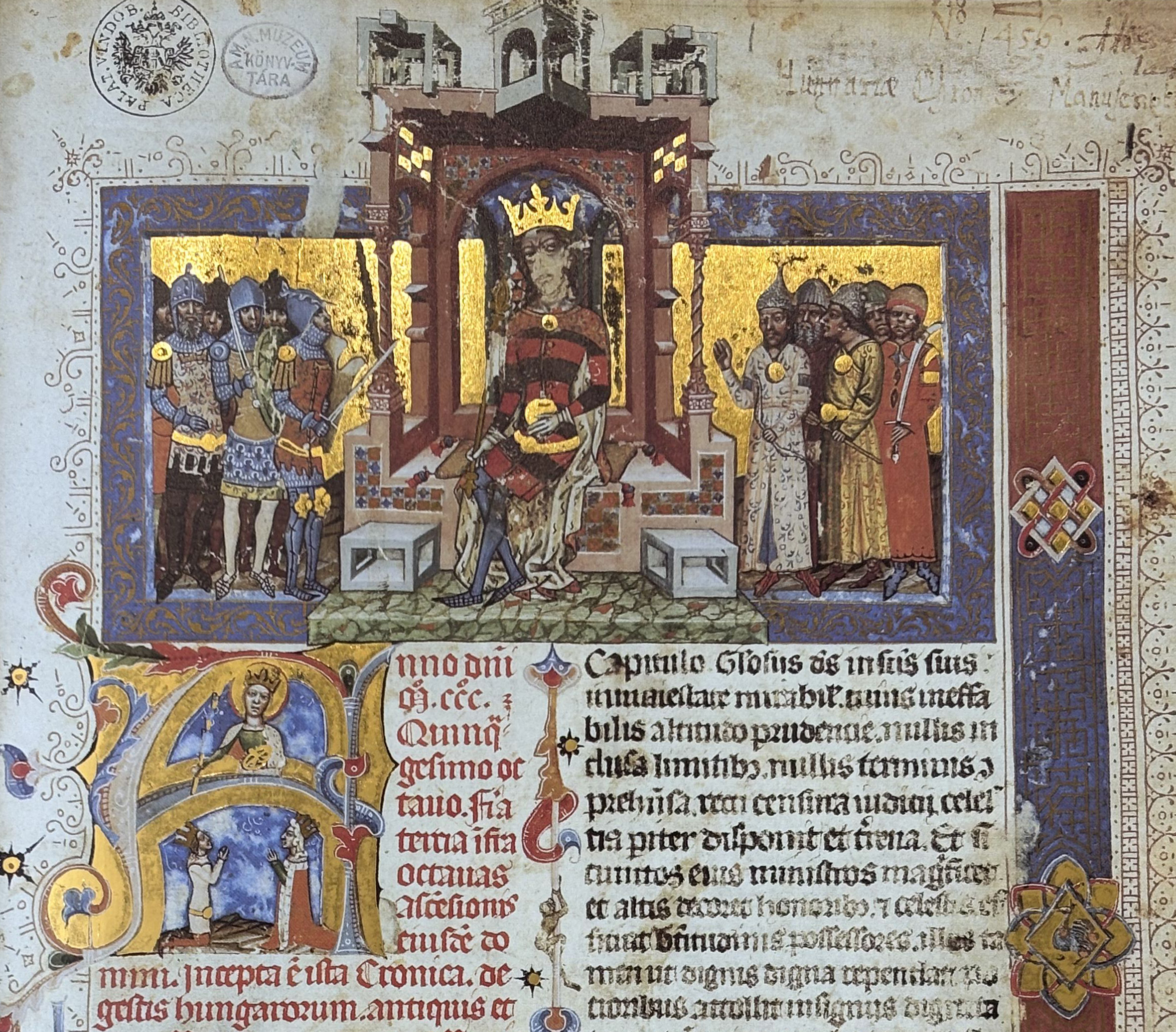
King Louis on the throne around his knights (Chronicon Pictum, 1358)

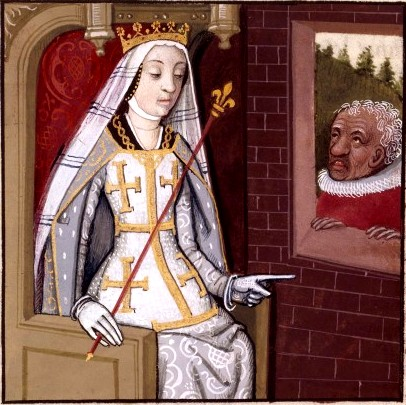
Louis's sister-in-law, Joanna I of Naples, whom he regarded as a "husband-killer" after the assassination of his brother, Andrew, Duke of Calabria (from a manuscript of Giovanni Boccaccio's De mulieribus claris)

Reconstruction of the Castle of Diósgyőr, which was one of his favourite hunting castles

Louis's brother Andrew was murdered in Aversa on 18 September 1345. Louis and his mother accused Queen Joanna I, Prince Robert of Taranto, Duke Charles of Durazzo and other members of the Neapolitan branches of the Capetian House of Anjou of plotting against Andrew. In his letter of 15 January 1346 to Pope Clement VI, Louis demanded that the pope dethrone the "husband-killer" queen in favor of Charles Martel, her infant son by Andrew. Louis also laid claim to the regency of the kingdom during the minority of his nephew, referring to his patrilinear descent from the first-born son of King Robert of Naples's father, Charles II of Naples. He even promised to increase the amount of yearly tribute that the kings of Naples would pay to the Holy See. After the pope failed to fully investigate Andrew's murder, Louis decided to invade southern Italy. In preparation for the invasion, he sent his envoys to Ancona and other Italian towns before summer 1346.

While his envoys negotiated in Italy, Louis marched to Dalmatia to relieve Zadar, but the Venetians bribed his commanders. When the citizens broke out and attacked the besiegers on 1 July 1346, the royal army failed to intervene, and the Venetians overcame the defenders outside the walls of the town. Louis withdrew but refused to renounce Dalmatia, although the Venetians offered to pay 320,000 golden florins as compensation. Lacking military support from Louis, however, Zadar surrendered to the Venetians on 21 December 1346.

Louis sent small expeditions one after another to Italy at the beginning of his war against Joanna I, because he did not want to harass the Italians who had suffered from a famine the previous year. His first troops departed under the command of Nicholas II Vásári, Bishop of Nyitra (now Nitra in Slovakia), on 24 April 1347. Louis also hired German mercenaries. He departed from Visegrád on 11 November 1346 After marching through Udine, Verona, Modena, Bologna, Urbino, and Perugia, he entered the Kingdom of Naples on 24 December 1346 near L'Aquila, which had yielded to him.

Queen Joanna I remarried, wedding a cousin, Louis of Taranto, and fled to Marseille on 11 January 1348. Their other relatives, Robert of Taranto and Charles of Durazzo, visited Louis in Aversa to yield to him. Louis received them amicably and convinced them to persuade their brothers, Philip II of Taranto and Louis of Durazzo, to join them. After their arrival, King Louis's "smile was replaced by the harshest expression as he unveiled with terrible words the true feelings he had for the princes and that he had kept hidden until then", according to the contemporaneous Domenico da Gravina. He repeated his former accusations, blamed his kinsmen for his brother's murder, and had them captured on 22 January. The next day Charles of Durazzo – the husband of Joanna I's sister, Mary – was beheaded upon Louis's orders. The other princes were kept captive and sent to Hungary, together with Louis's infant nephew, Charles Martel.

Louis marched to Naples in February. The citizens offered him a ceremonious entry, but he refused, threatening to let his soldiers sack the town if they did not raise the taxes. He adopted the traditional titles of the kings of Naples – "King of Sicily and Jerusalem, Duke of Apulia and Prince of Capua" – and administered the kingdom from the Castel Nuovo, garrisoning his mercenaries in the most important forts. He used unusually brutal methods of investigation to capture all accomplices in the death of his brother, according to Domenico da Gravina. Most local noble families (including the Balzos and the Sanseverinos) refused to cooperate with him. The pope refused to confirm Louis's rule in Naples, which would have united two powerful kingdoms under Louis's rule. The pope and the cardinals declared Queen Joanna innocent of her husband's murder at a formal meeting of the College of Cardinals.

The arrival of the Black Death forced Louis to leave Italy in May. He made Ulrich Wolfhardt governor of Naples, but his mercenaries did not hinder Joanna I and her husband from returning in September. Louis, who had signed a truce for eight years with Venice on 5 August 1348, sent new troops to Naples under the command of Stephen I Lackfi, Voivode of Transylvania, in late 1349. Lackfi reoccupied Capua, Aversa and other forts that had been lost to Joanna I, but a mutiny among his German mercenaries forced him to return to Hungary. The Black Death had meanwhile reached Hungary. The first wave of the epidemic ended in June, but it returned in September, killing Louis's first wife, Margaret. Louis also fell ill, but survived the plague. Although the Black Death was less devastating in the sparsely populated Hungary than in other parts of Europe, there were regions that became depopulated in 1349, and the demand for work force increased in the subsequent years.

Louis proposed to renounce the Kingdom of Naples if Clement dethroned Joanna. After the pope refused, Louis departed for his second Neapolitan campaign in April 1350. He suppressed a mutiny that occurred among his mercenaries while he and his troops were waiting for the arrival of further troops in Barletta. While marching towards Naples, he faced resistance at many towns because his vanguards, which were under the command of Stephen Lackfi, had become notorious for their cruelty.

During the campaign, Louis personally led assaults and climbed city walls together with his soldiers, endangering his own life. While besieging Canosa di Puglia, Louis fell into the moat from a ladder when a defender of the fort hit him with a stone. He dove into a river without hesitation to save a young soldier who was swept away while exploring a ford upon his order. An arrow pierced Louis's left leg during the siege of Aversa. After the fall of Aversa to Hungarian troops on 3 August 1350, Queen Joanna and her husband again fled from Naples. However, Louis decided to return to Hungary. According to the contemporaneous historian Matteo Villani, Louis attempted to "leave the kingdom without losing face" after he had run out of money and experienced the resistance of the local population.

To celebrate the Jubilee of 1350, Louis visited Rome during his journey back to Hungary. He arrived in Buda on 25 October 1350. With the mediation of the Holy See, the envoys of Louis and Queen Joanna's husband, Louis I of Naples, signed a truce for six months. The pope promised Louis that the queen's role in her husband's murder would again be investigated, and he ordered her to pay 300,000 gold florins as a ransom for the imprisoned Neapolitan princes.

=== Expansion (1350–1358) ===
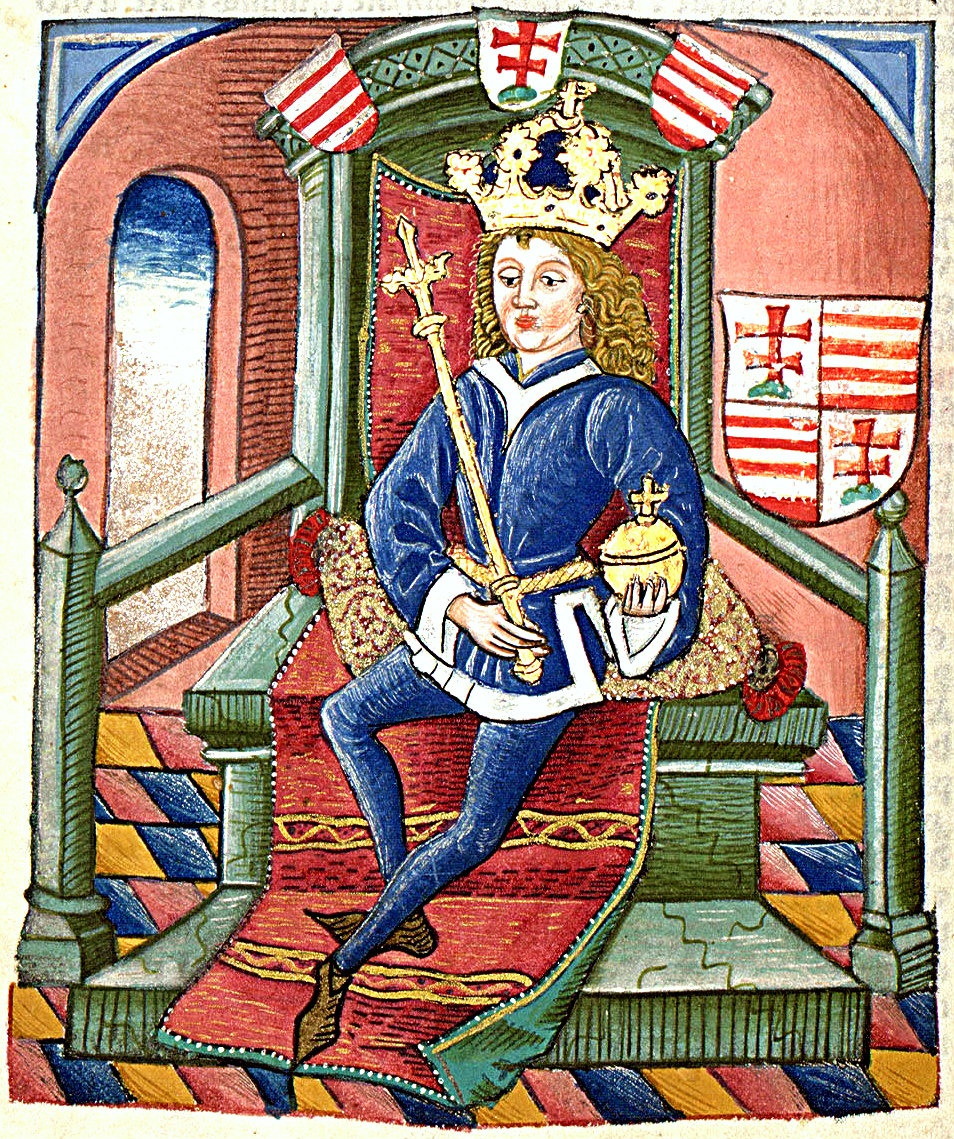
Louis I as depicted in the Chronica Hungarorum

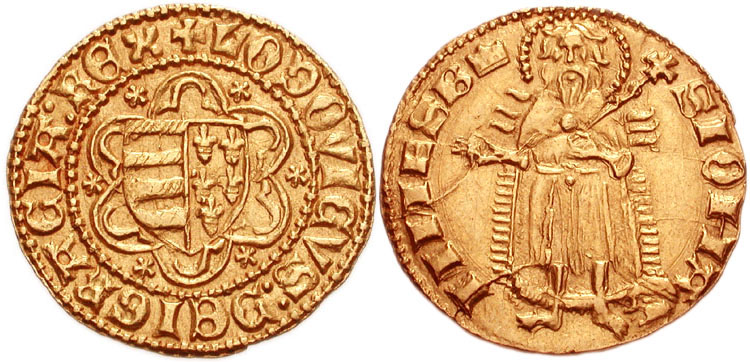
Louis I's golden florin, minted in the 1350s, depicting King Saint Ladislaus

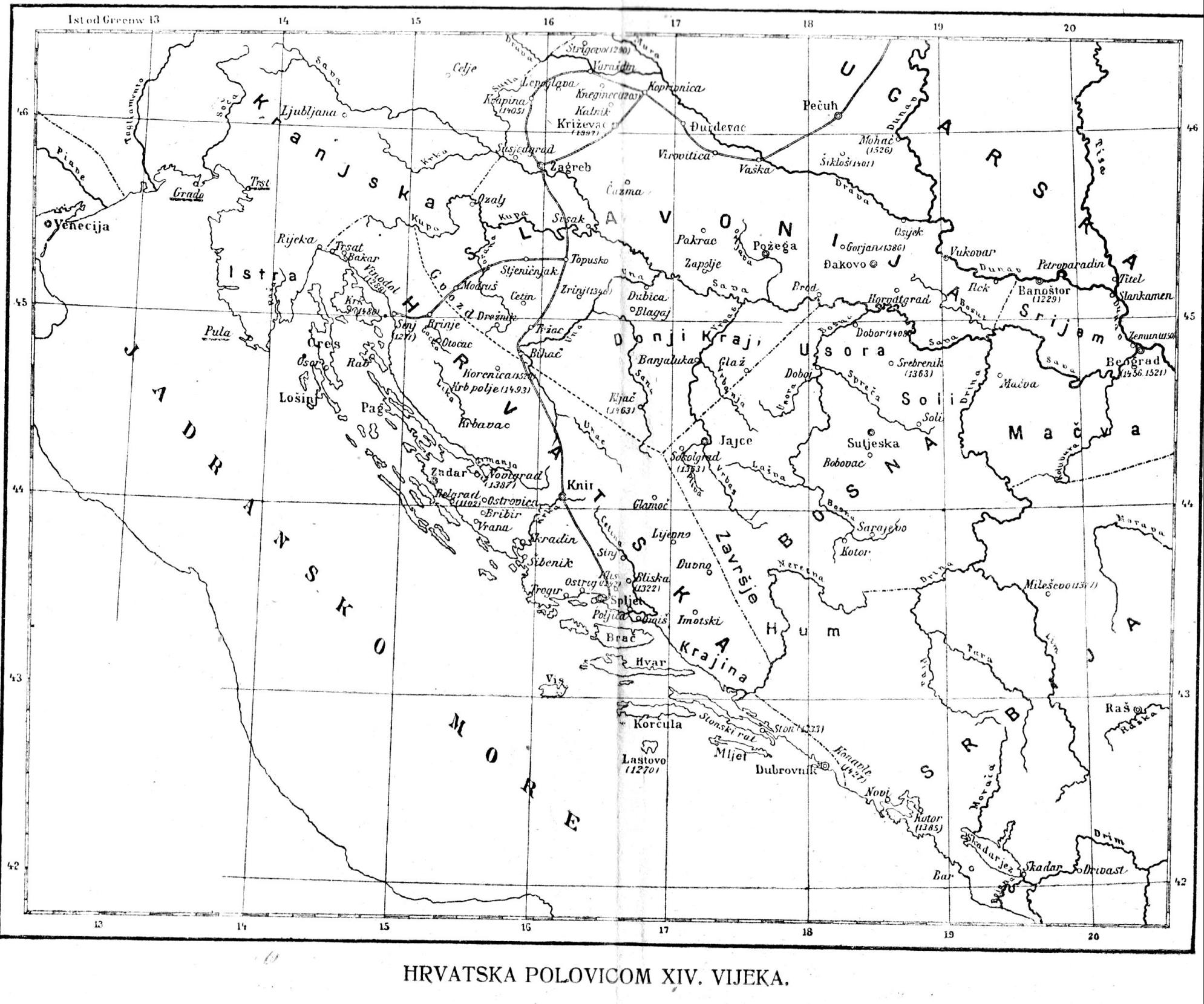
Croatian lands ruled by Louis in the middle of the 14th century

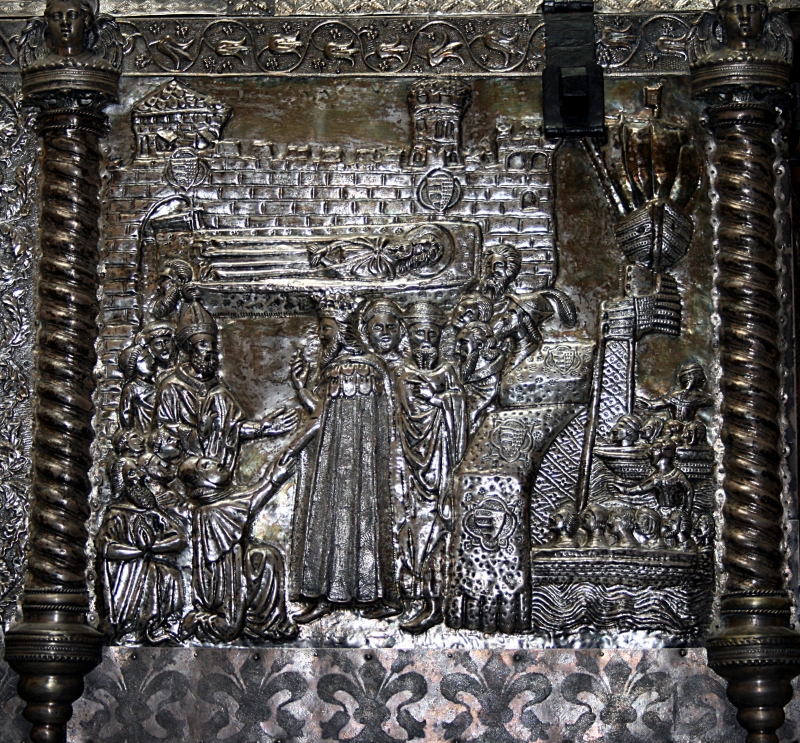
The citizens of Zadar receive Louis (embossment on a contemporaneous reliquary)

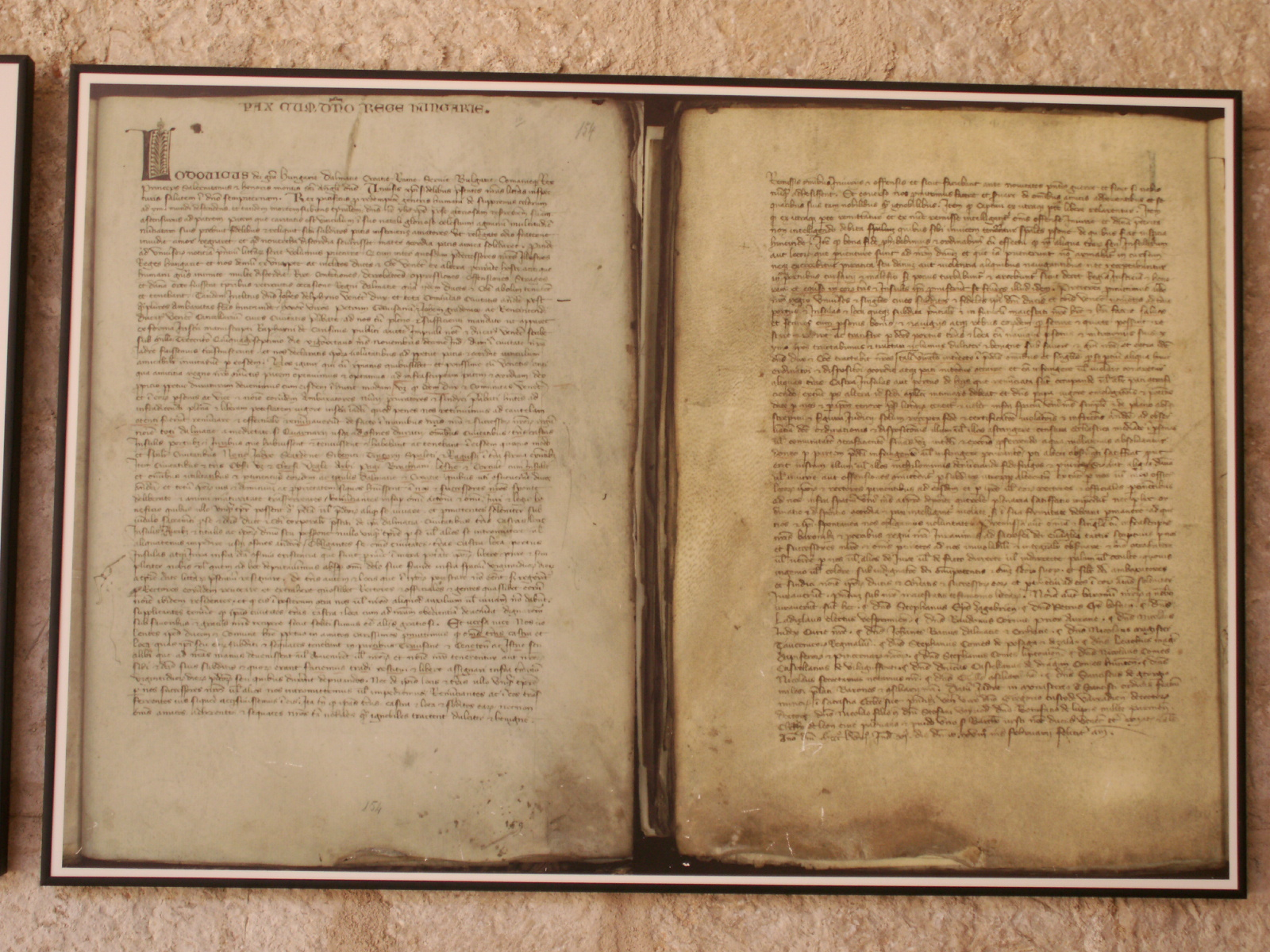
Peace-treaty of Zadar

Casimir III of Poland urged Louis to intervene in his war with the Lithuanians who had occupied Brest, Volodymyr-Volynskyi, and other important towns in Kingdom of Galicia–Volhynia in the previous years. The two monarchs agreed that Halych and Lodomeria would be integrated into the Kingdom of Hungary after Casimir's death. Casimir also authorised Louis to redeem the two realms for 100,000 florins if Casimir fathered a son. Louis led his army to Kraków in June 1351. Because Casimir fell ill, Louis became the sole commander of the united Polish and Hungarian army. He invaded the lands of the Lithuanian prince, Kęstutis, in July. Kęstutis seemingly accepted Louis's suzerainty on 15 August 1351 and agreed to be baptised, along with his brothers, in Buda. However, Kęstutis did nothing to fulfill his promises after Polish and Hungarian troops were withdrawn. In an attempt to capture Kęstutis, Louis returned, but he could not defeat the Lithuanians, who even killed one of his allies, Bolesław III of Płock, in battle. Louis returned to Buda before 13 September 1351. A papal legate visited Louis to persuade him to wage war against Stefan Dušan, Emperor of the Serbs, who had forced his Catholic Church subjects to be re-baptised and join the Serbian Orthodox Church.

To deal with the grievances of the Hungarian noblemen, Louis held a Diet in late 1351. He confirmed all but one of the provisions of the Golden Bull of 1222, declaring that all noblemen enjoyed the same liberties in his realms. He rejected only the provision that authorized noblemen who died without a son to freely bequeath their estates. Instead, he introduced an entail system, prescribing that the estates of a nobleman who had no male descendants passed to his kinsmen, or if there were no male relatives to the Crown, upon his death. At the same Diet, Louis ordered that all landowners were to collect the "ninth", that is, one tenth of specified agricultural products, from the peasants who held plots on their estates. On the other hand, he confirmed the right of all peasants to freely move to another landowner's estates.

The "general accord" between Louis and the royal couple of Naples "was accepted by both sides" during 1351, according to the contemporaneous Niccolò Acciaioli. Joanna I and her husband returned to the Kingdom of Naples and Louis's troops were withdrawn. Louis even renounced the ransom that Joanna I had promised to pay for the liberation of the imprisoned Neapolitan princes, stating that he had not gone to "war for greed, but to avenge the death of his brother". Louis continued to use the titles of his grandfather, Charles Martel of Anjou (the firstborn son of Charles II of Naples), styling himself as "Prince of Salerno and lord of Monte Sant'Angelo".

Casimir III laid siege to Belz and Louis joined his uncle in March 1352. During the siege, which ended without the surrender of the fort, Louis was heavily injured in the head. Algirdas, Grand Duke of Lithuania, hired Tatar mercenaries who stormed into Podolia. Louis returned to Hungary because he feared a Tatar invasion of Transylvania. Pope Clement VI proclaimed a crusade against the Lithuanians and the Tatars in May, authorising Louis to collect a tithe from Church revenues during the next four years. The pope stated that he had never "granted a tenth of such duration", emphasising the link between his magnanimity and the release of the imprisoned Neapolitan princes. The pope also authorised Louis to seize the pagans' and schismatics' lands bordering on his kingdom.

Although Louis signed an alliance with the Republic of Genoa in October 1352, he did not intervene in the Genoese–Venetian War because his truce of 1349 with Venice was still in force. Louis married Elizabeth of Bosnia, who was the daughter of his vassal, Stephen II, in 1353. Historian Gyula Kristó says that this marriage showed Louis's renewed interest in the affairs of the Balkan Peninsula. While he was hunting in Zólyom County (now in Slovakia) in late November 1353, a brown bear attacked him, inflicting 24 wounds on his legs. Louis's life was saved by a knight of the court, John Besenyő, who killed the beast with his sword.

According to Matteo Villani, Louis launched an expedition against the Golden Horde at the head of an army of 200,000 horsemen in April 1354. The young Tatar ruler, whom historian Iván Bertényi identified as Jani Beg, did not want to wage war against Hungary and agreed to sign a peace treaty. Although no other primary source mentioned that campaign and treaty, the Tatars made no plundering raids in Transylvania after 1354, which suggests that Villani's report is reliable. In the same year, Louis invaded Serbia, Stefan Dušan successfully repelled the invasion, preserving, or even extending his original borders in the north. Under pressure, Dušan initiated negotiations with the Holy See for acknowledgement of the popes' primacy. Peace with Dušan was concluded in May 1355. The following year, Louis sent reinforcements to Casimir III to fight against the Lithuanians, and Hungarian troops supported Albert II, Duke of Austria, against Zürich. The Venetian delegates offered at Louis, 6000–7000 golden ducats as a compensation for Dalmatia, but Louis refused to give up his plan to reconquer the province. He signed an alliance with Albert II of Austria and Nicolaus of Luxemburg, Patriarch of Aquileia, against Venice. Upon his order, Croatian lords besieged and captured Klis, a Dalmatian fortress that Stefan Dušan's sister, Jelena Nemanjić Šubić, had inherited from her husband, Mladen III Šubić.

In the summer of 1356, Louis invaded Venetian territories without a formal declaration of war. He laid siege to Treviso on 27 July 1356. A local nobleman, Giuliano Baldachino, noticed that Louis sat alone while writing his letters on the banks of Sile River on each morning. Baldachino proposed the Venetians to assassinate him in exchange for 12,000 golden florins and Castelfranco Veneto, but they refused his offer because he did not share the details of his plans with them. Louis returned to Buda in the autumn, but his troops continued the siege. Pope Innocent VI urged the Venetians to make peace with Hungary. The pope made Louis the "standard-bearer of the Church" and granted him a three-year tithe to fight against Francesco II Ordelaffi and other rebellious lords in the Papal States. Louis sent an army under Nicholas Lackfi's command to support the pope's troops in Italy.

Louis marched to Dalmatia in July 1357. Split, Trogir, and Šibenik soon got rid of Venetian governors and yielded to Louis. After a short siege, Louis's army also captured Zadar with the assistance of its townspeople. Tvrtko I of Bosnia, who had succeeded Louis's father-in-law in 1353, surrendered western Hum to Louis, who claimed that territory as his wife's dowry. In the Treaty of Zadar, which was signed on 18 February 1358, the Republic of Venice renounced all Dalmatian towns and islands between the Gulf of Kvarner and Durazzo in favor of Louis. The Republic of Ragusa also accepted Louis's suzerainty. The Dalmatian towns remained self-governing communities, owing only a yearly tribute and naval service to Louis, who also abolished all commercial restrictions that had been introduced during the Venetians' rule. The merchants of Ragusa were explicitly entitled to freely trade in Serbia even during a war between Hungary and Serbia.

=== Wars in the Balkans (1358–1370) ===
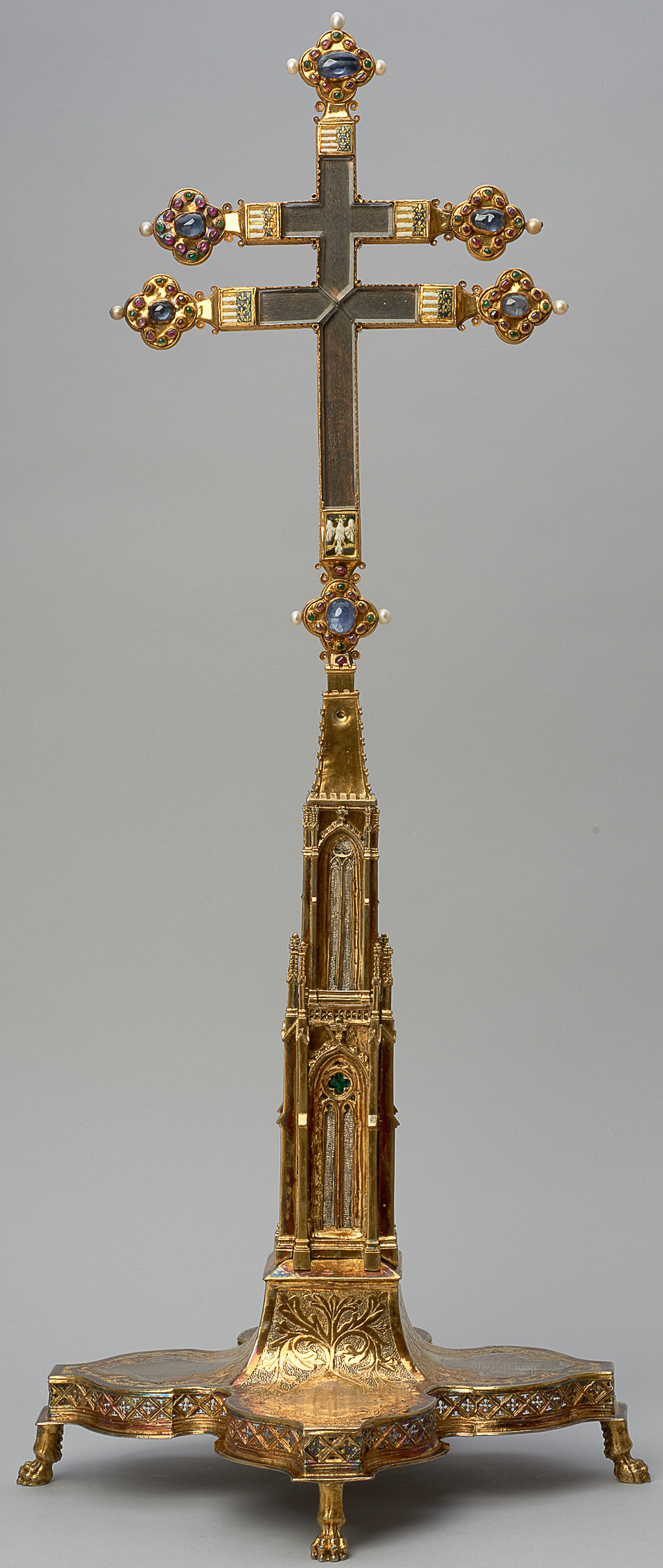
Relic cross of Louis in the Imperial Treasury, Vienna

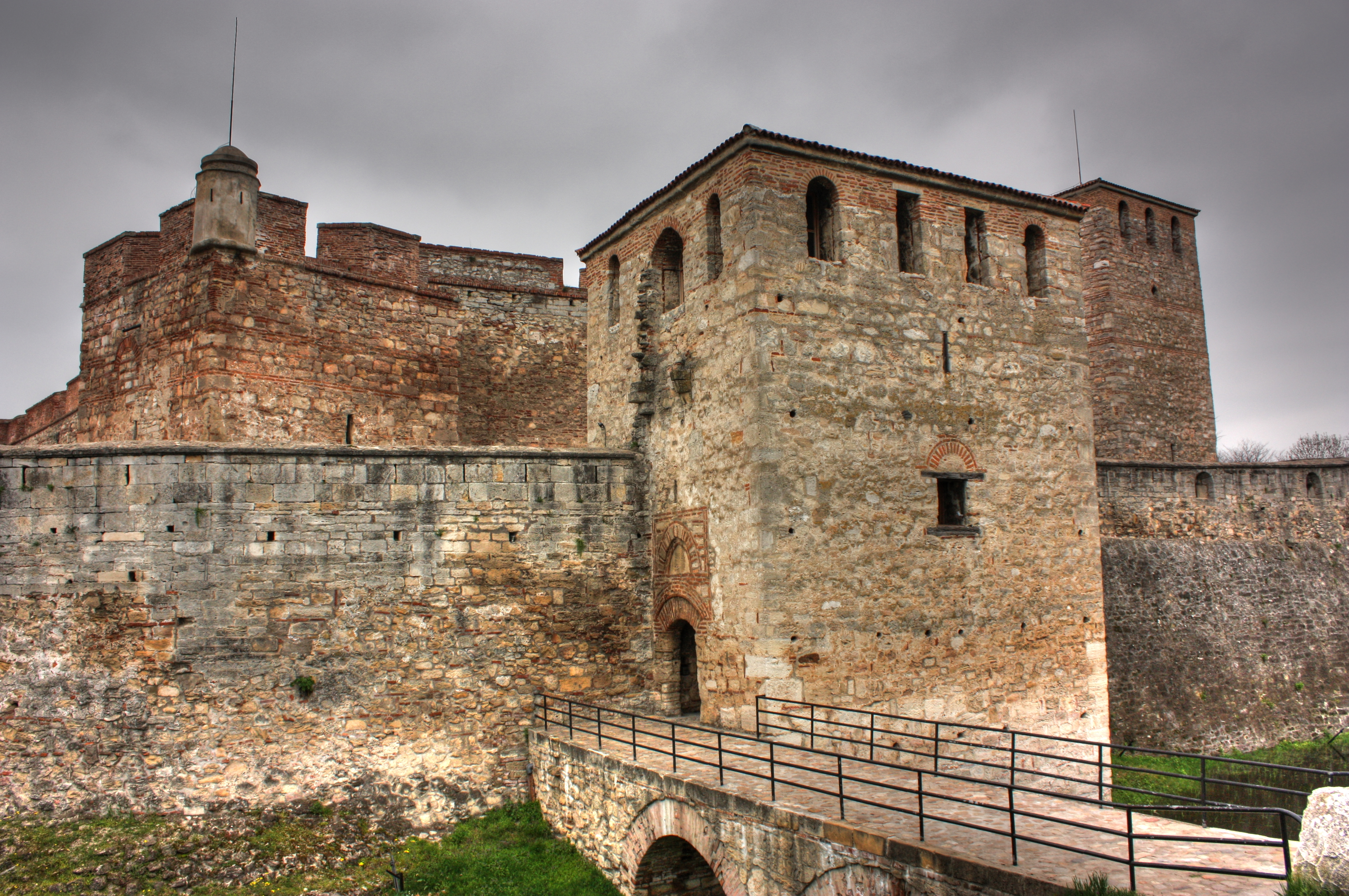
The medieval fortress of Vidin in Bulgaria, the seat of Louis's governors between 1365 and 1369

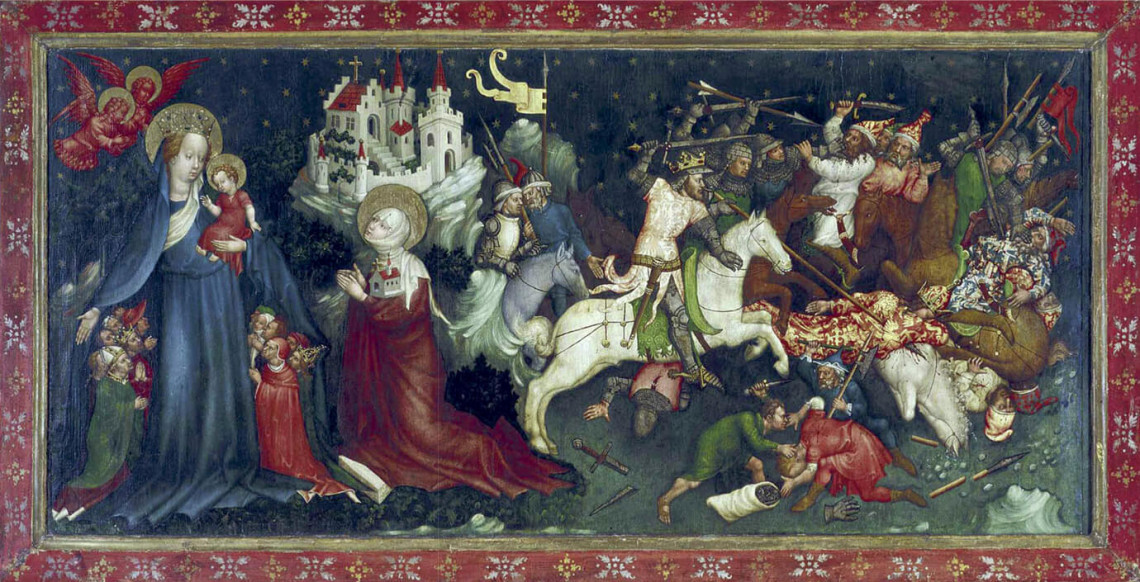
The picture immortalizing the battles of King Louis the Great against the Ottomans and the vow made to found the Mariazell Abbey in celebration of their success (St. Lambert's Abbey, 1420)

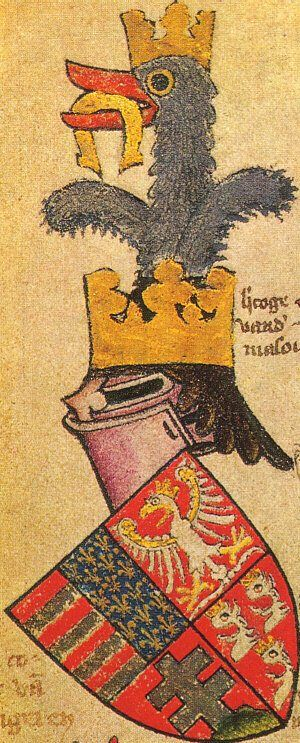
Louis's coat of arms showing, clockwise from upper left: the ancient arms of Hungary dimidiated with France; the Polish eagle; the Dalmatian lions' heads; the modern arms of Hungary.

Serbia started to disintegrate after the death of Stefan Dušan. According to Matteo Villani, an unidentified Serbian lord sought Hungarian assistance against his more powerful (and also unnamed) enemy in the late 1350s. Historians John Van Antwerp Fine, Jr. and Pál Engel write that the Serbian lord was a member of the Rastislalić family; Gyula Kristó and Iván Bertényi identify him as Lazar Hrebeljanović. Royal charters of 1358 show that Hungarian troops fought in Serbia in October 1358. The next summer Louis also marched to Serbia, but Stefan Uroš V of Serbia avoided battle.

Louis and the royal army stayed in Transylvania in November 1359 and January 1360, implying that he planned a military expedition against Wallachia or another neighboring territory. A charter of 1360 said that a Romanian voivode, Dragoș of Giulești, restored Louis's suzerainty in Moldavia after a rebellion of local Romanians. According to most Moldavian chronicles, Dragoș, who is sometimes identified with Dragoș of Giulești and sometimes as Dragoș of Bedeu, departed "from the Hungarian country, from Maramureș" at the head of his retinue, crossed the Carpathian Mountains while chasing an aurochs and settled in the valley of the Moldova River in 1359. The same chronicles presented this "dismounting" by Dragoș as a decisive step towards the development of the Principality of Moldavia. Another Romanian voivode, Bogdan, who had rebelled against Louis and plundered the estates of the Romanian landowners loyal to the king already in the 1340s, departed from Hungary and invaded Moldavia in the early 1360s. Bogdan expelled the descendants of Louis's vassal, Dragoș, from the principality. According to John of Küküllő, Louis launched several expeditions against Bogdan, but their dates cannot be determined. Bogdan ruled Moldavia as an independent prince.

Upon the pope's request, Louis sent Hungarian troops to relieve Bologna, which was besieged by Bernabò Visconti's troops. After Visconti lifted the siege, Louis's mercenaries pillaged the region and refused to cooperate with the papal legate; Louis had the commander of the army imprisoned. After a conflict emerged between Emperor Charles IV and Rudolf IV, Duke of Austria, rumors spread about a conspiracy to dethrone the emperor in favor of Louis or Rudolf. Charles IV, Rudolf IV and Louis met in Nagyszombat (now Trnava in Slovakia) in May. The emperor and the duke mutually surrendered their claims to the other party's realms. Louis also persuaded the emperor to renounce his suzerainty over the Duchy of Płock in Poland.

Louis decided to convert the Jews in Hungary to Catholicism around 1360. After experiencing resistance, he expelled them from his realms. Their immovable property was confiscated, but they were allowed to take their personal property with them and also to recover the loans they had made. No pogrom took place, which was unusual in Europe in the 14th century, according to historian Raphael Patai.

Emperor Charles IV, Holy Roman Emperor and Rudolf IV, Duke of Austria signed a treaty of alliance against the patriarch of Aquileia, who was Louis's ally, in August 1361. Fearing the formation of a coalition along the western borders of Hungary, Louis asked his former enemy, Louis I of Naples (Joanna I of Naples's husband), to send at least one of his brothers to Buda, and mediated a reconciliation between Rudolph IV and the patriarch. At a meeting with Louis's envoys in Prague, Emperor Charles made an insulting remark about Louis's mother, stating that she "was shameless", according to Jan Długosz's chronicle. Louis demanded an apology, but the emperor did not answer.

In preparation for a war against Bohemia, Louis ordered the mobilisation of the royal army and marched to Trencsén (now Trenčín in Slovakia). However, his supposed allies (Rudolf IV of Austria, Meinhard, Duke of Upper Bavaria and Casimir III the Great) failed to join him, and the emperor initiated negotiations that lasted for months with the mediation of Casimir III. Louis was finally reconciled with Charles IV at their meeting in Uherské Hradiště on 8 May 1363.

Louis invaded Bosnia from two directions in the spring of 1363. An army under the command of Palatine Nicholas Kont and Nicholas Apáti, Archbishop of Esztergom, laid siege to Srebrenica, but the fortress did not surrender. As the royal seal was stolen during the siege, a new seal was made and all Louis's former charters were to be confirmed with the new seal. The army under Louis's personal command besieged Sokolac in July, but could not capture it. Hungarian troops returned to Hungary in the same month. Pope Urban V proclaimed a crusade against the Muslim powers of the Mediterranean upon Peter I of Cyprus's request on 31 March 1363. Urban V urged Louis to join the crusade, emphasising that he was a powerful monarch, a devout Christian, and "well-placed to help". The next month, the pope levied a three-year tithe on the church revenues in Hungary and asked Louis to support the papal officials to collect the tax. However, Louis made every effort to hinder the activities of the papal tax collectors, stating that he needed resources to cover the costs of his future wars against the infidels and the pope's enemies in Italy.

Louis signed a treaty with Emperor Charles and Rudolf IV of Austria in Brno in early 1364, which put an end to their conflicts. In September, Louis visited Kraków to attend the large congress where Peter I of Cyprus attempted to persuade a dozen European monarchs to join the crusade. Louis was the only monarch to promise assistance, but later failed to fulfill his promise. At the congress, Casimir III of Poland confirmed Louis's right to succeed him in Poland if he died without a male issue. Louis, who had not fathered a son either, invited a distant relative of his, Charles III of Naples, to Hungary in 1364, but did not make the young prince his official heir. Louis allowed the Jews to return to Hungary in the same year; legal proceedings between the Jews and those who had seized their houses lasted for years.

Louis assembled his armies in Temesvár (now Timișoara in Romania) in February 1365. According to a royal charter that year, he was planning to invade Wallachia because the new voivode, Vladislav I of Wallachia, had refused to obey him. However, he ended up heading a campaign against the Bulgarian Tsardom of Vidin and its ruler Ivan Sratsimir, which suggests that Vladislav I of Wallachia had in the meantime yielded to him. Louis seized Vidin and imprisoned Ivan Stratsimir in May or June. Within three months, his troops occupied Ivan Stratsimir's realm, which was organized into a separate border province, or banate, under the command of Hungarian lords.

The Byzantine Emperor, John V Palaiologos, visited Louis in Buda in early 1366, seeking his assistance against the Ottoman Turks, who had set foot in Europe. This was the first occasion that a Byzantine Emperor left his empire to plead for a foreign monarch's assistance. According to Louis's physician, Giovanni Conversini, at his first meeting with Louis, the emperor refused to dismount and to take off his hat, which offended Louis. John V pledged that he would promote the union of the Byzantine Church with the Papacy, and Louis promised to send him help, but neither the emperor nor Louis fulfilled their promises. Pope Urban encouraged Louis not to send help to Constantinople before the emperor guaranteed the Church union.

Louis stayed in Transylvania between June and September 1366, implying that he waged war against Moldavia. He issued a decree authorising the Transylvanian noblemen to pass judgments against "malefactors belonging to any nation, especially Romanians". He also decreed that testimony of a Romanian Knez who had received a royal charter of grant weighed the same as that of a nobleman. In the same year, Louis granted the Banate of Severin and the district of Fogaras to Vladislav I of Wallachia, who had accepted his suzerainty. Tvrtko I of Bosnia also accepted Louis's suzerainty after Hungarian troops assisted him in regaining his throne in early 1367.

Louis made attempts to convert his pagan or "schismatic" subjects to Catholicism, even by force. The conversion of the pagan Cumans who had settled in Hungary a century before was completed during his reign, according to John of Küküllő. After the conquest of Vidin, he sent Franciscan friars to the new banate to convert the local Orthodox population, which caused widespread discontent among the Bulgarians. In 1366, he ordered that all Serbian priests be converted and rebaptised. He also decreed that only Roman Catholic noblemen and knezes were allowed to hold landed property in the district of Sebes in Temes County. Louis supported the religious orders, especially the Franciscans and the Paulines, for whom he and his mother set up dozens of new monasteries. Upon Louis's request, Pope Urban V sanctioned the establishment of a university in Pécs in 1367, with the exception of a faculty of theology. However, Louis did not arrange for sufficient revenues and the university was closed by 1390.

Vladislav I of Wallachia made an alliance with Ivan Shishman, a half-brother of the former ruler of Vidin, Ivan Sratsimir. Their united armies imposed a blockade on Vidin. Louis marched to the Lower Danube and ordered Nicholas Lackfi, Voivode of Transylvania, to invade Wallachia in the autumn of 1368. The voivode's army marched through the valley of the Ialomița River, but the Wallachians ambushed it and killed many Hungarian soldiers, including the voivode. Vladislav I of Wallachia occupied Vidin in early 1369. However, Louis's campaign against Wallachia from the west was successful and the Wallachian voivode yielded to him the next summer. Upon his initiative, Louis restored Ivan Stratsimir in Vidin. Ivan Stratsimir swore loyalty to Louis and sent his two daughters as hostages to Hungary.

From the late 1360s, Louis suffered from a skin disease with symptoms similar to leprosy. Thereafter, he became even more zealous and dedicated more time to praying and religious contemplation. After his meeting with Louis in 1372, the papal legate, John de Cardailhac, stated: "I call God as my witness that I have never seen a monarch more majestic and more powerful ... or one who desires peace and calm as much as he." He also changed the priorities of his foreign policy and began neglecting the Balkan states. Casimir III of Poland and Louis signed a treaty against Emperor Charles IV in Buda in February 1369. At their next meeting in Pressburg (now Bratislava in Slovakia) in September, Albert I of Bavaria, and Rupert I of the Palatinate joined their coalition against the emperor and the Habsburgs. However, Emperor Charles IV persuaded the two Wittelsbachs (Albert I and Rupert I) to break off the coalition in September 1370.

=== Union with Poland and reforms (1370–1377) ===
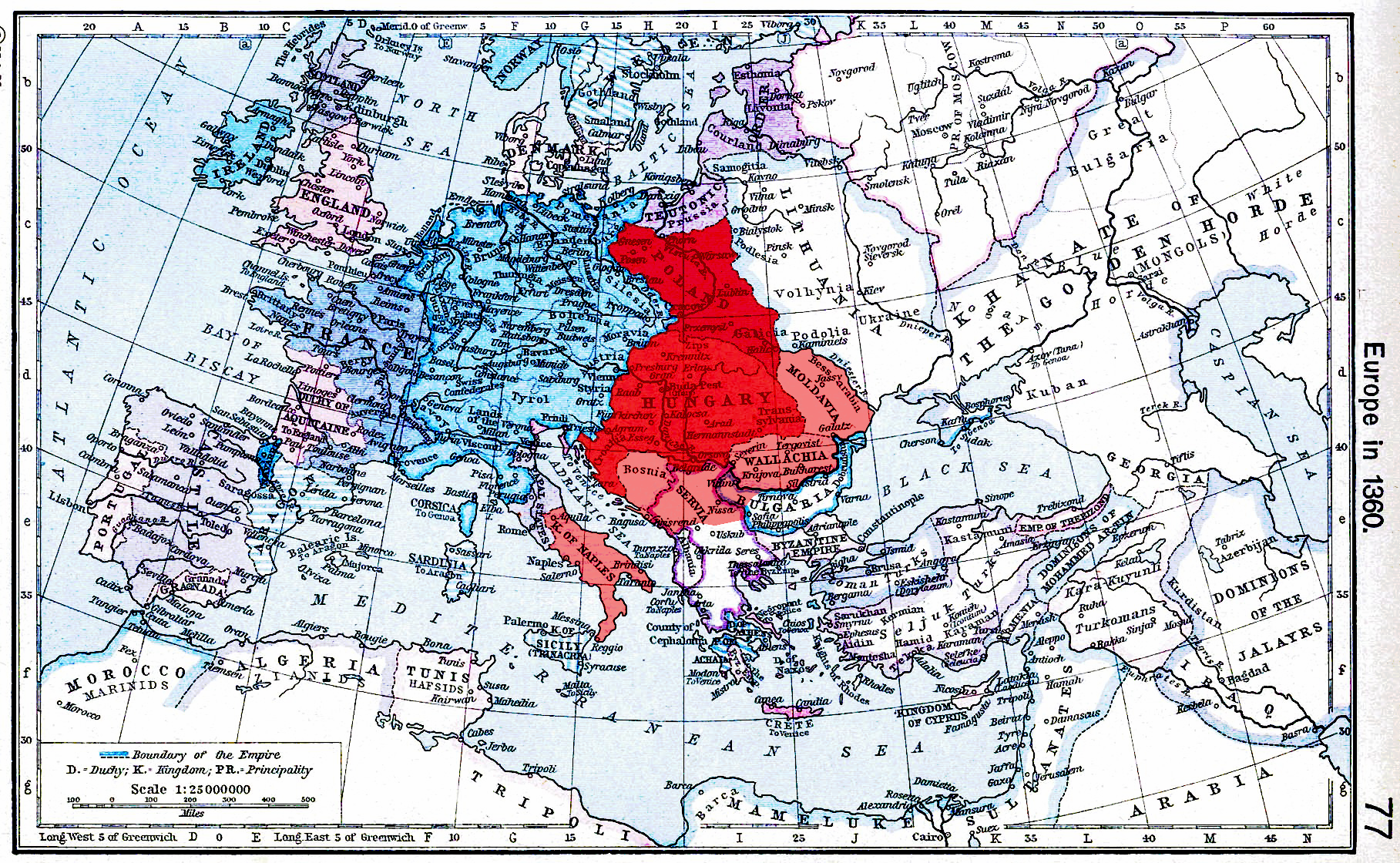
Lands ruled by King Louis the Great: Personal union between the Kingdom of Hungary and the Kingdom of Poland in 1370–1382 are colored red, the vassal states and the temporarily controlled territories are coloured light red

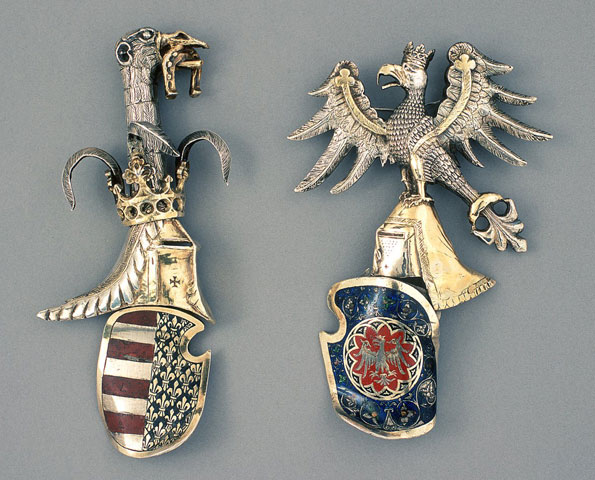
Hungarian coat of arms with Angevin helmet and Polish Coat of Arms (1340s)

Casimir III of Poland died on 5 November 1370. Louis arrived after his uncle's funeral and ordered the erection of a splendid Gothic marble monument to the deceased king. Louis was crowned king of Poland in the Kraków Cathedral on 17 November 1370. Casimir III had willed his patrimony – including the duchies of Sieradz, Łęczyca and Dobrzyń – to his grandson, Casimir IV, Duke of Pomerania. However, the Polish prelates and lords were opposed to the disintegration of Poland and Casimir III's testament was declared void. Louis visited Gniezno and made his Polish mother, Elizabeth, regent before returning to Hungary in December. His uncle's two surviving daughters (Anna and Jadwiga) accompanied him, and the Polish Crown Jewels were transferred to Buda, which raised discontent among Louis's new subjects. Louis's wife gave birth to a daughter, Catherine, in 1370, seventeen years after their marriage; a second daughter, Mary, was born in 1371. Thereafter Louis's made several attempts to safeguard his daughters' right to succeed him.

During a war between Emperor Charles IV and Stephen II, Duke of Bavaria, Louis intervened on the duke's behalf and the Hungarian army invaded Moravia. After the duke and the emperor signed a peace treaty, Louis and the emperor agreed upon the betrothal of their children early the next year. The Ottomans annihilated the Serbian armies in the Battle of Marica on 26 September 1371. Lazar Hrebeljanović, one of the Serbian lords, swore loyalty to Louis. Pope Gregory XI urged Louis to resist the Ottomans but also pleaded with him to send reinforcements to Italy to fight against Bernabò Visconti. A war broke out between the Republic of Venice and Francesco I da Carrara, Lord of Padova, who was an ally of Louis, in the summer of 1372. Louis sent reinforcements to Italy to assist Francesco da Carrara. The Venetians defeated the Hungarian troops at Treviso and captured its commander, Nicholas Lackfi, forcing Louis I to sign a peace treaty on 23 September 1373.

Louis and the representatives of the Polish nobility started negotiations of Louis's succession in Poland in the autumn of 1373. After a year of negotiations, he issued the so-called Privilege of Koszyce on 17 September 1374, reducing the tax that Polish noblemen paid to the king by about 84% and promising remuneration to noblemen who participated in foreign military campaigns. In exchange, the Polish lords confirmed the right of Louis's daughters to inherit Poland.

Louis invaded Wallachia in May 1375 because the new prince of Wallachia, Radu I, had formed an alliance with the Bulgarian ruler, Ivan Shishman, and the Ottoman Sultan Murad I. The Hungarian army routed the united forces of the Wallachians and their allies, and Louis occupied the Banate of Severin, but Radu I did not yield. During the summer, Wallachian troops stormed into Transylvania and Ottomans pillaged the Banat.

From the middle of the 1370s, the Lackfi's influence diminished and new favorites emerged in the royal court. James Szepesi was appointed judge royal in 1373, and Nicholas I Garai became the palatine in 1375. The organization of central government was also modified to create a more centralized power structure. Louis's "secret seal", which he had always taken with him during his wars and journeys, was declared authentic, and Louis entrusted it to the secret chancellor who was always to accompany him. A new high official, the Lord Chancellor were authorized to use the great seal in the king's name in 1376 or 1377. Demetrius, Bishop of Zagreb, who was of humble origin, was the first to hold this new office. The Lord Chancellor became the head of a new central court of justice, called the court of "the king's special presence" in 1377. From around the same time, the royal free towns delegated jurors to assist the master of the treasury, who headed the court of appeal for the towns. A new official, the treasurer, took over the financial duties of the master of the treasury.

The Lithuanians made raids in Halych, Lodomeria, and Poland, almost reaching Kraków in November 1376. A riot broke out in Kraków against the unpopular queen mother, Elizabeth, on 6 December. The rioters slaughtered about 160 servants of the queen-mother, forcing her to flee to Hungary. Taking advantage of the situation, Władysław the White, Duke of Gniewkowo, who was a male member of the royal Piast dynasty, announced his claim to the Polish crown. However, Louis's partisans defeated the pretender, and Louis made him abbot of the Pannonhalma Archabbey in Hungary. Louis appointed Vladislaus II of Opole his governor in Poland. In summer 1377, Louis invaded the territories held by the Lithuanian prince, George, in Lodomeria. His Polish troops soon captured Chełm, while Louis seized George's seat, Belz, after besieging it for seven weeks. He incorporated the occupied territories in Lodomeria, together with Galicia, into the Kingdom of Hungary. Three Lithuanian princes – Fedor, Prince of Ratno, and two princes of Podolia, Alexander and Boris – accepted Louis's suzerainty.

=== Last years (1377–1382) ===
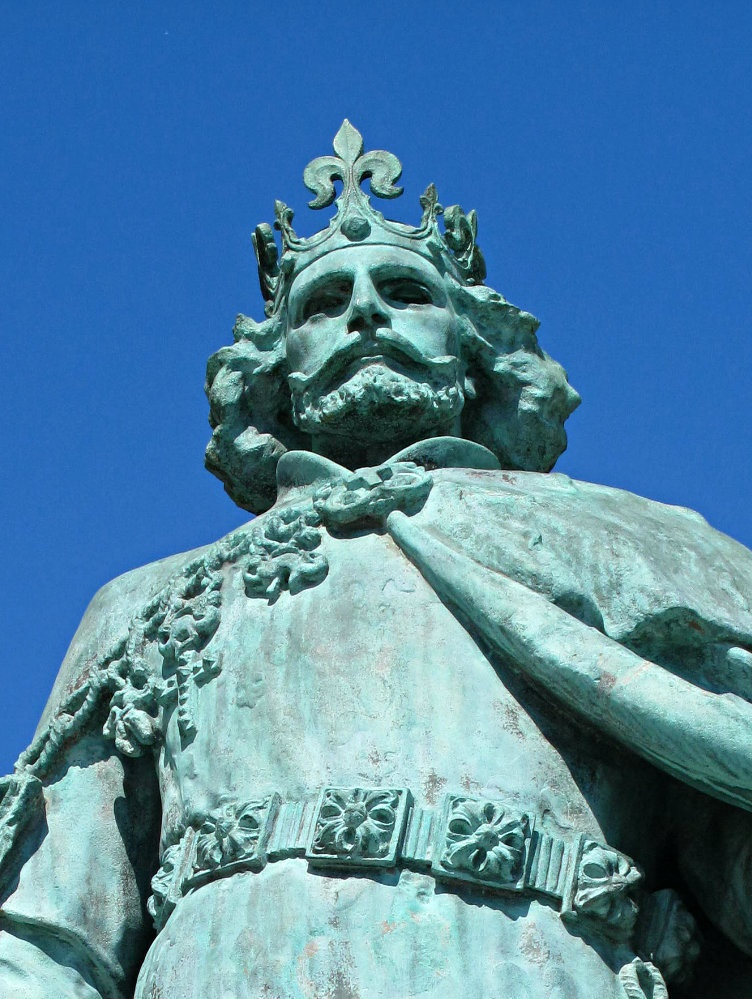
Louis on Heroes Square, Budapest

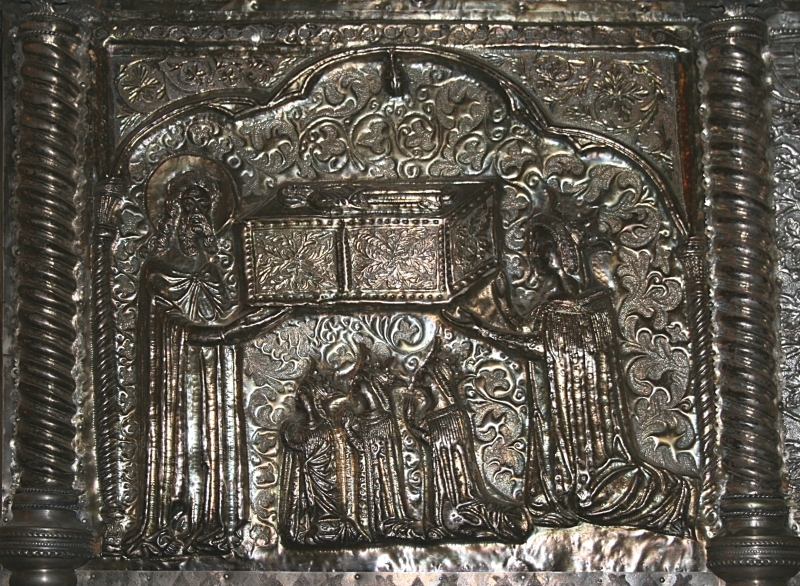
Louis's second wife, Elizabeth of Bosnia and their three daughters

Tvrtko I of Bosnia had himself crowned king, adopting the title of "King of Serbia, Bosnia and the Coastland", in 1377. Whether Louis had approved Tvrtko's coronation cannot be decided. A new war broke out between Venice and Genoa in 1378. Louis supported the Genoese and Trogir became the regular base of the Genoese fleet, which transformed Dalmatia into an important theater of war. Louis also sent reinforcements to Francesco I da Carrara to fight against the Venetians.

The cardinals who had turned against Pope Urban VI elected a new pope, Antipope Clement VII on 20 September 1378, which gave rise to the Western Schism. Louis acknowledged Urban VI as the legitimate pope and offered him support to fight against his opponents in Italy. As Joanna I of Naples decided to join Clement VII's camp, Pope Urban VI excommunicated and dethroned her on 17 June 1380. The pope acknowledged Charles III of Naples, who had lived in Louis's court, as the lawful king of Naples. After Charles III of Naples promised that he would not claim Hungary against Louis's daughters, Louis dispatched him to invade Southern Italy at the head of a large army. Within a year, Charles III of Naples occupied the Kingdom of Naples and forced Queen Joanna to surrender to him on 26 August 1381.

The envoys of Louis and Venice had meanwhile started negotiations on a new peace treaty, which was signed in Turin on 24 August 1381. According to the treaty, Venice renounced Dalmatia and also promised to pay 7,000 golden florins as an annual tribute to Hungary. Louis also stipulated that Venice was to transfer the relics of St Paul of Thebes to the newly established Pauline monastery at Budaszentlőrinc.

Royal charters referred to military actions in Lodomeria and Wallachia in the first half of 1382, but no further information of those wars was preserved. Louis, whose health was quickly deteriorating, invited the representatives of the Polish prelates and lords for a meeting in Zólyom (now Zvolen in Slovakia). Upon his demand, the Poles swore loyalty to his daughter, Mary, and her fiancé, Sigismund of Luxemburg, on 25 July 1382. Louis died in Nagyszombat (now Trnava in Slovakia) in the night on 10 or 11 September 1382. He was buried in the Székesfehérvár Cathedral in a chapel that had been built upon his orders.

== Family ==
Ancestors of Louis I of Hungary

8. Charles II of Naples
4. Charles Martel of Anjou
9. Mary of Hungary
2. Charles I of Hungary
10. Rudolph I of Germany
5. Klementia of Habsburg
11. Gertrude of Hohenberg
1. Louis I of Hungary
12. Casimir I of Kuyavia
6. Władysław I of Poland
13. Euphrosyne of Opole
3. Elisabeth of Poland
14. Bolesław the Pious
7. Hedwig of Kalisz
15. Yolanda of Hungary

Louis's first wife, Margaret, was the oldest child of Charles, Margrave of Moravia, and his first wife, Blanche of Valois. Margaret was born in 1335. The exact date of the marriage of Louis and Margaret is unknown, but it occurred between 1342 and 1345. Margaret died childless on 7 September 1349.

According to the Chronicle of Parthénope, the Neapolitan princes whom Louis had imprisoned during his first campaign in Southern Italy proposed that he marry Queen Joanna I's younger sister and heir, Mary. She was the widow of Charles of Durazzo, who had been executed on Louis's orders. During the siege of Aversa in the summer of 1350, Louis met her envoy in the nearby Trentola-Ducenta and the terms of their marriage were accepted. However, Mary was forced to marry Robert of Baux after Louis left Southern Italy.

Louis married his second wife, Elizabeth, around 20 June 1353. Elizabeth was the daughter of Stephen II, Ban of Bosnia, and Stephen's wife, Elizabeth of Kuyavia. Louis and his new wife were within the prohibited degree of kinship, because Louis's mother and his wife's grandmother were cousins, but they applied for a papal dispensation only about four months after their marriage. Historian Iván Bertényi says that this haste suggests that Elizabeth, who had been living in the court of Louis's mother, was pregnant at the time of the marriage. If this theory is valid, Louis's and his wife's first child was stillborn. Their next child, Catherine, was born in 1370 and died in 1378. The next daughter, Mary, who would succeed Louis in Hungary, was born in 1371. Louis's youngest daughter, Jadwiga, who was born in 1373, became queen regnant of Poland.

== Legacy ==
Louis was the only Hungarian monarch to receive the epithet "Great". He was mentioned under this byname not only in Hungarian chronicles in the 14th and 15th centuries, but also in a 17th-century genealogy of the Capetians. Both his chivalrous personality and his successful military campaigns contributed to the development of his fame as a "great king". Louis waged wars in almost each year during his reign. Louis "always desired peace at home and war abroad for neither can be made without the other", according to Antonio Bonfini's late 15th century chronicle. Historian Enikő Csukovits writes that Louis' military actions show that he continued and accomplished his father's policy through recovering Croatia and Dalmatia and waging wars in Southern Italy, in Lithuania and in the Balkan Peninsula. On the other hand, Pál Engel says that Louis's "expeditions often lacked a realistic goal and sometimes even a reasonable pretext ... it was war itself that gave him pleasure".

In the age of Romantic nationalism, Hungary during Louis's reign was described as an empire "whose shores were washed by three seas" in reference to the Adriatic, Baltic and Black Seas. For instance, in 1845 the poet Sándor Petőfi referred to Louis's reign as a period when "the falling stars of the north, the east and the south were all extinguished in Hungarian seas". Poland remained an independent country during Louis's reign and its borders did not extend to the Baltic Sea, and Louis' suzerainty along the northwestern shores of the Black Sea was also uncertain.

In Polish historiography, two contrasting evaluations of Louis' reign in Poland coexisted. The "pessimistic" tradition can be traced back to the views of the late 14th century Jan of Czarnków, who was banished from Poland during Louis' reign. Czarnków emphasized that "there was no stability in the Kingdom of Poland" and the royal officials "continually pillaged the property of the poor people" during Louis' reign. According to the "optimistic" historiographic tradition, Louis continued Casimir the Great's policy of preserving the unity of Poland against the separatist magnates of Greater Poland with the assistance of lords from Lesser Poland.

John of Küküllő emphasized that Louis "ruled neither with passion, nor with arbitrariness, but rather as the guardian of righteousness". Antonio Bonfini also described Louis as a just king wandering among his subjects in disguise to protect them from the royal officials' arbitrary acts. Even Jan of Czarnków underlined that Louis "did not rule in an absolute manner; on the contrary, the foundations [...] of [the Poles'] freedom were laid by him".

New palaces and castles built at Zólyom, Diósgyőr and Louis's other favorite hunting places were "masterpieces of the highest European standards" of his age, according to historian László Kontler. Louis initiated the compellation of the Illuminated Chronicle, which preserved the text of earlier chronicles. The 147 miniatures decorating the Illuminated Chronicle testify to the mastery of Hungarian workshops during Louis' reign.

== Bibliography ==
=== Primary sources ===
- Długosz, Jan; Michael, Maurice (1997). The Annals of Jan Długosz: An English abridgement – Annales seu cronicae incliti regni Poloniae. Charlton, West Sussex: IM Publications. ISBN 978-1-901019-00-1. OCLC 37577645.
- Kálti, Márkus (1970) [1969]. Dercsényi, Dezső (ed.). The Hungarian Illuminated Chronicle: Chronica de Gestis Hungarorum. Translated by West, Alick. ISBN 978-0-8008-4015-0. OCLC 110699.

=== Secondary sources ===
- Божилов, Иван (1994). "Иван Срацимир, цар във Видин (1352/1353 – 1396) [Ivan Stratsimir, Tsar of Vidin]". Фамилията на Асеневци (1186–1460). Генеалогия и просопография [The Asen Family (1186–1460): Genealogy and Prosopography] (in Bulgarian). Българска академия на науките (Bulgarian Academy of Sciences). pp. 202–203. ISBN 954-430-264-6. OCLC 38087158.
- Bain, Robert Nisbet (1911). "Louis I. of Hungary" . In Chisholm, Hugh (ed.). Encyclopædia Britannica. Vol. 17 (11th ed.). Cambridge University Press. p. 49.
- Bartl, Július; Čičaj, Viliam; Kohútova, Mária; Letz, Róbert; Segeš, Vladimír; Škvarna, Dušan (2002). Slovak History: Chronology & Lexicon. Bolchazy-Carducci Publishers, Slovenské Pedegogické Nakladatel'stvo. ISBN 978-0-86516-444-4. OCLC 43607496. Partial preview at Google Books.
- Bertényi, Iván (1989). Nagy Lajos király [King Louis the Great] (in Hungarian). Budapest: Kossuth Könyvkiadó. ISBN 978-963-09-3388-9. OCLC 463409862.
- Cartledge, Bryan (2011). The Will to Survive: A History of Hungary. C. Hurst & Co. ISBN 978-1-84904-112-6. OCLC 1412550527 – via Internet Archive.
- Csukovits, Enikő (2012). "I. (Nagy) Lajos". In Gujdár, Noémi; Szatmáry, Nóra (eds.). Magyar királyok nagykönyve: Uralkodóink, kormányzóink és az erdélyi fejedelmek életének és tetteinek képes története [Encyclopedia of the Kings of Hungary: An Illustrated History of the Life and Deeds of Our Monarchs, Regents and the Princes of Transylvania] (in Hungarian). Reader's Digest Kiadó. pp. 116–119. ISBN 978-963-289-214-6. OCLC 827055657.
- Dümmerth, Dezső (1982). Az Anjou-ház nyomában [On the House of Anjou] (in Hungarian). Panoráma. ISBN 963-243-179-0. OCLC 12939065.
- Engel, Pál (2001). The Realm of St Stephen: A History of Medieval Hungary, 895–1526. London: I.B. Tauris. ISBN 978-1-4175-4080-8. OCLC 56676014.
- Fine, John V. A. (1994) [1987]. The Late Medieval Balkans: A Critical Survey from the Late Twelfth Century to the Ottoman Conquest. Ann Arbor, Michigan: University of Michigan Press. ISBN 978-0-472-10079-8.
- Franzl, Johan (2002). I. Rudolf: Az első Habsburg a német trónon [Rudolph I: The First Habsburg on the German Throne] (in Hungarian). Corvina. ISBN 978-963-13-5138-5. OCLC 909188050.
- Geanakoplos, Deno (1975). "Byzantium and the crusades". In Setton, Kenneth M.; Hazard, Harry W. (eds.). A History of the Crusades. Vol. 3: The Fourteenth and Fifteenth Centuries. University of Wisconsin Press. pp. 69–103. ISBN 978-0-299-06670-3. OCLC 802839370, 1023188754 – via Internet Archive.
- Goldstone, Nancy (2009). The Lady Queen: The Notorious Reign of Joanna I, Queen of Naples, Jerusalem, and Sicily. Bloomsbury Publishing. ISBN 978-0-8027-7770-6. OCLC 965721878 – via Internet Archive.
- Halecki, Oskar (1991). Jadwiga of Anjou and the Rise of East Central Europe. Polish Institute of Arts and Sciences of America. ISBN 978-0-88033-206-4. OCLC 24866585.
- Housley, Norman (April 1984). "King Louis the Great of Hungary and the Crusades, 1342–1382". The Slavonic and East European Review. 62 (2). University College London, School of Slavonic and East European Studies: 192–208. ISSN 0037-6795. JSTOR 4208851. OCLC 9974614194.
- Ioniță, Adrian; Kelemen, Beatrice; Simon, Alexandru (2017). AL WA: Prințul Negru al Vlahiei și vremurile sale [AL WA: The Black Prince of Wallachia and his times] (in Romanian). Cluj-Napoca: Academia Română - Centrul de Studii Transilvane, Editura Argonaut. ISBN 9786068694719 – via Academia.edu.
- Kłoczowski, Jerzy (1986). "Louis the Great as King of Poland as Seen in the Chronicle of Janko of Czarnkow". In Várdy, Steven Béla; Grosschmid, Géza; Domonkos, Leslie (eds.). Louis the Great, King of Hungary and Poland. Boulder. pp. 129–154. ISBN 978-0-88033-087-9. OCLC 16874718.
- Knoll, Paul W. (1972). The Rise of the Polish Monarchy: Piast Poland in East Central Europe, 1320–1370. Chicago: University of Chicago Press. ISBN 978-0-226-44826-8. OCLC 1151172428 – via Internet Archive.
- Kontler, László (1999). Millennium in Central Europe: A History of Hungary. Budapest: Atlantisz Publishing House. ISBN 978-963-9165-37-3. OCLC 43955788.
- Kristó, Gyula (1988). Az Anjou-kor háborúi [Wars in the Age of the Angevins] (in Hungarian). Budapest: Zrínyi Kiadó. ISBN 978-963-326-905-3. OCLC 20810135.
- Kristó, Gyula; Engel, Pál; Makk, Ferenc, eds. (1994). Korai magyar történeti lexikon (9–14. század) [Encyclopedia of the Early Hungarian History (9th–14th centuries)] (in Hungarian). Budapest: Akadémiai Kiadó. ISBN 978-963-05-6722-0. OCLC 32052132.
- Kristó, Gyula (2003). "I. Lajos (Nagy Lajos)". In Kristó, Gyula (ed.). Magyarország vegyes házi királyai [The Kings of Various Dynasties of Hungary] (in Hungarian). Szukits Könyvkiadó. pp. 45–66. ISBN 978-963-9441-58-3. OCLC 1015015791.
- Lukowski, Jerzy; Zawadski, Hubert (2006). A Concise History of Poland. Cambridge University Press. ISBN 978-0-521-61857-1. OCLC 881237432.
- Magaš, Branka (2007). Croatia Through History. London: SAQI. ISBN 978-0-86356-775-9. OCLC 1422252863 – via Internet Archive.
- Makkai, László (1994). "The Emergence of the Estates (1172–1526)". In Köpeczi, Béla; Barta, Gábor; Bóna, István; Makkai, László; Szász, Zoltán; Borus, Judit (eds.). History of Transylvania. Budapest: Akadémiai Kiadó. pp. 178–243. ISBN 978-963-05-6703-9. OCLC 1417380836 – via Internet Archive.
- Patai, Raphael (1996). The Jews of Hungary: History, Culture, Psychology. Detroit: Wayne State University Press. ISBN 978-0-8143-4192-6. OCLC 1097103912.
- Pop, Ioan-Aurel (2006). "Romanians in the 14th–16th Centuries: From the "Christian Republic" to the "Restoration of Dacia"". In Pop, Ioan-Aurel; Bolovan, Ioan (eds.). History of Romania: Compendium. Romanian Cultural Institute (Center for Transylvanian Studies). pp. 209–314. ISBN 978-973-7784-12-4. OCLC 123906375.
- Sălăgean, Tudor (2006). "Romanian Society in the Early Middle Ages (9th–14th Centuries AD)". In Pop, Ioan-Aurel; Bolovan, Ioan (eds.). History of Romania: Compendium. Romanian Cultural Institute (Center for Transylvanian Studies). pp. 133–207. ISBN 978-973-7784-12-4. OCLC 123906375.
- Setton, Kenneth M. (1976). The Papacy and the Levant (1204–1571), Volume I: The Thirteenth and Fourteenth Centuries. Vol. 1. Philadelphia: The American Philosophical Society. ISBN 0-87169-114-0. OCLC 162344748
- Solymosi, László; Körmendi, Adrienne (1981). "A középkori magyar állam virágzása és bukása, 1301–1506 [The Heyday and Fall of the Medieval Hungarian State, 1301–1526]". In Solymosi, László (ed.). Magyarország történeti kronológiája, I: a kezdetektől 1526-ig [Historical Chronology of Hungary, Volume I: From the Beginning to 1526] (in Hungarian). Budapest: Akadémiai Kiadó. pp. 188–228. ISBN 978-963-05-2661-6. OCLC 313143718.
- Spinei, Victor (1986). Moldavia in the 11th–14th centuries. Bucharest: Editura Academiei Republicii Socialiste Româna. OCLC 16226571.
- Tringli, István (1997). "The Age of the Angevine Dynasty". Encyclopaedia Humana Hungarica. Vol. 3: Knight Kings: the Anjou and Sigismund Age in Hungary (1301–1437). Budapest: Encyclopaedia Humana Association.

Louis I of Hungary Capetian House of Anjou Cadet branch of the Capetian dynasty Born: 5 March 1326 Died: 10 September 1382
Regnal titles
Vacant Title last held by Stephen	Duke of Transylvania; 1339 – 1342	Vacant Title next held by Stephen
Preceded by Charles I	King of Hungary and Croatia; 1342 – 1382	Succeeded by Mary
Preceded by Casimir III	King of Galicia-Volhynia; 1370 – 1382	Succeeded by Mary
Preceded by Casimir III	King of Poland; 1370 – 1382	Vacant Title next held by Jadwiga
