= Ivaniš Nelipić =

Croatian nobleman

- Duke of Omiš; Duke of Dalmatian cities Duke of Cetina
- Born: before 1379
- Died: 1435
- Noble family: Nelipić noble family
- Spouse: Elizabeth Bubek
- Issue: Catherine Nelipić; Margarethe Nelipič
- Father: Ivan II Nelipić

Ivaniš Nelipić or Ivan III Nelipić (before 1379–1435) was a Croatian nobleman who was prince of Cetina and Omiš. He was also titular Ban of Croatia and Dalmatia in 1419 and was a member of one of the most powerful Croatian noble families at the time. At the peak of his power, he ruled areas in inner Croatia from the mountain of Velebit to the Cetina river. From 1401 to 1435, he ruled over Klis Fortress, although his main seat was at Knin in Knin Fortress. During his reign, he was greatly involved in conflicts over Bosnia. Later, he was also recognized as the duke of the Dalmatian cities, specifically Trogir, Split and Skradin.

== Biography ==
Ivaniš was born before 1379 to Ivan II Nelipić and his wife Margarethe, who was from the Split noble family Merini. He inherited the territories held by the family around the river Cetina. He was mentioned as Duke of Trogir in 1393 and as Duke of Split in 1403. During the dynastic wars, he was initially supportive of Ladislaus of Naples, from whom he received Skradin and Klis. From 1406, he sided with Sigismund and lost Skradin, but kept Klis. In 1415, he is mentioned to be in a conflict with the Ottomans. In 1416, he also acquired the town of Omiš. He married Elizabeth Bubek, daughter of the Palatine of Hungary Detrik Bubek. From this point on, he is self-titled as Ban of Dalmatia and Croatia in the charters he issues. He died in 1435.

== Family ==
Ivaniš, grandson of powerful Croatian nobleman Ivan Nelipić, was the last male member of the Nelipić noble family. According to his will, his daughter Princess Catherine Nelipić was to inherit all of his extensive possessions from the Velebit ranges to the Cetina river. She married Ivan Frankopan, who ruled as Ban of Croatia from 1432 to 1436. The Prince's other daughter, Margarita Nelipić, married Prince Kurjaković. His sister, Jelena Nelipčić, was married firstly to the most powerful Croatian nobleman in Bosnia, Duke Hrvoje Vukčić Hrvatinić, and later to Stephen Ostoja, the King of Bosnia.

== See also ==
- Ivan Nelipić
- Jelena Nelipić

Ivaniš Nelipić Born: 1379 Died: 1434
Political offices
Preceded by John Albeni	Ban of Croatia and Dalmatia; 1419	Succeeded by Albert Nagymihályi
