= Ivan Nelipčić =

Croatian magnate

Ivan Nelipčić (Latin: Johannes Nelipcich, 1344–1379) or Ivan II Nelipić, was a Croatian magnate, the knez of Cetina, gospodar of Sinj, a member of the Nelipić family. He was the son of Ivan Nelipić (d. 1344) and Vladislava Kurjaković. With Margareta Merini from Split, he had a son, knez Ivaniš, and daughter, Jelena.

Ancestors of Ivan Nelipčić

8. Isan Nelipić
4. Juraj Nelipić
9. Unknown
2. Ivan Nelipić
10. Unknown
5. Unknown
11. Unknown
1. Ivan Nelipčić/Ivan II
12. Unknown
6. Kurjak Gusić
13. Unknown
3. Vladislava Kurjaković
14. Unknown
7. Unknown
15. Unknown
