= Vladislava Kurjaković =

Croatian noblewoman

Vladislava Kurjaković (c. 1303 – after 1346) was a Croatian noblewoman who was the duchess of Knin as the wife of duke Ivan Nelipić. She was a daughter of Kurjak Gusić, count of Krbava and a maternal niece of Ban of Croatia Paul I Šubić of Bribir. She was married to the Duke of Knin and Cetina Ivan Nelipić, with whom she had a son, Ivan.

== Biography ==
Following her husband's death in 1344, she took control of her husband's possessions as her son's guardian and continued to resist the rule of the king in the north. A royal army numbering about 4,000 soldiers under the Slavonian ban Nikola Banffy eventually invaded her territories and besieged Knin during September and October 1344. Protected by significant fortifications, the ban was unable to storm the city, and instead pillaged the surrounding villages before mounting the hill Spas in a final attempt. Vladislava initially promised him she would submit to king Louis I of Hungary, but subsequently changed her stance as the army withdrew.

She was also aided by the Republic of Venice, and signed an agreement with their delegates in the main hall of the palace in the Knin Castle, which enacted military support and trade agreements. As a result of this, another siege was laid to Knin by Nikola in 1345 together with the Ban of Bosnia Stjepan I Kotromanić as the main royal army under Louis I slowly approached consisting of tens of thousands of soldiers in total.

Both of these acts finally pressured Vladislava to sign a contract with the two bans in July 1345, during which she ceded the castles of Knin, Ostrog, Počitelj, Srb, and Unac to the king. The contract also confirmed her possession of Cetina and promised her the fortress of Klis (then under the control of Mladen III Šubić). Her son was granted absolution along with court titles and some land in Hungary. In spite of this resolution, Vladislava was not happy, and spent the rest of her years in a voluntary exile in Split (since 1346), which was then under the control of the Republic of Venice.
