= Ivan Nelipić =

Duke of Knin (d. 1344)

John Nelipić Ivan Nelipić
- Duke of Knin
- Died: 1344
- Noble family: Nelipić noble family
- Spouse: Vladislava Kurjaković
- Issue: Ivan II Nelipić
- Father: Juraj Nelipić

Ivan Nelipić (died 1344) was a local ruler and Duke of Knin (knez Knina), who also held Drniš and the region around the rivers Cetina, Čikola, Krka, and Zrmanja. He was a member of the Croatian Nelipić noble family. Following the fall of the Šubić noble family, Ivan Nelipić seized Knin and successfully repelled attacks from both King Charles I and the Šubić noble family, becoming the most powerful individual in Croatia between 1322 and 1344.

== Biography ==
Ivan Nelipić was a son of the nobleman George (Juraj) and had a brother Isan II, whose son Constantine was Nelipić's ally.

=== Rise of power ===
Ivan Nelipić's career began at the court of Mladen II Šubić of Bribir, where he held the title of Voivode. Consequently, he was among the nobles who revolted against Mladen's rule and saw his downfall at the 1322 Battle of Bliska. He then expelled the royal forces from Knin and made the city his seat. He was supported by the three brothers of Mladen II Šubić; Juraj II Šubić, Grgur III Šubić and Pavao II Šubić.

=== Nelipac's plight ===
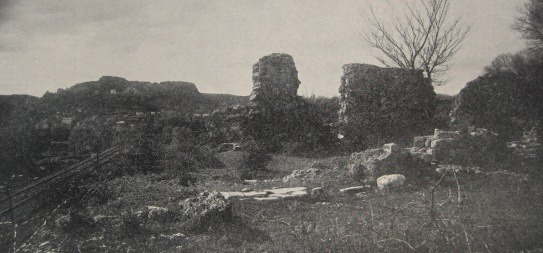
Ruins of Knin Cathedral, with Knin Castle in background

King Charles Robert ordered the new Ban of Slavonia Nicholas Felsőlendvai and Stepan II of Kotroman to launch a joint offensive against Nelipić in Croatia. Nicholas' expedition eventually failed, although, it did rise up Juraj II Šubić (brother of Mladen II Šubić) against Nelipić, as well as the Princes from Krka Frangepans, the City of Zadar and eventually, the Ban of Bosnia Stepan II himself. The movement wanted to return the Šubić dynasty to power in Croatia with Juraj II Šubić at the Throne. Stepan again changed allegiances and now fought for the Šubićs again. It all eventually turned into an all-out war when the armies of Prince Nelipac and Juraj II Šubić clashed near the waterfalls of Krka in the Summer of 1324. Stepan gave considerable support to the Šubićs, but he did not dare involve into the fight himself. It was good that he didn't, because the Šubić's party was massacred near Knin and Juraj II Šubić himself was captured by Prince Nelipić soon. Stepan had attempted to liberate Juraj II from imprisonment, but all attempts failed.

Prince Nelipić immediately pushed the fight against Stepan II. Nelipić managed to conquer the city of Visuć, but Stepan's long-ago given privileges to the nobility had finally been proven useful, as Vuk of Vukoslav had helped him to retake the city. Although Stepan's military ambitions only relatively successful he continued to wage war against the enemies of the Šubićs. His target was the City of Trogir which was one of the major supporters of Nelipić's campaigning. Stepan has adopted a harsh tactic. His forces have raided Caravans from Trogir, which eventually forced its denizens to humbly sign peace and addressed to him as the high and mighty lord Stepan free ruler and master of Bosnia, Usora and Soli and many other places and Prince of the Hum. It is because of this that Stepan opened a conflict with the Republic of Dubrovnik regarding trade. Stepan was shown as a very tough negotiator and the negotiations have finally ended in 1326.

After seeing that Ban Nicholas Felsőlendvai was unable to weaken the position of Prince Nelipić, Hungarian King Charles I Robert deposed him. The new man for the job was one of his most trusted men, Mikcs Ákos. Ban Mikcs advanced to Croatia in the Summer of 1325. Bosnian Ban Stepan II sent squadrons of troops to assist him in his offensive. In 1326, Mikcs took the cities of the Babonić family advance deeper into Croatia, meeting with Stepan's reinforcements. The expedition eventually reached little success, so Mikcs sent a portion of his army to Bihać which would serve as defence against possible Nelipić's counterattacks and retreated to Hungary, to the King.

== Family connections ==
Ivan Nelipić had a nephew, Konstantin, who helped him in his reign. Soon after Nelipić's death in 1344, Konstantin also died 1355. Nelipić was married to princess Vladislava Kurjaković from Krbava and had a son Ivan II Nelipac.

== See also ==
- House of Šubić
- Stephen II, Ban of Bosnia
- Ivan III Nelipac (Ivaniš Nelipić)
