= Stephen III Babonić =

Croatian nobleman and oligarch

Stephen (III) Babonić
- Ban of Slavonia
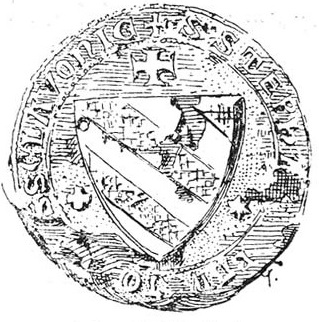
- Seal of Stephen Babonić, 1295
- Died: after 1295
- Noble family: House of Babonić
- Issue: Ladislaus; Stephen V
- Father: Stephen II

Stephen (III) Babonić (Croatian: Stjepan III. Babonić, Hungarian: Babonics (III.) István; died after 1295) was a powerful Croatian lord in the second half of the 13th century. As a member of the illustrious Babonić family, he established an oligarchic domain in Lower Slavonia, arbitrarily adopting the title Ban of Slavonia independently of the royal power. He is also referred to as Stephen of Vodičevo (Croatian: Stjepan Vodički, Hungarian: Vodicsai István) in contemporary sources.

== Early life ==
Stephen (III) was born into the Carniola (or Goricha) branch of the Babonić family, as the son of Stephen (II), who served as Ban of Maritime Provinces from 1243 to 1249. His brother was Radoslav (I), with whom they built the family's oligarchic power. According to Hrvoje Kekez, his another brother was Denis (I), who is mentioned by sources only once in 1266, when he was župan of Poljana and Pset. In this capacity, residing in Bihać, he ruled in favor of the Cistercians of Topusko against the locals of Poljana who had unjustly possessed some fishponds. However, other historians identified this lord with Hungarian baron Denis Péc.

Stephen first appears in contemporary records in 1264, when his brother Radoslav bought the estate Kolevrat, located south of the river Kupa and west of the stream Hutina, from local nobles Jakov and Stjepko, sons of Čvalko (from the relative Hutinjani family) in the name of his brother and his own. Subsequently, the Babonići built their fortress Steničnjak in the surrounding territory (called "terra Hutina"). Meanwhile their second cousins – Peter, Matthew, Christian and James – exchanged their portion Vodičevo for the estates Stojmerić, Deronicha and Boyna with Ban Roland Rátót in 1266. Prior to that, those estates were belonged to the properties of the Gutkeled clan, but King Béla IV of Hungary confiscated those from Joachim Gutkeled, who swore loyalty to rex iunior Stephen. The treaty stipulated that the exchange would be void if the Gutkeleds regained royal favor. In 1273, Stephen bought the land Hrapavci from a group of noblemen who had previously owned the said estate. His familiaris, a certain Zlobask, son of Gordos carried out the transaction before the cathedral chapter of Zagreb, on behalf of Stephen. The estate located around the river Korana, in the peripheral parts of Gorička County.

== Emergence as oligarch ==
=== 1277 rebellion ===
During their expansion in the region, Stephen and his family gradually came into conflict with the sphere of interests of the Kőszegis (mostly in Vrbas and Sana counties) and the Gutkeleds (Križevci and Zagreb counties), both were Hungarian families, who also acquired extensive landholdings in Slavonia. Stephen and Radoslav dominated the region between the rivers Kupa and Una. Their local interests were harmed by the fact that Joachim Gutkeled began to build an oligarchic province from the 1270s onwards, using his influence and position of Ban of Slavonia at the Hungarian royal court, where he served as a royal advisor to the minor Ladislaus IV of Hungary.

In late 1276 or early 1277, the Babonići under the leadership of Stephen and Radoslav rose up in rebellion in Slavonia. Utilizing their relations with the Duchy of Styria, the Babonići hired robber knights and mercenaries from there and began to plunder the possessions which had belonged to Joachim's territory in early 1277. Their attacks also affected the royal authority in the region. In order to suppress the revolt, Joachim gathered a royal army and marched into southern Slavonia, also involving four members of his wide kinship, including Hodos and Briccius, the forefather of the Báthory family. However, the royal troops suffered a disastrous defeat, Joachim Gutkeled was killed in a battle in April 1277, while Hodos lost his left arm and Briccius his finger of his right hand, and both of them were captured by the Styrian knights. The revolt was suppressed only by the arriving auxiliary troops of 200 knights and 120 archers, sent by Charles of Sicily in August 1277. They departed from Manfredonia and landed Dalmatia with twelve galleys under the marshals Giacomo Bursona and Guglielmo Brunello. Lajos Thallóczy connected the Babonić revolt with the aspirations of the Republic of Venice in Dalmatia. He argued Stephen Babonić swore loyalty to the pretender Andrew the Venetian already in that year. The Babonići were related to Albertino Morosini, Andrew's uncle, on some level.

=== 1278–1280 treaties ===
Under the mediation of the emissaries of Charles of Sicily and Girard, local master of the Knights Templar, the Kőszegis and the Babonići divided the Gutkeled's province between each other on the border of Transdanubia and Slavonia. In their agreement at Dubica on 20 April 1278, the Kőszegis and the Babonići divided the spheres of interest in Slavonia between each other. The Kőszegi brothers renounced territorial claims from all areas south of the river Sava (Slavonia inferior, "Lower Slavonia") in favor of Stephen Babonić and his clan, who acknowledged the Kőszegis' power north of the river at the same time. In accordance with the treaty, the area south of the Sava and west of the Una valley to the Kapela Mountains were declared as the private domain of the Babonići. The treaty was concluded with the will and consent of Duke Andrew, who arrived to Hungary upon the invitation of Ivan Kőszegi and adopted the title of "Duke of Slavonia, Dalmatia and Croatia".

In accordance with the treaty, the Kőszegis promised that they would not take up arms against the Babonići, even against a royal order, and would not support the Gutkeleds' blood revenge against them. During the conclusion, Stephen represented his family and wider kinship, i.e. his brother Radoslav, his cousin Nicholas (I) and the relative families. Stephen was able to retain the fort Steničnjak (Sztenicsnyák), an important stronghold of Joachim, which was taken from the latter's brother Nicholas Gutkeled. Stephen returned all the estates seized from the Kőszegis during the war, but he was allowed to keep the estates of the Gutkeleds. The treaty acknowledged that six counties, together with the privileged town of Petrinja, rightfully belong to Stephen and his relatives. The Kőszegis also allowed Stephen to retain Ozalj Castle. Whoever breaks the treaty must pay a fine of 2,000 marks; all parties offered hostages to guarantee the maintenance of peace. Stephen's second son, the child Stephen (V) was sent to Trani under the guardianship of the bishop of Dragonara upon the order of King Charles of Sicily in August 1278, who confirmed the Treaty of Dubica too. He was able to return his family sometime after October 1279. The document styled Stephen (III) with the honorific title "ban".

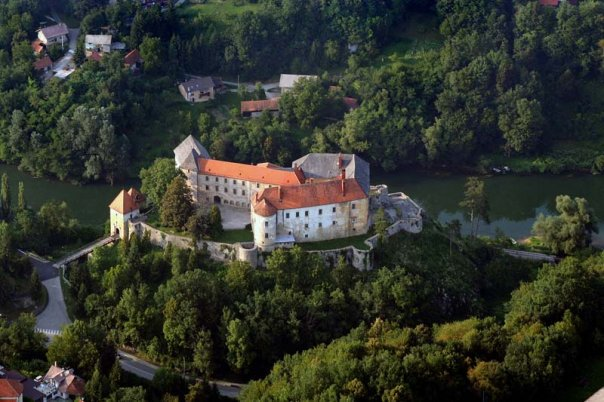
Ozalj Castle in Croatia

On the other hand, the Babonići continued to wage conflicts with the Gutkeleds during the summer and autumn of 1278. Ladislaus IV ceremonially reconciled with the Gutkeleds in June 1278, while around the same time, Ottokar II of Bohemia bribed the Babonići to plunder Styria, a realm of his rival Rudolf of Habsburg. Upon the mediation of Palatine Matthew Csák and Timothy, Bishop of Zagreb, along with local clergymen (on behalf of Ladislaus IV), Stephen and Radoslav, also representing their cousins Nicholas (I) and Stephen (IV) and their minor brothers, in addition to their wider kinship, reconciled with Nicholas, Stephen and Paul, the brothers of the late Joachim Gutkeled in Zagreb on 6 November 1278, ending the hostilities (blood feud) between the two families. In accordance with the treaty, Nicholas Gutkeled renounced his claim for Steničnjak in favor of Stephen Babonić, who had previously already took the fort and its surrounding territory as a pledge. In exchange, Stephen returned the lordship of Zlath (present-day Slavsko Polje) to Nicholas and his brothers. Nicholas also had to hand over the fort Krčin (Jhezera) to the relatives of the Babonić family. The Gutkeleds agreed that Stephen and his relatives would retain all their inherited and acquired estates in Podgorje, Sana counties and elsewhere, for which they had charters from royal courts, collegiate chapters or other institutions. Stephen Babonić and his kinship were also exempted from the judicial authority of the ban of Slavonia, if Nicholas Gutkeled takes the office. Instead, they placed under the authority of the bishop of Zagreb. Nicholas was also forbidden from demanding the payment of ban's taxes from the Babonići. Both parties were forbidden to lure each other's servants and serfs. King Ladislaus IV authorized the bishop of Zagreb to excommunicate any party that violated the terms of the peace. In addition, Stephen and Radoslav swore not to disturb the merchants of Senj. Powerful barons guaranteed the peace on behalf of the two parties, and Nicholas Gutkeled also sent his two sons as hostages to the court of Stephen Babonić, who was also styled as "ban" by the document.

Despite their reconciliation at Dubica and Zagreb, respectively, the Kőszegis and Gutkeleds continued their struggles against the Babonići throughout 1279. The ferocity of the conflict, as well as the fact that it affected political stability beyond the borders of medieval Slavonia, is evidenced by the fact that on 1 July 1279, Lodomer, the newly appointed Archbishop of Esztergom threatened all the warring parties – the three families and their allies – with excommunication if they did not adhere to the agreed truce signed before Bishop Timothy. Despite the warning, the fighting did not cease even in the first half of 1280. The Kőszegis could not come to terms with the fact that according to the terms of the peace, the Babonići achieved supremacy in almost all counties south of the Kupa and Sava rivers. Therefore Ladislaus IV sent his representatives to the region and ordered to summon the opponents to Ozalj Castle. The Kőszegi brothers – Nicholas, Ivan and Peter – appeared on the one hand, and Stephen (III), his brother Radoslav (I), and their cousins Nicholas (I) and Stephen (IV) from the Babonići, in addition to their allies, Dujam (II) and John (III), the counts of Veglia (Krk) and comes Grdun (Gárdony), who provided them military assistance, appeared on the other hand on 30 October 1280. In accordance with the treaty, the Babonići could keep all the estates that were donations from the king. They were granted the estates in the counties of Podgorje, Gorica, Drežnik, Gaj with Kladuš, Novigrad, and both Pset, and in Petrinja, and their ally, Grdun was confirmed to enjoy the village of Čeha and the estate of Hrašćina. Radoslav became the guarantor for peace. The chapter of Zagreb drafted the document on 17 November 1280.

== Lord of Lower Slavonia ==
=== Consolidation ===
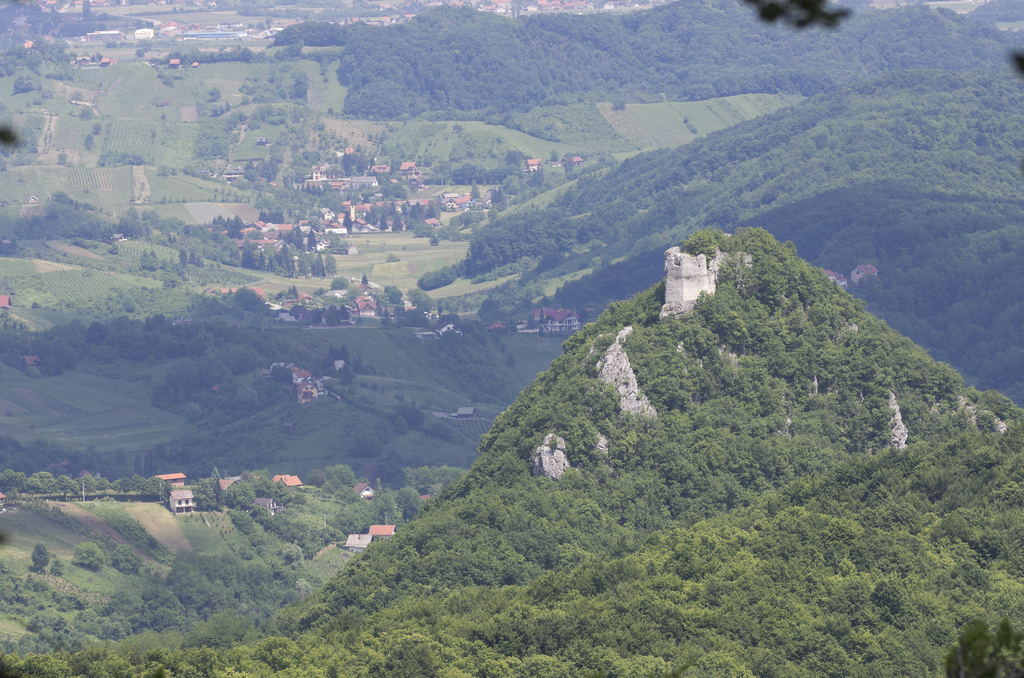
Okić Castle

Following the 1277–1280 large-scale clashes in Slavonia, Stephen Babonić, regulating to his estates, began consolidate his dominance in the area south of the Sava. He was helped in this endeavor by the fact that the Kőszegis were involved in a protracted conflict with Timothy, Bishop of Zagreb. By 1285, the Babonići gained influence over the counties of Vrbas (Orbász) and Sana, expelling the Kőszegis from the region. In May 1287, Prijezda I, Ban of Bosnia donated the županija Zemljanik as a dowry to his daughter Catherine, who married Ladislaus, the elder son of Stephen (III). Prijezda's three sons – Stephen, Prijezda II and Vuk – agreed with their father's gift. The towns of Ponikva, Kola and Bistrica were located within the donated county. The document styled Stephen (III) as ban too. In Hungarian historiography, Stephen is considered as a titular or honorary ban, who adopted the title arbitrarily, while earlier works write that he served in this capacity in 1278, 1287, 1289–1290 and 1295. In fact, he bore the title from 1278 until his death, and many local institutions and external powers have acknowledged this. In contrast, Croatian historian Hrvoje Kekez argued Stephen was made Ban of Slavonia sometime between 1273 and 1278.

Taking advantage of the decline of royal power since the 1280s, Stephen consolidated his family's power also in Gora, Gorica and Podgorje counties, i.e. in the area around the Samobor–Žumberak mountains and the valley that extends south of them. in addition to the process of strengthening their influence in the Vrbas and Sana river valleys, Stephen continued to strengthen the Babonići's influence in the Una river valley. In 1287, Stephen and Radoslav bought the estates of Pedalj and Stupnica (present-day boroughs of Dvor, Croatia) on the southeastern slopes of Zrinska Gora from Matthias and Rathold, sons of the late Roland Rátót. In 1289, Stephen bought the estate Drozgomet near the Maja river from the Ratetići. By purchasing these estates, the Babonići came into ownership of most of the former estates of the six clans of the mountain county around Zrinska Gora, where from the family originated. Under Stephen and Radoslav, the Babonići not only took over the largest estates at the foot of the Samobor–Žumberak mountains, but also acquired important fortresses towards the border with the Holy Roman Empire, including all the former fortresses of the Okić princes, such as Ozalj, Lipovac, Bregana and Okić itself by the early 1290s. There is no doubt that they were also helped in these efforts by the Cistercians from the abbey in Kostanjevica na Krki with whom the Babonići had established ties through their good connections with the Cistercians from Topusko.

By early 1290, Stephen and Radoslav were considered undisputed lords of Lower Slavonia, when they were among those barons of the realm to whom Pope Nicholas IV sent a letter, in which he informed them that he had appointed papal legate Benvenuto d'Orvieto and requested them to assist his work in order to persuade Ladislaus IV to return to Christianity. The papal letter also mentions their cousins, Nicholas (I) and Stephen (IV) in this respect. Pope Nicholas styled Stephen and Radoslav as bans of Slavonia, but this was only an honorary title, because members of the Kőszegis and Gutkeleds were given the same title simultaneously by the papal curia. At the beginning of the last decade of the 13th century, power in almost all royal counties south of the Sava was in the hands of Stephen and Radoslav. They ruled Gora, Gorica, Novigrad, Gaj, Podgorje, but also in both Pset counties, and in the counties of Vrbas, Sana and Zemljanik. The center of their power became the city of Steničnjak and the area between the rivers Sava, Kupa and Una.

=== Relations with the royalty ===
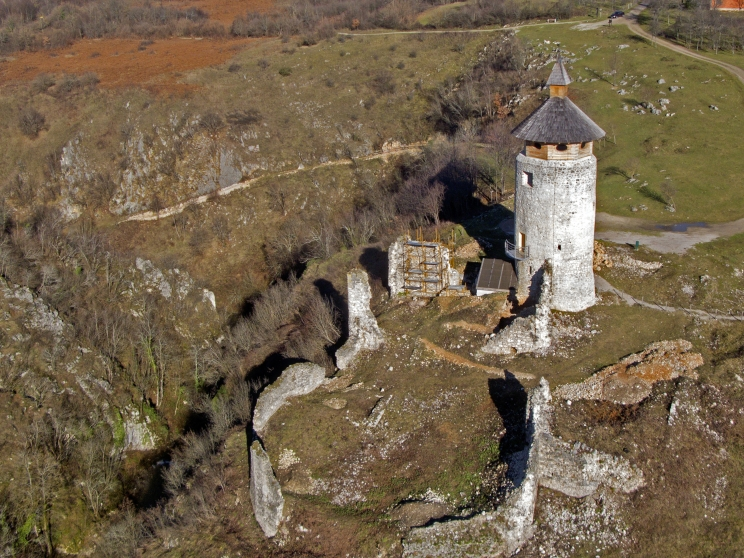
The castle of Drežnik in Croatia

Following the assassination of Ladislaus IV in July 1290, Andrew the Venetian ascended the Hungarian–Croatian throne. Initially, the Babonići were considered supporters of the new monarch. Soon, however, they recognized the advantages of cooperation with the Capetian House of Anjou, the ruling Neapolitan dynasty, who also laid claim to the Hungarian throne. Radoslav, Stephen's brother, personally visited their court to negotiate them already in the summer of 1291. The Angevins' presence forced Andrew III to take a more active policy in the area of medieval Slavonia. In February 1292, he granted the castle of Drežnik to Stephen at his express request. Hrvoje Kekez considered that during Stephen's entire life there is no indication of his possible contacts with the Neapolitan court. Namely, although he did not actively participate in wider political events related to the efforts of the Neapolitan dynasty to obtain the Hungarian–Croatian crown, nevertheless, his behavior shows his political stance and, thus, it is possible that he was satisfied with the current situation. In contrast, Radoslav pursued an active and dynamic policy, trying to strengthen his position within the family by balancing between Buda and Naples.

The relationship between Stephen and Radoslav became tense by the first half of the 1290s, which ended with their reconciliation before the Zagreb Chapter on 21 August 1294. Kekez considered that their conflict may have lasted since the early 1280s, as is evident from the fact that the brothers last appeared together at the signing of the peace treaty in Ozalj in 1280. It is possible their conflict of interest was the area along the Vrbas river and the provision on non-occupation of towns may have referred to precisely this border area (Zemljanik and Vrbas parishes). In addition, both of them held the title of ban, claiming the dignity for themselves. Kekez argued their conflict also resulted their different political orientations in the first half of the 1290s. The agreement in 1294 shows that the brothers forgot the harm they had done to each other. They jointly decided that from now on they would love each other as brothers and not fight over each other's heads. It was also agreed that they would not seize fortified cities and that neither side would help the other's enemies in wars. It was jointly decided that they would request the papal confirmation of peace and excommunication for the violator, and that whoever violated the terms of the peace would have to pay a fine of 1,000 marks.

In September 1294, Stephen bought a portion in Drozgomet from Zemko and his relatives. The land was located in the vicinity of the river Maja, i.e. in the center of the Babonić estate. On the same day, before the Zagreb Chapter, a certain Grboša sold his land along the Una River to Stephen. The estate was located along the Una River between Zakop and the property of the Diocese of Knin. Somewhat later, on 16 October 1294, Druško and his brothers sold their land in Turija and a vineyard in Švarča to Stephen before the Zagreb Chapter. Stephen (III) Babonić is last mentioned as a living person in January 1295, when he and his two sons – Ladislaus and Stephen (V) – were staying in their fortress of Zrin, when they donated some properties to the monastery of St. Mary in Kostanjevica. In contrast, Croatian historian Antun Nekić argued that Stephen (III) was still alive in 1301 and 1302 too, when he was referred to as "former ban". In the latter year, he and his two sons donated lands between Granje, Bročina and Maja to the altar of the Holy Cross in the Church of the Blessed Virgin Mary in Topusko. Hrvoje Kekez claimed the charter is wrongly dated.

== Sources ==
- Kekez, Hrvoje (2008). "Između dva kralja: plemićki rod Babonića u vrijeme promjene na ugarsko-hrvatskom prijestolju, od 1290. do 1309. godine [Between two kings: the Babonić family in the period of dynastic succession on the Croatian and Hungarian throne, 1290–1310]". Povijesni prilozi (in Croatian). 35. Croatian Institute of History: 61–89. ISSN 0351-9767.
- Kekez, Hrvoje (2011). Plemićki rod Babonića do kraja 14. stoljeća [The Noble Babonići Kindred until the End of the Fourteenth Century] (in Croatian). Doctoral thesis, University of Zagreb.
- Markó, László (2006). A magyar állam főméltóságai Szent Istvántól napjainkig: Életrajzi Lexikon [Great Officers of State in Hungary from King Saint Stephen to Our Days: A Biographical Encyclopedia] (in Hungarian). Helikon Kiadó. ISBN 963-547-085-1.
- Nekić, Antun (2015). "The Oligarchs and the King in Medieval Slavonia, 1301–1342". Südost Forschungen. 74 (1): 1–25. doi:10.1515/sofo-2015-0104. ISSN 2364-9321.
- Szűcs, Jenő (2002). Az utolsó Árpádok [The Last Árpáds] (in Hungarian). Osiris Kiadó. ISBN 963-389-271-6.
- Thallóczy, Lajos (1897). A Blagay-család oklevéltára. Codex diplomaticus comitum de Blagay [The Charters of the Blagay Family] (in Hungarian and Latin). Monumenta Hungariae Historica. Diplomataria 28, Hungarian Academy of Sciences.
