= Radoslav Babonić =

Croatian nobleman and oligarch

Radoslav (I) Babonić
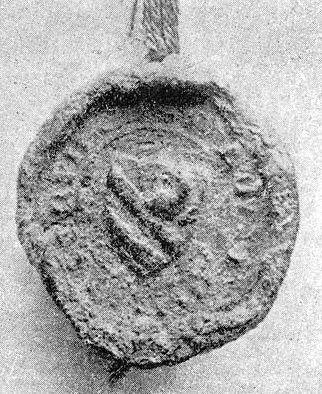
- Seal of Radoslav Babonić, 1278

Ban of Slavonia
- Reign: 1288; 1292; 1294
- Predecessor: Nicholas Kőszegi (1st term); Henry Kőszegi (2nd and 3rd term)
- Successor: Ivan Kőszegi (1st term); Henry Kőszegi (2nd term); James Borsa (3rd term)
- Died: after 1295
- Noble family: House of Babonić
- Issue: sons
- Father: Stephen II

Radoslav (I) Babonić (Croatian: Radoslav I. Babonić, Hungarian: Babonics (I.) Radoszló or Radiszló; died after 1295) was a powerful Croatian lord in the second half of the 13th century. As a member of the illustrious Babonić family, he established an oligarchic domain in Lower Slavonia together with his elder brother Stephen (III). He played an active role in inviting the Capetian House of Anjou to the Hungarian–Croatian throne.

== Early life ==
Radoslav (I) was born into the Carniola (or Goricha) branch of the Babonić family, as the son of Stephen (II), who served as Ban of Maritime Provinces from 1243 to 1249. His elder brother was Stephen (III), with whom they built the family's oligarchic power. In 1284 and 1285, Radoslav referred to Denis Péc as his "frater". It is possible they were half-brothers or were related on the maternal side.

He first appears in contemporary records in 1264, when he bought the estate Kolevrat, located south of the river Kupa and west of the stream Hutina, from local nobles Jakov and Stjepko, sons of Čvalko (from the relative Hutinjani family) in the name of his brother and his own. Subsequently, the Babonići built their fortress Steničnjak in the surrounding territory (called "terra Hutina"). Prior to that, Radoslav had already had some unidentified estates. When his brother Stephen bought the land Hrapavci from a group of noblemen who had previously owned the said estate in 1273, Radoslav already possessed neighboring lands around the river Korana, in the peripheral parts of Gorička County.

== Career ==
=== Rise to power ===
During their expansion in the region, Radoslav and his family gradually came into conflict with the sphere of interests of the Kőszegis (mostly in Vrbas and Sana counties) and the Gutkeleds (Križevci and Zagreb counties), both were Hungarian families, who also acquired extensive landholdings in Slavonia. Stephen and Radoslav dominated the region between the rivers Kupa and Una. Their local interests were harmed by the fact that Joachim Gutkeled began to build an oligarchic province from the 1270s onwards, using his influence and position of Ban of Slavonia at the Hungarian royal court, where he served as a royal advisor to the minor Ladislaus IV of Hungary.

In late 1276 or early 1277, the Babonići under the leadership of Stephen and Radoslav rose up in rebellion in Slavonia. Utilizing their relations with the Duchy of Styria, the Babonići hired robber knights and mercenaries from there and began to plunder the possessions which had belonged to Joachim's territory in early 1277. Their attacks also affected the royal authority in the region. In order to suppress the revolt, Joachim gathered a royal army and marched into southern Slavonia, but the royal troops suffered a disastrous defeat and Joachim Gutkeled was killed in a battle in April 1277. The revolt was suppressed only by the arriving auxiliary troops of 200 knights and 120 archers, sent by Charles of Sicily in August 1277.

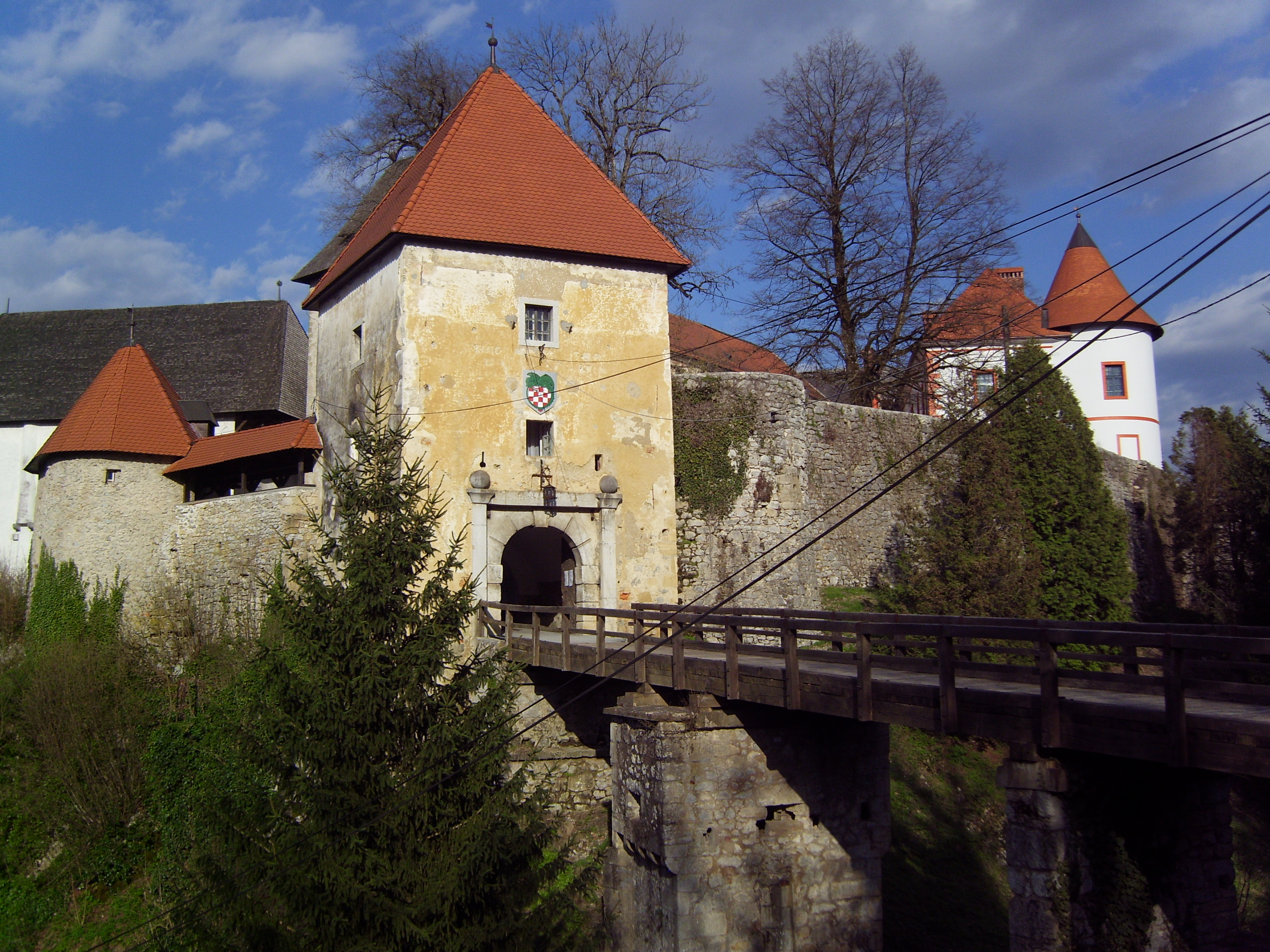
Ozalj Castle in Croatia

Under the mediation of the emissaries of Charles of Sicily and Girard, local master of the Knights Templar, the Kőszegis and the Babonići divided the Gutkeled's province between each other on the border of Transdanubia and Slavonia. In their agreement at Dubica on 20 April 1278, the Kőszegis and the Babonići divided the spheres of interest in Slavonia between each other. In accordance with the treaty, the area south of the Sava and west of the Una valley to the Kapela Mountains were declared as the private domain of the Babonići. The treaty was concluded with the will and consent of pretender Duke Andrew, who arrived to Hungary upon the invitation of the Kőszegis. In accordance with the treaty, the Kőszegis promised that they would not take up arms against the Babonići, even against a royal order, and would not support the Gutkeleds' blood revenge against them.

On the other hand, the Babonići continued to wage conflicts with the Gutkeleds during the summer and autumn of 1278. Ladislaus IV ceremonially reconciled with the Gutkeleds in June 1278, while around the same time, Ottokar II of Bohemia bribed the Babonići to plunder Styria, a realm of his rival Rudolf of Habsburg. Upon the mediation of Palatine Matthew Csák and Timothy, Bishop of Zagreb, along with local clergymen (on behalf of Ladislaus IV), Stephen and Radoslav, also representing their cousins, in addition to their wider kinship, reconciled with the brothers of the late Joachim Gutkeled in Zagreb on 6 November 1278, ending the hostilities (blood feud) between the two families. Despite their reconciliation at Dubica and Zagreb, respectively, the Kőszegis and Gutkeleds continued their struggles against the Babonići throughout 1279 and 1280. Therefore Ladislaus IV sent his representatives to the region and ordered to summon the opponents to Ozalj Castle in October 1280. In accordance with the treaty, the Babonići could keep all the estates that were donations from the king. They were granted the estates in the counties of Podgorje, Gorica, Drežnik, Gaj with Kladuš, Novigrad, and both Pset, and in Petrinja. Radoslav became the guarantor for peace. The chapter of Zagreb drafted the document on 17 November 1280.

=== Individual acquisitions ===
He concluded a protection agreement with the nobles from Donja Jamnica before the Zagreb Chapter in July 1283, i.e. the latter accepted Radoslav and his descendants as their lords, showing his greatest reputation and power in Pset County by that time. In accordance with the agreement, Radoslav acquired some of their lands and income in exchange for his armed protection. In the same year, Radoslav – through his familiares Pousa and James – bought the castle of Lipovec (present-day ruins near Mali Lipovec, Samobor in Croatia) for 150 marks from its builder Ivan, prince of Okić, consolidating the rule of the Babonići in the area around the Samobor–Žumberak mountains. With this purchase, Radoslav also acquired the adjacent lands Plešivica, Braslav, Bregana, Prilep, Rastok and Kulkedfeld. He bought some properties – Ružindol and Toplice – in Podgorje County from the Pribić family in February 1284.

Radoslav successfully managed to politically suppress the Kőszegi family from the area between the Sana and Vrbas rivers (i.e. the area south of the Sava) in the first half of the 1280s, taking advantage of the Kőszegis' conflict with the Diocese of Zagreb. Ladislaus IV appointed Radoslav as župan (comes) of Sana and Vrbas counties, as well as castellan of Glaž by 1285. In that year, Radoslav donated an island called Timpor on the river Una to the Cistercian abbey of Topusko. As the document states, at some unspecified time, and certainly before 1285, the island was seized from the abbey by Radoslav and his late "frater" Denis Péc, and they are now returning it to them after James, abbot of Topusko showed him the royal grant for the said property. He purchased the estate Radcsa from a local noble in 1286, connecting the ancient family estate Vodičevo to the Slavonian borderland until its western border with the Holy Roman Empire. In 1287, Stephen and Radoslav bought the estates of Pedalj and Stupnica (present-day boroughs of Dvor, Croatia) on the southeastern slopes of Zrinska Gora from Matthias and Rathold, sons of the late Roland Rátót. Radoslav is first styled as Ban of Slavonia in March 1288. According to Hungarian historian Jenő Szűcs, he was installed to the position by Ladislaus IV in order to counterbalance the Kőszegis' anti-royal aspirations.

By early 1290, Stephen and Radoslav were considered undisputed lords of Lower Slavonia, when they were among those barons of the realm to whom Pope Nicholas IV sent a letter, in which he informed them that he had appointed papal legate Benvenuto d'Orvieto and requested them to assist his work in order to persuade Ladislaus IV to return to Christianity. The papal letter also mentions their cousins, Nicholas (I) and Stephen (IV) in this respect. Pope Nicholas styled Stephen and Radoslav as bans of Slavonia, but this was only an honorary title, because members of the Kőszegis and Gutkeleds were given the same title simultaneously by the papal curia. At the beginning of the last decade of the 13th century, power in almost all royal counties south of the Sava was in the hands of Stephen and Radoslav. They ruled Gora, Gorica, Novigrad, Gaj, Podgorje, but also in both Pset counties, and in the counties of Vrbas, Sana and Zemljanik. The center of their power became the city of Steničnjak and the area between the rivers Sava, Kupa and Una.

=== Active diplomacy ===
Following the assassination of Ladislaus IV in July 1290, Andrew the Venetian ascended the Hungarian–Croatian throne. Initially, the Babonići were considered supporters of the new monarch. However, Radoslav Babonić, together with Dujam Frankopan, contacted with the Capetian House of Anjou, rivals of Andrew III and contenders to the throne in the summer of 1291. A document from early June in that year preserved that which narrates his journey to the Neapolitan court. According to Croatian historian Hrvoje Kekez, it is possible that Radoslav went to Naples with the aim of connecting with the Angevins, recognizing the danger of the increasingly improving relations between the Kőszegis and the Neapolitan royal family. Consequently, Radoslav was considered a partisan of Mary of Hungary, Queen of Naples, claimant to the Hungarian throne, throughout in 1291. He did not participate in Andrew's campaign against Austria in the summer of 1291, and when the Hungarian king, in the midst of the campaign, sent his faithful noble, comes Grdun (or Gárdony) to Slavonia to defend the borderland, this move was perhaps directed against Radoslav and his Styrian allies. According to the treaty of Hainburg, which was signed on 26 August 1291 concluding the war, Radoslav joined the allegiance of Duke Albert of Austria during the conflict. In accordance with the peace, Andrew III accepted Radoslav and all disloyal nobles back into his good graces.

Thereafter, Radoslav balanced in the political space between the two rival courts. He remained a pillar of the Angevins' claim; when Charles Martel of Anjou bequeathed the Duchy of Slavonia to Stefan Vladislav II in April 1292, the pretender excluded the realms of John and Dujam Frankopan and Radoslav Babonić along with their kinship from that donation. Charles II of Naples confirmed this in August 1292. Since only the name of Radoslav is mentioned among the Babonići, it is plausible that the Neapolitan court recognized him as head of his family despite Stephen's first-born status. In addition, Charles Martel confirmed Radoslav in his all possessions previously granted by the late Ladislaus IV in December 1292. In that year, Radoslav concluded his long-lasting conflict with the Diocese of Zagreb over the estate Hrastovica (today a borough of Petrinja). The judicial court ruled in favor of Radoslav, and he acquired the estate from John, Bishop of Zagreb for 230 marks. He also bought the land Kremenčica for 70 marks in the same year, all the bordering lands of which he already owned.

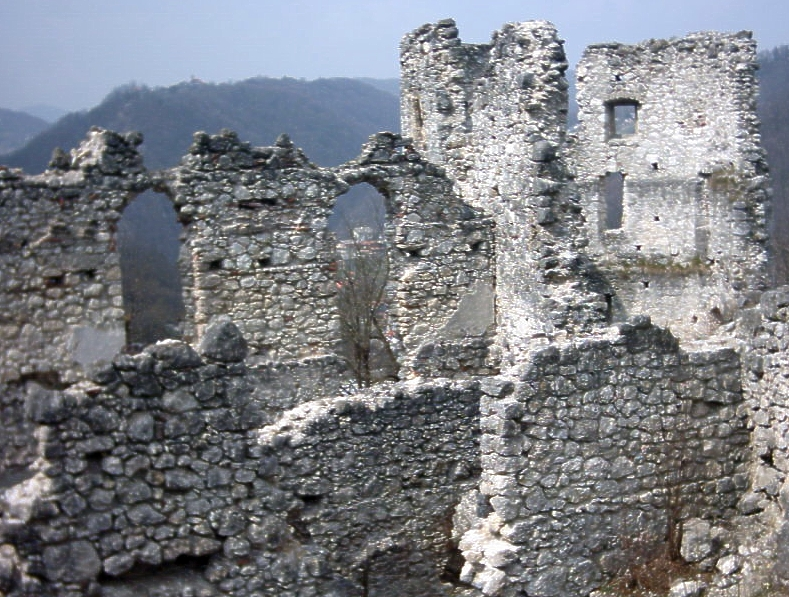
Samobor Castle in Croatia

Meanwhile, Radoslav also rendered important services to Andrew III. The Hungarian monarch sent his confidant Ugrin Csák to Primorje in order to escort his mother Tomasina Morosini to Hungary in 1292, but he was captured and imprisoned by certain "disloyal barons". He was freed from captivity amidst fighting by Radoslav Babonić upon the king's order, and Radoslav also accompanied the queen mother to Zagreb in July 1292, where Andrew III and his royal army joined them after the suppression of the Kőszegis' rebellion. For his merit, Andrew III appointed Radoslav as Ban of Slavonia in the autumn of 1292. In the next year, Hungarian royal charters refer to him as "former" ban, while the Neapolitan court continuously styled him with this dignity. In order to strengthen his loyalty, Andrew III granted Radoslav the fortress of Želin in Zagreb County in June 1293. The castle was located halfway between the crossing over the Kupa river and Zagreb. By taking over Želin, the Babonići gradually began to expand their sphere of interest to the area of the medieval Zagreb County. Prior to September 1293, Andrew III granted the forts Glaž, Okić, Vrbas, Susedgrad and Samobor, in addition to the estates Vinodol, Petrinja and Podgorje. With these donations the Babonići established themselves as the sole masters of the area around the Samobor–Žumberak mountains. Despite Andrew's generosity, Radoslav continued his policy of maneuvering between the two conflicting parties, and therefore maintained his contact with the Kingdom of Naples in 1294. His envoys, the priest Pontius and a certain Ladislaus from Ozalj, were ceremoniously received in Naples in September 1294.

The relationship between Stephen and Radoslav became tense by the first half of the 1290s, which ended with their reconciliation before the Zagreb Chapter on 21 August 1294. Hrvoje Kekez considered that their conflict may have lasted since the early 1280s, as is evident from the fact that the brothers last appeared together at the signing of the peace treaty in Ozalj in 1280. In addition, their political orientation also differed from the 1290s; Stephen remained loyal to Andrew III, while Radoslav pursued an active foreign policy without close commitment. It is possible their conflict of interest was the area along the Vrbas river and the provision on non-occupation of towns may have referred to precisely this border area (Zemljanik and Vrbas parishes). In addition, both of them held the title of ban, claiming the dignity for themselves. Kekez argued their conflict also resulted their different political orientations in the first half of the 1290s. The agreement in 1294 shows that the brothers forgot the harm they had done to each other. They jointly decided that from now on they would love each other as brothers and not fight over each other's heads. It was also agreed that they would not seize fortified cities and that neither side would help the other's enemies in wars. It was jointly decided that they would request the papal confirmation of peace and excommunication for the violator, and that whoever violated the terms of the peace would have to pay a fine of 1,000 marks.

Radoslav was again referred to as Ban of Slavonia in September 1294. Sometime around 1295, he rebelled against Tomasina Morosini, the Duchess of Slavonia, who aimed to strengthen the royal power over the region; as a result she besieged and captured his castle of Orbászkő (ruins near present-day Vrbaška, Bosnia and Herzegovina). Radoslav Babonić died sometime between 1295 and 1299. Although he had multiple sons according to the 1294 treaty with his brother, they predeceased him or died soon after, because his landholdings and wealth were inherited by his cousins in 1299.

== Sources ==
- Báling, Péter (2015). "Personal Network of the Neapolitan Angevins and Hungary (1290–1304)". Specimina nova. Pars prima, Sectio mediaevalis: Dissertationes historicae collectae per Cathedra Historiae Medii Aevi Modernorumque Temporum Universitatis Quinqueecclesiensis. 8. University of Pécs: 83–108. doi:10.15170/SPMNNV.2015.08.06. ISSN 1588-8002.
- Engel, Pál (1996). Magyarország világi archontológiája, 1301–1457, I [Secular Archontology of Hungary, 1301–1457, Volume I] (in Hungarian). História, MTA Történettudományi Intézete. ISBN 963-8312-44-0.
- Kekez, Hrvoje (2011). Plemićki rod Babonića do kraja 14. stoljeća [The Noble Babonići Kindred until the End of the Fourteenth Century] (in Croatian). Doctoral thesis, University of Zagreb.
- Kristó, Gyula (1979). A feudális széttagolódás Magyarországon [Feudal Anarchy in Hungary] (in Hungarian). Akadémiai Kiadó. ISBN 963-05-1595-4.
- Markó, László (2006). A magyar állam főméltóságai Szent Istvántól napjainkig: Életrajzi Lexikon [Great Officers of State in Hungary from King Saint Stephen to Our Days: A Biographical Encyclopedia] (in Hungarian). Helikon Kiadó. ISBN 963-547-085-1.
- Rudolf, Veronika (2023). Közép-Európa a hosszú 13. században [Central Europe in the Long 13th Century] (in Hungarian). Arpadiana XV., Research Centre for the Humanities. ISBN 978-963-416-406-7.
- Szűcs, Jenő (2002). Az utolsó Árpádok [The Last Árpáds] (in Hungarian). Osiris Kiadó. ISBN 963-389-271-6.
- Thallóczy, Lajos (1897). A Blagay-család oklevéltára. Codex diplomaticus comitum de Blagay [The Charters of the Blagay Family] (in Hungarian and Latin). Monumenta Hungariae Historica. Diplomataria 28, Hungarian Academy of Sciences.
- Zsoldos, Attila (2003). "III. András". In Szovák, Kornél; Szentpéteri, József; Szakács, Margit (eds.). Szent István és III. András [Saint Stephen and Andrew III] (in Hungarian). Kossuth Kiadó. pp. 119–227. ISBN 963-09-4461-8.
- Zsoldos, Attila (2011). Magyarország világi archontológiája, 1000–1301 [Secular Archontology of Hungary, 1000–1301] (in Hungarian). História, MTA Történettudományi Intézete. ISBN 978-963-9627-38-3.

Radoslav I House of Babonić Born: ? Died: after 1295
Political offices
| Preceded by Nicholas Kőszegi | Ban of Slavonia; 1288 | Succeeded by Ivan Kőszegi |
| Preceded by Henry Kőszegi | Ban of Slavonia; 1292 | Succeeded by Henry Kőszegi |
| Preceded by Henry Kőszegi | Ban of Slavonia; 1294 | Succeeded by James Borsa |
