= Stephen II Babonić =

Croatian nobleman and ban

Stephen (II) Babonić

Ban of Maritime Provinces
- Reign: 1243–1249
- Predecessor: Ivánka Zsadány
- Successor: Dominic
- Died: after 1256
- Noble family: House of Babonić
- Issue: Stephen III; Radoslav I
- Father: Baboneg I or Stephen I

Stephen (II) Babonić (Croatian: Stjepan II. Babonić; died after 1256) was a Croatian nobleman in the first half of the 13th century, who served as Ban of Maritime Provinces, a precursor office of the Ban of Croatia, from 1243 to 1249. As an early member of the Babonić family, Stephen laid the foundations of its future power in Lower Slavonia.

== Early life ==
Stephen was born into the Babonić family, a powerful kinship in Slavonia. His life is characterized by many uncertainties due to the contradictions of the degrees of kinship within the family and the questionable authenticity of royal charters regarding the early history of his kinship. His father was Baboneg (I) or Stephen (I) – Stephanus de Goricha –, both lived in the late 12th century and early 13th century. He had a brother, Baboneg (II).

According to a forgery, Stephen with a large escort (250 knights) joined the Fifth Crusade in 1217, under the command of Andrew II of Hungary. Thereafter, returning home, the monarch allegedly confirmed the right of ownership over the estate Vodičevo (present-day in Bosnia and Herzegovina) to Baboneg and Stephen in 1218, creating them perpetual counts, exempting them from the jurisdiction of the dukes and bans of Slavonia, the payment of tax marturina and forbidding convening of provincial assemblies (Latin: generalis congregatio) to their lands. However, the royal charter contains several anachronisms, thus majority of the Hungarian – e.g. Gyula Pauler, László Fejérpataky, Lajos Thallóczy and Imre Szentpétery – and Croatian historians – e.g. Nada Klaić and Hrvoje Kekez – did not accept the document as authentic. Nevertheless, Louis I of Hungary confirmed and transcribed the document in 1352, upon the request of Dujam Blagajski, a descendant of the Babonići. Kekez considered that Stephen's participation in the crusade may be true despite the document being forged, because the route of Andrew's journey passed through Slavonia, near to Vodičevo. Returning Slavonia, Stephen and Baboneg erected the Church of the Holy Cross as an endowment in the old Croatian parish of Vodičevo.

On 23 September 1241, Béla IV of Hungary confirmed the right of ownership over Vodičevo to Baboneg and Stephen, upon their request. It is plausible that both of them belonged to the entourage of the king, who fled to Slavonia following the Battle of Mohi during the first Mongol invasion of Hungary. However, another charter with the same date, which again refers to the privileges allegedly received (see above), is a forgery. Nada Klaić argued both the 1218 and 1241 documents were compiled in the mid-14th century, during the lawsuits involved by Dujam Blagajski. In 1242, Béla IV confirmed the privileges of the settlers of Samobor, entrusting Stephen to determine its boundaries, who was specifically appointed by him for this purpose. Utilizing their fruitful relationship with the king, the brothers expanded the political, but probably also economic, sphere of their interest in the vicinity of Gorička (Gorica) and Zrin. Baboneg and Stephen also came into contact with the Cistercians of Topusko Abbey, who were their neighbors from their settlement in the region.

== Ban ==
Stephen Babonić was made Ban of Maritime Provinces (Croatian: Primorje, Hungarian: Tengermellék) in 1242 or 1243. He was styled as "partium maritimarum banus" (Latin) in February 1243, then "bano della maritima" (Italian) in April 1243. In this capacity, Stephen acted as deputy of Denis Türje, the Ban of Slavonia, who aimed to restore royal power over the region upon the order of Béla IV, and Stephen represented the local nobility in this endeavor. In February 1243, Baboneg and Stephen, representing the Babonići, reconciled with the burghers of Senj to put an end to hostilities and mutual blood feuds (vražda). It is possible that they conflict broke out over the collection of income from growing trade along the Dalmatian coast. They also pledged mutual assistance to strengthen peace. The city magistrate donated a palace to Stephen in Senj too. The peace treaty was testified by representatives of the cathedral chapter of Zagreb, the chapter of Topusko, local chapter of the Knights Templar, the nobles of Croatia and the nobles beyond the Gvozd Mountain. Baboneg and Stephen were escorted by some members of the Ratetići, Ladihovići, Koraničanići, Hutinjani and Bonjani families. Lajos Thallóczy argued that they were all related to the Babonići, forming a common genus or clan. Nada Klaić rejected the latter proposal considering they were just allies or familiares of the Babonići. Mladen Ančić emphasized that the document and other charters clearly state the kinship relationship between the six families of Gora (e.g. sex generacionum comitatus de Gorra), and this interpretation is also accepted by historians Hrvoje Kekez and Gábor Szeberényi.

Stephen is next mentioned as ban in April 1243, when Béla IV instructed the citizens of Trogir to assist the operation of Alexander, župan of Klis. The king also ordered Denis Türje, Stephen Babonić and Alexander to protect the privileges of Trogir. Stephen still held the dignity in May 1249, when issued a charter determining the borders of the estate Posedarje. Béla IV confirmed his charter in November 1251. Stephen was succeeded as vice-ban by Dominic around July 1249, who was appointed by Stephen Gutkeled, the new Ban of Slavonia.

== Later life ==
Both Baboneg and Stephen acquired lands in the Banovina region, which laid the foundations of the family's later oligarchic domain. In 1249, Baboneg bought Poljana in Dubica County on the lower reaches of the Sava (present-day in Bosnia and Herzegovina) from Vlkodrug, son of Abraham. Stephen also acquired the estate Bojna (today a borough of Glina, Croatia) under unknown circumstances. The brothers gradually consolidated their position in the valley of river Una, along the important trade road of the time, which connected Slavonia (and Hungary) with Croatia and Dalmatia, and they had already expanded their influence downstream from their ancient estate Vodičevo, towards the confluence of the Una and the Sava, by purchasing Poljana. Béla IV confirmed their right of possession over Vodičevo in March 1256, upon the request of Baboneg and Stephen, amidst a supervision process over the former royal land donations beyond the Drava, conducted by Ban Stephen Gutkeled. In that year, the brothers also possessed the villages Bezdyn and Mekuyn, both settlements were part of the accessories of Dubica Castle prior to that.

Stephen died plausibly in the late 1250s or early 1260s, when his adults sons – Stephen (III) and Radoslav (I) – first appear in contemporary records. The former two made the Babonići as the most powerful family in Slavonia within decades, and themselves were influential barons of the Hungarian–Croatian realm.

== Sources ==
- Gál, Judit (2020). Dalmatia and the Exercise of Royal Authority in the Árpád-Era Kingdom of Hungary. Arpadiana III., Research Centre for the Humanities. ISBN 978-963-416-227-8.
- Kádár, Tamás (2021). "II. András (1188–[1205]–1235), IV. Béla (1214–[1235]–1270) és V. István (1241–[1270]–1272) királyok itineráriuma [The Itineraries of Kings Andrew II (1188–[1205]–1235), Béla IV (1214–[1235]–1270) and Stephen V (1241–[1270]–1272)]". Fons. 28 (3). Szentpétery Imre Történettudományi Alapítvány: 399–465. ISSN 1217-8020.
- Kekez, Hrvoje (2011). Plemićki rod Babonića do kraja 14. stoljeća [The Noble Babonići Kindred until the End of the Fourteenth Century] (in Croatian). Doctoral thesis, University of Zagreb.
- Thallóczy, Lajos (1897). A Blagay-család oklevéltára. Codex diplomaticus comitum de Blagay [The Charters of the Blagay Family] (in Hungarian and Latin). Monumenta Hungariae Historica. Diplomataria 28, Hungarian Academy of Sciences.
- Zsoldos, Attila (2011). Magyarország világi archontológiája, 1000–1301 [Secular Archontology of Hungary, 1000–1301] (in Hungarian). História, MTA Történettudományi Intézete. ISBN 978-963-9627-38-3.

Stephen II House of Babonić Born: ? Died: after 1256
Political offices
Preceded by Ivánka Zsadány	Ban of Maritime Provinces; 1243–1249	Succeeded by Dominic
