= Stephen I Babonić =

Croatian nobleman

Stephen (I) Babonić
- Count of Goricha
- Died: before 1210
- Noble family: House of Orsini (?); House of Babonić
- Spouse: N von Görz (?)
- Issue: Baboneg III; Stephen II (?)
- Father: Nicolotus Orsini (?)

Stephen I Babonić (Croatian: Stjepan I. Babonić; died before 1210) was a Croatian nobleman and soldier at the turn of the 12th and 13th centuries. He was the founder of the illustrious Babonić family in Slavonia. He is referred to as Stephen of Goricha (Latin: Stephanus de Goricha, Croatian: Stjepan od Goričke, Hungarian: Goricai István) by later royal charters, however, the credibility of these is disputed to varying degrees, so there are many uncertainties surrounding his origins and life.

== Béla's alleged donation ==
=== Content ===
The coat-of-arms of Emeric, King of Hungary

Upon the request of Franjo Blagajski, a scion of the Babonići, King Maximilian, in Vienna on 7 November 1571, transcribed an alleged royal charter of Emeric, King of Hungary issued in 1197 or 1200, which contains the ancestry of Stephen and thus the origin of the Babonić family. The document was preserved in the archives of the Blagaj family (also Blagay or Blagajski) in Weißenstein (present-day Boštanj in Slovenia). Later, it was transferred to the Hungarian National Museum.

According to the royal charter, Stephen, as the son of Nicholas (Nicolotus), originated from the Orsini family, residents of the Lateran, who themselves descended from the senatorial class of Ancient Rome. As a result of a feud between the local nobility, Stephen fled to the court of Herman, Count of Gorizia in Carinthia. Thereafter, he married one of the daughters of Herman. The charter narrates that when a certain German nobleman, Albert of Mihovo – whose lands laid along the border near Podgorja and Gorička – broke into Slavonia plundering and looting the region with his troops, causing severe damage and killing and capturing many locals, Stephen entered the service of Béla III of Hungary requesting the king to go to war against Albert. Stephen, together with his followers and kinsmen and the assistance of prince Emeric, Duke of Croatia and Dalmatia, and 12 most powerful lords of the realm sent by Béla, won a victory over the invading army in a long-lasting struggle. Stephen was seriously injured during the clash and a number of his relatives were killed. His army devastated Albert's domain and took many prisoners. As a result, Albert begged the king for forgiveness and peace. For his merits, Béla III granted the land Vodičevo (Wodicha), which laid at the boundaries of Sana and Dubica counties in Lower Slavonia (south of the Sava river; present-day in Bosnia and Herzegovina), to Stephen and his kinship. In addition, Béla also donated his own royal coat-of-arms. However, Béla III fell ill before the donation could be recorded in a deed. On his deathbed, he left his son, Emeric, to carry out his order. Emeric, who ascended the Hungarian throne in 1196, issued a golden bull in which he granted Vodičevo to Stephen and authorized him to use the royal coat-of-arms and banner: a golden-crowned lion with golden claws in a shield and growing as an ornament above the helmet (i.e. crest). According to its closure, the royal charter was drafted by Peter, the royal chancellor and provost of Székesfehérvár in "1200, the first year of our [Emeric's] reign".

=== Authenticity ===
Regarding the Croatian historiography, 17th-century Carniolan historian Johann Ludwig Schönleben accepted the charter's narration and connected the Blagaj kinship to the Orsini (Ursini) family. In 1906, Croatian historian Milan Šufflay expressed doubts about the authenticity of the narration and emphasized that the 16th-century Croatian and Slavonian nobility did not consider their native origins to be sufficiently noble and that they sought a false origin in classical antiquity. Nada Klaić argued this supposed consanguinity is not mentioned before the 17th century, and she declared that document and its entire content as forged. Hrvoje Kekez emphasized that the 1571 document should be viewed in the context of the Renaissance humanist practice of the late medieval and early modern European nobility, which sought to trace its origins as far back as possible, with it being particularly popular to trace its ancestors to one of the Roman patrician families.

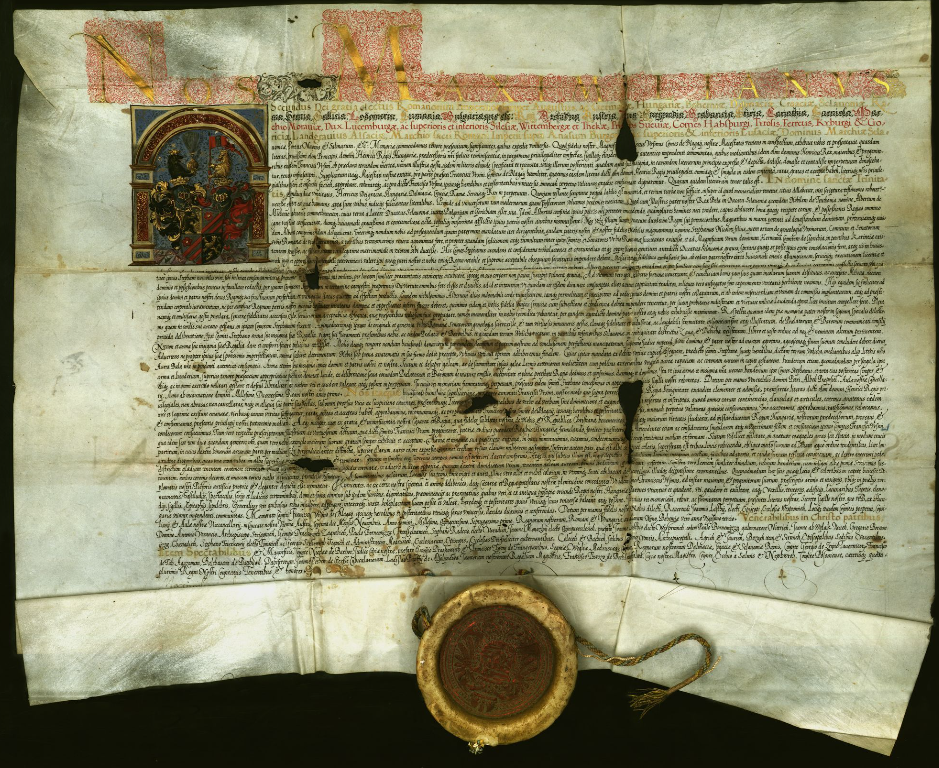
The 1571 charter of King Maximilian

Initially, 19th-century Hungarian (e.g. György Pray, Mihály Horváth and György Fejér) and Italian historians (for instance, Leone Tettoni and Francesco Saladini) accepted the royal charter as authentic. Albert Nyáry was the first scholar who expressed doubts about the authenticity for reasons of content. The heraldist cited anachronistic elements regarding Emeric's coat-of-arms. Family coats-of-arms do not yet appear in contemporary sources, and the crest is also a much later development in Hungarian heraldry, and elsewhere in Europe. In his golden bull issued in 1190, Béla III did not use a coat-of-arms, which indicates that he did not have. In addition, when Stephen allegedly left Rome for Gorizia, Pope Celestine III, a member of the Orsini family ruled the Papal States (in 1191–1198), so the Orsinis were at the height of their power. In fact, this struggle between the Roman families broke out in 1208, as Nyáry claimed, long time after Béla's death. Hungarian historians Gyula Pauler and Lajos Thallóczy considered that Emeric's alleged royal charter is a 16th-century forgery. Due to archontological reasons (e.g. the tenure of Peter as chancellor), Thallóczy accepted 1200 as the alleged year of the charter's issuance, instead of 1197 ("Emeric's first regnal year").

Among modern historians, only heraldic László Szegedi accepts Emeric's aforementioned charter as authentic. Analyzing Nyáry's objections to the content, he claimed the Orsinis did not relate the Bobone family, of which Pope Celestine was a member. Szegedi argued the Babonići descended from the Orsini del Friuli family, also "ancestors" of the Rosenberg family. Szegedi, who considered that it was issued in 1197, rejected the existence of two Emeric charters (an authentic original and a 16th-century forgery), arguing that the Orsini origin story, regardless of its truth content, became a Central European wandering myth early on. Regarding the donation of royal coat-of-arms, there are references to advanced Hungarian heraldry from the 12th–13th centuries, and both Emeric and Andrew adopted their arms from Béla III. The historian concluded that the ruling Árpád dynasty used the lion as their family symbol already in the preheraldic times. Szegedi claimed that Peter, who perhaps is identical with Anonymus, functioned as acting chancellor substituting Katapán, when drafted the document in 1197.

== Subsequent royal confirmations ==
A forgery with the year 1218 narrates that Andrew II of Hungary confirmed the right of ownership over the estate Vodičevo to Stephen's sons, Baboneg and Stephen, creating them perpetual counts, exempting them from the jurisdiction of the dukes and bans of Slavonia, the payment of tax marturina and forbidding convening of provincial assemblies (Latin: generalis congregatio) to their lands. The text also refers to Stephen of Goricha as a descendant of the Orsini family. However, the royal charter contains several anachronisms, thus majority of the Hungarian – e.g. Gyula Pauler, László Fejérpataky, Lajos Thallóczy and Imre Szentpétery – and Croatian historians – e.g. Nada Klaić and Hrvoje Kekez – did not accept the document as authentic. Nevertheless, Louis I of Hungary confirmed and transcribed the document in 1352, upon the request of Dujam Blagajski, a descendant of the Babonići.

On 23 September 1241, Béla IV of Hungary confirmed the right of ownership over Vodičevo to Baboneg and Stephen, upon their request. The text mentions their father Stephen's merits in the war against Albert. However, another charter with the same date, which again refers to the privileges allegedly received in 1218 (see above), is a mid-14th-century forgery. Nada Klaić argued both the 1218 and 1241 documents were compiled in the mid-14th century, during the lawsuits involved by Dujam Blagajski. In 1256, Béla IV again confirmed their right of possession over Vodičevo amidst a supervision process over the former royal land donations beyond the Drava, conducted by Ban Stephen Gutkeled. In 1269, Béla, Duke of Slavonia, after a dispute between Baboneg's sons – James and Christian – and several local castle warriors of Dubica, ruled in favor of the Babonići regarding the ownership of Vodičevo. The text mentions the donation of Béla III and its subsequent confirmations by Emeric (with a golden bull in 1200) and Béla IV (with a golden bull in 1241 and a wax seal in 1256). Both royal charters with golden bull were kept in the Cistercian abbey of Kostanjevica na Krki. Duke Béla's bailiffs traveled there and investigated each documents. The duke's authentic charter transcribed Emeric's charter which contains Stephen's merits against Albert, but it does not mention the donation of the coat-of-arms and Stephen's Italian origin.

=== Interpretations ===
Nada Klaić considered that all four documents (1200, 1218, 1241 and 1256) from the first half and mid-13th century that refer to Stephen of Goricha and his sons Stephen and Baboneg were created in the mid-14th century or later, so their authenticity is questionable, and she rejected their entire content as a forgery, questioning whether a "Stephen of Goricha" even existed.

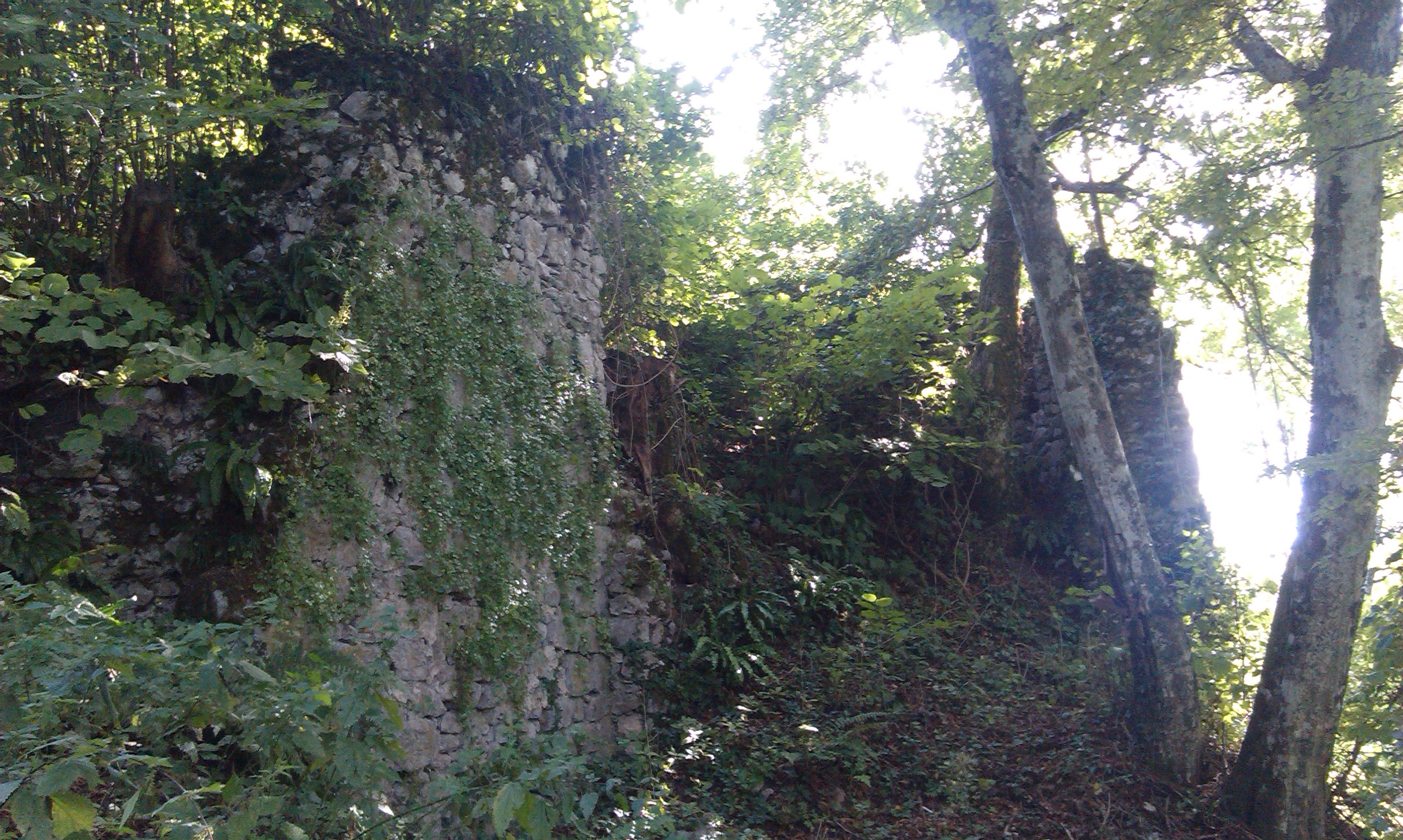
The ruins of the fort Mihovo in Slovenia

Lajos Thallóczy argued that Albert plundered Slavonia from his castle of Mihovo or Meichau in the March of Carniola (present-day Slovenia). He identified the attacker with Berthold, Duke of Merania. Croatian historian Radoslav Lopašić considered that Stephen served as župan of Gorička County, an administrative unit in the western frontier of Slavonia under Hungarian–Croatian suzerainty, when this Albert invaded the territory from his neighboring lands in 1195. Antal Pór – who, after some skepticism, – accepted the 1571 charter as authentic – argued that Goricha refers to the County of Gorizia (Görz) in the Holy Roman Empire which reflects Stephen's marriage and new homeland. and In contrast, Thallóczy identified Goricha with the area of Krško (Gurkfeld), where the Babonići possessed lands too in the late 13th century. Later, the historian considered that their roots laid around the fortress of Steničnjak in the medieval Gorička County. Thallóczy considered that Stephen's marriage with a daughter of a non-existing Herman of Gorizia is a retrospective fabrication of the later relationship between the two families (John Babonić married Clara Euphemia from the Meinhardiner dynasty), and his identification with Herman, Duke of Carinthia cannot be proven. He considered that "Babo" was Stephen's nickname from which his descendants later took their family name. This name was common in Friuli, Istria, Carinthia and Carniola, but not in Slavonia and Croatia, i.e. Thallóczy argued that Stephen was active in the territory of present-day Slovenia. Due to his marriage with an unidentified lady from the Counts of Ortenburg, he acquired lands on the right bank of the river Gurk in Carinthia, in the region between the rivers Gurk and Kupa. The historian considered the alleged roots with the Orsinis were invented in the mid-14th century (the forged charter of Andrew II from 1218), when the Blagajskis took part in the Neapolitan campaigns of Louis the Great. The details (e.g. Stephen's departure from Rome and his marriage) were created by the author of the 16th-century forgery (Emeric's alleged charter from 1197 or 1200). Based on a 1243 charter issued by his sons, Thallóczy argued that Stephen's family formed a common genus or clan with the Ratetići, Ladihovići, Koraničanići, Hutinjani and Bonjani families. Nada Klaić rejected the latter proposal considering they were just allies or familiares of the Babonići. Mladen Ančić emphasized that the document and other charters clearly state the kinship relationship between the six families of Gora County (e.g. sex generacionum comitatus de Gorra), and this interpretation is also accepted by historians Hrvoje Kekez and Gábor Szeberényi.

Based on the aforementioned 1243 charter, Hrvoje Kekez agreed that Stephen and the Babonići originated from the area of Gora County. He identified Goricha with the village Gorička (present-day a borough of Dvor, Croatia) and claimed that the family came from the nearby land surrounded by the forts Osječenica (today in Bosnia and Herzegovina) and Zrin. Stephen's ancient lands located near the most important medieval road that led through Gora County from the valley of river Una to the river Kupa. Kekez argued that Stephen built the fort of Gorička at the centre of his estates, and royal charters reflect this instead of the county Gorica or Gorička, which located in other part of Slavonia. Slovenian historian Miha Kosi identified the German nobleman who invaded Slavonia with Count Albert von Weichselberg (or Albert of Višnja Gora), and placed the conflict itself in the last years of the reign of Béla III. This Albert constantly plundered the region towards from White Carniola. During the Brothers' Quarrel, Stephen entered the service of Duke Andrew, the future king of Hungary. Therefore, Stephen was granted Vodičevo only in 1200, after the first reconciliation between Emeric and Andrew.

== Later life ==
Sometime after Emeric's grant, Stephen donated portions in Vodičevo to the Knights Templar, who were active in the region. When Andrew II confirmed this donation to the chivalric order, among grants from other noblemen, in 1210, the monarch referred to Stephen as a deceased person ("Stephanus bone memorie comes de Goriza").

Stephen and his wife had two sons, Baboneg and Stephen. He had a brother Baboneg (I), who also produced two sons with the same name, Stephen and Baboneg, as Hrvoje Kekez proposed. Whether Stephen, the Ban of Maritime Provinces in the 1240s, is the son of Stephen (I) or Baboneg (I) is uncertain. Nevertheless, future members of the Babonići (including the Blagaj family) descended from the latter.

== Sources ==
- Kekez, Hrvoje (2011). Plemićki rod Babonića do kraja 14. stoljeća [The Noble Babonići Kindred until the End of the Fourteenth Century] (in Croatian). Doctoral thesis, University of Zagreb.
- Szegedi, László (2021). "Imre király hamisnak vélt 1197-es okleveléről [A study on a 1197 charter of King Imre, believed to be forged]". Kárpát-haza Szemle (in Hungarian). 2 (1–2). Nemzetstratégiai Kutatóintézet: 23–58. ISSN 2732-1789.
- Thallóczy, Lajos (1897). A Blagay-család oklevéltára. Codex diplomaticus comitum de Blagay [The Charters of the Blagay Family] (in Hungarian and Latin). Monumenta Hungariae Historica. Diplomataria 28, Hungarian Academy of Sciences.
