= John Babonić =

Croatian nobleman and military leader

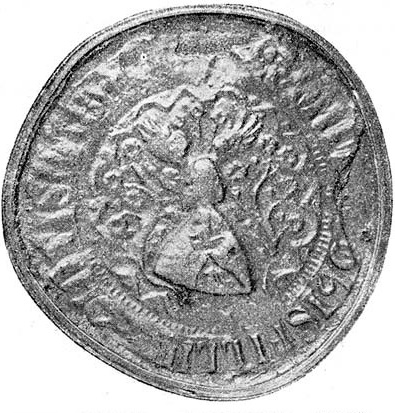
- Seal of John Babonić, 1316

Ban of Slavonia
- Reign: 1316–1322
- Predecessor: Stephen Babonić
- Successor: Nicholas Felsőlendvai
- Died: c. 25 July 1334
- Noble family: House of Babonić
- Spouse: Clara Euphemia von Görz
- Issue: a daughter John II (adopted)
- Father: Baboneg II

John Babonić (Croatian: Ivan Babonić, Hungarian: Babonics János; died c. 25 July 1334) was an influential Croatian baron and military leader at the turn of the 13th and 14th centuries, who served as Ban of Slavonia from 1316 to 1322, briefly also Ban of Croatia and Dalmatia in 1322.

He was a member of the powerful Babonić family which ruled Lower Slavonia since the 1270s, establishing an oligarchic domain there. As a kinsman of the Counts of Gorizia and Tyrol, he participated in various military campaigns to the Patriarchate of Aquileia. Following the death of his brother in 1316, he was eleveated into Ban of Slavonia, inheriting his province. As a royal baron of Charles I of Hungary, he fought against the Kőszegi family in Upper Slavonia and crushed the power of the Šubić family in Croatia and Dalmatia. He was dismissed as ban in late 1322, and the Babonići gradually lost power and influence in the region thereafter. After 1326, John acquired lands in Hungary.

== Early life ==
John (I) was born into the Krupa branch of the powerful Babonić family, as the son of Baboneg or Babonjeg (II). His brothers were Nicholas (I), Stephen (IV), Otto and Radoslav (II) – the latter was the progenitor of the Blagaj family, including its cadet branch, the Counts of Ursini de Blagay.

John, as the third son of Baboneg, was presumably born sometime in the late 1250s or early 1260s. It is plausible that he was still minor in 1278, when only his two older brothers – Nicholas and Stephen – were named in the mediation treaty between the Babonići and Gutkeleds after their series of clashes in Slavonia. His name first appears in contemporary records in 1284, when Jazen (I), Senk and Isan (II), members of the gens (clan) Rata sold their land Pelava along the stream Buzeta for 12 silver marks to John and his brothers, before the Chapter of Zagreb. In the central Banovina region, the Babonić brothers already purchased the hereditary estates of Kresnić, Bojna and Buzeta from the clan Rata prior to that. Since John's youth, the Babonići was the most influential family in Slavonia; their landholdings situated from the river Vrbas in the east to the river Kupa and the border with the Holy Roman Empire in the west, and, to the south, to the slopes of the Kapela Mountains.

Three contemporary northern Italian chronicles and works – "Fragmenta chronici Forojuliensis auctore Juliano canonico Cividatensi", "De gestis Italicorum, liber III." and "Vitae patriaricharum Aquileiensium" – refer to John Babonić as the brother-in-law of Henry III, Count of Gorizia. According to Hungarian historian Lajos Thallóczy, John married Clara Euphemia, the daughter of Albert I of Gorizia; formerly, in 1286, she was betrothed to pretender and future King Andrew III of Hungary, but the wedding ultimately did not take place. John and Clara Euphemia had an unidentified daughter, who married Hungarian noble Peter Herceg, a scion of the Kőszegi family.

== During the Interregnum ==
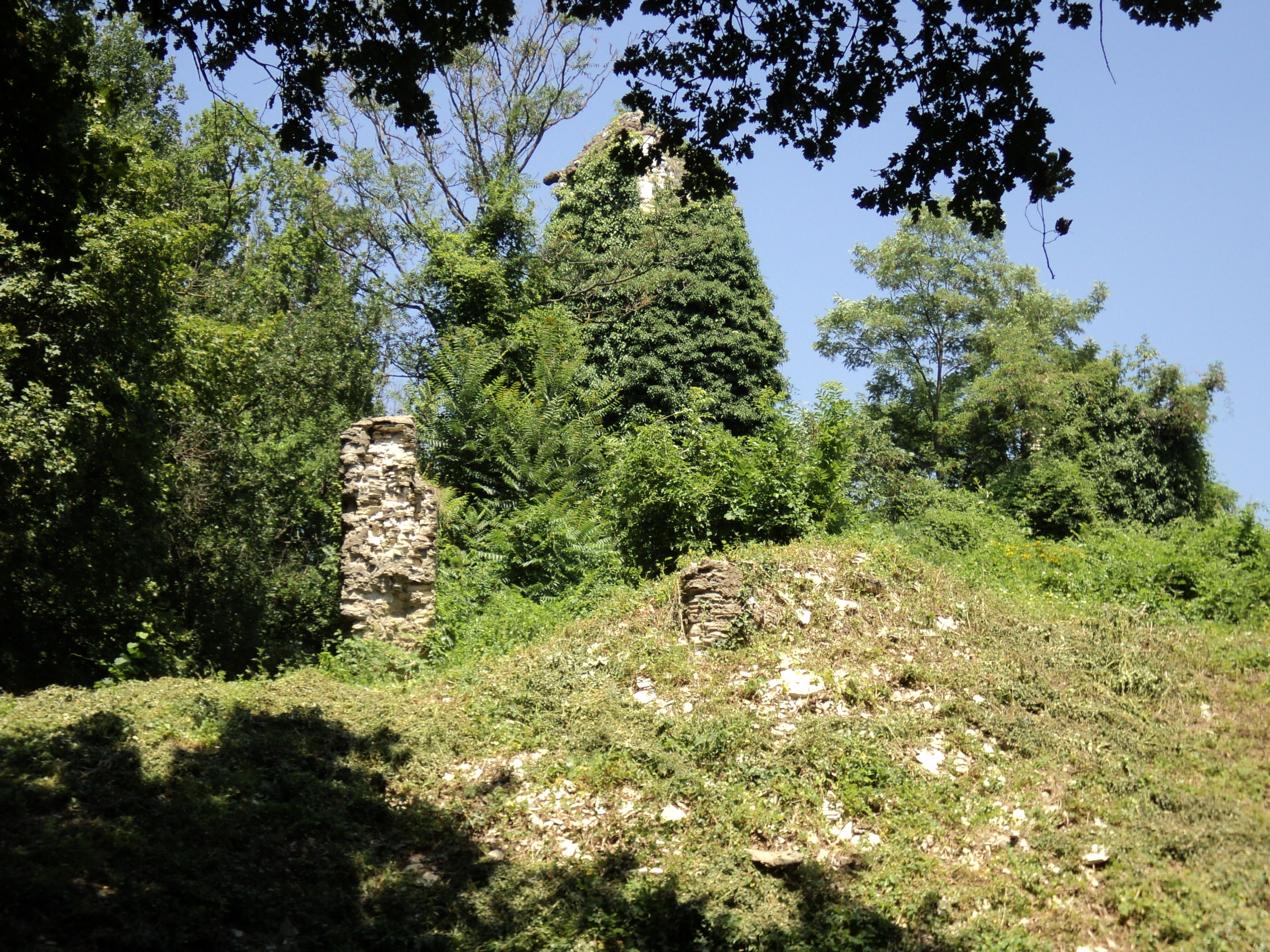
The ruins of Susedgrad

In the 1290s, the Babonići and other leading Croatian and Slavonian noble families balanced between Andrew III and his rivals, the Capetian House of Anjou's claim for the Hungarian–Croatian throne. By the second half of the decade, when their cousins Stephen (III) and Radoslav (I) died, John's elder brother, Stephen (IV) became head of the family. In 1299 and 1300, John and his brothers sent their envoys to the Kingdom of Naples to negotiate with Charles II of Anjou. Meanwhile, they also swore loyalty to Andrew III in the same years, who confirmed their inherited and acquired possessions in August 1299. The king retook the castles Susedgrad, Vrbas and Glaž, but he allowed them to inherit the forts and other possessions of the late Radoslav (I), who died without male heirs. Andrew III expected the Babonići to be important defenders of the border, as these castles were adjacent to the territory of Hrvatin Stjepanić, who supported the Angevin claim to the throne. In September 1299, Charles II and Mary confirmed all rights and possessions, in addition to the hereditary title Ban of Slavonia to the four Babonić brothers – Stephen (IV), John (I), Otto and Radoslav (II) – too. In May 1300, Stephen and his brothers – including John – moved to Zagreb to reconcile with Michael Bő, the Bishop of Zagreb, who was forced to hand over much of his authority and jurisdiction to the Babonić family and a mutual assistance agreement has been concluded between them. The bishop was also persuaded to pledge Medvedgrad to Stephen and John. Albertino Morosini, Duke of Slavonia confirmed the agreement between the king and the Babonići in June 1300.

Following the death of Andrew III and the extinction of the Árpád dynasty in January 1301, a decade-long interregnum began in Hungary and Croatia. Although the Babonići supported Charles of Anjou against his rivals (Wenceslaus then Otto), the family had almost no contact with the Angevins in those years, since the conflicts of the era took place primarily in Western and Northern Hungary, i.e. far from the Babonić province. In that period, Henry Kőszegi was styled as Ban of Slavonia, despite the earlier grant to the Babonići by Charles II of Naples (the grandfather of the Hungarian pretender). In June 1307, Stephen, John and Radoslav ruled in a lawsuit in favor of the abbot of the Cistercian monastery of St. James in Zagreb. Since the document was drawn up in Steničnjak, the main Babonić stronghold, it can be concluded that the brothers were residing there in mid-1307.

By 1308, Charles I became the sole monarch of the Hungarian–Croatian kingdom, but he ruled only a tiny part of his realm due to the co-existence of oligarchic domains, where powerful lords and families – for instance, the Babonići – administered their provinces de facto independently of the royal power. Due to Charles' little interests and presence in Slavonia and Croatia, the Babonići attempted to find new powerful protectors. Because of John's marriage, they were related to their western neighbors, the House of Gorizia, who ruled Gorizia (Görz) and Tyrol within the Holy Roman Empire. Through them, the Babonići were trying to build an alliance with the House of Habsburg. According to chronicler John of Viktring, under their service, John Babonić and his brother-in-law Henry III plundered the Duchy of Carniola, seizing the estates of Henry of Bohemia in the region in 1307. In the early spring 1308, John Babonić traveled to Marburg (Maribor) to meet with Frederick the Fair. During the negotiations took place in March, John lent 300 Viennese silver denarii to the duke to finance his military campaigns. In return, Frederick pledged several villages in Austria along its border with Hungary to John and his brothers. The Steirische Reimchronik narrates that his brothers and Dujam Frankopan escorted him and they promised to join a campaign against Bohemia the following year. Thereafter, in the summer of 1308, John joined Frederick's campaign into the Patriarchate of Aquileia, under the commandment of Ulrich I of Walsee. John's troops besieged and captured Windischgrätz (Slovenj Gradec) in July. He returned to Steničnjak by mid-August 1308.

Arms of the House of Gorizia

After Henry III and Albert II, counts of Gorizia and Tyrol reconciled with Otto III, Duke of Carinthia (also a brother of Henry of Bohemia) in July 1308, the House of Gorizia and the Babonić family became estranged from each other, since the latter supported the Habsburgs against Henry in the struggle for the Bohemian Crown. In order to improve and deepen relations with his brothers-in-law, John ceded hereditary rights to some estates – on the left bank of the Krka river in Carniola – to them on 16 August 1308. Although they were not mentioned by name in the document, it was still said that these estates were located in the territory of the County of Gorizia. Hrvoje Kekez considered that John called these lands "hereditary" because his late father-in-law, Albert I of Gorizia, adopted him as his son. Therefore, he gave up the rights to the estates without receiving anything in return. John was certainly aware that it would be difficult for him to acquire property in Gorizia and Tyrol, because his two brothers-in-law, Henry III and Albert II, were still alive at the time, and they would certainly oppose it. Soon, John was summoned to Zagreb to meet the arriving papal legate Gentile Portino da Montefiore who hurried to Buda to crown Charles I. There, a dispute arose over the possession right of Medvedgrad arose between Stephen (IV) Babonić and Augustin Kažotić, the Bishop of Zagreb. The legate ruled in favor of Stephen. John appears in the document as a witness. The Babonići did not attend the Diet of Hungary in Pest, where Charles I was unanimously proclaimed king on 27 November 1308. The Babonić brothers were not present personally at the second coronation of Charles on 15 June 1309 too; they sent their envoy Peter, the archdeacon of Čazma, only.

In mid-1309, John waged war in Friuli against Patriarch Ottobuono di Razzi on behalf of his brother-in-law Henry III. Apparently as a preparation for the military campaign, John asked the Venetian Senate to return the money he had previously handed over there for safekeeping. A note from Venice has been preserved as a response to a letter sent by John on 7 March 1309 from Zrin. The letter stated John's total claim of 120 marks. During the campaign, John's troops besieged, captured and ransacked Mortegliano on 15 May 1309. Thereafter, Ottobuono di Razzi was forced to retreat as far as Piacenza. John returned to Steničnjak by the end of summer 1309. He and his brothers (Stephen and Radoslav) were summoned to Central Hungary – Lórév, Csepel Island – where they met Charles I, who ordered to protect the rights of the bishop of Zagreb to some estates south of that city. In the next year, John returned to Friuli. By that time, the alliance between Henry III and Rizzardo IV da Camino, the lord of Treviso, had broken, and the former forged alliance with his former enemy Ottobuono. John Babonić arrived to Friuli with an army of 600 soldiers in May 1310, aiding his brother-in-law. Having crossed the Tagliamento river, they attacked the fortress of Sacile, where Rizzardo de Camino had taken refuge. The next day, 13 May, John provided assistance to Henry in the battles against Rizzardo, defeating his army at Cussignacco near Udine. Pursuing Rizzardo, the combined forces attempted to cross the Livenza, but failed, thus they turned towards the town of Valvasone, where their troops committed many atrocities. Rizzardo was defeated at the end of June 1310. Following the victory, John Babonić stayed in the region for a while. He was present in Udine on 10 July 1310, when a delegation of German king Henry VII was welcomed by Henry III and Ottobuono, and John is mentioned as a member of their entourage.

== Royal service ==
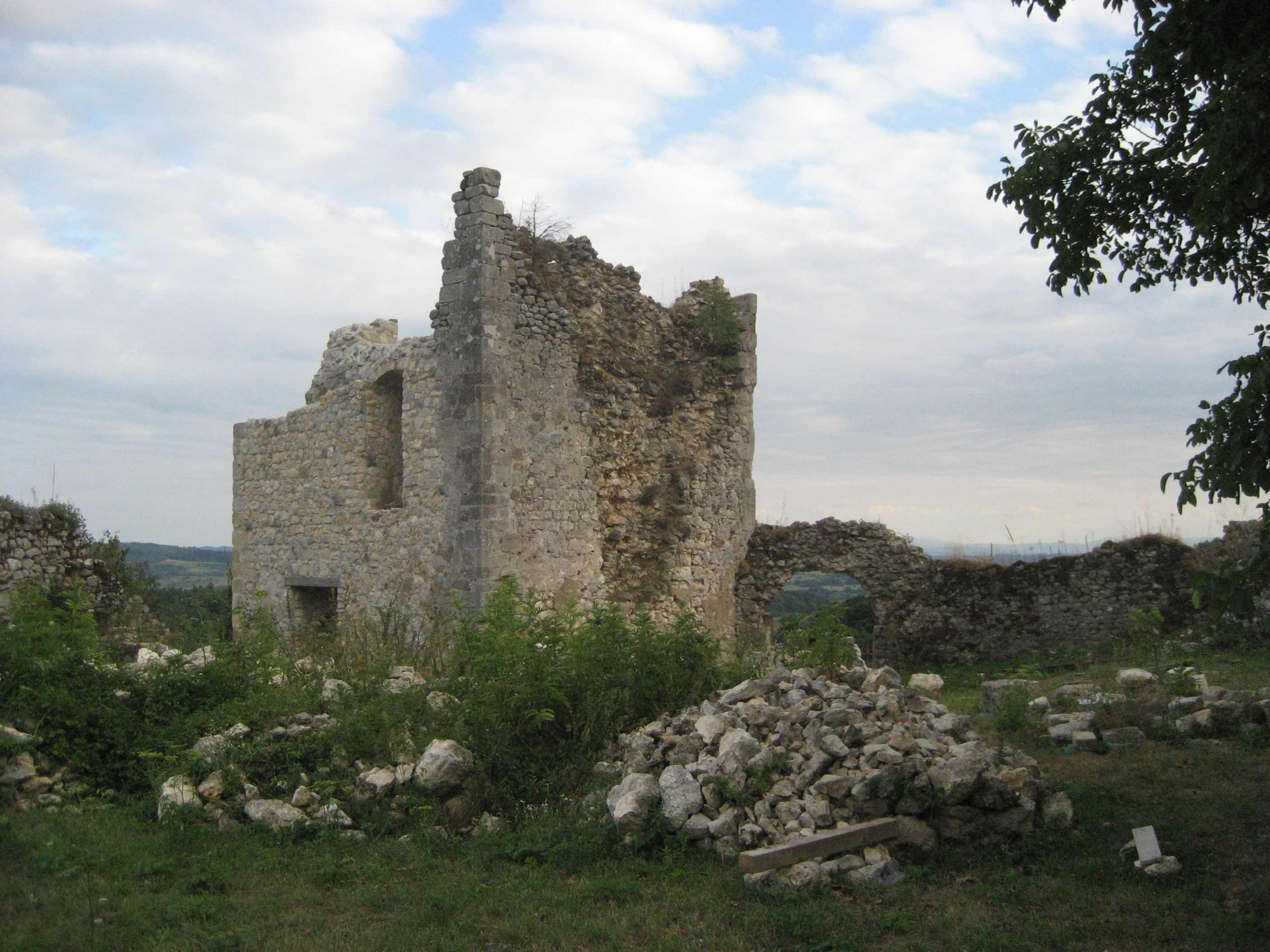
Zrin Castle was John's stronghold until its pledging in 1328

Following his second campaign into Friuli, John Babonić returned to Slavonia. Along with his brothers Stephen and Radoslav, he appeared at the Hungarian royal court in Székesfehérvár in August 1310, when Charles I appointed Stephen as Ban of Slavonia, and ordered him to protect the rights of the citizens of Zagreb on the nearby estate named Kobile, thus the power of the Babonići over Lower Slavonia was granted royal approval. The Babonić brothers personally participated in the third and valid coronation of Charles I on 27 August 1310.

In June 1313, the three brothers undertook a journey with large entourages each of them to the Cistercian abbey of Topusko, where, before Bishop Augustin Kažotić, decided to divide their inherited possessions between each other. Stephen was granted the whole income Chamber of Zagreb, while the income from the ports, accessories and the thirtieth was shared between them. They allowed the widow of the late Radoslav (I) to receive usufruct rights to her husband's estates for the rest of her life. Thereafter, John embarked on his third and final campaign to Friuli, to assist Henry III in a renewed conflict against Patriarch Ottobuono di Razzi. In October 1313, John, with his Slavonian auxiliary troops, besieged Tolmin, then – crossing the river and devastating the surrounding lands – the city of Udine and engaged in the plundering and burning of villages around the city for several days. In November, Henry and Ottobuono concluded a peace. After dissatisfaction, John initiated a second division agreement between the Babonići which was concluded on 12 May 1314. Accordingly, John was granted the customs in Lower Slavonia (including the thirtieth in Dubica County), in addition to the lands in Vrbas County were awarded to John and the castle of Vrbas (also Orbász; present-day Bosnia and Herzegovina) became his new residence. The fort of Glaž (also in Bosnia) also belonged to John after the division treaties. In addition, the document sought to settle the debts that John had incurred for his foreign military expeditions.

=== Ban of Slavonia ===
Stephen (IV) Babonić died sometime after March 1316. Inheriting his political power and administration over the large-scale domain, John Babonić was made Ban of Slavonia thereafter, plausibly already in that year. He first appears in this dignity in May 1317. The Croatian historiography incorrectly dates Charles' royal charter which contains John's merits (see below) to 20 December 1316. In this capacity, John was responsible for the elimination of the remaining Kőszegi power in Slavonia, after a royal campaign expelled them from Southern Transdanubia. John and Peter Kőszegi (later known as Herceg, John Babonić's future son-in-law) entered alliance with the sons of the late Stephen (IV) Babonić at the end of 1316. Their anti-Charles league, which directed against the newly appointed Ban John Babonić, was also supported by a local powerful lord, Peter Monoszló. Charles I, who managed three other campaigns against the oligarchs at the same time, sent his army, led by Demetrius Nekcsei, Paul Garai and Stephen Máréi, against the insurgents in June 1317. John Babonić launched a counterattack too; he defeated the Kőszegis in two battles and also captured several castles, including Orahovica (Raholca), Moslavina (Monoszló), Plošćica (Polosnica), Bršljanac (Berstyanóc), Međurača (Megyericse) and Zdenci (Izdenc) by the end of the year; in the latter place, he was seriously injured by arrows in the legs and hands. Stephen Máréi was also present at the sieges of Moslavina and Zdenci. Charles I issued his royal charter on 20 December 1317, rewarding John Babonić. He was granted the castle of Moslavina, as well as the fortress of Bršljanac, the villages of Gornja Garešnica and Donja Gračenica, as well as the castle and estate of Plošćica in Garić County, and the fortress and estate of Međurača. Upon John's request, his notary and castle warrior Mark Lomnicai was granted the status of Hungarian nobility for his bravery and service during the campaign on the same day. John Babonić received all the castles that the royal armies had captured from the Kőszegis that year, which was unusual method of Charles's consolidation process in a region.

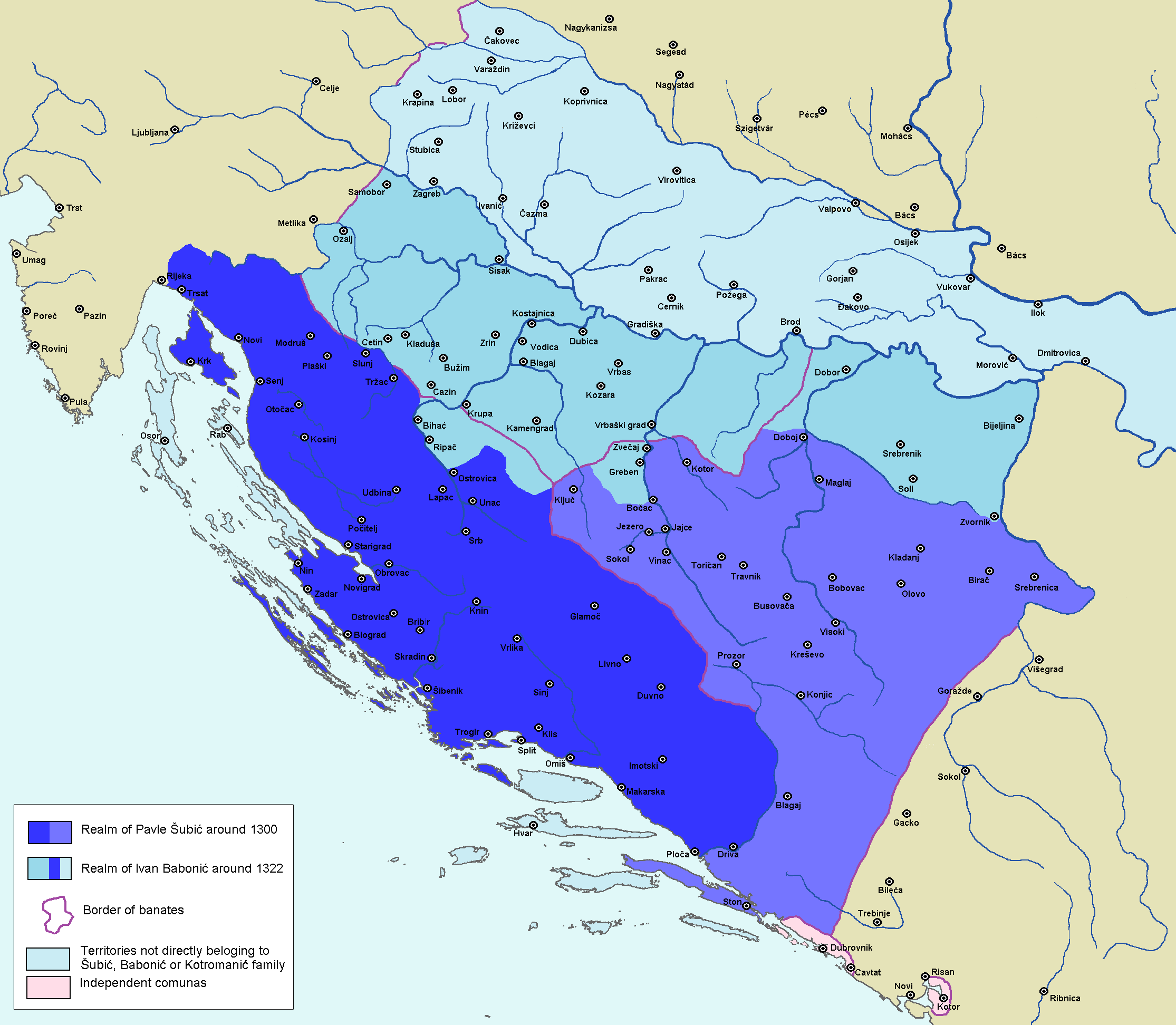
The dominion of John Babonić (cyan) around 1322

With the defeat of the Kőszegis, the fighting has not ended in Slavonia in the following years. Međurača was recaptured by the Kőszegis from John Babonić in 1318 and 1319. The royal troops besieged it but their general Paul Szécsi was killed. Withdrawing to the northwestern portions of Slavonia in early 1320, John Kőszegi was able to retain his lands and forts only in Varaždin County and Zagorje, where from his father, Henry Kőszegi extended his power over the decades. In January 1319, John Babonić was present in Visegrád, where his two retainers, brothers John and George were granted nobility, because of their participation in the war against the Kőszegi family. Some minor hostilities still characterized the local political sphere, for instance, between Nicholas Ludbregi and Hector Gárdony. The latter, a familiaris of John Babonić frequently raided the lands of the Diocese of Zagreb.

Under John Babonić, the province of Slavonia was politically unified, when its partition into two oligarchical blocs (Kőszegis and Babonići) abolished after half a century. The Slavonian nobility began to appear as a collective political body (universitas) and the provincial general assembly (congregatio generalis) was an important element of John's governance who aimed to restore royal power over the region but also to maintain his family's informal power and network. The first known general assembly in Slavonia since 1280 was summoned by John to Zagreb in August 1321. John's frequent personal presence in the royal court reflects the fact that – unlike his older brother or the Kőszegis – had to abandon the strategy of neutrality in order to maintain his oligarchic power. Charles I commissioned John to investigate a conflict between the burghers of Zagreb and the local chapter, who complained that the former unilaterally and unlawfully imposed custom to the institution in 1321. During the general assembly held in August in that year, the ban ruled in favor of the cathedral chapter, but the citizens disputed his authority, citing their privilege (namely, they could only be sued in the king's court). John Babonić and the Slavonian nobility reserved the right for himself, arguing that the position of ban was "the most distinguished dignity in the Kingdom of Hungary". In return, the burghers requested to confirm their privileges from Charles I who visited Zagreb in October 1322.

His rule as ban required a network of his familiares in almost all the counties of Slavonia in which he had possessions. He rewarded their loyalty several times; for instance, Nicholas from Rakovec and other lords were granted the right to collect marturina in their respected domains, and to collect customs on the bridges of the main road leading through Križevci to Zagreb by John in September 1320, by invoking royal jurisdiction. In addition to his loyal men, the sons of John's late brothers – Stephen (IV) and Radoslav (II) – began to appear in contemporary sources in these years. Since John had no surviving sons, he adopted his godson and nephew John (II), making him his heir in May 1321. As ban, John maintained good relations with the Republic of Venice. In January 1317, he sent a letter from Zadar stating that Venetian merchants could trade freely in the areas where his ban's authority extended, as well as in the areas held by his friends, and he handed them a charter as a guarantee of safe trade. However, for this service the ban received 1,060 marks from the Venetian doge Giovanni Soranzo. There was an occasion when John Babonić lent money to the Doge of Venice.

After the elimination of the Kőszegis' power, John Babonić accompanied his king Charles on his several military campaigns against the oligarchs. He was involved in the campaign which the monarch launched against the rebellious sons of Ladislaus Kán in the spring of 1321. John's presence is mentioned by a royal charter issued in the royal camp stationed near Temesvár (present-day Timișoara, Romania) and plausibly commanded the Slavonian knights during the war. John's most glorious victory has arrived in spring 1322, when led a royal army across the mountains to Croatia and Dalmatia against Mladen II Šubić of Bribir, who faced large-scale rebellions in his realm. Many of John's nephews were involved in the campaign. The first battle took place in the vicinity of Šibenik, in which Mladen's troops were defeated, forcing him to withdraw to the south. The armies of Trogir, Šibenik and Venice pillaged the city of Skradin. The second and final battle occurred in Blizna near Klis Fortress. Mladen's army consisted of his own troops, those of his brother George II, as well as Vlachs' and those from lesser nobility of the Poljica region. The opposing army were royal troops under John Babonić in coalition with the Croatian nobility (including Paul II Šubić), the militia of Trogir and Šibenik and the Bosnian troops led by Stephen II, Ban of Bosnia. The battle resulted in the victory for the coalition, forcing Mladen further south into Klis Fortress. Charles I personally arrived the region with his army in September 1322, and after negotiations, he captured and imprisoned Mladen. Both Charles I and John Babonić stayed in Zagreb in October 1322. While maintaining his office in Slavonia, the monarch appointed him as Ban of Croatia and Dalmatia in that month, ending the hereditary banship of the Šubić family. However, Hungarian suzerainty over Croatia remained nominal, and the powerful Croatian nobles – primarily Ivan Nelipić – acted independently of the monarch.

=== Downfall ===
Charles I decided to replace John Babonić with Nicholas Felsőlendvai as Ban of Slavonia in late 1322 or early 1323. Felsőlendvai first appears in the dignity in February 1323. Hungarian historian Attila Zsoldos argued the replacement occurred when Charles I stayed in Zagreb in October 1322. The reason for his decision is uncertain. 19th-century Hungarian historian Antal Pór considered John was perhaps not decisive enough to "settle South Slavic affairs", while Lajos Thallóczy argued the Croatian nobles resented the fact that a lord from Slavonia be their superior. Gyula Kristó argued John Babonić was the "last oligarch", and by the end of 1322 Charles saw the time had come to end his power. Attila Zsoldos considered John Babonić did not fall out of favor with the king, since he held a courtly position until his death thereafter. However, he – since his sons had died by then – adopted his nephew John (II) as his son without the king's approval in 1321, which was contrary to Charles's policy (automatic inheritance of vast wealth, i.e. oligarchic power).

Croatian historian Vjekoslav Klaić claimed that Felsőlendvai was appointed ban in 1322 and he jointly held the dignity with John Babonić for a year, but this assumption is based on two misdated royal charters. Antun Nekić argued that John Babonić was a "symbol of the preceding period; an oligarch who did not owe his position to Charles I in any way", while Felsőlendvai rose to the elite due to his loyalty and service during Charles' war against the oligarchs, he – and his successor Mikcs Ákos – were "creatures" of Charles I, belonging the king's "new aristocracy". Hrvoje Kekez argued that Charles' main goal was to subdue the powerful noble magnates, thus after the victory over the Šubići, he decided to deal with the Babonići, the most powerful noble family in medieval Slavonia at that time.

Micha Madius de Barbazanis, a contemporary chronicler and a nobleman from Split (Spalato), narrates that John Babonić rebelled against the king (or protested against his removal) and subsequently even an armed clash occurred with the troops of Felsőlendvai upon the latter's arrival to Slavonia in May 1323. The Babonić troops, commanded by John (II), attempted to prevent the army of Felsőlendvai, consisted of Hungarians and Cumans, from crossing the Drava. However, the royal army crushed the resistance, capturing numerous soldiers and 400 horses. Vjekoslav Klaić assumed that the conflicts must have taken place somewhere around Steničnjak or Zrin, the latter was John's stronghold. Following the clash, Felsőlendvai accepted his predecessor's surrender and granted mercy to him on behalf of the king.

== Later life ==
Initially, John Babonić refused to acknowledge Felsőlendvai's legitimacy and he continued to call himself the ban of all Slavonia in November 1323, and also in April 1324. Fearing lost his possessions beside his dignity, John contacted Philip of Taranto, the uncle of the Hungarian monarch, who was Lord of Albania and Durrës (Durazzo), in May 1324 with a request his confirm to him and his relatives all the fortresses, estates and feudal goods that rightfully belonged to them. In addition, John most likely hoped that Philip could influence his nephew to leave the Babonić estates in their hands, and perhaps even return John to the dignity of ban. Although Philip fulfilled his request, it was still a mere formal act that had no practical consequences (Charles I even had a difficult relationship with his uncles).

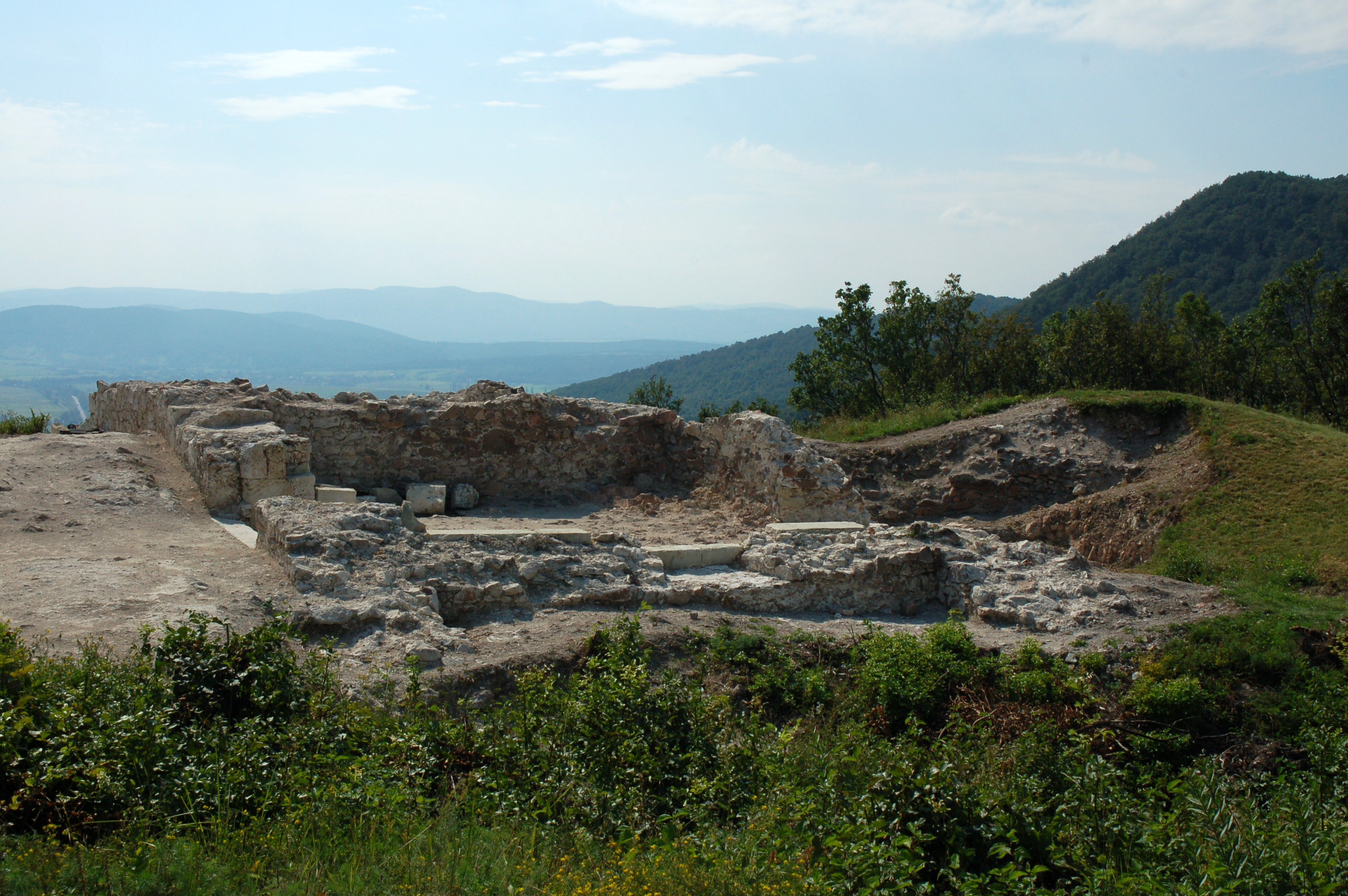
The ruins of Patak Castle near Sátoraljaújhely in Hungary, seat of John Babonić from 1326 until his death

John's fears were not unfounded. From 1323 onwards, Charles began to confiscate the lands and castles of his nephews – thus from his adopted son, John (II) too. Meanwhile, Nicholas Felsőlendvai, who died in 1325, was succeeded by Mikcs Ákos, who began his administration with the primary goal of restoring the power of the ban's post, which was not possible without strengthening the royal influence in all parts of Slavonia. To avoid this fate, John Babonić decided to reconcile with Charles I, who thus appointed him Treasurer of the Queen's Court in 1326. He held the position until 1333. This was the most prestigious dignity in the court of Queen Elizabeth. According to their agreement, John handed over his forts, Bršljanac, Moslavina, Vrbas and Okić in Slavonia to the king, in exchange for the castle of Patak in Northeast Hungary (today ruins near Sátoraljaújhely). John Babonić also lost the fort Hrastovica (today a borough of Petrinja) in favor of the Diocese of Zagreb in 1326. Beside his court position, John was also referred to as castellan of Patak in 1327. When his nephews (the sons of Stephen), in alliance with the Kőszegis, rebelled against the king in 1327, John and the sons of Radoslav (II) – Nicholas (II) and Dujam – did not join them. It is plausible that Peter Kőszegi married John's unidentified daughter for the purpose of sanctifying the conclusion of the covenant between the two families. Royal generals Mikcs Ákos and Alexander Köcski crushed their rebellion within months. Amidst the long-lasting siege of Steničnjak, Mikcs came to terms with the rebels. In exchange for their aforementioned stronghold, he promised to return Moslavina for them. Both Bršljanac and Moslavina were later transferred to Bishop Ladislaus Kórógyi and his nephews prior to 1333. John Babonić, who found himself in financial difficulties, traveled to Székesfehérvár in late autumn 1328 to pledge his castle Zrin and its accessories (numerous surrounding villages) to Lawrence "the Tót", the forefather of the Orahovički (Raholcai) then Iločki (Újlaki) family. Before the purchase, John was the guarantor of his son-in-law, Peter Kőszegi for a total of 250 marks of Viennese denari, which he had borrowed on three occasions from Lawrence and his brothers. Since John apparently did not repay the debt to his brothers within the stipulated time, Lawrence asked the king to take over Zrin in return for the debt. Charles I confirmed the transaction in Visegrád in November 1328. Beside his possession Patak, John functioned as castellan of the royal castle of Revistye, Bars County (present-day Revište, Slovakia) in 1331, holding it as an "office fief" (or honor).

His adopted son John (II) died sometime before September 1333. The ailing John Babonić compiled his last will and testament in Patak Castle on 25 July 1334. He bequeathed his several possessions to the Pauline monastery of Saint Giles and the Augustinian monastery of Saint Stephen along the river Bodrog, both in Sátoraljaújhely, for the spiritual salvation of his late parents, sons and himself. Hrvoje Kekez incorrectly identified the place with Novigrad Podravski in Slavonia. John Babonić died shortly after, possibly within days.

== Sources ==
- Engel, Pál (1988). "Az ország újraegyesítése. I. Károly küzdelmei az oligarchák ellen (1310–1323) [Reunification of the Realm. The Struggles of Charles I Against the Oligarchs (1310–1323)]". Századok (in Hungarian). 122 (1–2). Magyar Történelmi Társulat: 89–146. ISSN 0039-8098.
- Engel, Pál (1996). Magyarország világi archontológiája, 1301–1457, I. [Secular Archontology of Hungary, 1301–1457, Volume I] (in Hungarian). História, MTA Történettudományi Intézete. ISBN 963-8312-44-0.
- Kádár, Tamás (2017). "Harcban a koronáért. (II.) I. Károly (Róbert) király uralkodásának 1306–1310 közötti szakasza [Fight for the Crown. The Reign of Charles I (Robert) from 1306 to 1310]". Történeti Tanulmányok. Acta Universitatis Debreceniensis (in Hungarian). 25: 126–192. ISSN 1217-4602.
- Kekez, Hrvoje (2011). Plemićki rod Babonića do kraja 14. stoljeća [The Noble Babonići Kindred until the End of the Fourteenth Century] (in Croatian). Doctoral thesis, University of Zagreb.
- Kekez, Hrvoje (2015). "The Travels of Ivan Babonić: The Mobility of Slavonian Noblemen in the Fourteenth Century". In Schmieder, Felicitas; O'Doherty, Marianne (eds.). Travels and Mobilities in the Middle Ages: From the Atlantic to the Black Sea. Vol. 21. Turnhout, Belgium: Brepols Publishers. pp. 143–162. ISBN 978-2-5035-5449-5.
- Kristó, Gyula (1979). A feudális széttagolódás Magyarországon [Feudal Anarchy in Hungary] (in Hungarian). Akadémiai Kiadó. ISBN 963-05-1595-4.
- Kristó, Gyula (2003). "I. Károly király harcai a tartományurak ellen (1310–1323) [The Struggles of Charles I Against the Oligarchs (1310–1323)]". Századok (in Hungarian). 137 (2). Magyar Történelmi Társulat: 297–347. ISSN 0039-8098.
- Markó, László (2006). A magyar állam főméltóságai Szent Istvántól napjainkig: Életrajzi Lexikon [Great Officers of State in Hungary from King Saint Stephen to Our Days: A Biographical Encyclopedia] (in Hungarian). Helikon Kiadó. ISBN 963-547-085-1.
- Nekić, Antun (2015). "The Oligarchs and the King in Medieval Slavonia, 1301–1342". Südost Forschungen. 74 (1): 1–25. doi:10.1515/sofo-2015-0104. ISSN 2364-9321.
- Thallóczy, Lajos (1897). A Blagay-család oklevéltára. Codex diplomaticus comitum de Blagay [The Charters of the Blagay Family] (in Hungarian and Latin). Monumenta Hungariae Historica. Diplomataria 28, Hungarian Academy of Sciences.
- Zsoldos, Attila (2015). "A királyi hatalom és Szlavónia a 14. század első negyedében / Kraljevska vlast i Slavonija u prvoj četvrtini 14. stoljeća [The Royal Power and Slavonia in the First Quarter of the Fourteenth Century]". In Fodor, Pál; Sokcsevits, Dénes; Turkalj, Jasna; Karbić, Damir (eds.). A horvát-magyar együttélés fordulópontjai: Intézmények, társadalom, gazdaság, kultúra / Prekretnice u suživotu Hrvata i Mađara: Ustanove, društvo, gospodarstvo i kultura [Turning Points of the Croatian-Hungarian Co-habitation: Institutions, Society, Economy and Culture] (in Hungarian and Croatian). MTA Bölcsészettudományi Kutatóközpont Történettudományi Intézet, Hrvatski institut za povijest. pp. 126–136, 184–194. ISBN 978-963-416-019-9.
- Zsoldos, Attila (2024). "László püspök várai [The Castles of Bishop Ladislaus]". In Hunyadi, Zsolt; Tamás, Kőfalvi (eds.). Napok, évek, századok. Tanulmányok Almási Tibor 65. születésnapjára (in Hungarian). SZTE Történeti Intézete és Történelemtudományi Doktori Iskolája. pp. 531–545. ISBN 978-963-306-965-3.

John I House of Babonić Born: ? Died: c. 25 July 1334
Political offices
Preceded by Stephen Babonić	Ban of Slavonia; 1316–1322	Succeeded by Nicholas Felsőlendvai
Preceded by Mladen Šubić	Ban of Croatia and Dalmatia; 1322	Vacant
Preceded by Mikcs Ákos	Treasurer of the Queen's Court; 1326–1333	Succeeded by Paul Garai
