= Ašelice =

- Location in Slovenia
- Coordinates: 45°40′31.08″N 15°7′0.77″E
- Country: Slovenia
- Traditional region: Lower Carniola
- Statistical region: Southeast Slovenia
- Municipality: Semič
- Elevation: 628.1 m (2,061 ft)

Population (2002)
  - Total: none

Ašelice (pronounced [ˈaːʃɛlitsɛ]; German: Aschelitz or Aschletz) is a remote abandoned settlement in the Municipality of Semič in southern Slovenia. The area is part of the traditional region of Lower Carniola and is now included in the Southeast Slovenia Statistical Region. Its territory is now part of the village of Mašelj. Ašelice lies high on a slope alongside an unpaved road east of Črmošnjice.

== Name ==
The name Aschelitz is believed to be derived from German Aschnitz, a name for the herb lady's mantle, thus referring to the local vegetation. However, other sources state that the name is of Slovene origin.

== History ==
Ašelice was one of only three Gottschee German villages mentioned in the land registers of the Dominion of Mihovo in 1603 and 1623. However, it was not included in the land registry of 1770. The village consisted of eight houses and 29 inhabitants in 1931, and 37 inhabitants in 1937. The Gottschee Germans were evicted from the village in the fall of 1941. Italian troops burned the village during the Rog Offensive in 1942.
