= Babonić family =

Croatian noble family

Babonić
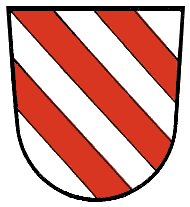
- Country: Kingdom of Croatia; Kingdom of Hungary; Duchy of Carniola
- Founded: 13th century
- Founder: Stephen I (nicknamed Babon)
- Current head: Extinct
- Final ruler: John I, Ban of Slavonia, Croatia and Dalmatia
- Titles: Counts of Gorica and Vodica (Croatian: knezovi Gorički i Vodički), Ban of Primorje, Ban of Slavonia, Ban of Croatia and Dalmatia
- Dissolution: 14th century
- Cadet branches: Blagaj family

The Babonić family (Hungarian: Babonics or Vodicsai) was an old and powerful Croatian noble family from the medieval Slavonia whose most notable members were Bans (viceroys) of Slavonia and Croatia.

== History ==
The first known member of this family who appeared in written documents at the end of the 12th century is Stephen I, known as Babon († at the beginning of the 13th century). The original possessions of Babonić were located on the right bank of the Kupa river between today's Karlovac and Sisak. Their first important stronghold was the town of Steničnjak. They built a stronghold in Blagaj on the Sana in 1240, and the Blagaj Castle in Blagaj on the Korana around 1266.

The rise of the family began at the turn of the 12th and 13th centuries when they received enormous estates from the Kings of Hungary. At the time of their greatest power, they held huge area from Carniola to Vrbas and from Sava to Gvozd, which also included fortified towns of Medvedgrad, Susedgrad, Kostanjevica and Mehovo.

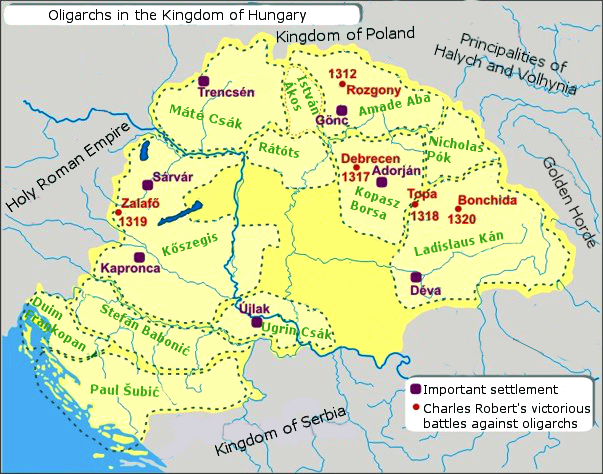
The provinces ruled by the "oligarchs" (powerful lords) in the early 14th century

They were related by blood to the most powerful families of the region, Counts of Gorizia, Venetian Morosini family, Zrinski, Frankopan and the Bosnian Kotromanić royal family through intermarriages.

The family divided their properties in 1313 and 1314 between brothers John (d. after 1334), Stephen IV (d. 1316) and Radoslav II (fl. 1284–1314). Radoslav received the town and estate of Blagaj on the Sana (Blagay), and his sons stopped using the family name, rather referring to themselves as Counts of Blagay.

== Family tree ==
Below is the complete family tree based on Hungarian historian Pál Engel's Medieval Hungarian Genealogy (2001) and Attila Zsoldos' archontology (2011):

- Nicolotus Orsini (?)
  - Stephen I of Goricha
    - Baboneg III, Vodičevo branch
      - Peter (fl. 1266)
      - Matthew (fl. 1266)
      - Christian (fl. 1266–1269)
      - James (fl. 1266–1269)
    - Stephen (?)
  - Baboneg I
    - Stephen II (fl. 1243–1256), Ban of Primorje (banus maritimus) (1243–1249)
      - Stephen III (fl. 1264–1295), Ban of Slavonia (in or before 1295), Goricha or Carniola branch
        - Ladislaus (fl. 1290–1315), married a daughter of Prijezda I, Ban of Bosnia
        - Stephen V (fl. 1290–1295)
          - Henry (fl. 1345)
          - Stephen VI (fl. 1345)
      - Radoslav I (fl. 1264–1295), Ban of Slavonia (1288, 1292, 1294)
        - sons (fl. 1294)
    - Baboneg II (fl. 1249–1256)
      - Nicholas I (fl. 1278–1292)
      - Stephen IV (fl. 1278–1316), Ban of Slavonia (1299; 1310–1316), Krupa branch (Krupski)
        - George (fl. 1321–1336)
        - John II (fl. 1321–1328)
        - Denis (fl. 1321–1370)
        - Paul (fl. 1321–1381), died without heirs
      - John I (fl. 1284–1334), Ban of Slavonia (1317–1322), Ban of Croatia and Dalmatia (1322), married Clara Euphemia, Countess of Gorizia
        - sons (d. before 1321)
        - a daughter (fl. 1328), married Peter II Kőszegi, the ancestor of the Herceg de Szekcső family
      - Otto (fl. 1284–1300)
      - Radoslav II (fl. 1284–1314)
        - Nicholas II (fl. 1321–1330)
        - Dujam (fl. 1321–1369), ancestor of the Blagay family

== Sources ==
- Curta, Florin (2006). Southeastern Europe in the Middle Ages, 500–1250. Cambridge University Press. ISBN 978-0-521-89452-4.
- Fine, John V. A. (1994). The Late Medieval Balkans: A Critical Survey from the Late Twelfth Century to the Ottoman Conquest. The University of Michigan Press. ISBN 0-472-08260-4.
- Kekez, Hrvoje (2008). "Između dva kralja: plemićki rod Babonića u vrijeme promjene na ugarsko-hrvatskom prijestolju, od 1290. do 1309. godine [Between two kings: the Babonić family in the period of dynastic succession on the Croatian and Hungarian throne, 1290–1310]". Povijesni prilozi (in Croatian). 35. Croatian Institute of History: 61–89. ISSN 0351-9767.
- Kekez, Hrvoje (2011). Plemićki rod Babonića do kraja 14. stoljeća [The Noble Babonići Kindred until the End of the Fourteenth Century] (in Croatian). Doctoral thesis, University of Zagreb.
- Koszta, László (1994). "Babonić". In Kristó, Gyula; Engel, Pál; Makk, Ferenc (eds.). Korai magyar történeti lexikon (9–14. század) [Encyclopedia of the Early Hungarian History (9th–14th centuries)] (in Hungarian). Akadémiai Kiadó. p. 73. ISBN 963-05-6722-9.
- Szeberényi, Gábor (2010). "A gorai comitatus a XIII. században. Megjegyzések a "hat gorai nemzetség" és a Babonić-ok korai történetéhez [The County of Gora in the 13th Century. Remarks to the Early History of the "Six Clans from Gora" and the Babonići]". Középkortörténeti tanulmányok 6 (in Hungarian). University of Szeged. pp. 233–248.
- Thallóczy, Lajos (1897). A Blagay-család oklevéltára. Codex diplomaticus comitum de Blagay [The Charters of the Blagay Family] (in Hungarian and Latin). Monumenta Hungariae Historica. Diplomataria 28, Hungarian Academy of Sciences.
