= Donja Stupnica =

Coordinates: 45°08′N 16°17′E

Donja Stupnica Доња Ступница (Serbian)
- Village
- Interactive map of Donja Stupnica
- Country: Croatia
- Region: Continental Croatia (Banovina)
- County: Sisak-Moslavina
- Municipality: Dvor

Area
  - Total: 0.69 sq mi (1.8 km^{2})

Population (2021)
  - Total: 59
  - Density: 85/sq mi (33/km^{2})
- Time zone: UTC+1 (CET)
  - Summer (DST): UTC+2 (CEST)

Donja Stupnica (Serbian Cyrillic: Доња Ступница) is a village in the municipality of Dvor, in Sisak-Moslavina county, Croatia.
