= Mihovo =

- Location in Slovenia
- Coordinates: 45°48′15.68″N 15°19′39.62″E
- Country: Slovenia
- Traditional region: Lower Carniola
- Statistical region: Southeast Slovenia
- Municipality: Šentjernej

Area
  - Total: 4.61 km^{2} (1.78 sq mi)
- Elevation: 326.1 m (1,070 ft)

Population (2002)
  - Total: 99
- Postal code: 8310

Mihovo (pronounced [ˈmiːxɔʋɔ]) is a settlement in the Gorjanci Mountains in the Municipality of Šentjernej in southeastern Slovenia. Its territory extends southwards right to the border with Croatia. The area is part of the traditional region of Lower Carniola. It is now included in the Southeast Slovenia Statistical Region.

Archaeological finds at a site close to the village have shown continuous occupation of the area with artefacts from the Neolithic, Bronze Age, Iron Age, Roman period, and early Medieval period.
