= Zrinska gora =

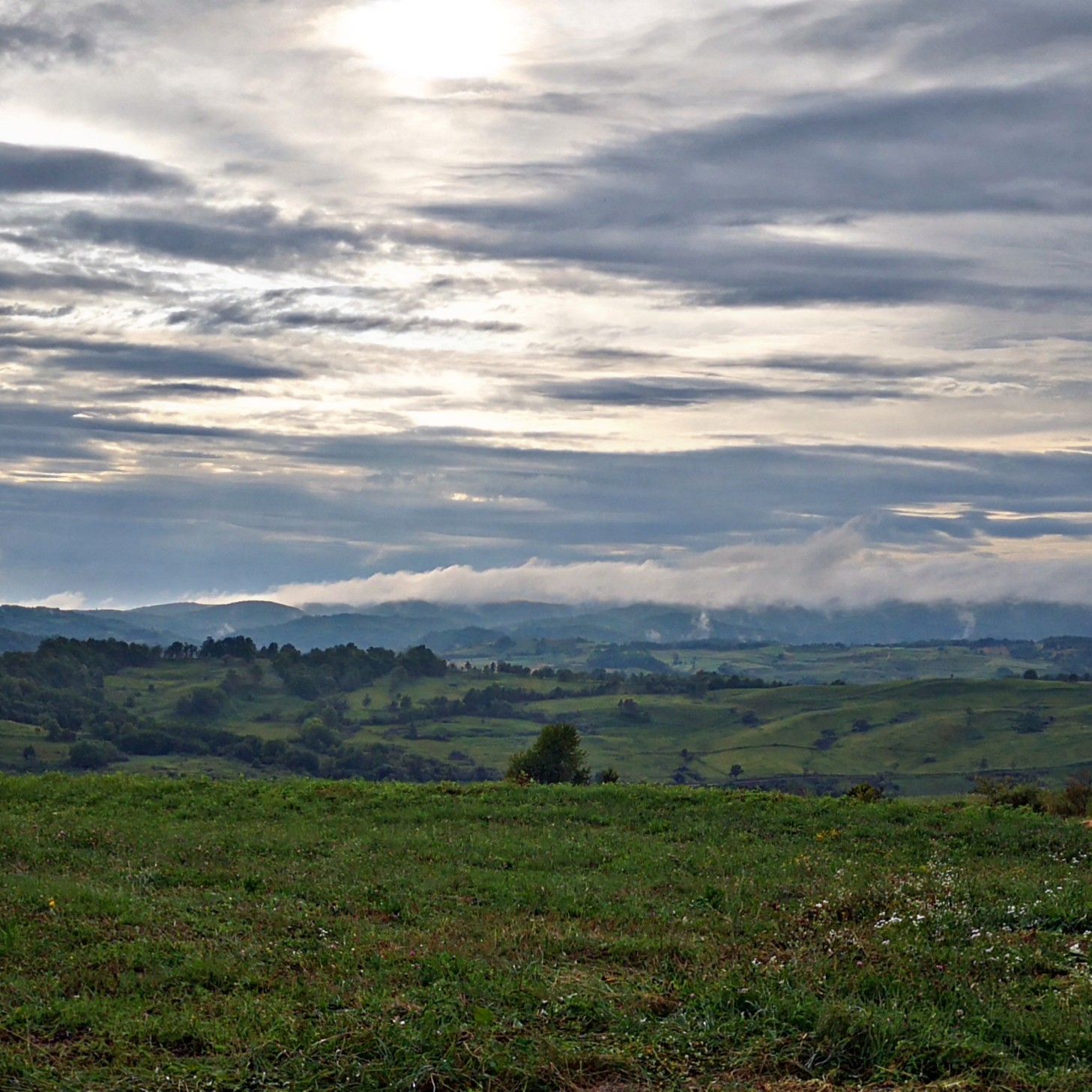
- Panoramic view of the mountain

Highest point
- Elevation: 616 m (2,021 ft)
- Coordinates: 45°11′28″N 16°13′56″E

Geography
- Location within Croatia
- Location: Croatia

Zrinska gora is a mountain in central Croatia. The highest peak is Piramida at 616 metres (2,021 ft).

== See also ==
- Zrin

== Bibliography ==
- Poljak, Željko (February 1959). "Zrinjska i Petrova gora". Kazalo za "Hrvatski planinar" i "Naše planine" 1898—1958 (PDF). Naše planine. Vol. XI. p. 8. ISSN 0354-0650.
