= Gornje Vodičevo =

- Village
- Location within Bosnia and Herzegovina
- Coordinates: 45°07′32″N 16°29′06″E
- Country: Bosnia and Herzegovina
- Entity: Republika Srpska
- Municipality: Novi Grad

Area
  - Total: 9.7 sq mi (25 km^{2})
- Time zone: UTC+1 (CET)
  - Summer (DST): UTC+2 (CEST)

Gornje Vodičevo (Serbian Cyrillic: Горње Водичево) is a village in the municipality of Novi Grad, Republika Srpska, Bosnia and Herzegovina. It consists of twenty hamlets; among them are Kukavice, Vukovići, Kestenova Dolina, Bundale, Rekići, Potok, Žljeba, Šurlani (Stanići), Kolundžije, and Đurđevići-Zecovi.

== History ==
County Vodice and village Vodičevo were mentioned for the first time in 1197 and, after that, in 1200. This county belonged to the Babonici princes.

Count Stephen of Gorica of the Babonić family, who was awarded the estate of Vodičevo in Bosnia for his successful defence of the border in White Carniola, ceded part of this estate to the Templars before 1210.

During the Turkish rule, Gornje Vodičevo was mentioned as a village in Kostajnica nahija (sub-district) in 1604. A sign of the Turkish rule over this region are ruins of a fortress which was 4m long, 2m wide (inner dimensions) and 7m high made of stone. The fortress walls were 65–70 cm thick. The fortress was located on the north side of hamlets Bundale and Rekići and on the right bank of the water stream called Vodičevo River.

In the time of Bosnia uprising 1875-1877 a great repression of the Turks on the villagers was reported. Two of Vodičevo villagers, Jovan Gligić and Simo Kolundžija, were killed by Turks and a great number of Serbs from Vodičevo and other villages escaped to Austria-Hungary.

During the second World War this village was known by their organized resistance to foreign occupation.

== 20th century censuses of the village population ==
According to a Yugoslav federal census as of 1948, this village had 142 homes and 750 inhabitants. In 1953 there were 725 inhabitants living in the village, in 1961 - 705, in 1971 - 646 and in 1981 - 499. Out of 499 inhabitants in 1981 there was one Croat, no Muslims, 414 Serbs, 82 Yugoslavs and 2 of unknown ethnicity.

== Geography ==
A geological study of Gornje Vodičevo was commissioned by Austro-Hungarian government in 1902. It was discovered that the village has large deposits of coal.

== Customs and beliefs ==
Serbs of Bosnian Krajina believe that hazel protects men against lightning strike and that this tree belongs to Perun, the god of thunder and lightning. In this village, on account of this belief, people, after receiving Communion, eat hazelnuts that must be cracked only by stone.

== Sources ==
- Borislav P. Đukić, Milivoj Rodić: Vodičevo: vijekovima na granici imperija; Viktorija, 2007
