= Krvna osveta =

Law of vendetta among South Slavic peoples

Krvna osveta (Serbian Cyrillic: Крвна освета) ("blood feud") is a law of vendetta among South Slavic peoples in Montenegro and Herzegovina that has been practiced by Serbs, Bosniaks, and Croats (predominantly from Herzegovina) throughout history. First recorded in medieval times, the feud is typically sparked by an offense such as murder, rape, assault, or similar wrongdoing. Associates or relatives of the victim, whether they are genuinely wronged or simply perceive it that way, are then prompted to fulfill the social obligation of avenging the victim. The revenge was seen as a way of maintaining one's honor, which was one of the most important aspects of traditional South Slavic culture.

== Origins ==
Among ethnic Albanians, particularly in Northern Albania and Kosovo, blood feuds are part of a centuries-old tradition. The rules associated with the feuding date back to the Kanun of Lek Dukagjin (also known as the Kanun or Code), which are a set of customary laws that trace back to at least the fifteenth century. The laws state that if a man's honor is deeply insulted, the man's family has the right to kill the person who insulted him. After the killing, however, the family of the victim are able to avenge the death by targeting male members of the killer's family. This often sets off a pattern of vengeful killing between the two families.

The tribal societies and traditions in the Dinaric regions of the Balkans date back to ancient times. As the Turks invaded the area around 1362, their invasion sparked new life to the warlike traditions of these tribes. Over 100 years after the Battle of Kosovo in 1389, these tribes ended up being the last of the Balkan peoples to be conquered. However, they continued to resist Turkish rule and Islam, and were never truly dominated. As Montenegro became a symbol of resistance, the tribal system grew in strength through battles and the widespread goal of liberation from the Turks. Many tribal societies, like that of Montenegro, functioned on a "self-help" principle, meaning that members would take it upon themselves to settle disputes rather than relying on the law or any other form of authority. Hence, the concepts of law and political organization were vastly different from the Western world, and the settling of disputes often took the form of blood feuds, with the lack of a centralized central power to control homicidal conflicts, allowing blood feuds to run rampant.

The practice started in the Balkans in the 15th century under Ottoman rule, and it became less common in the 19th century when the Balkan countries slowly got their independence from the Ottoman Empire. In pre-Ottoman Serbian principalities, blood money (vražda) was paid, one half went to the Serbian Orthodox Church and the other to the victim's family. After the Ottoman conquest of Serbia, self-governing clans often feuded with one another. Despite the crackdown and steep decline in feuding, it continues to persist in the face of legal prosecution today.

The unwritten laws of blood feuding commonly vary between one tribe and another. Hence, there is no continuous structure to the trajectory of blood feuds, and the typical course and ethics are subject to change between groups.

== Possible trajectory of a feud ==
The feuding typically began after a single or multiple homicide that could, in traditional feuding rules, be honorably avenged in blood. Typically, incidents where a death was ruled accidental did not require vengeance in blood, and would instead be solely a financial liability. In a case where a murderer, thief, or rapist was caught and killed in the act, the need for any further vengeance was usually obviated.

When a family member has been killed, the perpetrator's family (brotherhood/clan bratstvo) now has a "blood debt" (krvni dug), which can be removed only when the victim's family (an appointed member, osvetnik) has had its revenge by killing the aggressor or any member of the aggressor's family (often a close male kinsman, preferably the brother, but the killing of children was not encouraged). However, the blood feud continues if a relative decides on revenge, regardless of who started it. Killing in a person's own house is the worst action, as it is seen as immoral and a great shame in Montenegrin culture. If a criminal was murdered, it often did not result in a feud, as criminals have a negative connotation in the eyes of society, but in some cases, the criminal's family went on to kill serdars and other high-ranked people.

- In Montenegro, among local Slavic peoples, the feuds predominantly affected Montenegrins, mostly of Serbian and Albanian ethnicity.
- In Herzegovina (currently a region of both Montenegro and Bosnia & Herzegovina) Herzegovians had feuds with each other. A neutral region was Grahovo and Vučja Zuba (triangle of Boka Kotorska, Montenegro and Herzegovina), where blood feuds were not recorded, but some feuds between local Croats and Serbs have been known to exist.

The revenge is not limited to males; females that have their husbands or relatives killed could take on the blood debt. An instance is recorded in the Bjelopavlići clan in which a widow took out revenge for the murder of her husband.

These feuds could not occur between two members of the same clan. In Montenegrin cultural logic, retaliation through killing within the same clan was illogical. The cultural rationalization stated that, by the rules of feuding, a clan could not owe itself blood. A blood feud within clans would just weaken the clan in relation to others and reduce the clan's own blood. Hence, blood feuds between clan members were essentially nonexistent. Within tribes, a feud between two different clans often faced heavy societal pressure to pacify the feud, especially if the clans were located near each other.

If a clan finds and captures a person who has thieved from or killed a member of the clan, the clan can go to either the criminal's house or their relatives and inform the criminal's family that the person is a murderer or thief and propose something like "if we kill him, we are not to be held accountable." If the relatives answer "do what you like with him," the clan is able to kill the captive without owing a blood debt to the criminal's relatives because the clan settled the dispute.

The blood feuds resulted in instability in the Balkan diaspora for centuries.

== See also ==
- Gjakmarrja - the equivalent cultural practice among Albanians.
- Blood feud
- Sippenhaft - similar cultural practice among German peoples
- Eye for an eye
- Honour killing
