= Ban of Slavonia =

Title of the governor of Slavonia

Ban of Slavonia (Croatian: Slavonski ban; Hungarian: szlavón bán; Latin: Sclavoniæ banus) sometimes also Ban of "Whole Slavonia" (Croatian: ban cijele Slavonije; Hungarian: egész Szlavónia bánja; Latin: totius Sclavoniæ banus), was the title of the governor of a territory part of the medieval Kingdom of Hungary and Kingdom of Croatia.

From 1102, the title Ban of Croatia was appointed by the kings of Hungary, and there was at first a single ban for all of the Kingdom of Croatia and Dalmatia, but later the Slavonian domain got a separate ban. It included parts of present-day Central Croatia, western Slavonia and parts of northern Bosnia and Herzegovina. From 1225, the title started being held by a separate dignitary from the title of the Ban of Croatia and Dalmatia, and existed until 1476, when it was joined with the latter title.

In the 13th and 14th centuries, the more extensive title of Duke of Slavonia (meaning all lands of the Kingdom of Croatia and Dalmatia and Slavonian domain) was granted, mainly to relatives of Hungarian monarchs or other major noblemen.

According to the public law of the Kingdom of Hungary, bans were counted among the "barons of the realm" and thus they enjoyed several privileges connected to their office.

== Bans of Slavonia ==
Portrait	Name (Birth–Death)	Term start	Term end	Notes	Monarch (Reign)
	Michael, son of Ampud	1224	1224		Andrew II (1205–1235)
	Martin Ják	1224	1224		Andrew II (1205–1235)
	Aladar	1225	1226		Andrew II (1205–1235)
	Solomon Atyusz	1226			Andrew II (1205–1235)
	Julius I Kán	1229	1234		Andrew II (1205–1235)
	Apaj Gutkeled	1235	1238		Béla IV (1235–1270)
	Nicholas I Gutkeled	1240			Béla IV (1235–1270)
	Denis II Türje	1241	1244		Béla IV (1235–1270)
	Ladislaus I Kán	1245	1247		Béla IV (1235–1270)
	Rostislav Mikhailovich	1247	1248		Béla IV (1235–1270)
	Stephen I Gutkeled	1248	1260		Béla IV (1235–1270)
	Roland I Rátót	1261	1267		Béla IV (1235–1270)
	Henry I Kőszegi	1267	1270		Béla IV (1235–1270)
	Joachim Gutkeled	1270	1272		Béla IV (1235–1270)
	Mojs II	1272			Ladislaus IV the Cuman (1272–1290)
	Matthew II Csák	1272	1273		Ladislaus IV the Cuman (1272–1290)
	Henry I Kőszegi	1273	1274		Ladislaus IV the Cuman (1272–1290)
	Denis Péc	1274	1275		Ladislaus IV the Cuman (1272–1290)
	John Kőszegi	1275	1277		Ladislaus IV the Cuman (1272–1290)
	Thomas Hont-Pázmány	1275	1276		Ladislaus IV the Cuman (1272–1290)
	Nicholas I Kőszegi	1278	1278		Ladislaus IV the Cuman (1272–1290)
	Nicholas II Gutkeled	1278	1279		Ladislaus IV the Cuman (1272–1290)
	Radoslav Babonić	1288	1290		Ladislaus IV the Cuman (1272–1290)
	Nicholas II Kőszegi	1279	1281		Ladislaus IV the Cuman (1272–1290)
	Peter Tétény	1281	1283		
	Stephen II Gutkeled	1286			
	Radoslav Babonić	1290	1293		Andrew III the Venetian (1290–1301)
	Henry II Kőszegi	1291			Andrew III the Venetian (1290–1301)
	Jacob Kopasz	1298	1299		Andrew III the Venetian (1290–1301)
	Ladislaus Rátót	1300			Andrew III the Venetian (1290–1301)
	Henry II Kőszegi	1301	1309		Charles I (1301–1342)
	Stephen IV Babonić	1310	1316		Charles I (1301–1342)
	John Babonić	1316	1322		Charles I (1301–1342)
	Nicholas Felsőlendvai	1322	1324		Charles I (1301–1342)
	Mikac Mihaljević	1325	1343		Charles I (1301–1342)
	Mikac Mihaljević	1325	1343		Louis I the Great (1342–1383)
	Nicholas Lackfi	1342	1343		Louis I the Great (1342–1383)
	Nicholas VII Hahót	1343	1345	Also at the time the Ban of Croatia and Dalmatia	Louis I the Great (1342–1383)
	Nicholas Szécsi	1346	1349	Also at the time the Ban of Croatia and Dalmatia	Louis I the Great (1342–1383)
	Pavao Ugal	1350		Also at the time the Ban of Croatia and Dalmatia	Louis I the Great (1342–1383)
	Stephen I Lackfi	1350	1352	Also at the time the Ban of Croatia and Dalmatia	Louis I the Great (1342–1383)
	Nicholas VII Hahót	1353	1356	Second term. Also at the time the Ban of Croatia and Dalmatia	Louis I the Great (1342–1383)
	Leustachius Ratót	1356	1361		Louis I the Great (1342–1383)
	Stephen Kanizsai	1362	1366		Louis I the Great (1342–1383)
	Nicholas Szécsi	1366	1368	Second term.	Louis I the Great (1342–1383)
	Peter Cudar	1368	1380		Louis I the Great (1342–1383)
	John I Bánffy	1381	1385		Louis I the Great (1342–1383)
	John I Bánffy	1381	1385		Mary (1382–1395)
	John I Bánffy	1381	1385		Charles II of Durazzo (1385–1386)
	John I Bánffy	1381	1385		Sigismund (1387–1437)
	Stephen II Bánffy	1385	1387		Sigismund (1387–1437)
	Emeric I Bebek	1386			Sigismund (1387–1437)
	Ladislaus of Lučenec	1387	1389		Sigismund (1387–1437)
	Ivan Paližna	1389		Also at the time the Ban of Croatia and Dalmatia	Sigismund (1387–1437)
	Detrik Bebek	1389	1392		Sigismund (1387–1437)
	Ladislav Petrov	1392			Sigismund (1387–1437)
	Ivan Horvat	1392	1394		Sigismund (1387–1437)
	Detrik Bebek	1394	1397		Sigismund (1387–1437)
	Nicholas II Garai	1397	1401	Also at the time the ban of Croatia and Dalmatia	Sigismund (1387–1437)
	Ladislav Grđevački	1402	1404	Also at the time the ban of Croatia and Dalmatia	Sigismund (1387–1437)
	Paul Besenyő	1404	1406	Also at the time the ban of Croatia and Dalmatia	Sigismund (1387–1437)
	Hermann II of Celje	1406	1407	Also at the time the ban of Croatia and Dalmatia	Sigismund (1387–1437)
	Pavao Čupor	1412	1415		Sigismund (1387–1437)
	David I Lackfi	1416	1418		Sigismund (1387–1437)
	Denis Marcali	1419	1421		Sigismund (1387–1437)
	Hermann II of Celje	1423	1435		Sigismund (1387–1437)
	Matko Talovac	1435	1444		Sigismund (1387–1437)
	Matko Talovac	1435	1444		Albert I (1437–1439)
	Matko Talovac	1435	1444		Vladislaus I (1440–1444)
	Friedrick II of Celje	1445	1454		Ladislaus V the Posthumus (1444–1457)
	Ulrich II of Celje	1454	1456		Ladislaus V the Posthumus (1444–1457)
	John Marcali	1457			Ladislaus V the Posthumus (1444–1457)
	Jan Vitovec	1457	1463	Held office together with Nicholas of Ilok	Ladislaus V the Posthumus (1444–1457)
	Jan Vitovec	1457	1463	Held office together with Nicholas of Ilok	Matthias I (1458–1490)
	Nicholas of Ilok	1457	1463		Matthias I (1458–1490)
	Emeric Zápolya	1464	1465		Matthias I (1458–1490)
	John Thuz	1466	1470		Matthias I (1458–1490)
	Janus Pannonius	1469	1470		Matthias I (1458–1490)
	Blaise Magyar	1470	1472	Also at the time the Ban of Croatia and Dalmatia	Matthias I (1458–1490)
	Damjan Horvat	1472	1473	Also at the time the Ban of Croatia and Dalmatia	Matthias I (1458–1490)
	John I Ernuszt	1473	1476	Last Ban of "Whole Slavonia". Title rejoined with Ban of Croatia and Dalmatia.	Matthias I (1458–1490)

== See also ==
- Duke of Slavonia
- Ban of Croatia
- Slavonia
- Kingdom of Slavonia
- Croatia-Slavonia
- Slavonian Krajina
