= Familiaris =

Close associate of a medieval king

In the Middle Ages, a familiaris (plural familiares), more formally a familiaris regis ("familiar of the king") or familiaris curiae ("familiar of the court"), was, in the words of the historian W. L. Warren, "an intimate, a familiar resident or visitor in the [royal] household, a member of the familia, that wider family which embraces servants, confidents, and close associates." Warren adds that the term "defies adequate translation", but is distinct from courtier, "for the king employed his familiares on a variety of administrative tasks."

The familiares of a king are collectively referred to as the familia regis, which evolved into a private royal council—in England during the reign of Henry III (1216–72) and in France during that of Philip V (1316–22). In England, it was known as the concilium familiare or concilium privatum (Privy Council) and in France as the magnum consilium (great council, the Conseil du Roi). The familiares regis may have already formed an inner royal council in Sicily during the reign of Roger II (1130–54).

== Sources ==
- Takayama, Hiroshi (1989). "Familiares Regis and the Royal Inner Council in Twelfth-Century Sicily". The English Historical Review. 104 (411): 357–72. doi:10.1093/ehr/civ.ccccxi.357.
- Prestwich, J. O. (1981). "The Military Household of the Norman Kings". The English Historical Review. 96 (378): 1–35. doi:10.1093/ehr/xcvi.ccclxxviii.1.
- Prestwich, J. O. (1963). "Anglo-Norman Feudalism and the Problems of Continuity". Past and Present (26): 39–57. doi:10.1093/past/26.1.39.
- Hollister, C. W.; Baldwin, J. W. (1978). "The Rise of Administrative Kingship: Henry I and Philip Augustus". The American Historical Review. 83 (4): 867–905. doi:10.2307/1867650. JSTOR 1867650.
