= Hahóti family =

Hungarian noble family

House of Hahóti
- Parent house: gens Hahót
- Country: Kingdom of Hungary
- Founded: 1270s
- Founder: Keled
- Final ruler: John
- Dissolution: 1376

The Hahóti family was the name of a short-lived minor Hungarian noble family in Zala County, Kingdom of Hungary in the 14th century.

== History ==
The Hahóti family originated from the Arnold branch of the notable gens Hahót. According to the fourteenth-century chronicle composition, the founder of the kindred, knight Hahold descended from the Counts of Orlamünde, arriving to Hungary in 1163 upon the invitation of Stephen III to help to defeat the rebelled Csák kindred. Hahold's great-grandson Keled (or Cletus) served as Vice-ban of Slavonia in 1234. He had two children Keled II and Violant.

Keled II was involved in a lengthy lawsuit with some members of Ják clan – the sons of Ebed, ancestors of the Niczky family – sometime between 1267 and 1270, for unknown reasons. Béla IV of Hungary also ordered his arrest. Subsequently, the litigants reached an out-of-court settlement through the mediation of Lawrence Aba, the ispán of Sopron County, and his five co-judges. Keled had to pay 25 marks as a compensation and sentenced to 25-day imprisonment to the Vasvár prison. Keled was mentioned as a "royal man" in 1275. He is considered as the first member of the Hahóti family, descended from the Arnold branch, as a royal charter from 1277 referred to him as Hahóti (lit. "of Hahót"). During that time, he inherited a part of Nick from his kindred and involved in a lawsuit against the Ják clan and his own cousin, Nicholas III Hahót.

The last male member of the family John died in 1376 without heirs. On 13 March 1377, King Louis I of Hungary granted the status of a son to his only daughter Anne who married Nicholas de Surdis (or Lipoveci), a nephew of John de Surdis, Archbishop of Esztergom. The members of the Söjtöri (or also Hahóti) family protested against the method and filed a lawsuit in the royal court, without success.

=== Family tree ===
Ancestors of Keled II Hahót (later Hahóti)

16. Hahold I Hahót
8. Buzád I Hahót
4. Arnold I Hahót
2. Keled I Hahót
1. Keled II Hahót

- Keled (fl. 1270–77)
  - Arnold (fl. 1293–1327)
  - Michael (fl. 1293–1327), married Elizabeth N (fl. 1360)
    - Nicholas (fl. 1331–51)
    - John (fl. 1331–76), married Helen N (fl. 1360–80)
      - Anne (fl. 1360–1412); praefectio in filium, married Nicholas de Surdis
    - a daughter, married John Berzencei
    - a daughter, married John Balai from the gens Szalók

== Other Hahótis ==
The Söjtöri (or Falkosi) family of the Buzád branch, which descended from Herbord, son of Lancelot, was frequently also called as "Hahóti" throughout the 14th century by royal charters. Another member of the kindred, Nicholas V (fl. 1342) was also called Hahóti. His grandfather was Csák I, Lancelot's elder brother. After a praefectio in filium, his daughter Klara granted the village of Buzádsziget. Following that she mortgaged the estate to her husband John Koltai and his brother George. The living members of the Buzád branch (Söjtöris, Csányis and Szabaris) protested against the king's rule, but after a court decision they forced to hand over their property in Buzádsziget and Hahót to her.

== Sources ==
- Béli, Gábor (2013). "Börtönviselés perbeli egyezség alapján a XIII. században [Imprisonment on the Basis of a Court Settlement in the 13th Century]". In Máthé, Gábor; Révész, T. Mihály; Gosztonyi, Gergely (eds.). Jogtörténeti Parerga. Ünnepi tanulmányok Mezey Barna 60. születésnapja tiszteletére (in Hungarian). ELTE Eötvös Kiadó. pp. 66–72. ISBN 978-963-312-166-5.
- Vándor, László (1996). "A Hahót–Buzád nemzetség birtokközpontjai [The Seats of the Hahót–Buzád Family]". In Balažic, Janez; Vándor, László (eds.). Ljudje ob Muri – Népek a Mura mentén (in Hungarian). Provincial Museum of Murska Sobota – Göcseji Museum of Zalaegerszeg. pp. 135–141. ISBN 961-90438-0-4.
- Wertner, Mór (1898). "A Buzád–Hahót nemzetség [The Buzád–Hahót kindred]". Turul (in Hungarian). 16: 19–33, 59–65.
