= Panyit Hahót =

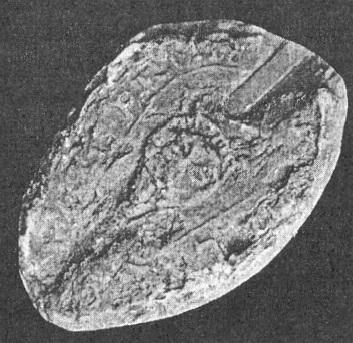
- Seal of Panyit Hahót, 1230s
- Died: after 1272
- Noble family: gens Hahót
- Issue: James a daughter
- Father: Arnold I

Panyit from the kindred Hahót (Hungarian: Hahót nembeli Panyit; died after 1272) was a Hungarian robber baron, who became infamous for his violent actions and plunderings against neighboring estates in the 1250s and 60s.

== Family background ==
Panyit was born into the gens Hahót as one of the three sons of Arnold I, who founded a monastery in Hahót, Zala County, dedicated to Saint Margaret. Panyit had two brothers, Arnold II, who served as Palatine of Hungary for a short time in 1242, and Keled I, the ancestor of the Hahóti noble family. Panyit had two children from his unidentified wife, including James, who held the dignity of Master of the stewards for Queen Dowager Elizabeth the Cuman in 1280.

According to a royal charter from 1259, a talented soldier and aspiring courtly knight, Reynold Básztély intended to marry Panyit's unidentified daughter, however the wealthy lord refused to consent, referring to that the young noble did not have enough possessions to repay the dowry later. Historian Attila Zsoldos also argued Panyit considered the marriage proposal as morganatic, as Reynold came from a kindred which belonged to the lower nobility in Esztergom County. However Duke Stephen, to benefit his loyal soldier, donated lands to Reynold to neutralize Panyit's argument, and Panyit's daughter, as part of her bride price, received the estates of Söjtör and Csesztve in Zala County, which then was attached to the Duchy of Styria, as part of Stephen's realm. Panyit himself was granted too several lands in Zala County by the duke, who separated those estates from the castle district of Zala in 1259. He also acquired Mórichely (today a borough of Nagykanizsa) from Stephen in the same year after its original owner Alexius died without male descendants.

== Crimes and offenses ==
Panyit became infamous for his violent actions and plunderings against neighboring estates in the 1250s and 60s, taking advantage of the emerging tensions between King Béla IV of Hungary and his son, Duke Stephen. In order to acquire his land, Panyit captured and imprisoned one of his neighbors, Gregory, son of Iharos in 1254. In the next year, Béla IV fined Panyit thirty denari for this violent act and forgery of document issued by Judge royal Henry Kőszegi, who sentenced in favour of Gregory during a lawsuit. In the same time, Panyit suppressed an uprising in his estate of Nick, sparked by cruel treatment and harassment of local castle folks by Panyit, who ignored their privileges.

After 1260, he was embroiled in conflict with sons of the late Ebed Ják, also ancestors of the prestigious Niczky (Nicki) noble family. He also harassed the lands of other local nobles, including Gregory Andi and Izsép Sukoródi. As a result, Béla IV sentenced confiscation of his lands (including Nick). In response, Panyit left Béla's realm and took an oath of allegiance to Duke Stephen. Although a joint court of Béla and Stephen also ruled against Panyit, the noble presented himself as victim of a political persecution, and procured a document from Duke Stephen in early October 1264, which set down the duke's promise that he will invalidate the judgment and return the confiscated lands to Panyit after the accession to the Hungarian throne.

Following a brief civil war, Béla was forced to accept the authority of Stephen at the eastern part of the realm. On 23 March 1266, father and son confirmed the peace in the Convent of the Blessed Virgin on the 'Rabbits' Island. In accordance with the peace treaty, Panyit, as Duke Stephen's "supporter", also received amnesty from Béla in exchange for a promise to abandon the trespass against local landowners. However Panyit did not fulfill the promise and ousted the Ják brothers from their land both in 1266 and 1267, also preventing the on-site inspection of the royal judges. On 15 September 1267, six appointed noble judges at the royal court, including his own cousin, the influential Csák Hahót ordered the enforcement and implementation of the previous sentence, declaring Panyit as "disruptive and common bandit". As a result, in the next few days, Béla ordered the confiscation of lands Nick and László (in Sopron County) from Panyit, in addition to his apprehension. To avoid imprisonment, Panyit appeared in court before Judge royal Ernye Ákos on 14 March 1268, and ceded Nick and some other lands in Somogy County to the Ják brothers. Recognizing the gesture, Béla IV returned other estates from Somogy County to Panyit in September 1268.

However Panyit only wanted to gain time with this act. In June 1269, his soldiers pestered and invaded the adjacent lands, and brutally massacred the local serf families. Gregory Andi and his son, in addition to a relative of Kemény Ják were also ruthlessly murdered having after their tongues cut out. The elderly Béla could no longer deal with the case. His son, Stephen V ascended the throne in May 1270. Despite his promise from 1264, the new monarch launched an investigation, and after having given the truth of the accusations, he ordered a trial by combat to 6 October 1270. However Panyit once again came to an agreement with his enemies and paid 170 denari compensation for the three counts of murder, damages and destructions. In 1272, he also handed over the lands Sukoró and Aszivágy as compensation. This is the last information about him.

== Sources ==
- Karácsonyi, János (1901). A magyar nemzetségek a XIV. század közepéig. II. kötet [The Hungarian genera until the middle of the 14th century, Vol. 2] (in Hungarian). Hungarian Academy of Sciences.
- Szűcs, Jenő (1993). Az utolsó Árpádok [The Last Árpáds] (in Hungarian). História, MTA Történettudományi Intézete. ISBN 963-8311-96-7.
- Zsoldos, Attila (1997). Az Árpádok és alattvalóik. Magyarország története 1301-ig [The Árpáds and their Subjects: a History of Hungary to 1301] (in Hungarian). Csokonai Kiadó. ISBN 963-260-103-3.
- Zsoldos, Attila (2007). Családi ügy: IV. Béla és István ifjabb király viszálya az 1260-as években [A family affair: The Conflict between Béla IV and Junior King Stephen in the 1260s] (in Hungarian). História, MTA Történettudományi Intézete. ISBN 978-963-9627-15-4.
- Zsoldos, Attila (2011). Magyarország világi archontológiája, 1000–1301 [Secular Archontology of Hungary, 1000–1301] (in Hungarian). História, MTA Történettudományi Intézete. ISBN 978-963-9627-38-3.
