= Hahót (genus) =

Hungarian noble clan

Genus (gens) Hahót
- Country: Kingdom of Hungary
- Founded: 1163
- Founder: Hahold I
- Final ruler: Nicholas VII
- Dissolution: 1360s
- Cadet branches: a, Arnold branch: House of Hahóti; b, Buzád branch: House of Csányi; House of Szabari; House of Söjtöri; c, Hahold branch: House of Bánfi

Hahót or Hahót–Buzád (also Hoholt, Hadod or Hahold) was the name of a gens (Latin for "clan"; nemzetség in Hungarian) in the Kingdom of Hungary, several prominent secular dignitaries came from this kindred. The last noble family, which originated from the kindred, became extinct in 1849.

== Origins ==
This clan was brought into Hungary by King Stephen, son of Bela II, in order to aid the said king. They are sprung from the counts of Orlamund. The first to come was called Hadolch, whose son was called by the like name of Hadolch and also Arnold. From them sprang Banus Buzad. The people of this country could not pronounce Hadolch, and so he was called by the similar name of Hohold. The clan of Chak conspired with some other clans against the King; it is said that they were defeated by Hohold and by the army which he had brought with him.

— Illuminated Chronicle

According to the fourteenth-century chronicle composition, the Hahót kindred descended from the Counts of Orlamünde, arriving to Hungary in the 1160s upon the invitation of Stephen III to help to defeat the rebelled Csák kindred. The first member of the clan was Hahold (Hahót), who suppressed the rebellion with his soldiers. The chronicle says Stephen, who invited the Hahóts, was a son of Béla II, which description fits to Stephen III's uncle, Anti-king Stephen IV. However both historians János Karácsonyi and Elemér Mályusz argued, the Hahóts took part in the defeat of the rebellious Stephen IV in 1163, who took assistance from some clans, includings Csáks, in addition to the Byzantine Empire. Historian Endre Tóth considers the Hahóts' settlement and defeating the Csáks as two separate events, and the latter one only marked the Hahóts' first prominent presence in national politics.

Simon of Kéza's Gesta Hunnorum et Hungarorum referred to the Hahót kindred as "Buzad autem generatio de Mesn originem trahit, nobiles de districtu Wircburg". Karácsonyi identified Wircburg as Marburg in March of Styria (today Maribor, Slovenia), while Mesn was identical with the nearby Messendorf, he claimed. Mályusz identified the two geographical names with Wartburg and Meissen in Thuringia (Margravate of Meissen), noting that none of them were part of the estates of the House of Weimar-Orlamünde, which ruled Meissen from 1046 to 1067. Endre Tóth tried to reconstruct the origin of the kindred based on the spread of the name Hahold in German-speaking areas. Near Freising, the name was relatively frequently used since the 8th century, in addition, it appeared altogether with the name Arnold in the 13th century, which was also used for four generations in the Hahót kindred.

== Seats and possessions ==
Following Stephen III's victory, Hahold received land donations and settled down in Zala County near the Austrian border. By the 13th century, his kindred possessed the most extensive estate in the county, along the rivers Kerka and Ledava, and in Prekmurje (today in Slovenia). In the early period, the family seat was Hahót, which was named after the kindred, between rivers Kanizsa and Pölöske. In 1192, Hahold II bought lands in Alsólendva (today Lendava, Slovenia) and in the surrounding areas (Venéce). His brother Buzád I was mentioned as a onetime owner of Újudvar, also in Zala County, by a royal charter of Béla III of Hungary, when he donated the estate to the Fehérvár monastery. Archaeologist László Vándor argued Hahold I was granted his coherent and extensive possession from a crown land after the cessation of the "gyepű" border system. Accordingly, the Hahóts' first lands were part of the so-called "gyepűelve", a mostly uninhabited or sparsely inhabited area beyond the Austrian border, comparable to the modern buffer zones. Vándor considered Újudvar (Nova Curia), where stone buildings, churches, monasteries were excavated, was the centre of this territory until the donation.

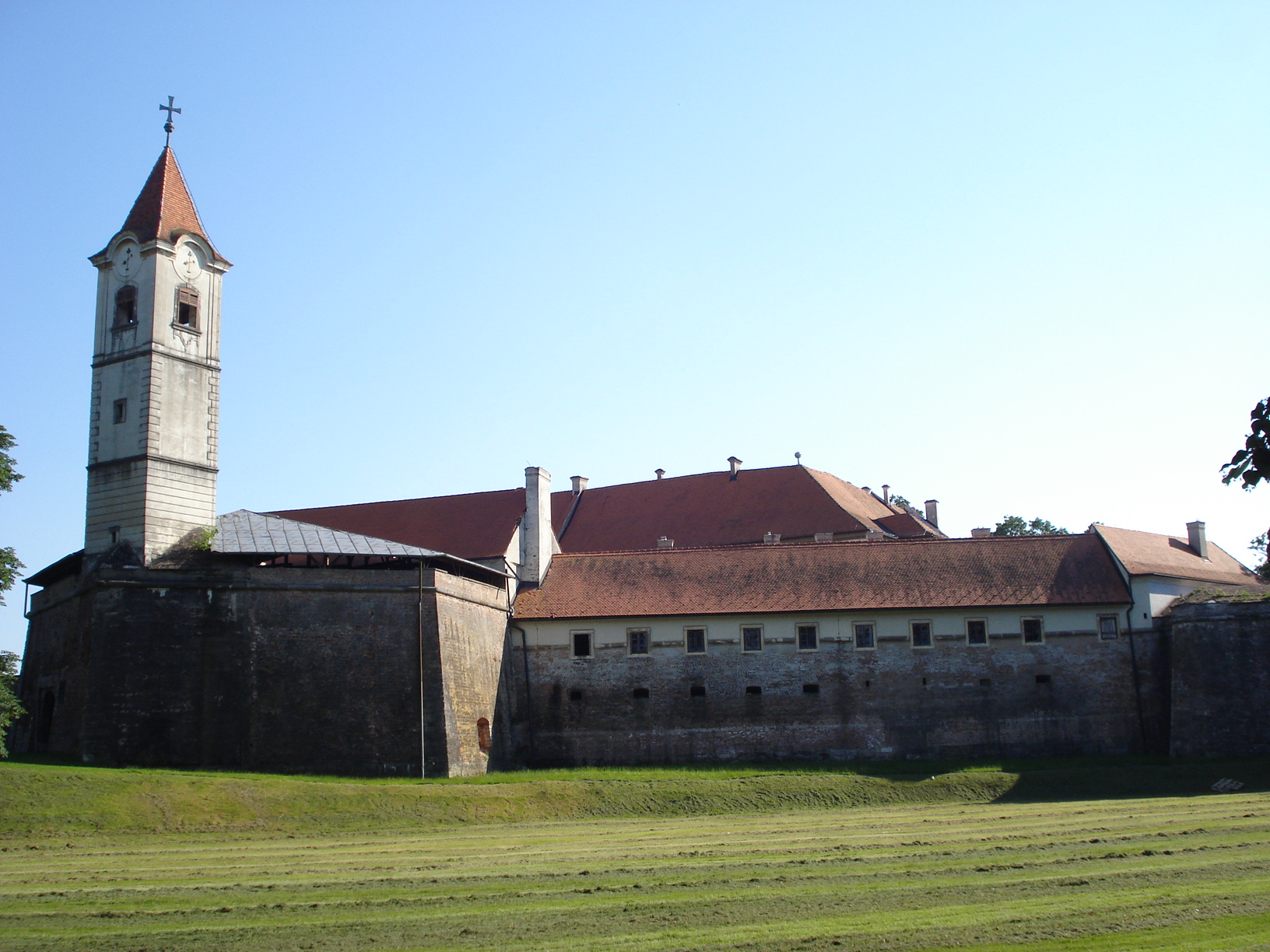
Csáktornya Castle (today Čakovec in Croatia)

By the 1230s, Buzád I's son Arnold I founded the kindred's monastery at Hahót, the namesake seat of his family, dedicated to Margaret of Antioch. Archaeologists argued the Hahóts erected their monastery on a basis of a royal convent founded by Ladislaus I of Hungary. However, in fact, the Hahót monastery was only a common burial place among the Hahót clan, as its branches moved away from each other by then. In 1248, Michael I of the Hahold branch founded a Franciscan friary in Szemenye (today in Muraszemenye), also dedicated to Mary the Virgin. Later the Bánfi de Alsólendva family, descendants of the Hahót kindred through his brother Hahold III, became patron of the monastery. One of the members of the more powerful Buzád branch, Atyusz (or Csák I) erected a Premonstratensian monastery at Rajk around 1270.

It is believed that Arnold II of the Arnold branch possibly have built the castles of Pölöske and Sztrigó (now Štrigova, Croatia) in Zala County during the 1240s, following the decision of Béla IV of Hungary to abandon the royal prerogative to build and own castles in response to the Mongol invasion. After the 1270s the gradually marginalized Arnold branch, resided on the western part of the Hahót basin, lost the ownership of Pölöske and Sztrigó against Ottokar II of Bohemia then the increasing powerful Kőszegi family. Nicholas III also owned Purbach (Hungarian: Feketeváros) in Sopron County, but after his rebellion in 1270, Stephen V of Hungary confiscated the castle and donated to his loyal soldier Panyit Miskolc. Until confiscation, Nick was also a property of Panyit Hahót. In Somogy County, the branch possessed Sukoró, Mórichely, Osziágy, Surd and Kákonya. For a time, James also owned Kálmáncsa and Dobsza, formerly queenly estates.

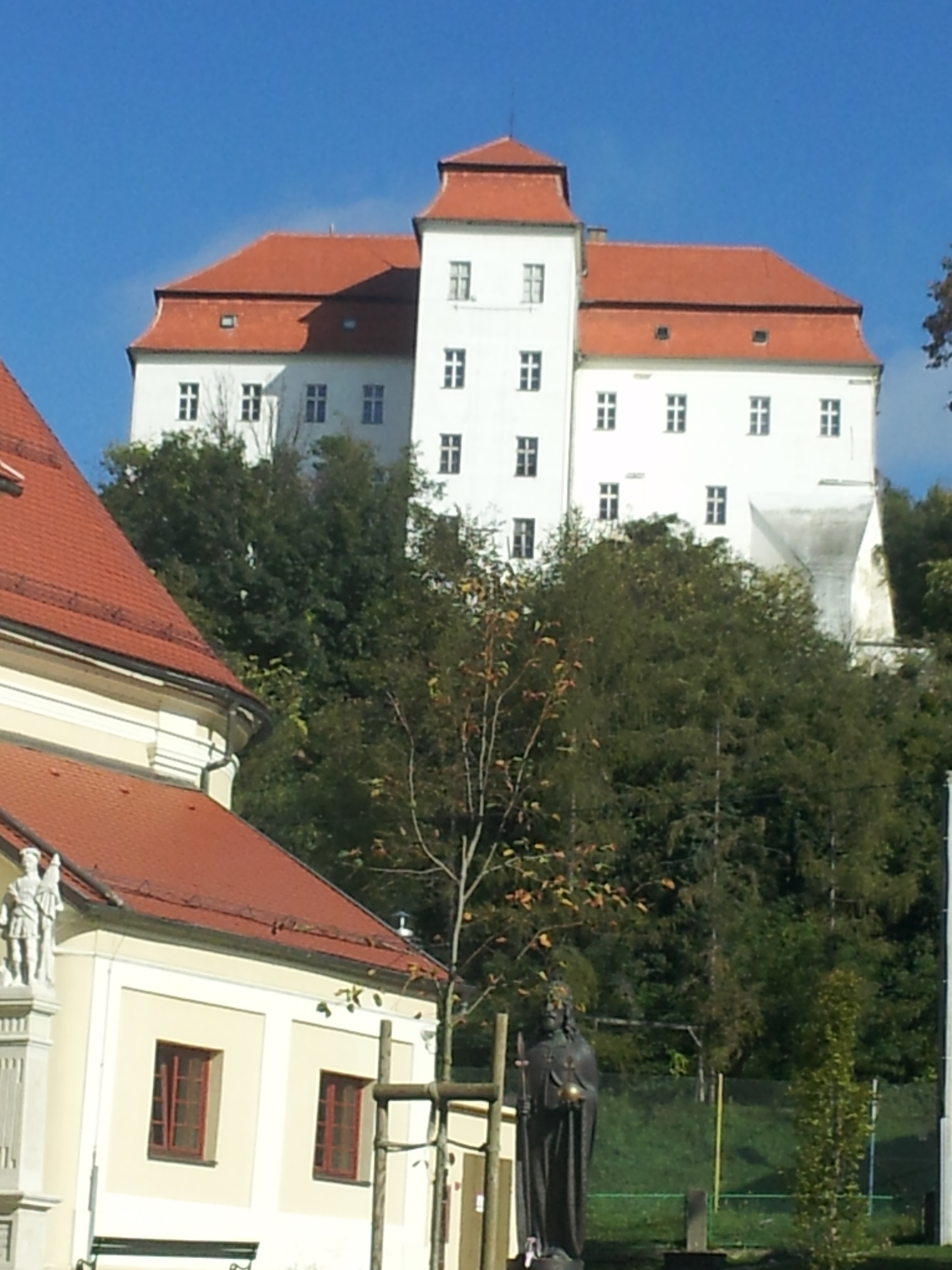
Alsólendva Castle (today Lendava in Slovenia)

By 1251, sons of Blessed Buzád (Buzád branch) built their own timber fortifications – Buzádtornya, Csáktornya, Terestyéntornya and Lankrédtornya (lit. Buzád's Tower, Csák's Tower, Tristan's Tower and Lancelot's Tower, respectively). Among them only Csáktornya (today Čakovec, Croatia) survived the following centuries, although the members of the family lost control over the area, having been the first known feudal lords of Međimurje.

Ottokar's army captured all castles in the early 1270s, causing the Buzád branch's move into Center Zala. The eldest son Buzád III also inherited Buzádsziget and Szabar from his father who entered the Dominican Order. His son Atyusz resided in Szabar and thus became ancestor of the Szabari family. Csák I's branch settled down in Csány after Ottokar's invasion – their descendants, the Csányi family originated from there. After a praefectio in filium by his father Nicholas V in 1365, Clara, a descendant of Buzád IV (son of Csák I) granted the village of Buzádsziget, while its fort was already demolished by then. Following that Clara mortgaged the estate to her husband John Koltai and his brother George. Tristan's branch became extinct after a generation. Herbord, son of Lancelot, owned Falkos and Söjtör, his descendants were frequently named after both villages. The Lancelot branch also owned Szombathely, Podturen, Belica among others once a long time ago. After his victorious unification war, Charles I of Hungary donated the liberated and formerly Hahót-owned estates to the emerging Lackfi family. Descendants of the Buzád branch (the Szabaris, Csányis and Söjtöris through the lineage of Buzád III, Csák I and Lancelot, respectively) unsuccessfully attempted to regain their former possessions on the occasion of a lawsuit lasted from 1351 until 1376.

Hahold IV of the Hahold branch called himself "Lord of Alsólendva" (today Lendava, Slovenia) in 1272, proving that he owned and possibly built the castle himself by then. The Kőszegis captured their castle around 1314, but Nicholas VII regained that in 1323. The Hahold branch owned villages and estates mostly the territory of today Slovenia. Nicholas VII received numerous land donations surrounding Alsólendva Castle, which became the domain of the Bánfi de Alsólendva family.

== Notable members ==
Hahold I

Ancestor and founder of the clan, a mercenary knight from Thuringia (possibly related to the Counts of Orlamünde), who was invited by King Stephen III against his uncle, Stephen IV, who contested his realm in 1163. Hahold's army defeated the Csák forces, who fought for the rebellious anti-king. After the internal war, he received land donations (e.g. Hahót, Pölöske) and settled down in Zala County. According to 18th-century archivist János Schenk, Hahold was granted the village of Lenti (Nempti) in 1172.

Buzád I (died 1192)

Son of Hahold I. Being ancestor of the Arnold and Buzád branches, he died by 1192.

Hahold II (fl. 1192)

Son of Hahold I. Being ancestor of the Hahold branch, he was mentioned as "religiosus miles" by the Chapter of Veszprém on the occasion of two property lawsuits, judged by Mog, Palatine of Hungary in 1192. This is the first source when a Palatine judged not only due special orders of the King, indicating that an independent palatinal judicial bench was established on a permanent basis.

=== Arnold branch ===
Arnold I (d. before 1234)

Son of Buzád I. The family monastery of the kindred, dedicated to Saint Margaret, was erected at Hahót, Zala County by Arnold I in the first half of the 13th century. He died by 1234.

Panyit (fl. 1230–72)

Son of Arnold I. He was infamous for his violent actions and plunderings against neighboring estates in the 1250s and 60s. In order to avoid accountability, he took an oath of allegiance to Duke Stephen in 1264.

Arnold II (fl. 1233–44)

Son of Arnold I. He served as Palatine of Hungary in 1242.

Keled I (fl. 1234–35)

Son of Arnold I. He simultaneously served as Vice-ban of Slavonia and ispán of Zagreb County in 1234. Through his son, Keled II, he was also ancestor of the Hahóti noble family.

James (fl. 1267–1301)

Son of Panyit. He was loyal to Queen Dowager Elizabeth the Cuman, and served as her Master of the stewards in 1280.

Nicholas III (fl. 1270–91)

Son of Arnold II. He rebelled against the rule of Stephen V of Hungary in November 1270 by recruiting Styrian knights, which caused the 1271 war between Hungary and Bohemia. Nicholas' rebellion was a dress rehearsal for the era of feudal anarchy lasted until the 1320s.

Arnold III (fl. 1266–92)

Son of Arnold II. He captured Andrew the Venetian and handed over him to Albert I, Duke of Austria in early 1290. Arnold was killed in the Siege of Pölöske in 1292.

=== Buzád branch ===
Buzád II (fl. 1209–41)

Son of Buzád I. Also referred to as Ban Buzád the Great, he was a loyal partisan of Duke Béla since the 1220s. He served as the first known Ban of Severin from around 1226 to 1232. Following that he gave up his position in society and entered the Dominican Order. He lived in a monastery at Pest, where the invading Mongols killed him shortly after the Battle of Mohi, for this, he is now honored as a Christian martyr by the Catholic Church.

Buzád III (fl. 1227–39)

Son of Buzád II. Also referred to as Buzád the Younger, he inherited Szabar (today Zalaszabar) from his father. He married Eve Atyusz, a daughter of ispán Sal Atyusz. He predeceased his father around November 1239.

Csák I (fl. 1234–69)

Son of Buzád II. He served as Master of the horse from 1245 to 1247. As ispán of Somogy County, he funded the frescos in the rotunda of Hidegség, an important medieval artistic heritage from Hungary. He functioned as Master of the treasury between 1248 and 1259. Belonging to his Styrian court, Csák was an influential supporter of the king's son, Duke Stephen, but later returned to King Béla IV's allegiance. He also served as Voivode of Transylvania for a short time in 1261. The town of Čakovec (Hungarian: Csáktornya, lit. "Csák's Tower") is named after him.

Tristan (fl. 1233–67)

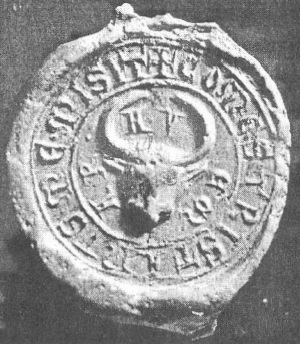
Seal of Tristan Hahót, 1255

Son of Buzád II. He served as Count of the Heralds (Hungarian: hirdetőispán; Latin: comes preconum) in 1255.

Lancelot (fl. 1234–59)

Son of Buzád II. He was also known as Lankréd (Lancret, Lancred). He had extended holdings in Vas and Zala Counties. Until 1256, he owned Szombathely, Podturen and Belica, when he sold to Michael I, the cousin of his father. He built Lankrédtornya (lit. Lancelot's Tower) which had demolished by the early 14th century. In 1259, he received lands – Palinovec, Nedelišće and Zunk – from Stephen, Duke of Styria between the rivers Drava and Mur. Therefore, it is possible that Lancelot took part in Stephen's campaign against the Styrian rebellious nobles in 1258.

Thomas (fl. 1227–56)

Son of Buzád III. He served as elected provost of Fehérvár and vice-chancellor from 1252 to 1254. He was Archbishop of Kalocsa between 1254 and 1256, his death.

Sal (fl. 1255–95)

Son of Buzád III. He was named after his maternal grandfather, Sal Atyusz. He functioned as lector at the Bács Cathedral (today in Bač, Serbia) between 1255 and 1256. Following that he served as provost of the Dömös monastery from around 1259 to 1295.

Atyusz (fl. 1273–1302)

Son of Buzád III. He participated in the war against Bohemia. He served as ispán of Veszprém County, then Zala County for a short time, both in 1274. He lost political influence for the next decade. He was appointed ispán of Somogy County in 1288, then governed Vas County in 1291. He served as head of the household of Queen Mother Tomasina Morosini in 1296. He died between 1302 and 1310. He was also ancestor of the Szabari noble family.

Csák II (fl. 1256–1308)

Son of Csák I. He served as sword-bearer from 1256 to 1257, then ispán of Vrbas County between 1266 and 1269. He was the ancestor of the Csányi noble family.

Michael III (fl. 1267–75)

Son of Tristan. He became patron of the Premonstratensian monastery at Rajk in 1275, receiving the right from the sons of Csák I.

Herbord (fl. 1273–1310)

Son of Lancelot. He had several conflicts over property matters with Conrad Győr from the Óvár branch. He participated in the 1273 war against Styria and Carinthia, ruled by Ottokar II of Bohemia. Through his sons, he was also the ancestor of the Söjtöri (frequently also mentioned as Hahóti, Falkosi) noble family.

=== Hahold branch ===
Hahold III (fl. 1226–39)

Son of Hahold II. He served as ispán of Vas County between 1237 and 1239.

Michael I (fl. 1222–56)

Son of Hahold II. He served as Master of the stewards for Queen Maria Laskarina from 1239 to 1240. Following the Battle of Mohi, he took care of the royal children until the king's court fled to Dalmatia. He was entrusted to maintain order in the area of Varaždin and Ptuj after the withdrawal of the Mongols in 1242. He was mentioned as ispán of Varaždin County in 1244. He founded the Szemenye monastery in 1248.

Hahold IV (fl. 1251–75)

Son of Hahold III. He served as ispán of Rovišće (Rojcsa) ispánate from around 1248 to 1255. In the 1260s, he had several conflicts with the Gyüre kindred, when Hahold's soldiers killed Thomas, who also acted as a royal emissary during that time. In 1272, he called himself "lord of Alsólendva" (today Lendava, Slovenia), proving that he owned the castle by then.

John (fl. 1266–94)

Presumably son of Michael I. He was a Dominican friar and served as Bishop of Skradin from 1248 to 1266, then Archbishop of Split from 1266 to 1294.

Stephen I (fl. 1272–97)

Son of Hahold IV. He participated in Andrew III's war against Austria. He served as chancellor of the royal stewards in 1291. He fought against the Kőszegis in the following years. He served as ispán of Varaždin County from 1272 to 1297.

Nicholas VII (fl. 1317–59)

Son of Stephen I. After participating in several campaigns against the oligarchs, he regained Alsólendva Castle and its surrounding villages from Charles I of Hungary in 1323. He served as Ban of Slavonia from 1343 to 1346 and from 1353 to 1356; and Ban of Croatia from 1345 to 1346 and from 1353 to 1356. In this capacity, he played a key role in the restoration of the Hungarian suzerainty over Croatia. He was the ancestor of the powerful Bánfi de Alsólendva noble family, which flourished until 1645.

== Family tree ==
The illustrated and decorated family tree of the Hahóts and their descendants was compiled sometime between 1678 and 1718 by an unknown author.

- Hahold I (fl. 1163)
  - Buzád I (d. before 1192)
    - Arnold I (d. before 1234)
      - Panyit (fl. 1230–72)
        - James (fl. 1267–1301), married Anne Tengerdi
          - Elizabeth (fl. 1309), married George Zákányi
        - a daughter (fl. 1259), married Reynold Básztély
      - Arnold II (fl. 1233–44)
        - Nicholas III (fl. 1270–91)
        - Arnold III (fl. 1266–92)
      - Keled I (fl. 1234–35)
        - Keled II (fl. 1270–77), ancestor of the Hahóti family
        - Violant (fl. 1292), married Mika II Ják
    - Buzád II (fl. 1209–41)
      - Buzád III (fl. 1227–39), married Eve Atyusz
        - Thomas (fl. 1227–56)
        - Sal (fl. 1255–95)
        - Atyusz (fl. 1273–1302), married twice
          - (1st) Elizabeth (fl. 1297), married Osl (II) Ostfi
          - (1st) John II (fl. 1310–48), married Margaret Nagymartoni; ancestor of the Szabari family
        - a daughter, married Ant Lőrinte
      - Csák I (fl. 1234–69)
        - Csák II (fl. 1256–1308)
          - Csák III (fl. 1308–25), ancestor of the Csányi family
        - Denis III (fl. 1267–75, d. before 1288)
        - Nicholas IV (fl. 1274–81)
        - Buzád IV (fl. 1274–1310)
          - Nicholas V (fl. 1342), also Hahóti
        - Frederick (fl. 1275–1306)
      - Tristan (fl. 1233–67)
        - Michael III (fl. 1267–75)
        - John I (d. before 1310)
      - Lancelot (fl. 1234–59), married N Tibold
        - Herbord (fl. 1273–1310)
          - Nicholas VI
            - Nicholas IX (fl. 1352–83), also Hahóti
          - Stephen II (fl. 1327)
          - Lawrence (fl. 1327–71), ancestor of the Söjtöri family
  - Hahold II (fl. 1192), married twice
    - (1st) Hahold III (fl. 1226–39)
      - Hahold IV (fl. 1251–75)
        - Matthew (fl. 1272)
        - Stephen I (fl. 1272–97), married N Péc
          - Nicholas VII (fl. 1317–59), ancestor of the Bánfi family
            - Stephen I Bánfi (fl. 1335–85)
            - Francis (fl. 1335–56)
            - Nicholas VIII (fl. 1335–36)
            - John I Bánfi (fl. 1339–94)
            - Nicholas I Bánfi (fl. 1356–89)
            - Ladislaus I Bánfi (fl. 1356–81)
            - a daughter (fl. 1371), married Henry Rohonci
    - (1st) Michael I (fl. 1222–56), married twice
      - (1st) Michael II (fl. 1256–74)
      - (1st) a daughter (fl. 1256), married Györk Atyusz
      - (?) John (fl. 1266–94)
    - (2nd) Ákos (fl. 1222–34)
      - Nicholas II (c. 1260)
    - (2nd) Nicholas I (fl. 1222–34)
      - (?) Videh (c. 1260)
    - (2nd) Denis I (fl. 1234)
      - (?) Denis II (c. 1260)

== See also ==
- List of feudal lords of Međimurje
- Međimurje

== Sources ==
- Cselenkó, Borbála (2006). Szerzetesrendek az Árpád-kori Zala megyében [Monasteries in Zala County of the Era of the Árpáds] (in Hungarian). Zalai Kismonográfiák 9., Zala Megyei Múzeumok Igazgatósága. ISBN 963-7205-43-8.
- Engel, Pál (1996). Magyarország világi archontológiája, 1301–1457, I. [Secular Archontology of Hungary, 1301–1457, Volume I] (in Hungarian). História, MTA Történettudományi Intézete. ISBN 963-8312-44-0.
- Karácsonyi, János (1901). A magyar nemzetségek a XIV. század közepéig. II. kötet [The Hungarian genera until the middle of the 14th century, Vol. 2] (in Hungarian). Hungarian Academy of Sciences.
- Mályusz, Elemér (1971). Az V. István-kori geszta [The Gesta of the Age of Stephen V]. Akadémiai Kiadó.
- Markó, László (2006). A magyar állam főméltóságai Szent Istvántól napjainkig: Életrajzi Lexikon [Great Officers of State in Hungary from King Saint Stephen to Our Days: A Biographical Encyclopedia] (in Hungarian). Helikon Kiadó. ISBN 963-208-970-7.
- Nemes, Gábor (2006). "Az Atyusz nemzetség". In J. Újváry, Zsuzsanna (ed.). Tanulmányok évszázadok történelméből [Essays on Centuries of History] (in Hungarian). Pázmány Péter Catholic University. pp. 13–39. ISBN 963-9206-24-5.
- Szőcs, Tibor (2014). A nádori intézmény korai története, 1000–1342 [An Early History of the Palatinal Institution: 1000–1342] (in Hungarian). Magyar Tudományos Akadémia Támogatott Kutatások Irodája. ISBN 978-963-508-697-9.
- Tantalics, Béla (2009). A Bánffy család szellemi hagyatéka [The Intellectual Legacy of the Bánffy Family] (in Hungarian). Lenti Honismereti Egyesület. ISBN 978-963-06-5372-5.
- Tóth, Endre (2003). "Hoholt – Hahót: A jövevény nemzetségek eredetéhez [Hoholt – Hahót: On the Origin of the Foreign Kindreds]". Századok (in Hungarian). 137 (2). Magyar Történelmi Társulat: 265–296. ISSN 0039-8098.
- Vándor, László (1989). "A Hahót-nemzetség korai központjai /Adatok a zalai várépítészet kezdeteihez/ [Early Seats of the Hahót Kindred /Datas to the Beginning of the Castle Buildings in Zala County/]". In Somfai, Balázs (ed.). A Dunántúl településtörténete VII. Falvak, várak és puszták a Dunántúlon (XI–XIX. század) (in Hungarian). Hungarian Academy of Sciences. pp. 53–60. ISBN 963-7121-16-1.
- Vándor, László (1994). "A Hahót–Buzád nemzetség birtokközpontjainak kialakulása Zala vármegyében (az alsólendvai vár keletkezésének körülményei) [The Emergence of Seats of the Hahót–Buzád Kindred (The Circumstances of the Erection of Lendava Castle)]". In Göncz, László (ed.). Lendava – Lendva. Študije o zgodovini Lendave – Tanulmányok Lendva történelméből (in Hungarian). Magyar Nemzetiségi Művelődési Intézet. pp. 58–63.
- Vándor, László (1996). "A Hahót–Buzád nemzetség birtokközpontjai [The Seats of the Hahót–Buzád Family]". In Balažic, Janez; Vándor, László (eds.). Ljudje ob Muri – Népek a Mura mentén (in Hungarian). Provincial Museum of Murska Sobota – Göcseji Museum of Zalaegerszeg. pp. 135–141. ISBN 961-90438-0-4.
- Wertner, Mór (1898). "A Buzád–Hahót nemzetség [The Buzád–Hahót kindred]". Turul (in Hungarian). 16. Magyar Heraldikai és Genealógiai Társaság: 19–33, 59–65. ISSN 1216-7258.
- Zsoldos, Attila (2007). Családi ügy: IV. Béla és István ifjabb király viszálya az 1260-as években [A family affair: The Conflict between Béla IV and Junior King Stephen in the 1260s] (in Hungarian). História, MTA Történettudományi Intézete. ISBN 978-963-9627-15-4.
- Zsoldos, Attila (2011). Magyarország világi archontológiája, 1000–1301 [Secular Archontology of Hungary, 1000–1301] (in Hungarian). História, MTA Történettudományi Intézete. ISBN 978-963-9627-38-3.
- The Hungarian Illuminated Chronicle: Chronica de Gestis Hungarorum (Edited by Dezső Dercsényi) (1970). Corvina, Taplinger Publishing. ISBN 0-8008-4015-1.
