= Szabari family =

Hungarian noble family

House of Szabari
- Parent house: gens Hahót
- Country: Kingdom of Hungary
- Founded: c. 1310
- Founder: John I
- Final ruler: Atyusz or Peter
- Dissolution: c. 1384

The Szabari family or Szabary was the name of a short-lived minor Hungarian noble family in Zala County, Kingdom of Hungary in the 14th century.

== History ==
The Szabari family originated from the notable gens Hahót. According to the fourteenth-century chronicle composition, the founder of the kindred, knight Hahold descended from the Counts of Orlamünde, arriving to Hungary in 1163 upon the invitation of Stephen III to help to defeat the rebelled Csák kindred. Hahold's grandson Blessed Buzád, who retired from politics and joined the Dominican Order, donated his estates of Buzádsziget and Szabar (today Zalaszabar) to his eldest son Buzád III on 14 February 1233. After the invasions of Ottokar II of Bohemia and the powerful Kőszegi family, who established dominion independently of the royal power since the early 1270s, Buzád III's son Atyusz resided permanently in Szabar. For his participation in the military campaign against Ottokar, he received the lands of Kerecseny and Palkonya from Ladislaus IV of Hungary.

Atyusz Hahót had a son from his first unidentified wife, John II Hahót who later adopted the surname Szabari ("of Szabar") in his documents (John I Szabari in genealogical sense), thus became the first member of the Szabari family. In 1292, among others, he was sent to the Kőszegis as a hostage in order to liberate Andrew III of Hungary. His father Atyusz died between 1302 and 1310. John was still minor during his death, therefore, his much older cousin John Pacsai from the gens Lőrinte became his guardian. Despite being a sole heir, John had financial problems already in 1310, when he had to sell his estates of Szölc, Pácod and Budafa (today Zalalövő) to the Salamonvári family to pay the dowry of his stepmother, Atyusz's second wife. He also donated Buzádsziget to John Lőrinte in 1313 to settle his debt. On 27 June 1323, he also had to sell below fair value his land of Ivánc, near Felsőlendva (today Grad, Slovenia) to Nicholas Felsőlendvai, Ban of Slavonia, who commiserated John and handed over his small land of Baráti in Somogy County to him. In 1332, John owned Gelsesziget and Bagota in Zala County. He was last mentioned by sources in 1348. He died by 15 May 1353, as his wife Margaret Nagymartoni appeared then as his widow.

His sons Lőkös, John II and Atyusz were first mentioned in 1348. The latter two of them attacked and tried to kill one of the officials of the Zalavár Abbey, according to a charter issued on 2 June 1351. They also appeared as members of the "Buzád kindred" in August 1360, when descendants of the Buzád branch (the Szabaris, Csányis and Söjtöris through the lineage of Buzád III, Csák I and Lancelot, respectively) unsuccessfully attempted to regain their former possessions from the Lackfi family on the occasion of a lawsuit lasted from 1351 until 1376. In December 1365, John II and Atyusz protested against that after a praefectio in filium by his father Nicholas V, Clara, a descendant of Buzád IV (son of Csák I) granted the village of Buzádsziget. The document also mentioned John's minor son without name. In 1368 and 1376, only Atyusz and John's son Peter were alive. They died without male heirs by 1384, as Mary, Queen of Hungary donated the family's orphaned lands to the distant relative Bánfi de Alsólendva family after the Szabaris' extinction.

== Family tree ==
Ancestors of John I Szabari

16. Buzád I Hahót
8. Buzád II Hahót
4. Buzád III Hahót
2. Atyusz Hahót
10. Sal Atyusz
5. Eve Atyusz
1. John I Szabari
3. Atyusz's first wife

- John I (fl. 1292–1348; d. before 1353), married Margaret Nagymartoni (fl. 1353)
  - Lőkös (fl. 1348)
  - John II (fl. 1348–65)
    - Peter (fl. 1365–76), died without male heirs before 1384
  - Atyusz (fl. 1348–76), died without male heirs before 1384
  - a daughter, married George Köcski, son of Judge royal Alexander Köcski

== Sources ==
- Vándor, László (1994). "A Hahót–Buzád nemzetség birtokközpontjainak kialakulása Zala vármegyében (az alsólendvai vár keletkezésének körülményei [The Emergence of Seats of the Hahót–Buzád Kindred (The Circumstances of the Erection of Lendava Castle]". In Göncz, László (ed.). Lendava – Lendva. Študije o zgodovini Lendave – Tanulmányok Lendva történelméből (in Hungarian). Magyar Nemzetiségi Művelődési Intézet. pp. 58–63.
- Vándor, László (1996). "A Hahót–Buzád nemzetség birtokközpontjai [The Seats of the Hahót–Buzád Family]". In Balažic, Janez; Vándor, László (eds.). Ljudje ob Muri – Népek a Mura mentén (in Hungarian). Provincial Museum of Murska Sobota – Göcseji Museum of Zalaegerszeg. pp. 135–141. ISBN 961-90438-0-4.
- Wertner, Mór (1898). "A Buzád–Hahót nemzetség [The Buzád–Hahót kindred]". Turul (in Hungarian). 16: 19–33, 59–65.
