= Keled Hahót =

Keled (I) Hahót

Vice-ban of Slavonia
- Reign: 1234
- Predecessor: Alberic
- Successor: Jaksa Isaan
- Died: after 1235
- Noble family: gens Hahót
- Issue: Keled II; Violant
- Father: Arnold I

Keled (I) from the kindred Hahót (Hungarian: Hahót nembeli (I.) Keled; fl. 1234–35) was a Hungarian noble, who served as Vice-ban of Slavonia and ispán of Zagreb County in 1234. He held both offices simultaneously, when the powerful baron Julius Kán served as King Andrew II's last Ban of Slavonia.

Keled was born into the Arnold branch of the gens Hahót as the son of Arnold I (died before 1234), who founded a monastery in Hahót, Zala County, dedicated to Saint Margaret. Keled had two brothers, Arnold II, who served as Palatine of Hungary for a short time in 1242, and Panyit, who became infamous for his violent actions and plunderings against neighboring estates in the 1250–60s. Keled had two children from his unidentified wife. His son was Keled II (fl. 1270–77), who later inherited a part of Nick from his kindred and involved in a lawsuit against the Ják clan. His daughter Violant (fl. 1292) married Mike II Ják. Through his son, Keled I was also ancestor one of the noble families which originated from the gens Hahót and called themselves "Hahóti" (lit. "from Hahót", the spiritual seat of the clan). This family became extinct after three generations by the 1370s.

== Sources ==
- Szőcs, Tibor (2014). A nádori intézmény korai története, 1000–1342 [An Early History of the Palatinal Institution: 1000–1342] (in Hungarian). Magyar Tudományos Akadémia Támogatott Kutatások Irodája. ISBN 978-963-508-697-9.
- Zsoldos, Attila (2011). Magyarország világi archontológiája, 1000–1301 [Secular Archontology of Hungary, 1000–1301] (in Hungarian). História, MTA Történettudományi Intézete. ISBN 978-963-9627-38-3.

Keled I Genus Hahót Born: ? Died: after 1235
Political offices
| Preceded by Alberic | Vice-ban of Slavonia; 1234 | Succeeded by Jaksa Isaan |
| Preceded by Neemilus | Ispán of Zagreb; 1234 | Succeeded by Ivánka Zsadány |
