= Hahót =

Hahót may refer to:

- Hahót, Zala, a village in Hungary
- Hahót (genus), a Hungarian noble family (including a list of people whose surname is Hahót)
