= Arnold II Hahót =

Hungarian baron

Arnold (II) Hahót
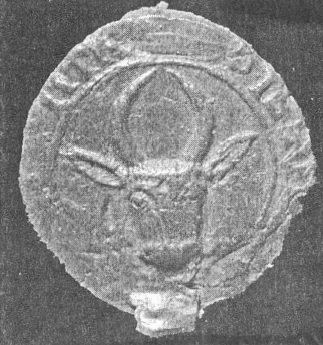
- Seal of Arnold II Hahót, 1239

Palatine of Hungary
- Reign: 1242
- Predecessor: Denis Tomaj
- Successor: Ladislaus Kán
- Died: after 1244
- Noble family: gens Hahót
- Issue: Nicholas III; Arnold III
- Father: Arnold I

Arnold (II) from the kindred Hahót (Hungarian: Hahót nembeli (II.) Arnold; died after 1244) was a Hungarian baron, who served as Palatine of Hungary for a short time in 1242.

== Career ==
Arnold II was born into the gens Hahót as one of the three sons of Arnold I, who founded a monastery in Hahót, Zala County, dedicated to Saint Margaret. Arnold had two brothers, Panyit, who became infamous for his violent actions and plunderings against neighboring estates in the 1250s and 60s, and Keled I, the ancestor of the Hahóti noble family. Arnold II had two sons from his unidentified wife: Nicholas III, who rebelled against the rule of King Stephen V in 1270, and Arnold III, who captured pretender Andrew the Venetian in 1290 (later King of Hungary as Andrew III).

Arnold was first mentioned by contemporary sources since 1233. Then he was a supporter of Duke Béla, who had long opposed his father, King Andrew II's "useless and superfluous perpetual grants". After Béla succeeded his father without opposition in October 1235, Arnold served as ispán of Zala County from 1235 to 1239. In this capacity, Arnold was entrusted to lead that investigation committee in 1236–1237, which supervised and sometimes overruled previous land grants occurred in the southwestern part of Transdanubia (primarily Zala County). Under Arnold, several local nobles and clergymen took part in the process, for instance Bartholomew, Bishop of Veszprém, Casimir, the provost of Veszprém and Michael, the count of tárnoks, in addition to members of the lesser nobility. Following that he was made ispán of Somogy County in 1240, holding the position until November 1242. After the Battle of Mohi, where Palatine Denis Tomaj was killed, Arnold was appointed as his successor following nearly one-year vacancy. It is possible that after the catastrophic battle, Arnold joined the entourage of Béla IV, who narrowly escaped from the battlefield and fled to Dalmatia. Perhaps Arnold was appointed Palatine on a temporary basis, when Béla waited in exile until the withdrawal of all Mongol forces, and later re-establishment of the royal court in Hungary. Since Arnold's term, the Somogy ispánate was attached to the dignity of Palatine, lasted until 1246.

After replacing as Palatine, Arnold functioned as ispán of Sopron County in 1243. During that time, he received land donations from Béla IV. Possibly it was Arnold who built the castles of Pölöske and Sztrigó (today Štrigova, Croatia) in Zala County in the 1240s, after Béla abandoned the ancient royal prerogative to build and own castles in response to the Mongol invasion. Arnold served as ispán of Nyitra County in 1244; according to a non-authentic charter, he held the office in 1245 too. As his younger son Arnold III was referred to as minor in 1270, it is plausible that Arnold II was still alive in the late 1250s.

== Sources ==
- Kis, Péter (2010). A királyi szolgálónépi szervezet a 13–14. században [The Organization of Royal Servants in the 13–14th Centuries]. Szeged: Szegedi Középkortörténeti Könyvtár. ISBN 978-963-306-080-3.
- Markó, László (2006). A magyar állam főméltóságai Szent Istvántól napjainkig: Életrajzi Lexikon [Great Officers of State in Hungary from King Saint Stephen to Our Days: A Biographical Encyclopedia] (in Hungarian). Helikon Kiadó. ISBN 963-208-970-7.
- Szőcs, Tibor (2014). A nádori intézmény korai története, 1000–1342 [An Early History of the Palatinal Institution: 1000–1342] (in Hungarian). Magyar Tudományos Akadémia Támogatott Kutatások Irodája. ISBN 978-963-508-697-9.
- Zsoldos, Attila (2011). Magyarország világi archontológiája, 1000–1301 [Secular Archontology of Hungary, 1000–1301] (in Hungarian). História, MTA Történettudományi Intézete. ISBN 978-963-9627-38-3.

Arnold II Genus Hahót Born: ? Died: after 1244
Political offices
Preceded by Denis Tomaj	Palatine of Hungary; 1242	Succeeded by Ladislaus Kán
