= Atyusz Hahót =

Hungarian noble

Ispán of Vas
- Reign: 1291–1292
- Predecessor: Ivan Kőszegi
- Successor: Ivan Kőszegi
- Died: between 1302 and 1310
- Noble family: gens Hahót
- Spouses: 1, unidentified 2, unidentified
- Issue: (1st m.) Elizabeth (1st m.) John II
- Father: Buzád III
- Mother: Eve Atyusz

Atyusz from the kindred Hahót (Hungarian: Hahót nembeli Atyusz; fl. 1273–1302) was a Hungarian noble, who served as ispán of several counties in the second half of the 13th century. He was also the ancestor of the Szabari noble family.

== Family background ==
Atyusz was born into the Buzád branch of the gens Hahót as the son of Buzád III Hahót and Eve Atyusz. He was named after Atyusz III Atyusz, the most powerful and notable member of his mother's kindred. His grandfathers were Buzád II Hahót, a loyal baron of Duke Béla and later Dominican martyr of the Christian Church, and Sal Atyusz, who held the position of ispán of Karakó ispánate in 1205. Atyusz had three siblings: Thomas, who served as Archbishop of Kalocsa from 1254 to 1256, Sal, a clergyman, who was provost of the Dömös monastery from 1256 to 1295, and an unidentified sister, who married local nobleman Ant Lőrinte from Zala County.

== Career ==
He was first mentioned as a royal squire (or youth) in 1273 which suggests he was much more younger than his brothers Thomas and Sal. When the Austrian and Moravian troops of Ottokar II invaded the borderlands of Hungary in April then autumn 1273, Atyusz was among the defenders of fort Detrekő (today ruins in Plavecké Podhradie, Slovakia), unsuccessfully besieged by Ottokar. For his merits, Atyusz was appointed ispán of Veszprém County in early 1274, holding the dignity throughout the year. Historian János Karácsonyi claimed Atyusz already served in this position in 1273. In December 1274, he was transferred to Zala County, but functioned in this capacity only a few days. For unknown reasons, Atyusz lost all political influence for the next decade. On 6 March 1278, a local noble John Bő in Somogy County filed a lawsuit against Atyusz before the court of ispán Denis Péc and his cousin Gregory Péc in Somogyvár. According to his charges, Atyusz unlawfully seized his village Csavonya and robbed his servants in Őr (both villages laid along the border with Zala County). The subsequent court at Segesd on 25 March, chaired by Denis' successor Peter Csák ruled in the favor of John based on an evidentiary procedure.

Nevertheless, Atyusz remained a loyal supporter of Ladislaus IV of Hungary, who donated the village Pacsa (separating it from the castle of Zala) to him in 1283. Sometime after, Nicholas, the ispán of Zala County determined the borders of his estate. In 1291, Atyusz handed over Pacsa to his nephew John Lőrinte (the son of Ant Lőrinte and his Atyusz's unidentified sister). Atyusz regained his political status by 1288, during the late reign of Ladislaus IV, when he served as ispán of Somogy County. In that year, he bought Oltárc from his cousin Buzád IV Hahót for 50 marks.

When Andrew the Venetian, crossing the Austrian border, arrived to Hungary at the beginning of 1290 as a pretender to the throne, Atyusz was among the noblemen who joined his escort. Andrew III was crowned king on 23 July, after the assassination of Ladislaus IV. As loyal to the crown, Atyusz was appointed ispán of Vas County in 1291, however his dignity was purely nominal as the powerful Kőszegi family ruled de facto independently the western parts of Transdanubia by then. The Kőszegis rose up in open rebellion against Andrew in spring 1292, acknowledging Charles Martel of Anjou, as King of Hungary. Atyusz participated in that royal campaign which subdued the rebellion by July, but his fort of Buzádsziget was seized by the Kőszegi troops. In addition, Ivan Kőszegi captured and imprisoned Andrew during his journey to Slavonia in August. Atyusz was among those loyal barons and nobles who sent their relatives as hostages to the Kőszegis to liberate Andrew III. Atyusz sent his only son John II who was born from his first marriage. Atyusz also lost his nominal ispánate, unilaterally usurped by Ivan Kőszegi.

Atyusz remained a loyal supporter of Andrew and the royal family in the following turbulent years. Upon Andrew's request, his mother, Tomasina Morosini, moved to Hungary in 1293 to administer Croatia, Dalmatia, and Slavonia. Atyusz belonged to her innermost circle and served as count of the Queen Mother's court in 1296. In this capacity, Andrew III donated two queenly villages to Atyusz. He was last mentioned by sources in 1302, surviving Andrew's death and the extinction of the Árpád dynasty. He died by 1310. His son John became the first member of the Szabari noble family, adopting the surname after his village Szabar which already owned by Buzád III in the 1230s. His daughter Elizabeth married Osl (II) Ostfi.

== Sources ==
- Karácsonyi, János (1901). A magyar nemzetségek a XIV. század közepéig. II. kötet [The Hungarian genera until the middle of the 14th century, Vol. 2] (in Hungarian). Hungarian Academy of Sciences.
- Zsoldos, Attila (1999). "Két hamis oklevélről [Two Fake Documents]". Történelmi Szemle (in Hungarian). 41 (1–2). Hungarian Academy of Sciences: 191–208. ISSN 0040-9634.
- Zsoldos, Attila (2005). Az Árpádok és asszonyaik. A királynéi intézmény az Árpádok korában [The Árpáds and their Women: The Institution of Queenship in the Era of the Árpáds] (in Hungarian). MTA Történettudományi Intézete. ISBN 963-8312-98-X.
- Zsoldos, Attila (2011). Magyarország világi archontológiája, 1000–1301 [Secular Archontology of Hungary, 1000–1301] (in Hungarian). História, MTA Történettudományi Intézete. ISBN 978-963-9627-38-3.

Atyusz Genus Hahót Born: ? Died: after 1302
Political offices
Preceded by Michael Csák	Ispán of Veszprém; 1274	Succeeded by Stephen Rátót
Preceded by Dedalus	Ispán of Zala; 1274	Succeeded by Denis Péc
Preceded by Makján Aba	Ispán of Somogy; 1288	Succeeded by Nicholas Kőszegi
Preceded by Ivan Kőszegi	Ispán of Vas; 1291–1292	Succeeded by Ivan Kőszegi
