= Hahold I Hahót =

12th-century German–Hungarian knight

Hahold (I) Hahót
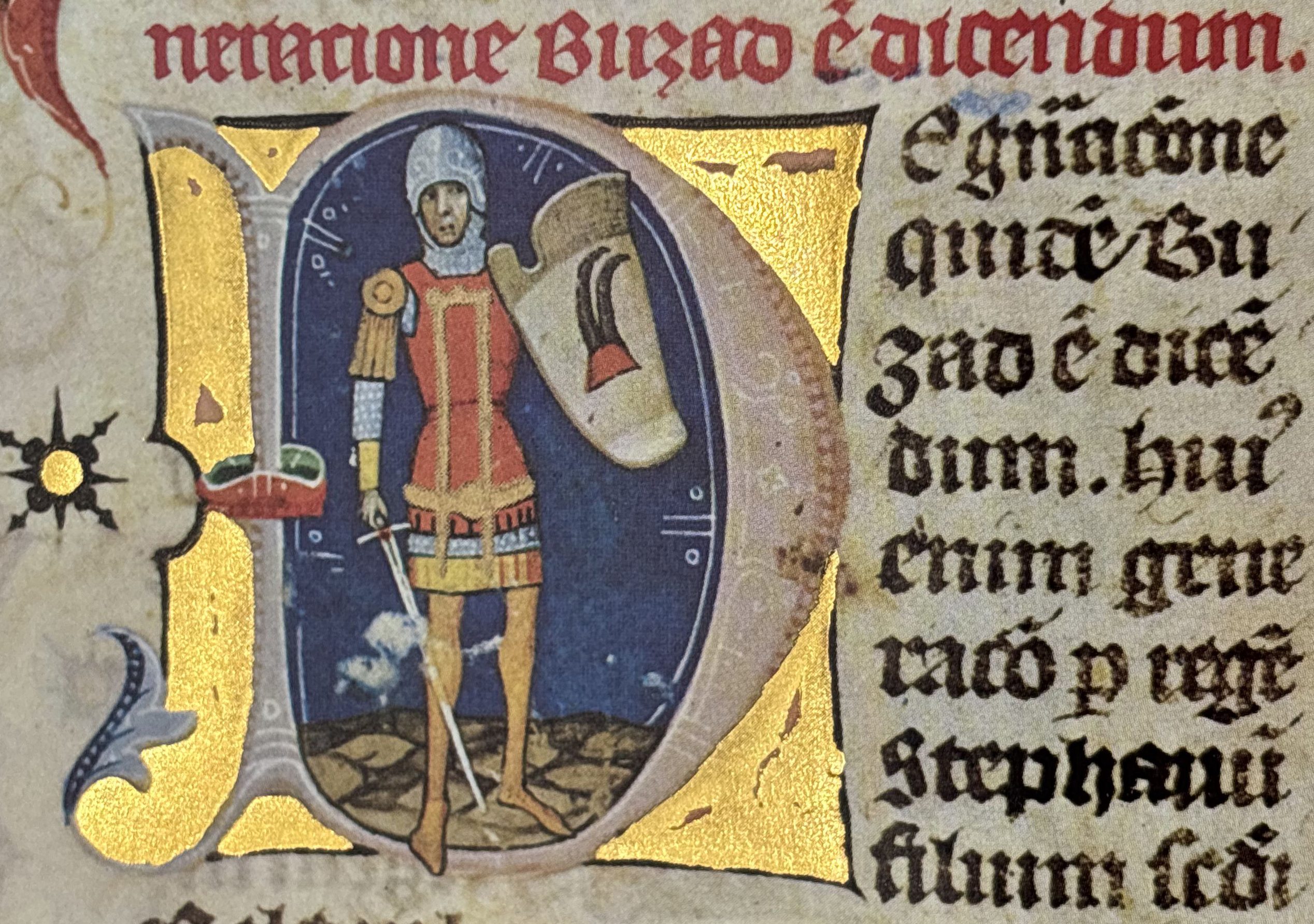
- Hahold as depicted in the Illuminated Chronicle with false coat of arms
- Noble family: gens Hahót
- Issue: Buzád I Hahold II

Hahold (I) from the kindred Hahót (Hungarian: Hahót nembeli (I.) Hahót), also known as Hahold the Great (Latin: Magnus Hahold), was a 12th-century German mercenary knight possibly from Thuringia who settled down in the Kingdom of Hungary. Promoting to the Hungarian nobility, he became the first member of the gens Hahót, thus he was also the forefather of the late medieval powerful Bánfi de Alsólendva family.

== Origin ==
As the 14th-century Illuminated Chronicle narrates the origin of the gens Hahót (or Buzád),

This clan was brought into Hungary by King Stephen, son of Bela II, in order to aid the said king. They are sprung from the counts of Orlamund. The first to come was called Hadolch, whose son was called by the like name of Hadolch and also Arnold. From them sprang Banus Buzad. The people of this country could not pronounce Hadolch, and so he was called by the similar name of Hohold. The clan of Chak conspired with some other clans against the King; it is said that they were defeated by Hohold and by the army which he had brought with him.

— Illuminated Chronicle

The Illuminated Chronicle preserved the narrative of the so-called gesta of the age of King Stephen V of Hungary (r. 1270–72), compiled by magister Ákos, who wrote Hahold was a descendant of the Counts of Weimar-Orlamünde. The first member of the family was Otto I, Margrave of Meissen, who ruled the territory in the 1060s. Historian Elemér Mályusz argued the family was familiar to chronicler Ákos, because King Béla I's daughter Sophia was engaged to Margrave William, Otto's brother in 1062, then she married their nephew Ulric. Ákos also wrote the original name of Hahold (or Hahót) was Hadolch but the Hungarian nobles could not pronounce it correctly during his arrival to the realm.

Ladislaus the Cuman's chronicler Simon Kézai referred to the Hahót kindred as "Buzad autem generatio de Mesn originem trahit, nobiles de districtu Wircburg" in his significant work, the Gesta Hunnorum et Hungarorum (1280s). Historian János Karácsonyi identified Wircburg as Marburg in March of Styria (today Maribor, Slovenia), while Mesn was identical with the nearby Messendorf, he claimed. Mályusz rejected Karácsonyi's theory and identified the two geographical names with Wartburg and Meissen in Thuringia (Margravate of Meissen), noting that none of them were part of the estates of the House of Weimar-Orlamünde, which ruled Meissen from 1046 to 1067. Endre Tóth tried to reconstruct the origin of the kindred based on the spread of the name Hahold in German-speaking areas. Near Freising, the name was relatively frequently used since the 8th century, in addition, it appeared altogether with the name Arnold in the 13th century, which was also used for four generations in the Hahót kindred.

== Arrival to Hungary ==
When Stephen III was crowned King of Hungary in early June 1162, shortly after the death of his father, Géza II, his two uncles, Géza's brothers, Ladislaus and Stephen, who had joined the court of the Byzantine Empire, challenged his right to the crown. Soon Manuel I Komnenos launched an expedition against Hungary to support Ladislaus II. After his sudden death, his younger brother Stephen IV succeeded him. The Illuminated Chronicle, based on Ákos' chronicler, wrote Hahold came to Hungary in early 1163 at the invitation of King Stephen in order to provide assistance to crush the rebellion of the Csák kindred who supported his namesake rival. As the description ("son of Béla II") fits to the anti-king Stephen IV, historian Gyula Pauler argued Hahold was a partisan for the elder Stephen (IV) in the throne fight against his nephew (Stephen III) who fled to Austria. To eliminate the inconsistency between Hahold's German-origin and the Byzantine-sponsored Stephen, he claimed Hahold already settled in Hungary during the late reign of Géza II.

Both János Karácsonyi and Elemér Mályusz rejected this approach. They argued, Hahold and his troops took part in the defeat of the rebellious Stephen IV in 1163, who took assistance from some clans, includings the Csáks, in addition to the Byzantine Empire. Accordingly, during his brief exile in Austria, Stephen III could rely not only on the increased number of his followers against his unpopular uncle, but also on the assistance of mercenary knights recruited in Germany, including Hahold, whose army successfully routed the Csáks and destroyed Csákvár, their fort. Mályusz also added if Hahold was invited to Hungary by Stephen IV who was decisively defeated in the Battle of Székesfehérvár on 19 June 1163, he would not have been able to keep the gained estates, in addition to integrate into the Hungarian nobility. In contrast, Endre Tóth considers the Hahóts' settlement and defeating the Csáks as two separate events, and the latter one only marked the Hahóts' first prominent presence in national politics.

Nevertheless, after Stephen III's victory over his uncle and the Byzantine Empire, Hahold stayed in Hungary and received land donations and settled down in Zala County near the Austrian border. Hahót, named after Hahold and his kindred (which later usually called as de genere Buzad after his influential grandson, Buzád II) became their centre, where his grandson, Arnold I (magister Ákos incorrectly referred to him as Hahold I's son, omitting Buzád I and Hahold II) founded the family monastery of the kindred, dedicated to Saint Margaret, in the first trimester of the 13th century. It is also possible that Hahold already owned Pölöske, later seat of his clan's Arnold branch. In addition to the Csányi (or Csány), Szabari, Söjtöri and Hahóti kinships, the powerful Bánfi de Alsólendva noble family, which flourished until 1645, descended from Hahold. The very last male descendant of Hahold's kindred was László Csány, who was executed for his role in the Hungarian Revolution of 1848.

== Sources ==
- Makk, Ferenc (1989). The Árpáds and the Comneni: Political Relations between Hungary and Byzantium in the 12th century (Translated by György Novák). Akadémiai Kiadó. ISBN 963-05-5268-X.
- Mályusz, Elemér (1971). Az V. István-kori geszta [The Gesta of the Age of Stephen V] (in Hungarian). Akadémiai Kiadó.
- Tóth, Endre (2003). "Hoholt – Hahót: A jövevény nemzetségek eredetéhez [Hoholt – Hahót: On the Origin of the Foreign Kindreds]". Századok (in Hungarian). 137 (2). Magyar Történelmi Társulat: 265–296. ISSN 0039-8098.
- The Hungarian Illuminated Chronicle: Chronica de Gestis Hungarorum (Edited by Dezső Dercsényi) (1970). Corvina, Taplinger Publishing. ISBN 0-8008-4015-1.
