= Buzád Hahót =

The Blessed Buzád Hahót, OP
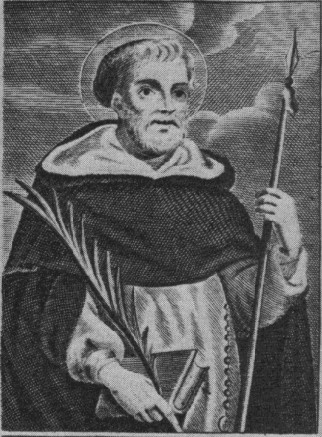

Martyr
- Born: c. 1180
- Died: April 1241; Pest, Kingdom of Hungary
- Venerated in: Roman Catholic Church
- Feast: 13 November
- Patronage: Politicians

Buzád II Hahót
- Ban of Severin
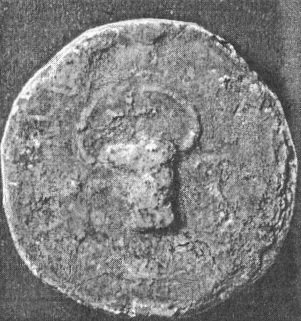
- Seal of Buzád II Hahót, before 1232
- Reign: 1226–c. 1232
- Successor: Lucas
- Noble family: gens Hahót
- Issue: Buzád III, Csák I, Tristan, Lancelot Hahót
- Father: Buzád I

Buzád II Hahót, O.P., also Buzád the Great or Buzád the Elder (Hungarian: Hahót nembeli (II.) Buzád, Latin: Magnus Buzad; c. 1180 – April 1241), was a Hungarian nobleman and soldier, who was the first known Ban of Severin. He later gave up his position in society and entered the Dominican Order.

Buzád was killed during a Mongol invasion of his homeland, and is now honored as a martyr by the Catholic Church, for which he has been beatified and is also known as "Blessed Buzád" (Hungarian: Boldog Buzád).

== Ancestry and family ==
[...] They are sprung from the counts of Orlamund. The first to come was called Hadolch, whose son was called by the like name of Hadolch and also Arnold. From them sprang Banus Buzad. The people of this country could not pronounce Hadolch, and so he was called by the similar name of Hohold. [...]

— Illuminated Chronicle

Buzád was born into the Buzád branch of the Hahót clan, the son of Buzád I (died 1192). According to magister Ákos, the founder of the Hahót kindred was Buzád's grandfather, a certain German knight Hahold I, who himself was a descendant of the Counts of Weimar-Orlamünde and settled down in the Kingdom of Hungary in 1163 upon the invitation of Stephen III of Hungary to fight against his usurper uncle Stephen IV of Hungary and his allies, the Csáks. Buzád's brother was Arnold I (died c. 1234), who erected the family monastery at Hahót. Buzád had four sons from his unidentified wife: Buzád III (his presumptive heir, who, however, predeceased his father around November 1239), Csák I, Voivode of Transylvania, Tristan and Lancelot. The two latter names represent the spread of chivalric culture in the Hungarian elite, specifically the Hahót kindred.

== Career ==
According to a non-authentic charter, Buzád served as the Ispán (comes) of Győr County in 1209. There is no record of him receiving any official positions for the coming two decades. In authentic contemporary records, Buzád and his (unidentified) descendants were first mentioned in 1215, when a certain knight of the queen's court, Wilermus, sold his lands between the Mura and Drava rivers for 200 marks to them. In 1217, King Andrew II of Hungary commissioned Buzád to determine the borders of those lands which he had donated to the cathedral chapter of Zagreb in that donation letter. According to a late 17th-century family tree of his kindred, Buzád participated in the first phase of the Fifth Crusade (1217–18), led by King Andrew II, albeit the anonymous author confused his name with the name of his grandfather and clan founder Hahold, but the rest of the data is the same as his life path.

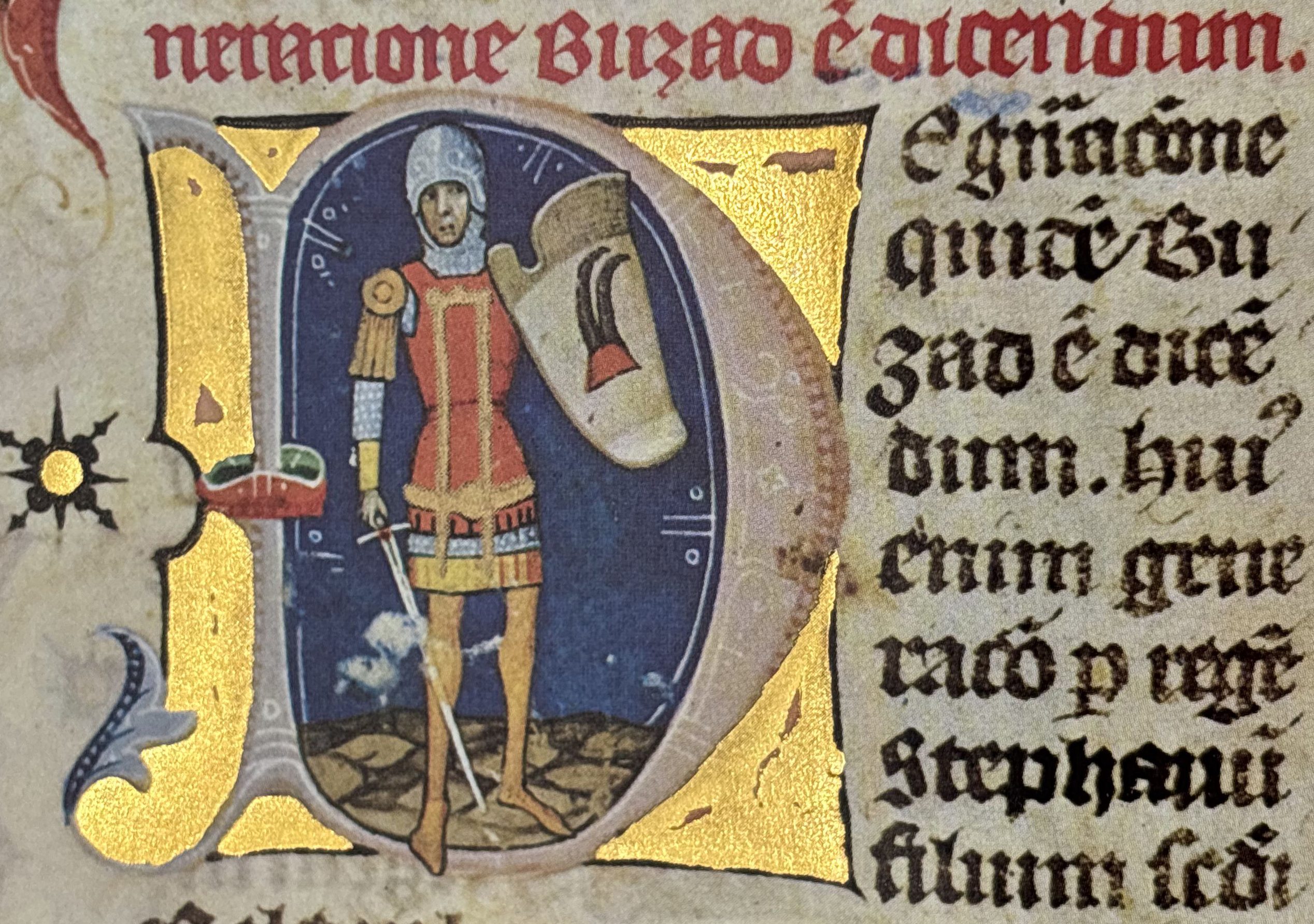
There is speculation that this miniature of Illuminated Chronicle depicts Buzád, instead of his grandfather Hahold I, who most historians assume

He functioned as the Ispán of Bihar County in 1222. He was dismissed from his position, when a group of discontented barons staged a coup d'état in the spring of 1222. Following their failure, Buzád was the head of Pozsony County between 1222 and 1224. During that time there were emerging tensions between King Andrew II and his son, Béla. The latter rebelled against his father's rule, who was forced to share his realms with his heir. Buzád became a supporter of Béla, as a result of which he had to follow his lord into exile to Austria in 1223 (he already resided in Vienna in December of that year). In February 1224, Pope Honorius III sent a letter to Buzád – still referred to with the title Ispán of Pozsony –, acknowledging his splendid allegiance to Duke Béla, risking his wealth and other goods and the dangers to which he was exposed by it. On the same day, the pope wrote to King Andrew II, warning him not to harm the property of Buzád and the other lords, who took refuge at the court of Duke Leopold VI with Béla. After reconciliation between father and son, Buzád returned to Hungary in the spring of 1224, and became the Ispán of Vas County in 1225, which then belonged to the Duchy of Slavonia, the realm of Béla.

Buzád served as the Ban of Severin from 1226 to c. 1232, when Béla governed Transylvania de facto independently from the king, holding the title of Duke of Transylvania. In 1233, Buzád called himself "former ban" (Latin: quondam banus) in a charter; as a result former archontological and genealogical works of Hungarian historians (e.g. János Karácsonyi and Mór Wertner) referred to him as the Ban of Slavonia (1226–1228/9). Nevertheless it is more likely that Buzád held the office of Ban of Severin, because of his close relationship with Béla, and there is also reason to believe he came into contact during that period with the Dominican friars, who were engaged in proselytizing among the Cuman people. Contrary to this, Romanian historian Sorin Forțiu claimed Buzád actually served as Ban of Slavonia, as he is perhaps identical with that office-holder with the "B" initial letter in his name, who was referred to by Duke Béla in his charter issued on 26 May 1224 at Toplica, just after his return to Slavonia. Forțiu argued that the former publishers of the original diploma have misinterpreted the text, considering the abbreviation as a omission. According to this theory, he held the dignity relatively for a short time in the first half of 1224, between the terms of Solomon Atyusz and Michael, son of Ampud. By 1228, Duke Béla's supporters took power in the royal council after another wave of dissatisfaction against Andrew's rule. The king was forced to authorize his son to revise his previous land grants throughout Hungary. Without referring to specific dignity, Ban Buzád appeared as a member of the royal council along with several other partisans of Béla – for instance, Mojs and Denis Tomaj – in that year.

Alongside his cousin, Michael Hahót, Buzád appeared as a witness in the so-called Kehida Diploma of 1232, where the royal servants of Zala County urged King Andrew II of Hungary to recognise their verdict as compulsory, because Atyusz III Atyusz refused to give back the land of Wezmech to the Diocese of Veszprém. Buzád served as Ispán of Sopron County in 1232. For this reason historian Attila Zsoldos considered that Buzád left Béla's court to return Andrew's loyalty by that year.

== Monastic life ==
Buzád came from the most powerful Bánfi family [sic] in Hungary. He had grown up when he was trespassing his riches and fame, and he left his rank on his sons, and with great enthusiasm he commenced a monastic life in the Dominican order. As he gained experience in secular sciences, he soon became a tireless propagator of God's Word. When the Tartars [Mongols] broke into Hungary, and they perished the servants of God with exceptional cruelty, the Prior commanded their monks to flee, but Buzád did not care about the threat to his life, asking him to let stay and console the Christian people. He was so persistently asking for his [the Prior] permission, that he could stay. After his companions were in safe, Buzád set out to die for Christ and encouraged the people to do the same. When the Tatars' troops were nearby, the handful of flocks were blessed [by Buzád] with glorious intentions of the glorious death endured for Christ. He himself in the church, as if in a crucifixion, prayed with prowess at the altar. So he offered himself for an entirely burnt sacrifice, and he was killed on 8 December 1243 [sic]. After the barbarians retreated, the returning brothers found his beheaded corpse, which was pierced with spears, and they mourned him very. One brother had mourned Buzád for three days, while he did not take food and drink, when he was astonished, and heard the mourned martyr say to him, "Did not Christ have to suffer before entering his glory? The sufferings of the present time are not proportionate to the future glory. " The brother was no longer mourned for that, but rejoiced.

— Gábor Hevenesi: Ungaricae Sanctitatis Indicia (1692)

Around 1233, Buzád joined the Dominican Order, giving up his political career and forsaking all property. As a charter dated 14 February 1233 mentioned, he already lived in a monastery at Pest. Then his eldest son Buzád III inherited his main estate and centre Szabar. According to tradition narrated by a contemporary chronicler Thomas of Cantimpré, not willing to leave the monastery, the invading Mongols killed Buzád before the altar in the middle of April 1241, shortly after the disastrous Battle of Mohi. Buzád was beatified by the Roman Catholic Church because of his martyrdom and self-sacrifice. The narration of his martyrdom was preserved by Jesuit scholar and theologian Gábor Hevenesi at the end of the 17th century in his work Ungaricae Sanctitatis Indicia (1692).

== Honors ==
In honor of Hahót, a wooden sculpture was erected in 2009 at Hahót, Zala County, which village was founded by his clan. The lifesize statue depicts the noble, with one hand holding a sword and a Latin cross in the other, referring to his secular and ecclesiastical careers. László Vigh, a member of the Hungarian National Assembly, gave a speech during consecration, where he said the youth should follow persons who lived out their lives with God's love and honest work, instead of false role models. A lookout at Zajk Hill near Letenye ("Boldog Buzád Kilátó"), designed by Imre Makovecz and constructed after his death, is also dedicated to him.

== Sources ==
- Forțiu, Sorin (2020). "Magnus Buzad, primul ban de Severin (~1228–'30)? [Magnus Buzad, the first banus of Severin (~1228–'30)?]". In Forțiu, Sorin (ed.). ArheoVest, Nr. VIII: In Honorem Alexandru RĂDULESCU, Interdisciplinaritate în Arheologie și Istorie, Timişoara, noiembrie 2020 (Vol 1–2.) (in Romanian). JATE-Press Kiadó. pp. 727–785. ISBN 978-963-315-464-9.
- Kurcz, Ágnes (1988). Lovagi kultúra Magyarországon a 13–14. században [Chivalric Culture in Hungary in the 13–14th Centuries] (in Hungarian). Akadémiai Kiadó. ISBN 963-05-4737-6.
- Markó, László (2006). A magyar állam főméltóságai Szent Istvántól napjainkig: Életrajzi Lexikon [Great Officers of State in Hungary from King Saint Stephen to Our Days: A Biographical Encyclopedia] (in Hungarian). Helikon Kiadó. ISBN 963-208-970-7.
- Tantalics, Béla (2009). A Bánffy család szellemi hagyatéka [The Intellectual Legacy of the Bánffy Family] (in Hungarian). Lenti Honismereti Egyesület. ISBN 978-963-06-5372-5.
- Vándor, László (1996). "Boldog Buzád. Gondolatok középkorkutatásunkról, kulturális emlékeinkről az egyetlen és méltatlanul elfeledett középkori zalai szent kapcsán [Blessed Buzád. Thoughts on our Medieval Research, Cultural Monuments in connection with the only and undeservedly forgotten Medieval Saint of Zala County]". Pannon Tükör (in Hungarian). 1 (1): 48–50. ISSN 1219-6886.
- Zsoldos, Attila (2011). Magyarország világi archontológiája, 1000–1301 [Secular Archontology of Hungary, 1000–1301] (in Hungarian). História, MTA Történettudományi Intézete. ISBN 978-963-9627-38-3.
- Zsoldos, Attila (2016). "Béla erdélyi herceg bárói [The Barons of Béla, Duke of Transylvania]". In Dáné, Veronika; Lupescu-Makó, Mária; Sipos, Gábor (eds.). Testimonio litterarum. Tanulmányok Jakó Zsigmond tiszteletére (in Hungarian). Erdélyi Múzeum Egyesület. pp. 441–449. ISBN 978-606-739-054-4.

Buzád II Genus Hahót Born: ? Died: April 1241
Political offices
Preceded by first known	Ban of Severin; 1226–c. 1232	Succeeded by Lucas
