= Tristan Hahót =

Hungarian noble

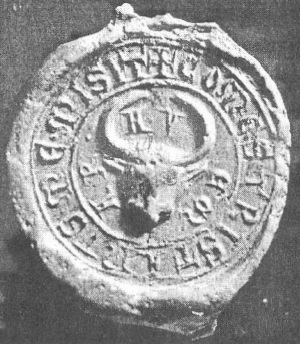
- Seal of Tristan Hahót, 1255

Count of the Heralds
- Reign: 1255
- Predecessor: unknown
- Successor: Pobor (?)
- Died: after 1267
- Noble family: gens Hahót
- Issue: Michael III; John I
- Father: Buzád II

Tristan from the kindred Hahót (Hungarian: Hahót nembeli Trisztán or Terestyén; died after 1267) was a Hungarian noble, who served as Count of the Heralds (Hungarian: hirdetőispán; Latin: comes preconum) in 1255.

== Biography ==
Tristan was born into the Buzád branch of the gens Hahót as the son of powerful baron Buzád II Hahót, who later entered the Dominican Order, and after his murder by invading Mongols, now he is considered as a Christian martyr by the Catholic Church. Tristan had three brothers: Buzád III, Csák I and Lancelot (Lankrét). Tristan had two sons from his unidentified spouse, including Michael III, who became patron of the Premonstratensian monastery at Rajk in 1275, receiving the right from the sons of Csák I.

His typarium is one of the most notable examples of seal usage of aristocrats in medieval Hungary. He inherited his seal from his father, depicting head of an ox, while Tristan added letters to his seal in order to distinguish himself from his distant relatives, the Arnold branch of the clan. In order to protect his possessions at Muraköz (today: Međimurje, Croatia), he built a timber fortification, and the nearby village was still called as Terestyéntornya (lit. "Tristan's Tower") in the 15th century.

== Sources ==
- Karácsonyi, János (1901). A magyar nemzetségek a XIV. század közepéig. II. kötet [The Hungarian genera until the middle of the 14th century, Vol. 2] (in Hungarian). Hungarian Academy of Sciences.
- Körmendi, Tamás (2009). "A magyarországi nemzetségi címerek kialakulásának kérdéséhez". Századok (in Hungarian). 143 (2). Magyar Történelmi Társulat: 391–426. ISSN 0039-8098.
- Zsoldos, Attila (2011). Magyarország világi archontológiája, 1000–1301 [Secular Archontology of Hungary, 1000–1301] (in Hungarian). História, MTA Történettudományi Intézete. ISBN 978-963-9627-38-3.

Tristan Genus Hahót Born: ? Died: after 1267
Political offices
Preceded by unknown	Count of the Heralds; 1255	Succeeded by Pobor (?)
