= Jakab Cseszneky =

Hungarian aristocrat

Bearer of the sword
- Reign: 1263
- Predecessor: Csák Hahót
- Successor: Pál Cseszneky
- Noble family: House of Cseszneky
- Father: Michael Bána

Jakab Cseszneky de Csesznek et Visk was a Hungarian aristocrat and first Lord of Csesznek in the 13th century.

Jakab was the son of Mihály, member of the clan Bána, and equerry of Andrew II of Hungary.

He became the swordbearer of the King Béla IV and held also the title Count of Trencsén. About 1263 he constructed the famous gothic Castle of Csesznek in the Bakony mountains. Jakab Cseszneky and his descendants have been called after the castle: Cseszneky.

His wife was the daughter of Mark I, member of the clan Csák. His sons, Miklós, Lőrinc, Szomor and Mihály were important supporters of the Kings Ladislaus IV of Hungary and Charles I of Hungary and fought bravely against Máté Csák III, the powerful Hungarian feudal lord. After his death, his widow married Lőrinte II Lőrinte, ancestor of the Essegvári family.

== Sources ==
- Györffy György: Az Árpád-kori Magyarország történeti földrajza
- The castle of Csesznek
- Szilágyi Sándor: A Magyar Nemzet Története

Jakab House of Cseszneky Born: ? Died: ?
Political offices
Preceded by Csák Hahót	Bearer of the sword 1263	Succeeded by Pál Cseszneky
Preceded by Peter Káta	Master of the cupbearers 1269	Succeeded by Philip Kórógyi
Preceded by Maurice	Judge royal disputed 1276	Succeeded by Denis Péc
