= James Hahót =

Hungarian noble

Master of the stewards for Queen Dowager Elizabeth
- Reign: 1280
- Predecessor: first known
- Successor: Mark Péc
- Died: between 1301 and 1309
- Noble family: gens Hahót
- Spouse: Anne Tengerdi
- Issue: Elizabeth
- Father: Panyit

James from the kindred Hahót (Hungarian: Hahót nembeli Jakab; died between 1301 and 1309) was a Hungarian noble, who served as Master of the stewards for Queen Dowager Elizabeth in 1280.

== Biography ==
James was born into the gens Hahót as the son of notorious criminal Panyit, who became infamous for his violent actions and plundering raids against neighboring estates in the 1250s and 60s. He had a sister, who married Reynold Básztély. James married Anne Tengerdi, a niece of Bishop Theodore Tengerdi. They had a daughter Elizabeth, spouse of George Zákányi.

He was first mentioned by a contemporary record in 1267. During his youth, James took part in his father's raiding campaigns against the surrounding lands in Zala County. For instance, he was present when the Hahót troops pestered and invaded the adjacent estates in June 1269, and brutally murdered local noble Gregory Andi and his son.

After the death of Stephen V of Hungary, James joined the court of Queen Dowager Elizabeth the Cuman, who served as de jure Regent for his minor son, Ladislaus IV of Hungary until 1277. After that Elizabeth became Duchess of Macsó and Bosnia, and ruled over the southern territories. In her service, James successfully besieged and captured the forts Novak in Virovitica County and Páka in Požega County in the spring of 1280. The enemy's identity and the circumstances are uncertain, nevertheless the siege occurred, when Philip, Bishop of Fermo, the papal legate arrived to Hungary, causing a civil disorder between Ladislaus IV and some magnates. For his merits, James was appointed Master of the stewards in the court of Elizabeth around May 1280.

By 1285, his relationship with Elizabeth had deteriorated and became tense. The Queen accused James as responsible for emerging feud with her son, Ladislaus IV. As a result, she confiscated Kálmáncsa in Somogy County from James, who, in response, murdered tárnok Paul, a financial official, who was entrusted to take back the land for the royal crown in 1286. His troops also plundered and destroyed the estate. He was pardoned by Queen Elizabeth in 1288. James Hahót was last mentioned as a living person in 1301. He died by 27 March 1309.

== Sources ==
- Karácsonyi, János (1901). A magyar nemzetségek a XIV. század közepéig. II. kötet [The Hungarian genera until the middle of the 14th century, Vol. 2] (in Hungarian). Hungarian Academy of Sciences.
- Zsoldos, Attila (2011). Magyarország világi archontológiája, 1000–1301 [Secular Archontology of Hungary, 1000–1301] (in Hungarian). História, MTA Történettudományi Intézete. ISBN 978-963-9627-38-3.

James Genus Hahót Born: ? Died: 1300s
Political offices
Preceded by first known	Master of the stewards for Elizabeth the Cuman; 1280	Succeeded by Mark Péc
