= Nicholas III Hahót =

Hungarian noble and landowner

Nicholas (III) Hahót
- Died: 1291
- Noble family: gens Hahót
- Father: Arnold II

Nicholas (III) from the kindred Hahót (Hungarian: Hahót nembeli (III.) Miklós; died 1291) was a Hungarian noble and landowner, whose rebellion against the newly crowned Stephen V of Hungary in 1270 was a dress rehearsal for the era of feudal anarchy lasted until the 1320s, and also caused the 1271 war between Hungary and Bohemia.

== Biography ==
Nicholas III was born into the gens Hahót as one of the two sons of Arnold II, who served as Palatine of Hungary for a short time in 1242. His younger brother was Arnold III, who was still minor during Nicholas' rebellion in 1270.

His pre-rebellion career is unknown, but he owned Purbach (Hungarian: Feketeváros) in Sopron County. It is plausible that Nicholas was a loyal supporter of Béla IV of Hungary who was forced to cede the territories of the Kingdom of Hungary east of the river Danube to Stephen, which caused a civil war lasting until 1266. After Béla's death, when Stephen V succeeded his father without difficulties, Nicholas refused to attend the coronation ceremony took place on or after 17 May 1270. Instead, according to a later charter issued by Stephen V, he invited "German" (Styrian) knights from Friedberg into his seat, Pölöske, Zala County, and took an oath of allegiance to Ottokar II of Bohemia, long-time enemy of the Árpád dynasty. The document says, his soldiers in alliance with Styrian troops continuously pillaged and ravaged the surrounding lands from the fort of Pölöske.

In November 1270, Stephen V sent a royal army under the command of ispán Michael, son of Aladar to capture Pölöske and crush Nicholas' rebellion. However the Hahót and Styrian troops, who rushed out the castle, routed the Hungarian army, killing its commander Michael and his brother. In those weeks, King Stephen resided in Vas County to reconcile his late father's old partisans, including Henry Kőszegi and the Geregye brothers, and appoint royal castellans to the border forts due to the threat of war with Bohemia. Formerly, in October, he also met Ottokar II near Pressburg (present-day Bratislava, Slovakia), where they concluded a truce. However Stephen's intention to avoid confrontation was thwarted by Nicholas Hahót's insurgency. It is possible that the intention to appoint royal castellans to the castles laid along the border, including Pölöske, provoked Nicholas' opposition, who may have feared that his castle would be confiscated for the crown on the grounds of border protection. Local castle warriors in Vas County resisted against the Styrian incursions. George Sálköveskúti captured Peter Sahi, an important ally of Nicholas Hahót. Simultaneously, Rubinus Hermán and his troops clashed with the knights of Friedberg, capturing one of their commanders Solchar. After the rebellion was crushed within days by late November, Nicholas escaped from Zala County and sought refuge in the court of Philip Türje, the Archbishop of Esztergom. Stephen V confiscated the estate of Purbach from Nicholas and donated to his loyal soldier Panyit Miskolc, who succeeded Michael, son of Aladar as ispán of Zala County and in this capacity, played a key role in overcoming Nicholas' revolt.

Historian Attila Zsoldos argued the rebellion of Nicholas Hahót and its suppression resulted that, instead of peaceful conciliation, several Transdanubian lords, for instance Henry Kőszegi and Nicholas Geregye, following the new monarch's sister, Anna of Macsó, fled Hungary and handed over their castles in Vas County, along the western borders to Ottokar II. Then Stephen V, who saw the power machinations and aspirations of Ottokar behind Hahót's revolt, launched a plundering raid into Styria around December 1270.

Nicholas Hahót resided in Esztergom until the death of Stephen V in August 1272. When the former rebellious lords, including Kőszegi returned from Bohemia to support the rule of the minor Ladislaus IV of Hungary, Nicholas was also pardoned and recovered Purbach from Panyit Miskolc. After that, his name was rarely mentioned by contemporary records. In 1277, his troops plundered the adjacent Nick. He died in 1291. Towards the end of his life, he lost the ownership of Pölöske under unknown circumstances to Nicholas Kőszegi, as his brother and heir, Arnold III tried unsuccessfully to regain the castle in the following year.

== Sources ==
- Karácsonyi, János (1901). A magyar nemzetségek a XIV. század közepéig. II. kötet [The Hungarian genera until the middle of the 14th century, Vol. 2] (in Hungarian). Hungarian Academy of Sciences.
- Rudolf, Veronika (2023). Közép-Európa a hosszú 13. században [Central Europe in the Long 13th Century] (in Hungarian). Arpadiana XV., Research Centre for the Humanities. ISBN 978-963-416-406-7.
- Szűcs, Jenő (1993). Az utolsó Árpádok [The Last Árpáds] (in Hungarian). História, MTA Történettudományi Intézete. ISBN 963-8311-96-7.
- Zsoldos, Attila (2007). Családi ügy: IV. Béla és István ifjabb király viszálya az 1260-as években [A family affair: The Conflict between Béla IV and Junior King Stephen in the 1260s] (in Hungarian). História, MTA Történettudományi Intézete. ISBN 978-963-9627-15-4.
