= Bearer of the sword (Hungary) =

The bearer of the sword or sword-bearer (Hungarian: kardhordó, Latin: ensifer) was one of the minor officials of the royal household in the Kingdom of Hungary.

== List of known office-holders ==
Term	Incumbent	Monarch	Notes
1233	Alexander	Andrew II	son of Mojs
1256–1257	Csák	Béla IV	gens Hahót; also ispán of Gora ispánate
1263	Jacob	Béla IV	gens Bána; ancestor of the House of Cseszneky
1267	Paul	Béla IV	gens Bána; brother of Jacob
1293	Csák	Andrew III	gens Csák; brother of Matthew III Csák

=== Bearer of the sword for the prince ===
Term	Incumbent	Crown Prince	Notes
1269	Stephen	Stephen	gens Dorozsma

== Sources ==
- (in Hungarian) Zsoldos, Attila (2011). Magyarország világi archontológiája, 1000–1301 ("Secular Archontology of Hungary, 1000–1301"). História, MTA Történettudományi Intézete. Budapest. ISBN 978-963-9627-38-3
