= Csák II Hahót =

Csák (II) Hahót

Bearer of the sword
- Reign: 1256–1257
- Predecessor: Alexander, son of Mojs
- Successor: Jacob Bána
- Born: Unknown
- Died: after 1308
- Noble family: gens Hahót
- Issue: Csák III
- Father: Csák I

Csák (II) from the kindred Hahót (Hungarian: Hahót nembeli (II.) Csák; died after 1308) was a Hungarian noble, who served as bearer of the sword (Hungarian: kardhordó, Latin: ensifer) between 1256 and 1257. He was the ancestor of the Csányi noble family.

He was born into the Buzád branch of the gens (clan) Hahót as the son of voivode Csák I. He held the position of head of Gora ispánate (part of Zagreb County) in 1256. From 1256 to 1257, he functioned as bearer of the sword, which was a minor office in the royal court of Béla IV of Hungary (meanwhile his father was the master of the treasury). Csák II served as ispán (comes) of Vrbas County between 1266 and 1269.

His father built the fort Csáktornya (today Čakovec, Croatia) in the late 1250s. However Ottokar II of Bohemia then the increasing powerful Kőszegi family captured the clan's all castles in the following years, causing the Buzád branch's move into Center Zala. Csák II settled down in Csány (today Zalacsány) after Ottokar's invasion, possibly he was that family member who built the local Zsidóvár ("Zsidó Castle"). The Csányi family (lit. "of Csány") ascended from there.

Csák II functioned as master of the treasury for Elizabeth the Cuman, the widow of Stephen V of Hungary in 1286. He was still alive in 1308.

== Sources ==
- Vándor, László (1994). "A Hahót–Buzád nemzetség birtokközpontjainak kialakulása Zala vármegyében (az alsólendvai vár keletkezésének körülményei [The Emergence of Seats of the Hahót–Buzád Kindred (The Circumstances of the Erection of Lendava Castle]". In Göncz, László (ed.). Lendava – Lendva. Študije o zgodovini Lendave – Tanulmányok Lendva történelméből (in Hungarian). Magyar Nemzetiségi Művelődési Intézet. pp. 58–63.
- Zsoldos, Attila (2011). Magyarország világi archontológiája, 1000–1301 [Secular Archontology of Hungary, 1000–1301] (in Hungarian). História, MTA Történettudományi Intézete. ISBN 978-963-9627-38-3.

Csák II Genus Hahót Born: ? Died: after 1308
Political offices
Preceded by Alexander, son of Mojs	Bearer of the sword 1256–1257	Succeeded by Jacob Bána
