= List of feudal lords of Međimurje =

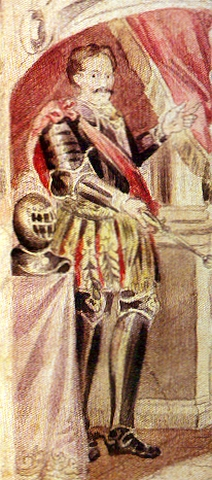
Hermann II, Count of Celje

This is a chronological list of feudal lords of Međimurje, a small historical and geographical region in northernmost part of Croatia, from the 13th century to 1923.

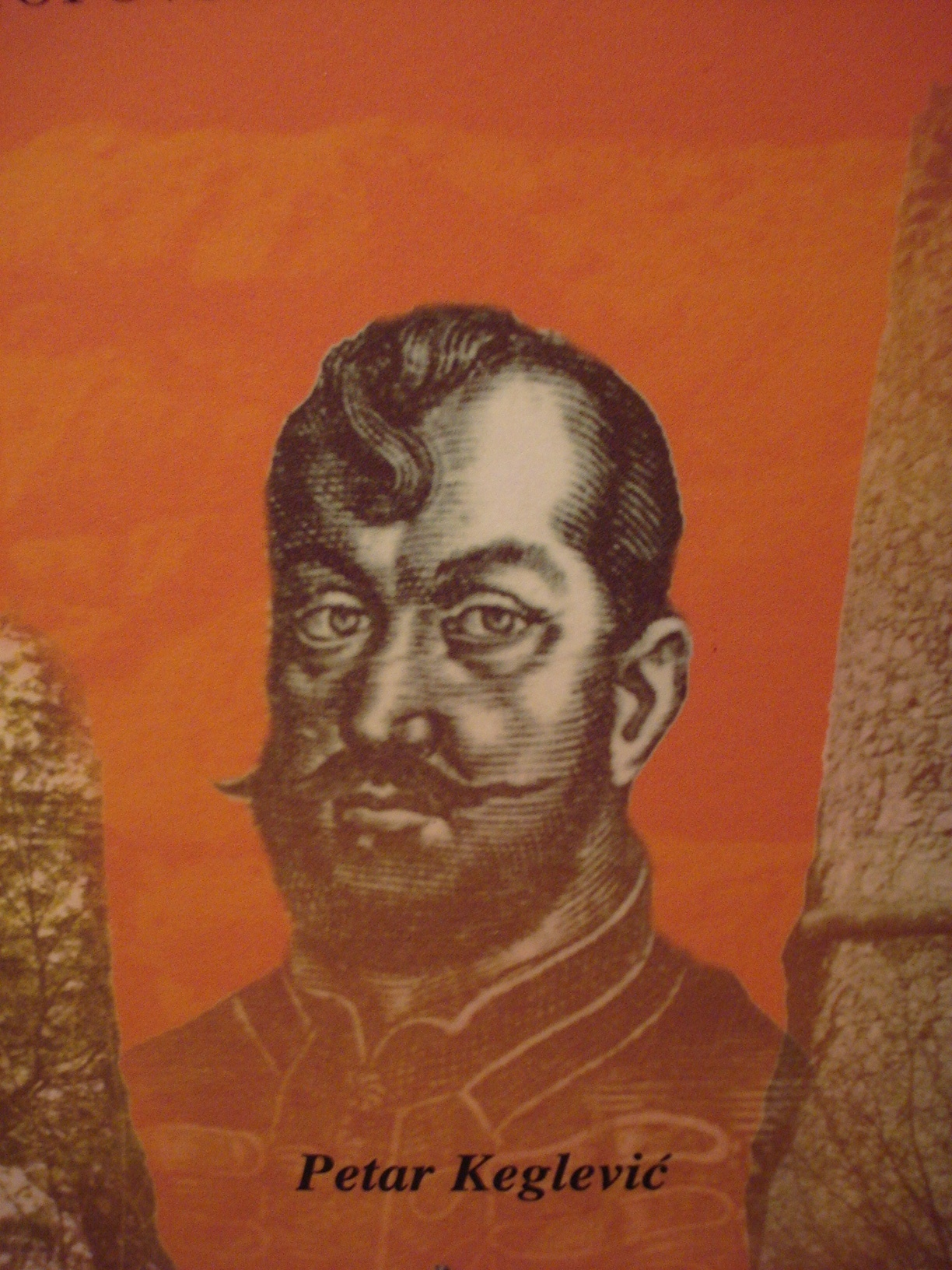
Petar Keglević

== Feudal lords of Međimurje from 13th century to 1540 ==
- Buzad-Hahold family (c.1200–c.1270?)
- Period of feudal wars (c.1270–c.1300)
- Ulric of Walsee (c.1300–1328)
- King Charles I Robert (1328–1342)
- King Louis the Angevin (1342–1350)
- Lacković (1350–1397)
- Szécsényi (1397–1404)
- Celjski (1405–1461)
- King Matija Korvin (1461–1464)
- Fridrik Lamberg (1464–1473)
- Ernušt (1473–1540)

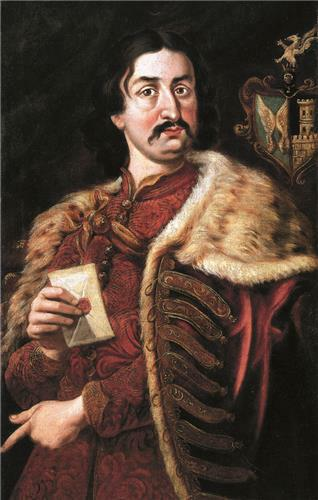
Petar Zrinski, Ban (Viceroy) of Croatia

== Feudal lords of Međimurje in the modern era (1540–1923) ==
- Petar Keglević (1540–1546)
- Zrinski (1546–1691)
- Hungarian Chamber (1691–1694)
- marquess Turinetti de Prye (1694–1702)
- King Charles III of Habsburg (1702–1715)
- Ivan Čikulin (1715–1719)
- Althann (1719–1791)
- Feštetić (1791–1923)

== See also ==
- List of prefects of Međimurje County
- List of noble families of Croatia
- Međimurje County Museum
- List of rulers of Croatia
