= Bána (genus) =

Genus (gens) Bána
- Country: Kingdom of Hungary
- Founded: 10th century (?)
- Cadet branches: House of Cseszneky

Bána (Bana) was the name of a gens (Latin for "clan"; nemzetség in Hungarian) in the Kingdom of Hungary. According to the tradition the Cseszneky family has descended from the Bána clan.

== History ==
The Clan Bána's origin - in György Györffy's opinion - traces back to the 10th century. Another notable historian, Erik Fügedi, suggested that the Clan Bána was a collateral branch of the Clan Katapán (Koppán) descending from the princely house of the Pecheneg Talmat tribe. According to the medieval Gesta Hungarorum, Ketel Cuman (in fact Pecheneg or Kabar) khagan joined the people of Hungarian Grand Prince Álmos at Kiev in 884 CE. After the conquest of Hungary, one part of Ketel's clan settled down between Sátorhalom and Tolcsva river, whilst the other part where the Vág river falls into the Danube. At the bank of Vág Ketel's son, Alaptolma constructed the castle of Komárom, where later they were buried in a Pagan way. Other historians think that the relationship between the Katapáns and the Bánas was not agnatic rather matrilineal, and the Bánas descended from the Counts of Bana, who were vassals of the Avar Tudun, and as such subvassals of Charlemagne. The Clan Bána had its primeval estates around Bana village and in the Bakony mountains. They were hereditary Wildgraves of Bakony.

The direct forefather of the Cseszneky family, Count Apa from the Clan Bána, is mentioned in a document from 1230. In accordance with this record, Pope Gregory IX investigated the complaint of Pannonhalma Abbey, because Count Apa and his son, Jakab had occupied the Benedictines' possessions and fishing places around Gönyű. Another son of Apa, Mihály was mentioned in 1225 as King Andrew II's equerry, and later he rendered great service to King Béla IV during the Mongol invasion. Mihály's son, another Jakab, who was royal swordbearer and lord of Trencsén Castle, constructed Csesznek Castle around 1260. He and his descendants took the name Cseszneky after their ancestral home.
