= Sukoró =

- Location of Fejér county in Hungary

- Location of Sukoró
- Coordinates: 47.24086°N 18.60096°E
- Country: Hungary
- County: Fejér

Area
  - Total: 16.27 km^{2} (6.28 sq mi)

Population (2017)
  - Total: 1,511
  - Density: 92.87/km^{2} (240.5/sq mi)
- Time zone: UTC+1 (CET)
  - Summer (DST): UTC+2 (CEST)
- Postal code: 8096
- Area code: 22
- Motorways: M7
- Distance from Budapest: 49.2 km (30.6 mi) Northeast
- Website: www.sukoro.hu

Sukoró is a village in Fejér county, Hungary.

== History ==
Sukoró was originally referred to as Sokoró in documents in 1270. In preparation for the Battle of Pákozd, Lajos Kossuth held a war council meeting in a Calvinist Church in Sukoró on September 28.
