= Zalaszabar =

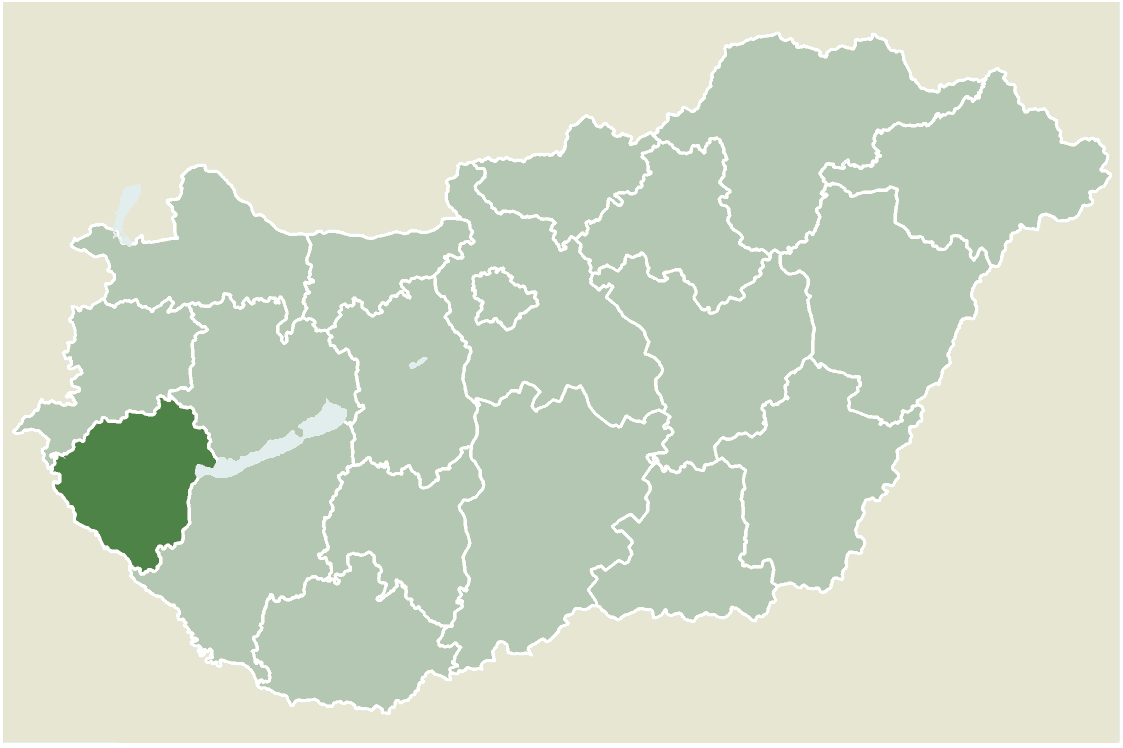
- Location of Zala county in Hungary

- Location of Zalaszabar
- Coordinates: 46.64093°N 17.10548°E
- Country: Hungary
- County: Zala

Area
  - Total: 16.95 km^{2} (6.54 sq mi)

Population (2004)
  - Total: 605
  - Density: 35.69/km^{2} (92.4/sq mi)
- Time zone: UTC+1 (CET)
  - Summer (DST): UTC+2 (CEST)
- Postal code: 8743
- Area code: 93

Zalaszabar is a village in Zala County, Hungary.
