= Prefection =

Royal prerogative in the Kingdom of Hungary

Prefection, also promotion of a daughter to a son (Hungarian: fiúsítás; Latin: praefectio in filium), was a royal prerogative in the Kingdom of Hungary, whereby the sovereign granted the status of a son to a nobleman's daughter, authorizing her to inherit her father's landed property and transmitting noble status to her children even if she married a commoner. Such a daughter was called a praefecta in Latin.

== History ==
The first prefection occurred in 1332, when King Charles Robert granted this status to Margaret Gersei. The Gersei family sided with the king during the early, tumultuous years of his reign, when he had to defeat the local oligarchs to consolidate his rule. The family was murdered by the Kőszegi oligarch family in 1316, with the exception of Margaret, who was saved by her nurse and was later married to Paul Magyar, a supporter of the king. Louis the Great, the son of Charles Robert, continued to grant this status to noble daughters who were married to his loyal supporters, thereby redistributing the lands of the old aristocracy among the families on whose support he could count. Overall about 100 cases of prefection were recorded until 1526 (when most of Hungary fell to the Ottoman Empire and central rule became destabilized).

In literature, prefection plays a role in the second part of János Arany's famous Toldi trilogy − both Toldi's beloved, Piroska Rozgonyi, and his niece, Anikó are granted praefecta status by Louis the Great.

== See also ==
- Daughters' quarter
- Suo jure, "in her own right", of a noble title held by a woman

== Sources ==
- Engel, Pál (2001). The Realm of St Stephen: A History of Medieval Hungary, 895–1526. I.B. Tauris Publishers. ISBN 1-86064-061-3.
- Fügedi, Erik (1998). The Elefánthy: The Hungarian Nobleman and His Kindred (Edited by Damir Karbić, with a foreword by János M. Bak). Central European University Press. ISBN 963-9116-20-3.
- Rady, Martyn (2000). Nobility, Land and Service in Medieval Hungary. Palgrave. ISBN 0-333-80085-0.
