= Csák I Hahót =

Hungarian noble

Csák (I) Hahót
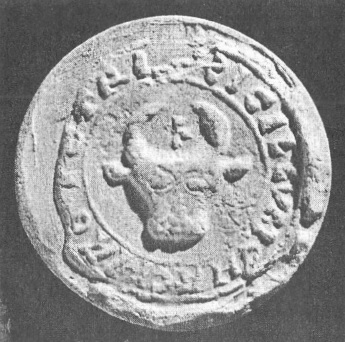
- Seal of Csák I Hahót, 1268

Voivode of Transylvania
- Reign: 1261
- Predecessor: Ernye Ákos
- Successor: Ladislaus Kán
- Born: Unknown
- Died: after 1269
- Noble family: gens Hahót
- Issue: Csák II
- Father: Buzád II

Csák (I) from the kindred Hahót (Hungarian: Hahót nembeli (I.) Csák; died after 1269) was a Hungarian noble who held several secular positions during the reign of King Béla IV. Initially, he was a strong and influential supporter of the king's son, Duke Stephen, later returned to Béla's allegiance.

== Biography ==
He was born into the Buzád branch of the gens (clan) Hahót as the son of Buzád II, who served as ban of Severin between 1226 and c. 1232. Csák had three brothers. His father was killed by the Mongols in Pest after the disastrous Battle of Mohi. Csák I had five sons, including Csák II, from an unidentified wife.

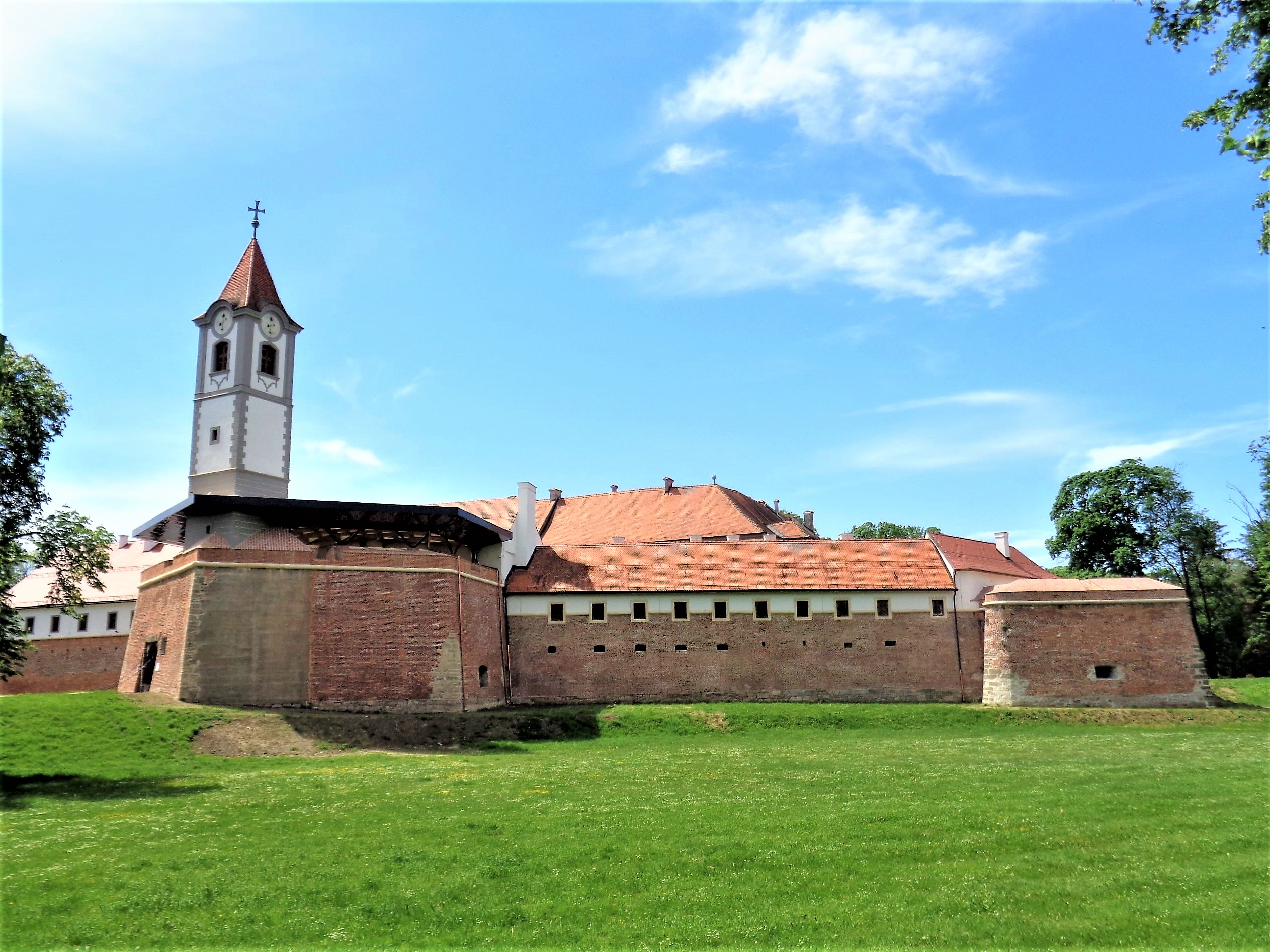
The castle of Čakovec, Croatia, town founded by Csák

His name was first mentioned by a document in 1234. Albeit that charter proved to be a 14th-century forgery, its genealogical details are correct, which suggested he was born around 1215. He functioned as master of the horse from 1245 to 1247. Besides that he also served as ispán (comes) of Baranya County in 1245. Csák was the ispán of Sopron County between 1247 and 1254. According to a non-authentic charter he also held that office until 1260 or 1265 (depends on the uncertain date). As ispán, he owned the lands of Wulkaprodersdorf (Vulkapordány), Rohrbach (Fraknónádasd), Eggendorf, Hidegség and Homok, nearby the town of Sopron. Historian Melinda Tóth claimed Hidegség functioned as Csák's manorial seat, when held the office of ispán in Sopron County. Tóth also argued, the mural paintings (frescos) in the rotunda of Hidegség, which is an important artistic heritage from the 13th century in Hungary, were made under the financial support of Csák.

Csák was appointed master of the treasury by king Béla IV in 1248 and filled the office until 1259. In addition, he also functioned as ispán of Zala County between 1256 and 1259. In this capacity, he founded a Premonstratensian monastery in Rajk, dedicated to Blessed Virgin Mary. Alongside Ban Stephen Gutkeled, Palatine Roland Rátót and Benedict II, Archbishop of Esztergom, he participated in peace talks with the envoys of Ottokar II of Bohemia over the issue of Styria in April 1254 in Buda, representing Béla. Csák and his castle warriors took part in the suppression of the Styrian nobles and ministeriales in the same year. He fought in the siege of Pettau Castle (today Ptuj, Slovenia) in June or July 1258. When Stephen was made Duke of Styria in 1258, two neighboring counties – Vas and Zala – were transferred to the newly occupied province. Thus ispán Csák became Stephen's subject. Csák was granted the forts of Hoheneck and Miltenberg along with a village Sachsenfeld (present-day Žalec, Slovenia) near Celje, all of them were formerly possessed by Berthold von Treun, a leading participant of the Styrian revolt. When Rostislav Mikhailovich invaded Bulgaria with Hungarian assistance in 1259, Duke Stephen entrusted Csák to lead the Hungarian auxiliary troops consisted of knights from Zala County (for instance, Torda, son of George). A year later, Csák successfully defended the fort of Lockenhaus (Léka) against Bohemian troops. After the Battle of Kressenbrunn in July 1260, Béla IV was forced to renounce of Styria in favor of Ottokar II. Regarding the latter, there are also arguments that the siege of Léka took place in 1253 or 1254, as a Bohemian counter-attack around the same, when Béla IV invaded Moravia.

During that time there were emerging tensions between Béla IV and his son, Stephen, who returned to Transylvania and started to rule it for the second time as Duke of Transylvania after 20 August 1260. Csák gradually became an ardent admirer of Stephen, who dismissed voivode Ernye Ákos from that position and replaced him with Csák I Hahót. His proper title was "ban of Transylvania" (Latin: banus Transilvanus). Historian Gyula Kristó suspected deliberateness behind that unusual title (Ernye also bore that before Csák). Kristó argues Duke Stephen wanted to ensure to Transylvania a high degree of autonomy, like in Croatia and Slavonia. He also served as ispán of Szolnok County, which office was united with the voivodeship from that time. Before that Csák already held important offices in the royal court of Stephen: he was master of the cupbearers (1259) and master of the treasury (1260) for the duke. He also functioned as ispán of Zala County (Western Hungary) in 1260, which fact gives rise to uncertainty regarding his career, because around that time the hostility between father and son, who dominated the eastern part of the country turned into open war. Historian Attila Zsoldos considered Csák left the ducal court and swore allegiance to Béla, when a civil war lasting until 1266 broke out between father and son.

After the Battle of Isaszeg in March 1265, the king was forced to accept the authority of Stephen at Transylvania. On 23 March 1266, father and son confirmed the peace in the Convent of the Blessed Virgin on the 'Rabbits' Island. During that time Csák became a noble in the king's court again. He served as ispán of Zala County (1265–1268). According to Zsoldos, Csák was one of the barons, who advocated another war against Duke Stephen, but the mobilized royal servants in Esztergom refused their participation in 1267. Throughout the first half of the year 1268, Csák stayed in Zala County, where he functioned as ispán, where acted as arbiter in a series of lawsuits, which reviewed the ownership of several possessions in the county. One of the articles of the Decree of 1267 ordained that "the lands of the nobles, which thou art ours, the peoples of the queen's free villages, or the courtiers, or the castle folks, are occupied or kept occupied under any pretext, must be returned to these nobles". By the second half of 1268, Csák moved to Veszprém County with the same mandate. He served as ispán of Nyitra County in 1269.

His property in Sopron County was divided between his sons according to a business contract in 1274, implying that Csák's death occurred not long before.

== Legacy ==
In order to protect his possessions at Muraköz (today: Međimurje, Croatia) in Slavonia, he built a timber fortification, establishing the foundation of Csáktornya (lit. means "Csák's Tower"), which later administratively belonged to Zala County (today: Čakovec, Croatia).

== Sources ==
- Engel, Pál (1996). Magyarország világi archontológiája, 1301–1457, I. [Secular Archontology of Hungary, 1301–1457, Volume I] (in Hungarian). História, MTA Történettudományi Intézete. ISBN 963-8312-44-0.
- Engel, Pál (2001). The Realm of St Stephen: A History of Medieval Hungary, 895-1526. I.B. Tauris Publishers. ISBN 1-86064-061-3.
- (in Hungarian) Markó, László (2006). A magyar állam főméltóságai Szent Istvántól napjainkig – Életrajzi Lexikon ("The High Officers of the Hungarian State from Saint Stephen to the Present Days – A Biographical Encyclopedia") (2nd edition); Helikon Kiadó Kft., Budapest; ISBN 963-547-085-1.
- Rudolf, Veronika (2023). Közép-Európa a hosszú 13. században [Central Europe in the Long 13th Century] (in Hungarian). Arpadiana XV., Research Centre for the Humanities. ISBN 978-963-416-406-7.
- (in Hungarian) Szűcs, Jenő (1984). "Az 1267. évi dekrétum és háttere. Szempontok a köznemesség kialakulásához [The Decree of 1267 and its Background. Aspects for the Formation of the Lower Nobility]". In H. Balázs, Éva; Fügedi, Erik; Maksay, Ferenc (eds.). Mályusz Elemér emlékkönyv. Társadalom- és művelődéstörténeti tanulmányok (in Hungarian). Akadémiai Kiadó. pp. 341–394. ISBN 963-05-3272-7.
- (in Hungarian) Tóth, Melinda (1976). "Buzád-nemzetségbeli Csák soproni ispán (1246–1254)." In: Soproni Szemle, Vol. XXX Issue 3. pp. 194–210. ISSN 0133-0748
- (in Hungarian) Zsoldos, Attila (2007): Családi ügy - IV. Béla és István ifjabb király viszálya az 1260-as években (A Family Affair - The Conflict of Béla IV and Junior King Stephen in the 1260s); História - MTA Történettudományi Intézete. Budapest. ISBN 978-963-9627-15-4.
- (in Hungarian) Zsoldos, Attila (2011). Magyarország világi archontológiája, 1000–1301 ("Secular Archontology of Hungary, 1000–1301"). História, MTA Történettudományi Intézete. Budapest. ISBN 978-963-9627-38-3

Csák I Genus Hahót Born: ? Died: after 1269
Political offices
Preceded by Stephen Gutkeled	Master of the horse 1245–1247	Succeeded by Ernye Ákos
Preceded by Denis Türje	Master of the treasury 1248–1259	Succeeded by Maurice Pok
Preceded by Ernye Ákos	Voivode of Transylvania; 1261	Succeeded by Ladislaus Kán
