= Nick, Hungary =

Village in Vas, Hungary

Nick
- Location of Vas county in Hungary

- Location of Nick, Hungary
- Coordinates: 47.40314°N 17.01469°E
- Country: Hungary
- County: Vas

Area
  - Total: 11.4 km^{2} (4.4 sq mi)

Population (2004)
  - Total: 564
  - Density: 49.47/km^{2} (128.1/sq mi)
- Time zone: UTC+1 (CET)
  - Summer (DST): UTC+2 (CEST)
- Postal code: 9652
- Area code: 95
- Motorways: M86
- Distance from Budapest: 185 km (115 mi) East

Nick (Hungarian pronunciation: [nit͡sk]) is a village in Vas county, Hungary.
