= Hahót, Zala =

Hahót
- Village
- Flag Coat of arms

- Location of Hahót
- Coordinates: 46.64851°N 16.92279°E
- Country: Hungary
- Region: Western Transdanubia
- County: Zala
- District: Nagykanizsa

Area
  - Total: 39.01 km^{2} (15.06 sq mi)

Population (1 January 2025)
  - Total: 904
  - Density: 23.2/km^{2} (60.0/sq mi)
- Time zone: UTC+1 (CET)
  - Summer (DST): UTC+2 (CEST)
- Postal code: 8771
- Area code: (+36) 93
- Website: hahot.hu

Hahót is a village in Zala County, Hungary.
