= Zala County (former) =

County of the Kingdom of Hungary

Zala County Comitatus Zaladiensis (Latin) Zala vármegye (Hungarian) Komitat Zala (German) Zalska županija (Croatian)
- County of the Kingdom of Hungary (11th century-1596, 1715-1946)
- Coat of arms

- Capital: Zalavár; Zalaegerszeg (1730-1946)
- Area
  - Coordinates: 46°51′N 16°51′E
  - 1910: 5,995 km^{2} (2,315 sq mi)
  - 1930: 4,877 km^{2} (1,883 sq mi)
- Population
  - 1910: 466,333
  - 1930: 365,266
- History
  - Established: 11th century
  - Merged to Zala-Somogy County: 1596
  - County recreated: 1715
  - Međimurje (Muraköz) to Croatia: 1850
  - Muraköz restored to Zala: 1860
  - Treaty of Trianon: 4 June 1920
  - Annexation of Muraköz and Muravidék: 11 April 1941
  - Monarchy abolished: 1 February 1946
- Today part of: Hungary (4,877 km^{2}) Croatia (729 km^{2}) Slovenia (389 km^{2})

Zala was an administrative county (comitatus) of the Kingdom of Hungary, bordered by the river Drave to the south. The territory of the former county is now divided between Hungary, Croatia and Slovenia. The capital of the county was Zalaegerszeg.

== Geography ==
Zala county shared borders with the Austrian land Styria and the Hungarian counties Vas, Veszprém, Somogy, Belovár-Körös and Varasd (the latter two in Croatia-Slavonia). The river Drava (Hungarian: Dráva) river formed its southern border, Lake Balaton its eastern border. The rivers Mura and Zala flowed through the county. Its area was 5974 km^{2} around 1910.

== History ==
Zala county arose as one of the first comitatus (counties) of the Kingdom of Hungary.

In 1850, shortly after the 1848 revolutions, the mostly Croatian-speaking area between the Mur and Drava rivers – the Međimurje region (Hungarian: Muraköz; German: Murinsel, lit. 'Mur island') – was transferred to the Habsburg Kingdom of Croatia; it was returned to Zala in 1860 and remained until 1918.

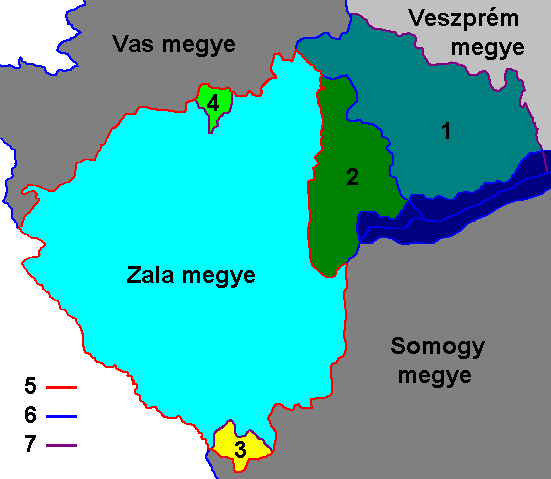
The formation of modern Zala County. (1) and (2) territories assigned from Zala County to Veszprém County in 1950. (2) territory reincorporated into Zala County in 1978. (3) territory assigned from Somogy County to Zala County in 1950. (4) territory assigned from Vas County to Zala County in 1950.

In 1920, by the Treaty of Trianon, the south-west of the county (the Međimurje region and southeastern parts of Prekmurje (Hungarian: Muravidék)) became part of the newly formed Kingdom of Serbs, Croats and Slovenes (from 1929 as Yugoslavia). The award recognised the 1918 occupation of Međimurje and 1919 occupation of Prekmurje. The remainder stayed in Hungary. The Yugoslavian part was occupied and annexed again by Hungary between 1941 and 1945 during World War II. In 1950, as part of the Communist reforms of local government, the county's borders were re-drawn again. A small part of former Vas county, north of Zalaegerszeg, went to Zala County. The part of Zala county north of Lake Balaton went to Veszprém County.

Since 1991, when Slovenia and Croatia became independent from Yugoslavia, most of Međimurje is part of Croatia (mostly in Međimurje County; Legrad is in Koprivnica-Križevci County); Razkrižje, Globoka and Prekmurje (the area around Lendava) is in Slovenia.

== Demographics ==
In 1900, the county had a population of 437,116 people and was composed of the following linguistic communities:

Total:

- Hungarian: 324,087 (74.1%)
- Croatian: 84,904 (19.4%)
- German: 4,917 (1.1%)
- Slovak: 218 (0.1%)
- Romanian: 159 (0.0%)
- Serbian: 13 (0.0%)
- Ruthenian: 2 (0.0%)
- Other or unknown: 22,816 (5.2%)

According to the census of 1900, the county was composed of the following religious communities:

Total:

- Roman Catholic: 402,773 (92.2%)
- Jewish: 13,967 (3.2%)
- Calvinist: 11,793 (2.7%)
- Lutheran: 8,251 (1.9%)
- Greek Catholic: 68 (0.0%)
- Greek Orthodox: 108 (0.0%)
- Unitarian: 32 (0.0%)
- Other or unknown: 124 (0.0%)

In 1910, the county had a population of 466,333 people and was composed of the following linguistic communities:

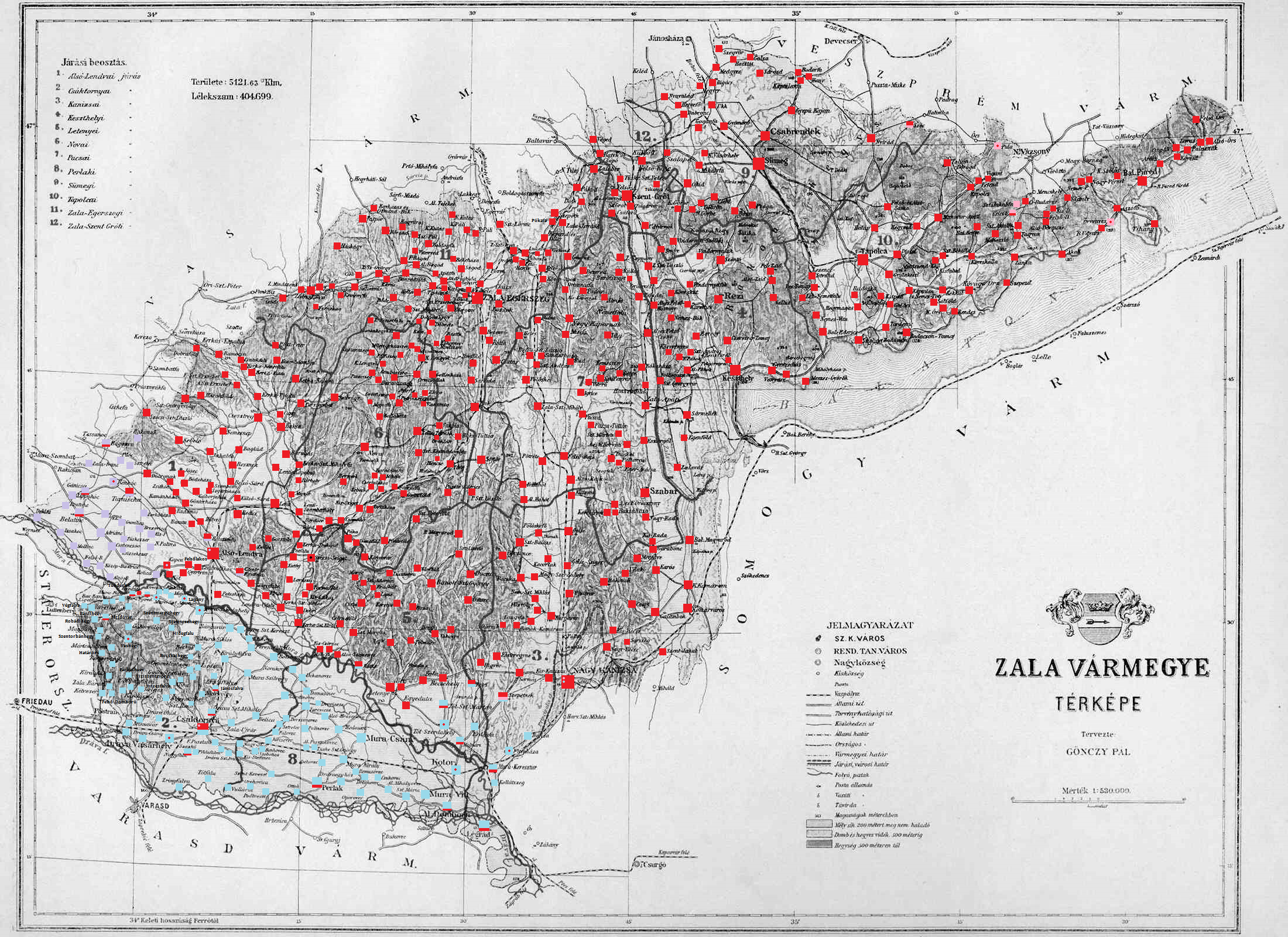
Ethnic map of the county with data of the 1910 census (see the key in the description).

Total:

- Hungarian: 347,167 (74.45%)
- Croatian: 91,909 (19.71%)
- German: 3,889 (0.83%)
- Slovak: 233 (0.05%)
- Serbian: 56 (0.01%)
- Romanian: 44 (0.01%)
- Ruthenian: 3 (0.0%)
- Other: 23,032 (4.94%) (Note: most of them (21,827) Prekmurje Slovene, called Wendish by the Hungarian authorities.)

According to the census of 1910, the county was composed of the following religious communities:

Total:

- Roman Catholic: 433,145 (92.88%)
- Jewish: 12,892 (2.76%)
- Calvinist: 11,738 (2.52%)
- Lutheran: 8,220 (1.76%)
- Greek Catholic: 117 (0.03%)
- Greek Orthodox: 110 (0.02%)
- Unitarian: 37 (0.01%)
- Other: 74 (0.02%)

== Subdivisions ==
In the early 20th century, the subdivisions of Zala county were:

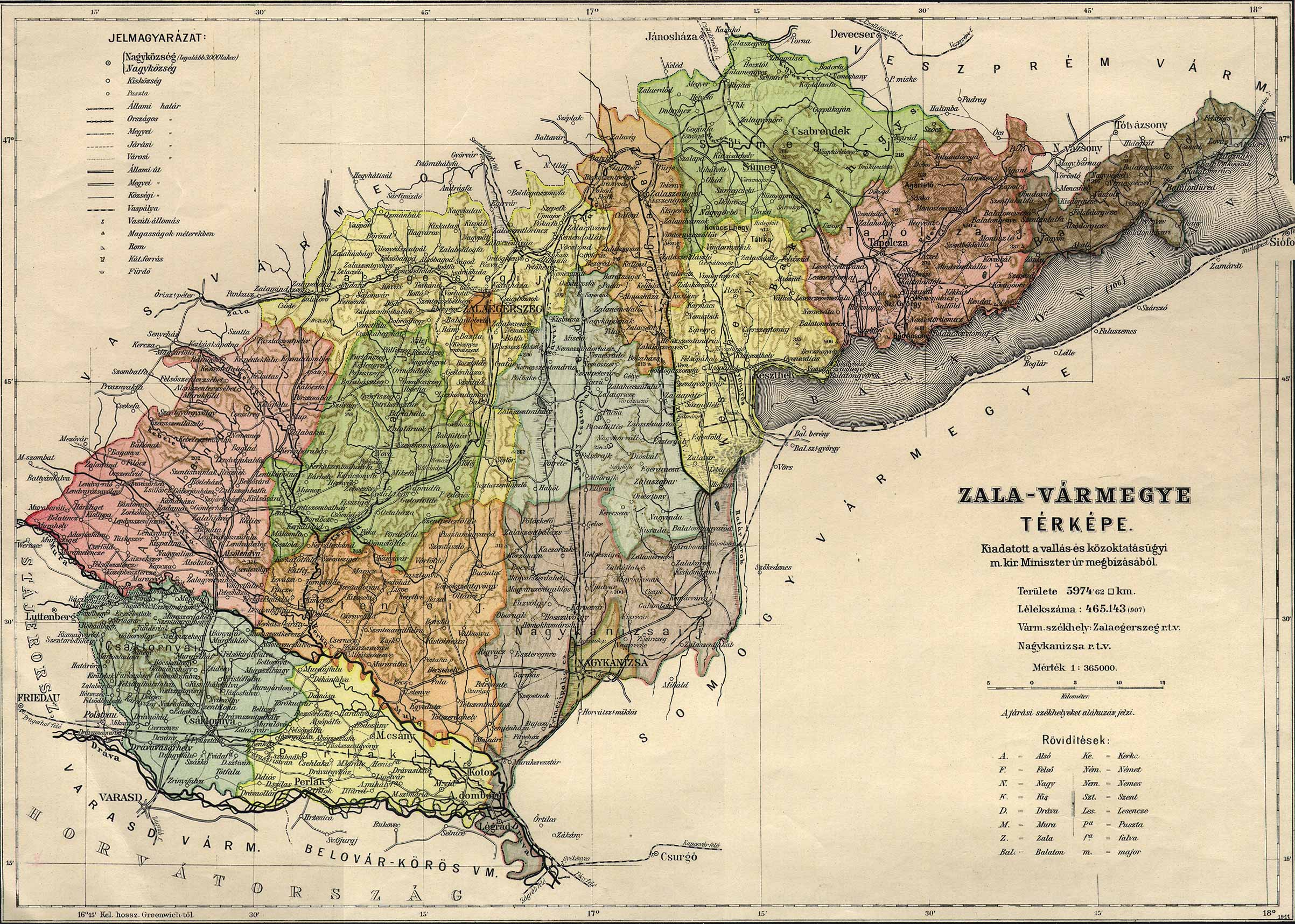

Districts (járás, plural járások)
District	Capital
Alsólendva	Alsólendva, SI Lendava
Balatonfüred	Balatonfüred
Csáktornya	Csáktornya, HR Čakovec
Keszthely	Keszthely
Letenye	Letenye
Nagykanizsa	Nagykanizsa
Nova	Nova
Pacsa	Pacsa
Perlak	Perlak, HR Prelog
Sümeg	Sümeg
Tapolca	Tapolca
Zalaegerszeg	Zalaegerszeg
Zalaszentgrót	Zalaszentgrót
Urban districts (rendezett tanácsú város)
Nagykanizsa
Zalaegerszeg

Today, the towns of Prelog and Čakovec are in Croatia; Lendava is in Slovenia.

=== Earlier subdivisions ===
In the early 19th century Zala County was divided into:

- Processus Lövőensis (Zalalövő)
- Processus Insulanus (Međimurje/Muraköz)
- Processus Egerszegiensis (Zalaegerszeg)
- Processus Kapornakiensis (Nagykapornak)
- Processus Szántóiensis
- Processus Tapoltzensis (Tapolca)

In 1854 Zala county (which at that time excluded Međimurje/Muraköz) comprised the following Stuhlbezirke (presented as they appear in the defining act):

1. Bánok-Sz.-György
2. Pácsa
3. Keszthely
4. Tapolcza
5. Sümegh
6. Kanizsa
7. Lendva
8. Zala-Egerszegh
