= Banica =

Banica may refer to:

== Places ==
=== Bulgaria ===
- Banitsa, Vratsa Province, Bulgaria

=== Dominican Republic ===
- Bánica, Dominican Republic

=== Greece ===
- Banitsa (ruins), the former village where Gotse Delchev was killed
- Symvoli, in the Serres regional unit, Macedonia
- Vevi, in Florina regional unit, Macedonia

=== North Macedonia ===
- Banica, North Macedonia

=== Philippines ===
- Banica, a district of Roxas City
- Banica, a river of the Philippines on Panay Island
- Banica, a river of the Philippines on Negros Island flowing through Dumaguete

=== Poland ===
- Banica, Gmina Sękowa, Lesser Poland Voivodeship
- Banica, Gmina Uście Gorlickie, Lesser Poland Voivodeship

=== Romania ===
- Banica, the Hungarian name for Bănița Commune, Hunedoara County, Romania

== Other uses ==
- Bănică, a Romanian surname
- Banitsa, a pastry from the Balkans
- Banovac, a Croatian coin used between 1235 and 1384
- One hundredth of an Independent State of Croatia kuna from 1941 to 1945
- Banica Conchita, a character portrayed by MEIKO from The Evillious Chronicles

== See also ==
- Banitsa (disambiguation)
- Banjica (disambiguation)
