= Banitsa (disambiguation) =

Banitsa (sometimes spelled Banica) may refer to:

- Banitsa, a pastry from the Balkans
- Banovac, a Croatian coin used between 1235 and 1384.
- one hundredth of an Independent State of Croatia kuna from 1941 to 1945

== Places called Banitsa ==
- Banitsa, Bulgaria, a village in Bulgaria
- Banica, North Macedonia, a village in the Strumica Municipality, North Macedonia
- Banica, Gmina Sękowa, a village in Lesser Poland Voivodeship, Poland
- Banica, Gmina Uście Gorlickie, a village in Lesser Poland Voivodeship, Poland
- Banița, a village in Săgeata Commune, Buzău County, Romania
- Bănița (Hungarian: Banica), a commune in Hunedoara County, Romania
- The Bănița River, a tributary of the Jiul de Est River in Romania
- the former name of Vevi, a village in northwestern Greece
- the former name of Symvoli, a village in northern Greece
- Banitsa (ruins), the former village in northern Greece where Gotse Delchev was killed

== See also ==
- Banica (disambiguation)
