= History of Croatian currency =

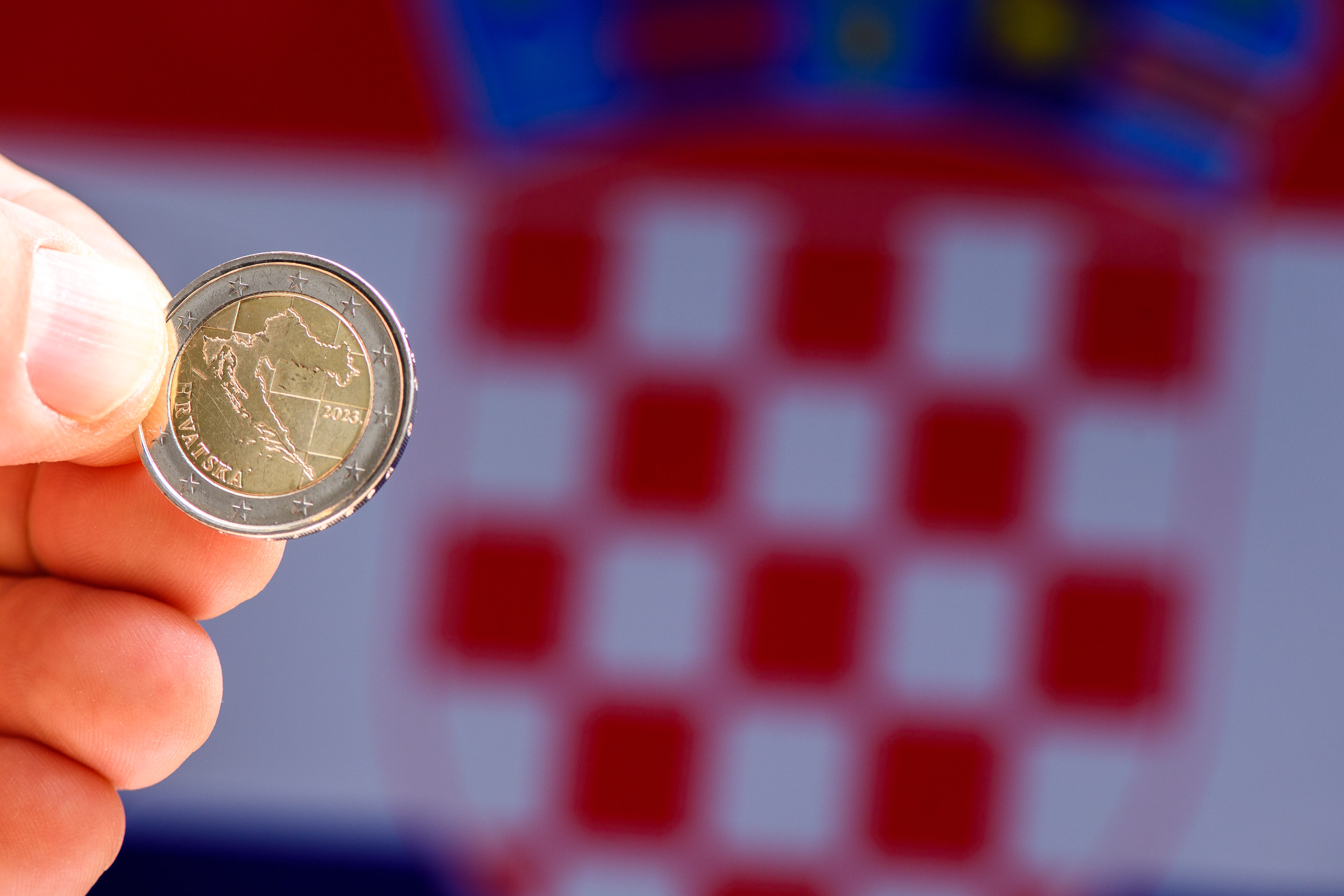
The Croatian euro has been in use since its 2023 introduction to the Eurozone.

The historic region of Croatia has used a variety of monetary currencies through its economic history. The nation's official currency has been the euro, since Croatia joined the Eurozone in 2023.

== Early history ==
The history of currency in the now Croatian territory dates to much earlier than the modern-day independence of Croatia, and almost a thousand years of history which has seen the rise and fall of many different empires and kingdoms.

Croats did not begin to create their own coins for currency until late in the 12th century (1100–1200). Previously, they minted replicas of Byzantine coins of emperor Heraclius. Byzantine coinage was adopted by Byzantine Empire in the 4th century (300–400) and was the currency standard for the empire for about 700 years.

== Middle Ages ==
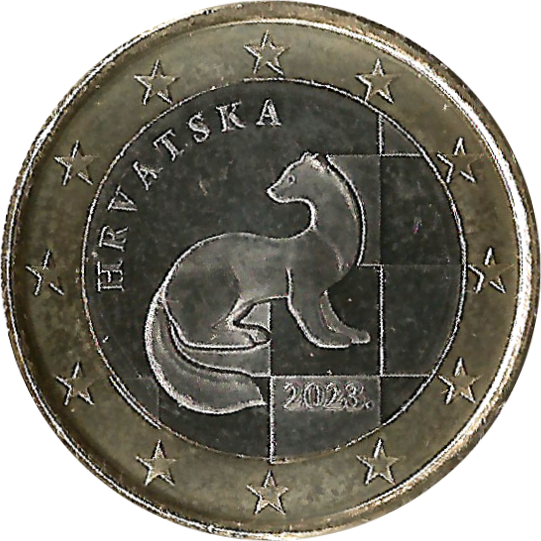
A Croatian euro depicting a marten as their pelts were used as early mediums of exchange.

The use of marten pelts, fox pelts and silk as means of paying tribute have been recorded in Dalmatian city-states in a 1018 document in the Republic of Venice. An Arabic travel writer Abu Hamid al-Gharnati recorded in 1154 that a "land of Slavs" near the Danube used actual marten pelts embroidered with royal markings as currency, but did not specify the exact extent of the territory; because he also separately described travels in Hungary proper, it is assumed today that he meant the areas known as Slavonia at the time, a southern part of the Kingdom of Hungary. The earliest record of the term marturina is dated to the end of the 12th century.

In the age of the Arpad dynasty, the Kingdom of Hungary started to mint silver coins called denar, including ones for the Kingdom of Slavonia. Andrew II of Hungary, at a time when he was the ruler of Slavonia (contemporary name for what is now most of continental Croatia), minted what is known as the first Croatian frizatik between 1196 and 1204. After 1205, the King would delegate the minting to the Ban of Croatia. This money was named after the ban – the banovac (denarius banalis). The symbols found on these coins included a running marten, a star and crescent to symbolize Croatia, and a two-barred cross to symbolize Hungary.

The first recorded mint was located in Pakrac between 1256 and 1260, when it was moved to Zagreb where it would operate until 1384. King Louis I the Great was the first who forbade the minting of the banovac in 1364, preferring the royal currency instead. The rulers from the Capetian House of Anjou such as Charles I Robert had started changing this policy as early as 1323. At the same time, in the mid-13th century the commune of Šibenik minted a silver coin called bagatin, and later under the Republic of Venice copper coins were minted for Split, Zadar, Hvar and Trogir. In 1443, Frederick III of Habsburg granted the privilege of coining money to Stjepan II Frankopan, and to Jan Vitovec, both Bans of Croatia.

At the start of the 15th century (1400–1500), coastal Croatia came under increasing attack by the Ottoman Empire, which wanted to take control of it from the Republic of Venice. Venice succeeded in maintaining control over the current Croatian territory except for the city-state of Dubrovnik, which became independent during this time, and minted and refined their own coinage over the span of five years. This Republic of Dubrovnik coinage was called the artiluc. During this five-year span, other Croatian coastal towns, Zadar, Šibenik, Trogir, Split and Hvar also minted their own similar coinage. Venetian currency such as the Venetian lira and the Venetian ducat were used in Venetian possessions in Dalmatia.

== Early modern period through the Age of Revolutions ==
The Habsburg Empire used the Austro-Hungarian florin since 1754. Printed money was introduced into the Croatian territory in 1778 in the city of Pag. This new currency was referred to as assignats, which were also being introduced into France at the same time. Previously the city of Pag had relied on salt to pay officers, clerks and doctors. To convert salt to assignats, the salt amount was converted to a lira equivalent, which was noted on the assignats by including sum and issue date information.

In the Austrian Empire, in 1848 Josip Jelačić was appointed Ban of Croatia, and he issued a combination of coins and banknotes during his time as ruler. For smaller-scale transactions, coins called križar and forint (minted in Zagreb) were utilized. Križar were minted from copper and forint from silver. For larger transactions of enterprises, communalities, and trading houses, banknotes backed by guarantees were issued instead. The florin was replaced by the Austro-Hungarian krone in 1892.

== 20th century ==
With the creation of Yugoslavia in 1918, the Serbian dinar was adopted alongside the Yugoslav krone in Croatia. For a short while, the Fiume krone was circulated in Fiume, today's Rijeka. The Serbian dinar also became the currency of the Kingdom of Serbs, Croats and Slovenes. In 1929, the name of the country was changed from Kingdom of the Serbs to Kingdom of Yugoslavia, and thus, the name of the currency was changed from the Serbian dinar to the Yugoslav dinar.

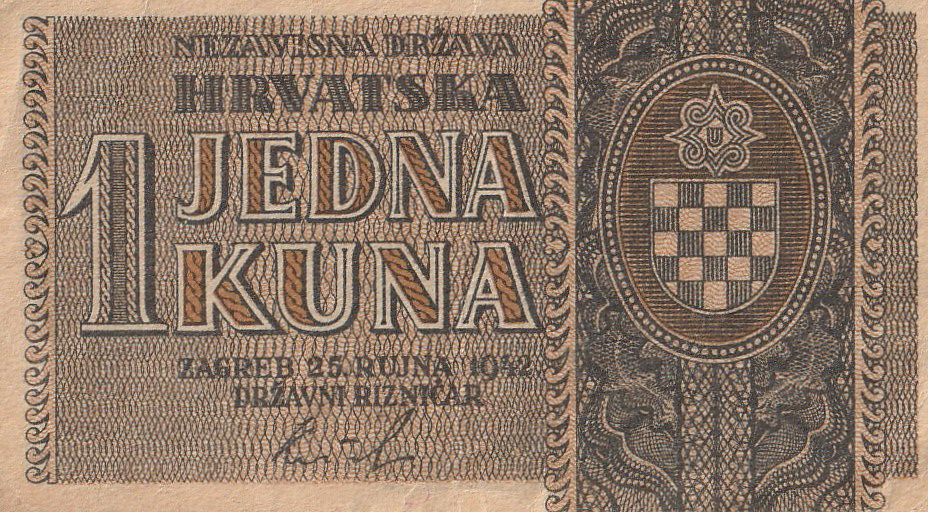
An Independent State of Croatia kuna banknote, 1942 series

From 1941 to 1945 during World War II in Yugoslavia, the Independent State of Croatia adopted the kuna as the currency on 26 July 1941. The Independent State of Croatia kuna at the time of adoption included banknotes of 10, 50, 100, 500, and 1,000. Banknotes of 1, 2, were later introduced in 1942, and 5,000 banknotes were added in 1943.

From 30 June to 9 July 1945, the Kuna was removed from the currency circulation and replaced by the 1944 issue of the Yugoslav Dinar. At the time of reissue, the Yugoslav Dinar had a fixed exchange rate of 40 Kn (Kuna) = 1 dinar.

== Since independence ==
In 1991, Croatia officially declared its independence from the Socialist Federal Republic of Yugoslavia and became a separate country. After independence, a period of transition began to the Croatian dinar. On May 30, 1994, the Croatian National Bank moved to a new currency, the Croatian kuna. The name was chosen as the name of the currency to represent the fiscal history of Croatia. One kuna was equivalent to 1000 dinars. The modern kuna became the official currency of Croatia on 30 May 1994. Coins were in denominations of 1, 2, 5, 10, 20, and 50 lipa. The banknotes were in denominations of 5, 10, 20, 50, 100, 200, 500, and 1000 kuna.

The self-proclaimed Serb entity Republic of Serbian Krajina did not use the kuna or the Croatian dinar. Instead, they issued their own Krajina dinar until the region was reintegrated into Croatia in 1995. Between 1996 and 1998, the United Nations Transitional Administration for Eastern Slavonia, Baranja and Western Sirmium facilitated gradual introduction of the currency into Eastern Slavonia, Baranja and Western Syrmia where it was used in parallel with other currencies. The core inflation rate of Croatian kuna averaged at 1.482 percent from January 2001 until October 2022.

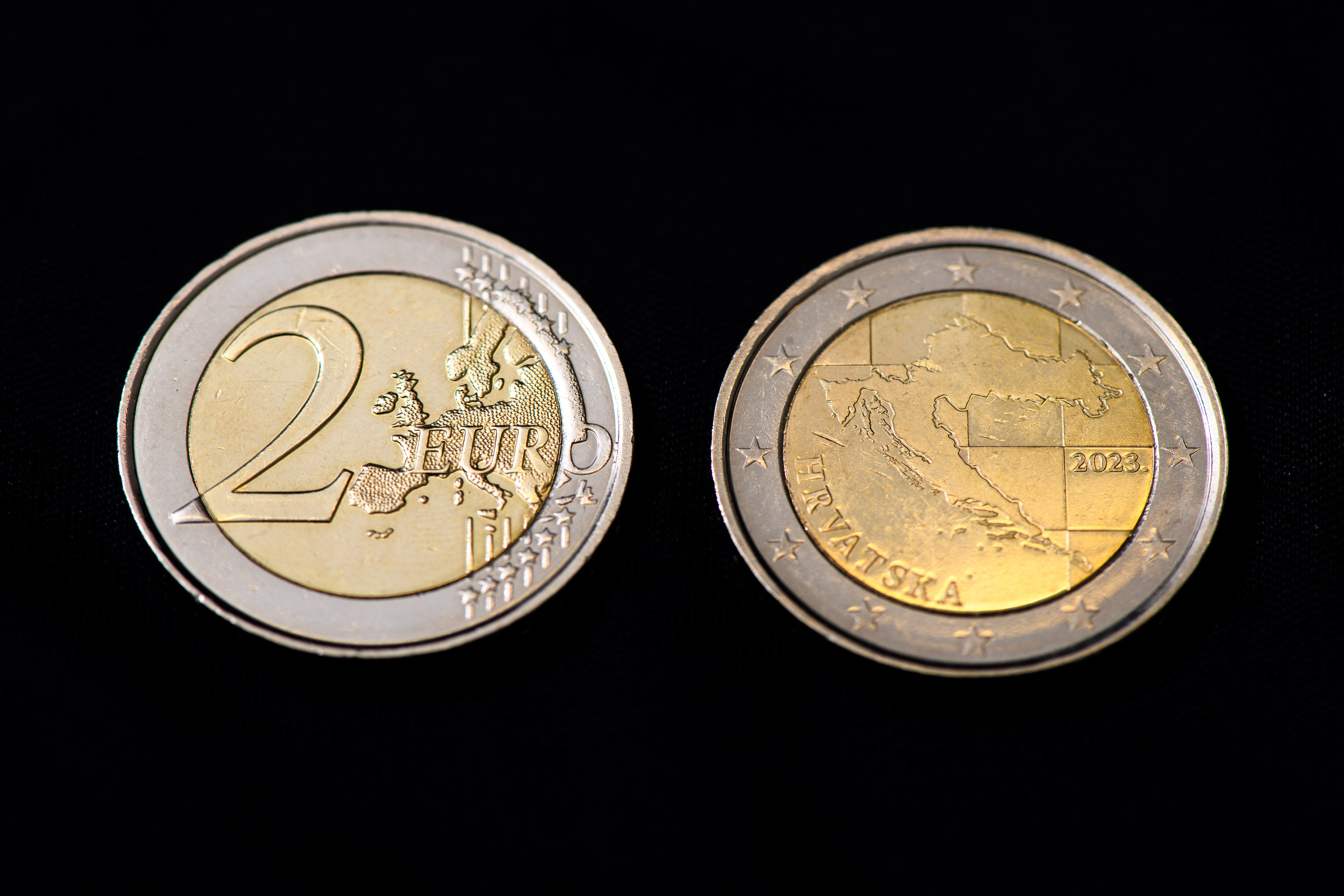
A €2 Croatian euro coin, 2022

In the process of accession of Croatia to the European Union, the government decided to eventually replace the kuna with the euro (€, EUR). Following the entry into the ERM II regime in 2020, a fixed conversion rate was set at €1 = 7.53450 kn in 2022, which was the final year for the kuna as Croatia replaced it with the euro on 1 January 2023. All Croatian bank accounts and credit cards were automatically converted to euros. State-owned finance agency Fina, Hrvatska pošta and all banks in Croatia offered exchange services for kuna coins and notes to euro at no charge for 12 months after the introduction of euro, while the Croatian National Bank offered exchange for coins until the end of 2025 and for notes indefinitely.

== See also ==
- Croatian euro coins
- Economy of Croatia

== Sources ==
- Kolar-Dimitrijević, Mira (2014). Povijest novca u Hrvatskoj, 1527–1941 [History of money in Croatia, 1527–1941] (in Croatian). ISBN 978-953-8013-03-4.
- Jareb, Mario (2022). "Kuna kao simbol novčane vrijednosti i heraldički znamen u prošlosti i sadašnjosti" [The Croatian Kuna as a Symbol of Monetary Value and a Heraldic Symbol in Past and Present]. Povijesni prilozi (in Croatian). 41 (62). Croatian Institute of History: 5–46. doi:10.22586/pp.v41i62.21810. ISSN 1848-9087.
