= Nicholas VII Hahót =

Hungarian baron and soldier

Nicholas (VII) Hahót

Ban of Slavonia
- Reign: 1343–1346; 1353–1356
- Predecessor: Mikcs Ákos (1st term); Stephen Lackfi (2nd term)
- Successor: Nicholas Szécsi (1st term); Leustach Paksi (2nd term)
- Born: 1290s
- Died: 1359
- Noble family: Hahót
- Issue: Stephen I Bánfi; Francis; Nicholas VIII; John I Bánfi; Nicholas I Bánfi; Ladislaus I Bánfi
- Father: Stephen I
- Mother: N Péc

Nicholas (VII) from the kindred Hahót (Hungarian: Hahót nembeli (VII.) Miklós; died 1359) was a Hungarian baron and soldier, who served as Ban of Slavonia from 1343 to 1346 and from 1353 to 1356; and Ban of Croatia from 1345 to 1346 and from 1353 to 1356. In this capacity, he played a key role in the restoration of the Hungarian suzerainty over Croatia. Also known as Nicholas of Alsólendva (Hungarian: alsólendvai Miklós), he was the progenitor of the powerful Bánfi de Alsólendva noble family.

== Ancestry ==
Nicholas was born into the Hahold branch of the gens Hahót in the 1290s, as the only son of Stephen I, who was mentioned as ispán of Varaždin County in 1297, and an unidentified daughter of Palatine Denis Péc. Stephen Hahót was a loyal supporter of Andrew III of Hungary, participating in several military campaigns against Austria and the rival Kőszegi family in Transdanubia and Slavonia.

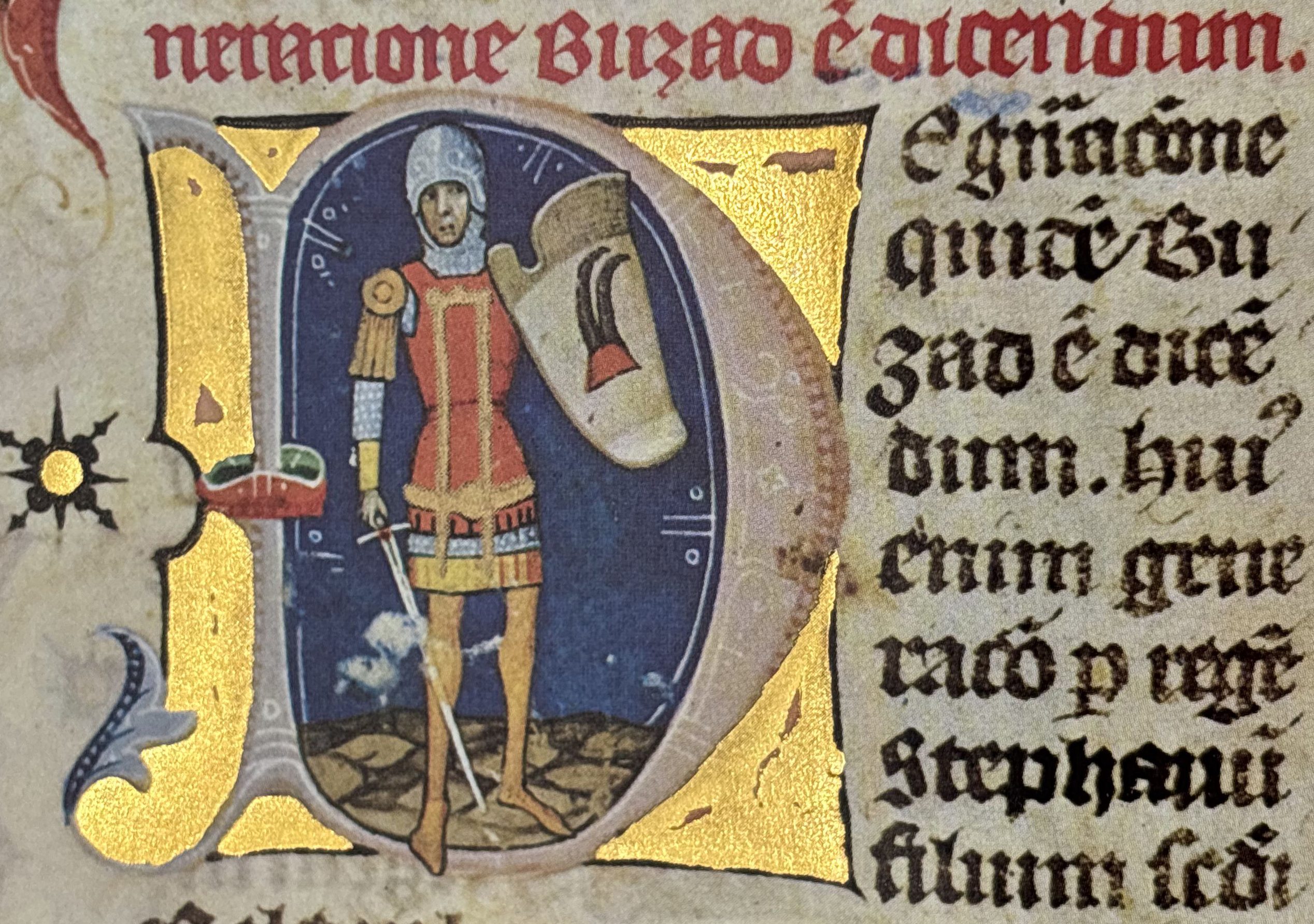
Hahold I, ancestor of the Hahóts

According to the Illuminated Chronicle which was written in the 1350s, when Nicholas' political career reached its peak, the ancestor of the Hahót kindred was a certain German knight Hahold I (Nicholas' great-great-great-grandfather) who was a descendant of the Counts of Weimar-Orlamünde and settled down in the Kingdom of Hungary in 1163 upon the invitation of Stephen III of Hungary to fight against usurper uncle Stephen IV of Hungary and his allies, the Csáks.

Majority of the historians rejected this interpretation. Elemér Mályusz identified the two geographical names with Wartburg and Meissen in Thuringia (Margravate of Meissen), noting that none of them were part of the estates of the House of Weimar-Orlamünde, which ruled Meissen from 1046 to 1067. Endre Tóth tried to reconstruct the origin of the kindred based on the spread of the name Hahold in German-speaking areas. Near Freising, the name was relatively frequently used since the 8th century, in addition, it appeared altogether with the name Arnold in the 13th century, which was also used for four generations in the Hahót kindred. Hahold's theory of origin had a long tradition, as the Illuminated Chronicle only preserved the narrative of the so-called gesta of the age of King Stephen V of Hungary (r. 1270–72), compiled by magister Ákos.

Nicholas' grandfather Hahold IV (fl. 1251–75) already styled himself "lord of Alsólendva" (today Lendava, Slovenia) in 1272, proving that he owned and possibly built the castle himself by then. As ispán of Varaždin County, Stephen represented the royal power in that territory against overwhelming Kőszegi forces in the last years of Andrew III. Following the extinction of the Árpád dynasty in 1301, royal power collapsed and a dozen lords, or "oligarchs", who had by that time achieved de facto independence of the monarch to strengthen their autonomy. One of these oligarchs of the last generation, John Kőszegi besieged and occupied Alsólendva around 1314 (formerly historians János Karácsonyi and Erik Fügedi incorrectly identified Ivan Kőszegi as belligerent and set 1292 for the date of the siege). Whether Stephen was still alive during this act, it is unknown as he disappeared from the sources after 1297, but his son Nicholas was first mentioned by contemporary records only in 1317.

== Early career ==
As he participated in the unification war of Charles I of Hungary against the oligarchs according to a royal charter, historian Éva B. Halász considered Nicholas was born in the first half of the 1290s. From 1319 to 1323, he was frequently mentioned as royal squire and royal youth (Latin: aule iuvenis) in the court of Charles, and was called "vir nobilis magister Nicolaus", proving his lackland social status after the Kőszegis' military campaign. A "brave soldier", Nicholas was a loyal supporter of the young king as he could hope the recovery of lost family landholdings and castles only from a successful restoration of the strong royal power by Charles. According to the afore-mentioned royal charter from 1319, Nicholas fought in the war against Stefan Milutin, King of Serbia across the river Sava, when Charles I retook control over Belgrade and seized the fortress of Macsó (today Mačva, Serbia) to restore the Banate of Macsó. For his merits, Nicholas regained Alsólendva Castle and its surrounding villages from Charles I of Hungary in 1323, who, as one of his charters concluded, Charles had taken "full possession" of his kingdom by that year and consolidated the royal supremacy over the whole country. In the same year, Nicholas was referred to ispán (i.e. judge) of the Queen's subjects. As a magistrate, he supervised the recovery and legal arrangement of the queenly estates which were arbitrarily usurped by the provincial lords in the previous decades.

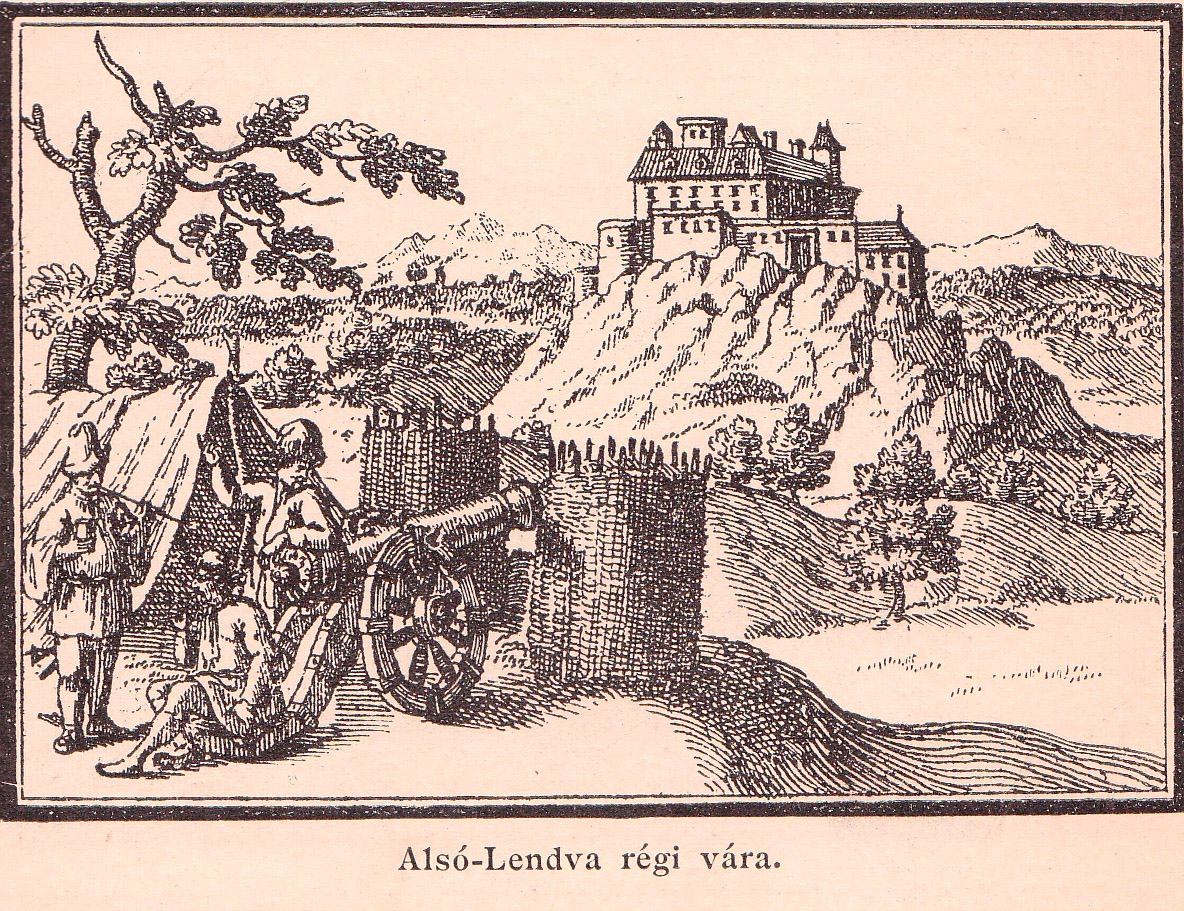
Alsólendva Castle, seat of Nicholas Hahót

In 1324, Nicholas was made ispán of Zala County. After the collapse of the Kőszegi dominion and restoration of the administrative function, his main task as ispán was to represent the royal authority and to ensure stability and military consolidation at the Western border. He held the dignity for almost twenty years until 1343. Internal peace and increasing royal revenues strengthened the international position of Hungary in the 1320s. On 13 February 1327, Charles and John of Bohemia signed an alliance against the Habsburgs, who had occupied Pressburg (today Bratislava, Slovakia). When Otto the Merry sought assistance and protection from Charles against his own brothers, Frederick the Fair and Albert the Lame, Hungarian and Bohemian troops jointly invaded Austria in the summer of 1228. The Hungarian royal army was led by Stephen Lackfi. Meanwhile, Nicholas Hahót commanded a smaller auxiliary unit into Styria to defeat Ulrich I of Walsee, who had earlier annexed the Muraköz (now Međimurje in Croatia). There Nicholas besieged and seized two castles, Haburne and Pertlstein, but the whole region only returned under Hungarian suzerainty in 1337.

Nicholas was among those appointed noble judges in May 1330, who has ruled over the kindred Záh, which one of notable members, Felician Záh had attempted to assassinate the royal family on 17 April 1330 in Visegrád. Following the trial, several members of the clan were imprisoned, executed or exiled. From 1333 to 1343, Nicholas served as Master of the horse in the queenly court of Elizabeth of Poland, the fourth and last wife of Charles. In the upcoming decade, he was appointed as an ad litem judge in various lawsuits on several occasions, residing permanently in Visegrád, then capital of the Kingdom of Hungary.

== Ban of Slavonia and Croatia ==
=== First term ===
Charles I died on 16 July 1342. His sixteen-year-old Louis I succeeded him, inheriting a centralized kingdom and a rich treasury from Charles. On 18 May 1343, Louis appointed Nicholas Hahót as Ban of Slavonia (his proper title was "Ban of the Whole of Slavonia"), replacing Mikcs Ákos who died in office. According to a royal charter, Nicholas started his journey from Visegrád to Slavonia on the next day. During the appointment, Nicholas was also granted castrum Lenti, a former estate of the disgraced Kőszegis. In the previous decades, Charles unsuccessfully attempted to reinstate royal authority in Croatia and Slavonia. Although the dominion of Mladen II Šubić collapsed in 1322, his strongest rival John Nelipić expanded his dominance over South Croatia. Charles ordered Ban Nicholas Felsőlendvai and Stephen II Kotromanić to launch a joint offensive against Nelipić, but their expedition eventually failed. Years later Felsőlendvai's successor Mikcs Ákos invaded Croatia to subjugate the local lords who had seized the former castles of Mladen Subić without the king's approval, but John Nelipić routed the ban's troops in 1326. Consequently, royal power remained only nominal in Croatia during Charles's reign, while Slavonia was integrated into the royal crown.

John Nelipić ruled almost whole Croatia beyond Mount Gvozd de facto independently from Knin until his death in 1344. Following that Louis ordered Nicholas Hahót to launch a campaign to Croatia in the autumn of 1344 (Nicholas did not issue any diploma from August to November because of his military mandate). His army unhindered marched until the fortress Knin which was defended by Nelipić's widow Vladislava in the name of their minor son and heir John II. Nicholas did not attempt to besiege the castle, instead plundered surrounding lands and villages. Fearing from possibility of a prolonged siege, Vladislava asked for peace and swore allegiance to Louis. The Republic of Venice which took advantage of the Croatian feudal anarchy for decades, and gained control over Split and Nin, acquiring most of the coast from Zrmanja River to the mouth of the Cetina since the 1320s, tried to prevent the Hungarian expansion with diplomatic means. The Venetians persuaded the widow not to hand over Knin to Nicholas' army, while aimed to establish an anti-Hungarian coalition among the Croatian lords and the Dalmatian coastal cities. As a result, Louis personally marched across Bihać to Croatia in July 1345 and forced Vladislava and her son to surrender without any military action took place. Gregory Kurjaković, Count of Corbavia and other Croatian noblemen also yielded to him during his stay in Zagreb. In the name of his king, Nicholas Hahót negotiated with Vladislava on the terms of surrender, when she agreed to hand over four castles. Thus Louis restored royal power in Croatia and pacified the country by the end of 1345.

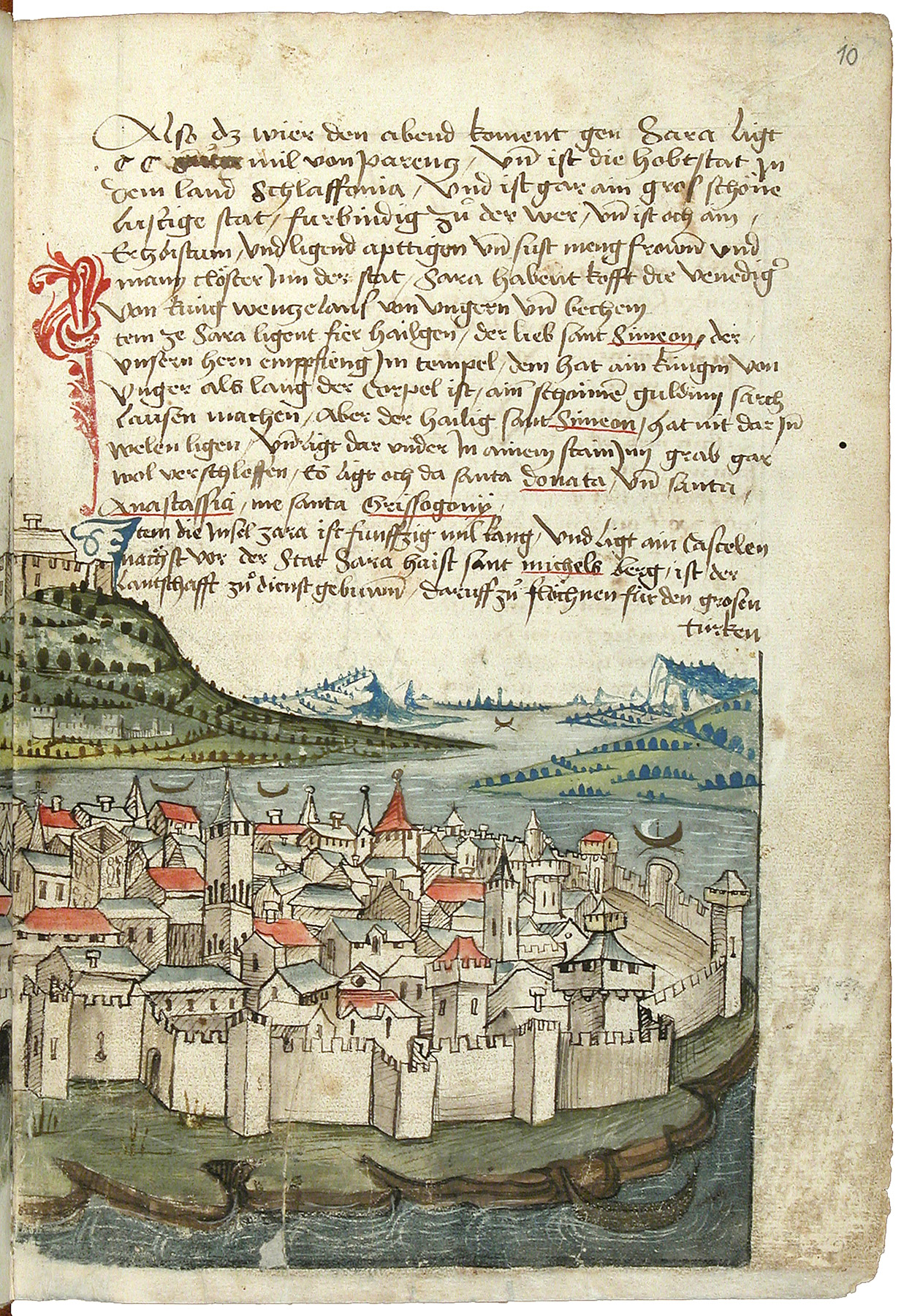
Image of Zadar (Zara) in the Late Middle Ages by Conrad Grünenberg

Since August 1345, Nicholas Hahót styled himself Ban of Slavonia, Croatia and Dalmatia, merging the two positions and extending his influence to the Croatian territories as well to represent the royal authority. This meant the restoration of the dignity of Ban of Croatia, which title was arbitrarily held for decades by the Šubići. Before Nicholas, the last person who served as Ban of Croatia, was John Babonić for a short time in 1322. The last one who was appointed by a Hungarian monarch and had actual function, was Nicholas Gutkeled in 1275. Nicholas Hahót is the only known 14th-century ban, who concluded a chamber rental contract. He issued such a document on 11 November 1344 in Zagreb, when he leased the Slavonian chamber for 300 banovac to five burghers: James, son of Vlfardus from Zagreb, in addition to brothers Nicholas, Raphael and Michael, sons of Paul, and Zuetk, son of Staulen, all four originated from Koprivnica. Nicholas Hahót also signed a contract with them to transmit the banate's share of the collection of taxes for one-year deadline.

The citizens of Zadar rebelled against the Republic of Venice and accepted Louis' suzerainty. The city also sent its delegation to Zagreb, but delayed and Louis meanwhile returned to Visegrád. Venice decided to protect its interests in Dalmatia, obtained support or neutral positions of other Dalmatian – such as Nin, Dubrovnik, Trogir and Rab – ports, gathered troops and unexpectedly started to besiege the city and the surrounding castles on 12 August 1345. According to reports, Nicholas Hahót personally mediated between Louis and Zadar, and encouraged the burghers to actively revolt. Louis dispatched Stephen Kotromanić to assist the burghers of Zadar, but his army did not fight against the Venetians. According to a chronicle written by an anonymous Minorite friar, Venice bribed the Hungarian commanders, Stephen Kotromanić and Nicholas Hahót not to interfere in the skirmish. Louis's brother, Andrew, Duke of Calabria, was murdered in Aversa on 18 September 1345, which caused the emergence of the Neapolitan issue, marginalizing the Dalmatian campaign. In April 1346, Louis marched to Dalmatia to relieve Zadar, but the Venetians again bribed his commanders, Kotromanić, Lackfi and Hahót, according to the above-mentioned chronicle. When the citizens broke out and attacked the besiegers on 1 July, the royal army failed to intervene, and the Venetians overcame the defenders outside the walls of the town. Although the king commissioned Nicholas to organize the city's food supply, the ban belatedly and slowly fulfilled the task. As a result, the citizens considered him as a traitor. Lacking military support from Louis, Zadar surrendered to the Venetians on 21 December 1346.

According to a charter, Nicholas wounded in the clashes against Venice at Zadar. Few days after the failure in July, Louis dismissed him as Ban of Slavonia and Croatia and replaced with Nicholas Szécsi, one of the most influential barons in the second half of the 14th century. That fact could confirm the information of the Minorite friar in connection with the bribery. While historians Gyula Kristó, Pál Engel and Antal Pór accepted the friar's theory, B. Halász argued, Nicholas did not lost his political influence, as appeared as ad litem judge in several times at Buda throughout 1347, and also received land donations from Louis during that time. For Louis, the Kingdom of Naples became a more important scene than Dalmatia and Zadar, where Nicholas Hahót, who had decades of military experience, could have provided a much greater service to the king, B. Halász emphasized.

=== Second term ===
The anonymous Minorite friar narrated in his work that Nicholas was among those barons who escorted Duke Andrew's posthumous son, the infant Charles Martel, who was transferred from Naples to Visegrád in February 1348. Louis recognised his nephew as the legitimate ruler of Naples and also laid claim to the regency of the kingdom during the minority of Charles Martel. The king appointed Nicholas as the tutor of little duke, but Charles Martel died only three months after his arrival on 10 May 1348. Around August 1349, Nicholas was made ispán of Zala County for the second time. He held that position until December 1351.

In 1351, Louis made his youngest brother Stephen as Duke of Croatia and Dalmatia, before finally trusting him with the government of Slavonia in 1353. Stephen's political role was nevertheless rather insignificant, despite that he was heir presumptive after Charles Martel, his nephew's death. Louis reinstated Nicholas to the combined dignity of Ban of Croatia, Dalmatia and Slavonia to administer the province on behalf of Duke Stephen in April 1353, replacing Stephen Lackfi, who died in office. In the summer of 1354, both Duke Stephen and Ban Nicholas participated in Louis' military campaign against the Serbian Empire, forcing Stefan Dušan to withdraw from the region along the river Sava. Duke Stephen died in a pandemic during the expedition on 9 August 1354. The new-born John was installed Duke of Slavonia after his father's death, with his mother Margaret as nominal regent, but in reality, Nicholas governed the province, Margaret and her son even resided in Buda until mid-1355.

Taking advantage of the inner war within the Šubić clan, Louis determined to acquire the remaining Dalmatian cities. After the death of Mladen III Šubić in 1348, Klis and Skradin were ruled by his widow Jelena, in the name of their son Mladen IV. She was unable to defend the cities from the many pretenders, she asked her brother Stefan Dušan for aid, who sent an army, led by knight Palman and Đuraš Ilijić, to defend Klis and Skradin, respectively. Louis entrusted Nicholas to launch a campaign against the forts in 1355. The Serbians were not able to hold out the pressure of the Hungarian army. Upon the king's order, Nicholas Hahót besieged and captured Klis and Omiš. Following that Serbia started to disintegrate after the death of Stefan Dušan in December 1355. A new war broke out between the Kingdom of Hungary and the Republic of Venice over Dalmatia in the spring of 1356 and the royal court decided to end the duchy of Slavonia's autonomy, Margaret was thus deprived of nominal regency. Despite his military success a few weeks ago, Nicholas was also dismissed from his dignity, replaced by Leustach Paksi. In the next year, he was appointed Master of the treasury in the court of Elizabeth of Bosnia, the second queen consort to Louis I. Beside that he also functioned as ispán of the Segesd queenly estate, laid in Somogy County. Nicholas Hahót died in 1359.

== Family ==
Ancestors of Nicholas VII Hahót

16. Hahold II Hahót
8. Hahold III Hahót
17. Hahold II's first wife
4. Hahold IV Hahót
2. Stephen I Hahót
1. Nicholas VII Hahót
24. Lucas I Péc
12. George Péc
6. Denis Péc
3. N Péc

Nicholas Hahót had six sons and a daughter from his marriage to an unidentified noblewoman. His sons entered political service only in the 1360s, after their father's death. They started to call themselves Bánfi (or Bánffy) meaning the "son of a Ban" in reference to their influential and deeply respected father who had been the Ban of Dalmatia and Croatia and thus restored royal power over the country after seven decades. Two of Nicholas' sons, Stephen I and John I Bánfi themselves also served as Bans of Croatia jointly from 1381 to 1385, while the latter one was Ban of Macsó too between 1386 and 1387. The powerful Bánfi family, which flourished until 1645, descended directly from John, as Stephen's branch became extinct after two generations. Nicholas Hahót's other two sons, Francis and Nicholas VIII predeceased their father without issue, while Nicholas I Bánfi had three daughters, leaving no male heir. The sixth son Ladislaus' branch also died out after three generations, as his son Sigismund had at least six daughters but no son. Nicholas' only unidentified daughter married Henry Rohonci, a descendant of the Hahóts' archenemy, the Kőszegi family.

== Sources ==
- B. Halász, Éva (2010). "Hahót Miklós szlavón báni működése (1343–1356) [Nicholas Hahót as Ban of Slavonia (1343–1356)]". In G. Tóth, Péter; Szabó, Pál (eds.). Középkortörténti tanulmányok 6 (in Hungarian). University of Szeged. pp. 7–12. ISBN 978-963-306-006-3.
- Engel, Pál (1996). Magyarország világi archontológiája, 1301–1457, I. [Secular Archontology of Hungary, 1301–1457, Volume I] (in Hungarian). História, MTA Történettudományi Intézete. ISBN 963-8312-44-0.
- Fine, John V. A (1994). The Late Medieval Balkans: A Critical Survey from the Late Twelfth Century to the Ottoman Conquest. The University of Michigan Press. ISBN 0-472-08260-4.
- Kristó, Gyula (1988). Az Anjou-kor háborúi [Wars in the Age of the Angevins] (in Hungarian). Zrínyi Kiadó. ISBN 963-326-905-9.
- Markó, László (2006). A magyar állam főméltóságai Szent Istvántól napjainkig: Életrajzi Lexikon [Great Officers of State in Hungary from King Saint Stephen to Our Days: A Biographical Encyclopedia] (in Hungarian). Helikon Kiadó. ISBN 963-208-970-7.
- Tóth, Endre (2003). "Hoholt – Hahót: A jövevény nemzetségek eredetéhez [Hoholt – Hahót: On the Origin of the Foreign Kindreds]". Századok (in Hungarian). 137 (2). Magyar Történelmi Társulat: 265–296. ISSN 0039-8098.
- Zsoldos, Attila (2005). Az Árpádok és asszonyaik. A királynéi intézmény az Árpádok korában [The Árpáds and their Women: The Institution of Queenship in the Era of the Árpáds] (in Hungarian). MTA Történettudományi Intézete. ISBN 963 8312 98 X.
- Zsoldos, Attila (2011). Magyarország világi archontológiája, 1000–1301 [Secular Archontology of Hungary, 1000–1301] (in Hungarian). História, MTA Történettudományi Intézete. ISBN 978-963-9627-38-3.

Nicholas VII Genus Hahót Born: ? Died: 1359
Political offices
Preceded by Mikcs Ákos	Ban of Slavonia; 1343–1346	Succeeded by Nicholas Szécsi
Vacant	Ban of Croatia; 1345–1346	Succeeded by Nicholas Szécsi
Preceded by Stephen Lackfi	Ban of Slavonia; 1353–1356	Succeeded by Leustach Paksi
Preceded by Stephen Lackfi	Ban of Croatia; 1353–1356	Succeeded by John Csúz
