= Banjica (disambiguation) =

Banjica (Serbian Cyrillic: Бањица) is a Serbo-Croatian place name, meaning "small spa". It may refer to:

- Banjica, Belgrade, Serbia
- Banjica forest, Serbia
- Banjica, Čačak, Serbia
- Dolna Banjica, North Macedonia
- Banjica, Čaška, a village in Čaška Municipality, North Macedonia
- Banjica (župa), a medieval župa in Bosnia

== See also ==
- Banjica concentration camp
- VK Banjica, Serbian water polo club
- Banica (disambiguation)
