= Marturina =

Former tax in the Kingdom of Hungary

The coat-of-arms of Slavonia, depicting a marten

The marturina or kunovina, referring to marten's fur, was a tax collected in the lands to the south of the Drava River in the medieval Kingdom of Hungary among the early Slavs. The term became important in the history of Croatian currency because it was the first of several instances of martens being used to symbolize money in Croatia.

== History ==
The name of the marturina indicates that it was originally an in-kind tax, collected in marten's fur. Similar taxes—payable in the form of an animal's fur—also existed in other territories. These taxes were typically paid by the Slavic inhabitants of the densely forested regions of Eastern Europe to the rulers of the neighboring nomadic peoples. There is a documented 1018 tribute paid by towns on the Dalmatian islands to the Republic of Venice, where Rab was charged in silk, Krk in fox pelts, while the towns of Osor and Beli on Cres were charged in marten pelts. An Arabic travel writer Abu Hamid al-Gharnati recorded in 1154 that a "land of Slavs" near the Danube used actual marten pelts embroidered with royal markings as currency, but did not specify the exact extent of the territory; because he also separately described travels in Hungary proper, it is assumed today that he meant the areas known as Slavonia at the time.

Historian Pál Engel proposes that the marturina was also "originally a special tax that the Slavs of Slavonia had to pay to their Hungarian overlord". The tax was also collected in other territories to the south of the Drava (in Požega and Valkó Counties).

The earliest record of the term marturina is dated to the end of the 12th century. A document recorded in 1300 that those who were obliged to pay the marturina used to give one marten's fur to their lords in each year. During or before the reign of Coloman the Learned, King of Hungary (r. 1095–1116), the marturina was converted into a money tax. A Golden Bull of King Andrew from 1222 stated that the same tax was collected since the age of King Coloman. Initially, each mansio (or peasant household) was to pay 12 Freisach denars, but it was gradually raised during the 13th century before it was returned to its original rate around 1300. The currency minted in Slavonia after the Freisach denars, the denarius banalis (between 1235 and 1349), also consistently showed the picture of a marten. Those who were to pay marturina were also obliged to pay another tax, known as pondus. On the other hand, commoners paying the marturina were exempt of the chamber's profit (a tax collected in Hungary).

The marturina was initially a royal revenue, collected for the monarch, or for the duke who ruled Slavonia in the monarch's name. However, when parcels of the royal domain were given away, the grantee typically also seized the right to collect the royal taxes in his new estate. The marturina (and the pondus) collected in royal estates was attached to the honor of the Bans (or governors) of Slavonia in the 14th century. Revenues from the marturina made up around 8,000 florins in 1427.

== Legacy ==
Croatian historian Vjekoslav Klaić (1904) and economic historian Zlatko Herkov (1956) examined the extent of the historical use of marturina/kunovina. Linguist Dalibor Brozović published a work about this in 1994, relying on the aforementioned sources, and his book was effectively the official rationale of the Croatian National Bank for switching from the name Croatian dinar to Croatian kuna.

== Sources ==
- Engel, Pál (2001). The Realm of St Stephen: A History of Medieval Hungary, 895–1526. I.B. Tauris Publishers. ISBN 1-86064-061-3.
- Weisz, Boglárka (2018). "Royal Revenues in the Árpádian Age". In Laszlovszky, József; Nagy, Balázs; Szabó, Péter; Vadas, András (eds.). The Economy of Medieval Hungary. BRILL. pp. 255–264. ISBN 978-90-04-31015-5.
- Jareb, Mario (2022). "Kuna kao simbol novčane vrijednosti i heraldički znamen u prošlosti i sadašnjosti" [The Croatian Kuna as a Symbol of Monetary Value and a Heraldic Symbol in Past and Present]. Povijesni prilozi (in Croatian). 41 (62). Croatian Institute of History: 5–46. doi:10.22586/pp.v41i62.21810. ISSN 1848-9087. S2CID 252582018.
