= Croatian money =

Croatian money can refer to:

- Croatian dinar (Croatian currency until 1994)
- Croatian kuna and lipa (Croatian currency since 1994)
- Independent State of Croatia kuna, a former Croatian currency used during World War II
- Frizatik, a medieval Croatian currency
