= Stephen Hahót =

Hungarian noble

Stephen (I) Hahót

Ispán of Varaždin
- Reign: 1297
- Predecessor: Ernye Ákos
- Successor: Vacant
- Died: after 1297
- Noble family: gens Hahót
- Spouse: N Péc
- Issue: Nicholas VII
- Father: Hahold IV

Stephen (I) from the kindred Hahót (Hungarian: Hahót nembeli (I.) István; fl. 1272–97) was a Hungarian noble, who served as ispán of Varaždin County in 1297.

== Career ==
Stephen was born into the Hahold branch of the gens Hahót as the son of Hahold IV (fl. 1251–75). He had a brother, Matthew. Stephen married an unidentified daughter of Palatine Denis Péc.

After the death of his father, King Ladislaus IV of Hungary confirmed Stephen as the owner of the ruined castles Lenti and Alsólendva (today Lendava, Slovenia) and the surrounding villages in 1278. The castles were besieged and demolished by the troops of Ottokar II of Bohemia in 1272.

Similarly to other members of his kindred, Stephen was a loyal supporter of Andrew III since his coronation took place on 23 July 1290. When Andrew invaded Austria, forcing Duke Albert to withdraw his garrisons from the Hungarian towns and fortresses at the western border, Stephen participated in the siege of Pettau (today Ptuj in Slovenia), where his horse was stabbed. Stephen was able to survive and escape from the battlefield due to Peter Gosztolyai, one of his bannermen's self-sacrificing, who handed over his horse to his lord. On 14 July 1291, Andrew donated land domains to the soldier's widow and orphans as compensation at the request of Stephen Hahót. In contrast, Veronika Rudolf considered that the fort ("Potul") located near Zagreb. Alongside several barons and prelates, Stephen was present, when Andrew III and Albert concluded their peace in August 1291.

Stephen was mentioned as chancellor (Latin: conclarius) of the royal stewards in 1291. He fought against the Kőszegi family in the following years. He was mentioned as ispán of Varaždin County in 1297. In this capacity, he represented the royal power in that territory against overwhelming Kőszegi forces in the last years of Andrew III. After that Stephen disappeared from the sources. One of the oligarchs in Transdanubia, John Kőszegi besieged and occupied his domain centre, castrum Alsólendva around 1314. Whether Stephen was still alive during this act, it is unknown. Stephen's son Nicholas VII regained the castle from Charles I of Hungary. Later he was made Ban of Croatia and Slavonia, and became the ancestor of the powerful Bánfi de Alsólendva family.

== Sources ==
- Engel, Pál (1996). Magyarország világi archontológiája, 1301–1457, I. [Secular Archontology of Hungary, 1301–1457, Volume I] (in Hungarian). História, MTA Történettudományi Intézete. ISBN 963-8312-44-0.
- Karácsonyi, János (1901). A magyar nemzetségek a XIV. század közepéig. II. kötet [The Hungarian genera until the middle of the 14th century, Vol. 2] (in Hungarian). Hungarian Academy of Sciences.
- Rudolf, Veronika (2023). Közép-Európa a hosszú 13. században [Central Europe in the Long 13th Century] (in Hungarian). Arpadiana XV., Research Centre for the Humanities. ISBN 978-963-416-406-7.
- Tantalics, Béla (2009). A Bánffy család szellemi hagyatéka [The Intellectual Legacy of the Bánffy Family] (in Hungarian). Lenti Honismereti Egyesület. ISBN 978-963-06-5372-5.
- Zsoldos, Attila (2011). Magyarország világi archontológiája, 1000–1301 [Secular Archontology of Hungary, 1000–1301] (in Hungarian). História, MTA Történettudományi Intézete. ISBN 978-963-9627-38-3.

Stephen I Genus Hahót Born: ? Died: after 1297
Political offices
Preceded by Ernye Ákos	Ispán of Varaždin; 1297	Succeeded by Kőszegi dominion
