= Artiluc =

Croatian coin

Artiluc

Artiluc (Serbo-Croatian: artiluk, Italian: artilucchi) was a silver coin forged and used in the 17th century in the Republic of Ragusa that had its capital city in Dubrovnik, modern-day Croatia.
