= Hahold III Hahót =

13th-century Hungarian noble

Hahold (III) Hahót

Ispán of Vas
- Reign: 1237–1239
- Predecessor: Martin Ják
- Successor: Baldwin Rátót
- Died: after 1239
- Noble family: gens Hahót
- Issue: Hahold IV
- Father: Hahold II
- Mother: first wife of his father

Hahold (III) from the kindred Hahót (Hungarian: Hahót nembeli (III.) Hahót; fl. 1226–39) was a Hungarian noble, who served as ispán of Vas County from 1237 to 1239.

Hahold III was born into the Hahold branch of the gens Hahót as the son of Hahold II (fl. 1192) and his unidentified first wife. He had a brother, Michael I. Their father married for the second time, which marriage produced further three sons: Ákos, Nicholas I and Denis I.

== Sources ==
- Zsoldos, Attila (2011). Magyarország világi archontológiája, 1000–1301 [Secular Archontology of Hungary, 1000–1301] (in Hungarian). História, MTA Történettudományi Intézete. ISBN 978-963-9627-38-3.

Hahold III Genus Hahót Born: ? Died: after 1239
Political offices
| Preceded by Martin Ják | Ispán of Vas; 1237–1239 | Succeeded by Baldwin Rátót |
