= Banjica, Čačak =

Banjica Бањица
- Village
- Interactive map of Banjica
- Location within Serbia
- Coordinates: 43°49′11″N 20°22′23″E
- Country: Serbia
- District: Moravica District
- Municipality: Čačak

Area
  - Total: 11.52 km^{2} (4.45 sq mi)
- Elevation: 437 m (1,434 ft)

Population (2011)
  - Total: 314
  - Density: 27.3/km^{2} (70.6/sq mi)
- Time zone: UTC+1 (CET)
  - Summer (DST): UTC+2 (CEST)

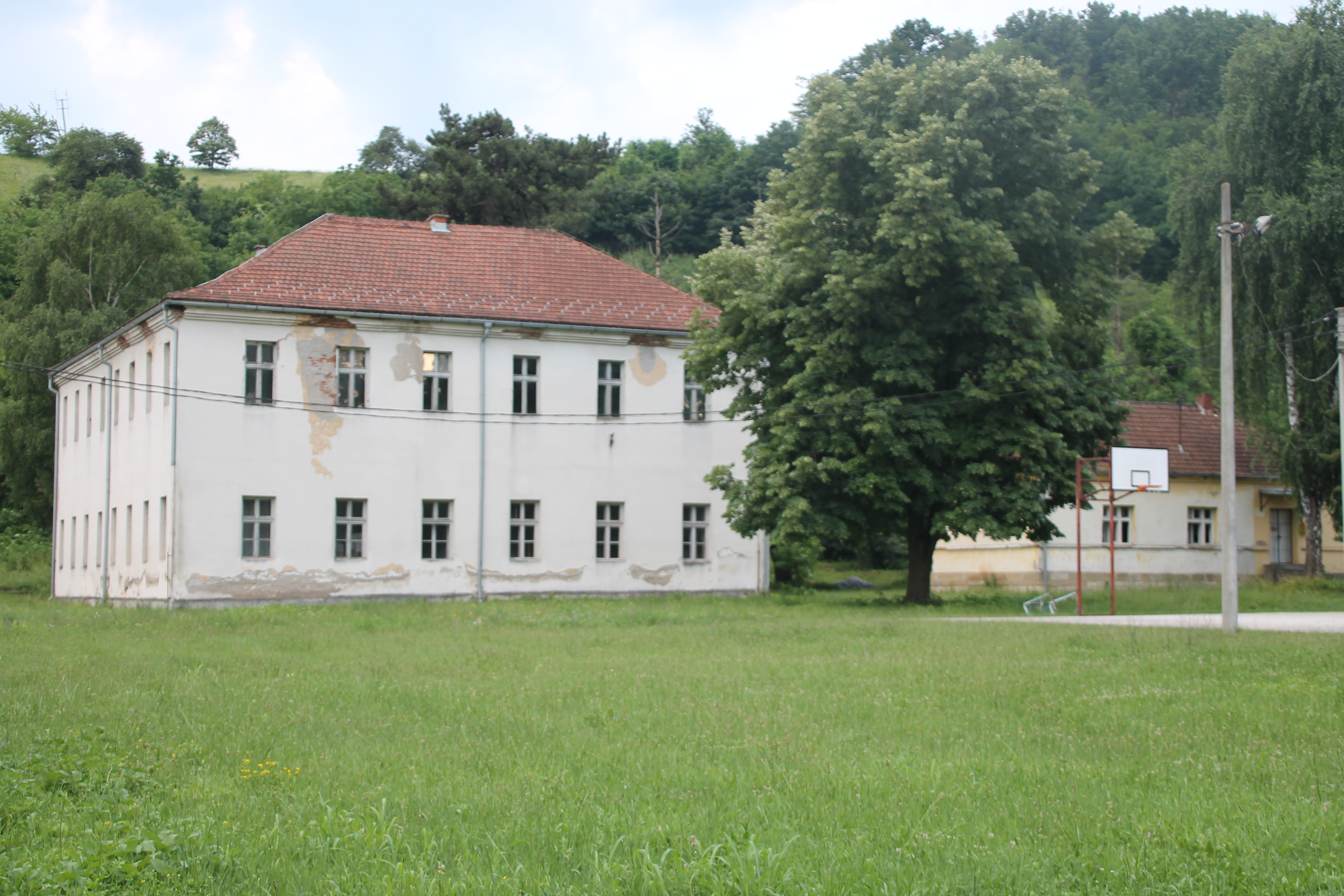

Banjica (Serbian Cyrillic: Бањица) is a village in the municipality of Čačak, Serbia. According to the 2011 census, the village has a population of 314 people.
