= Hahold IV Hahót =

Hungarian noble

Hahold (IV) Hahót

Ispán of Rojcsa
- Reign: c. 1248–1255
- Predecessor: first known
- Successor: Jursa (?)
- Died: after 1275
- Noble family: gens Hahót
- Issue: Matthew; Stephen I
- Father: Hahold III

Hahold (IV) from the kindred Hahót (Hungarian: Hahót nembeli (IV.) Hahót; fl. 1251–75) was a Hungarian noble.

Hahold IV was born into the Hahold branch of the gens Hahót as the son of Hahold III, who served as ispán of Vas County between 1237 and 1239. Hahold IV had two children: Matthew and Stephen I.

According to a diploma from 1255, Stephen Gutkeled, who functioned as Ban of Slavonia since 1248, ordered Hahold, who "then" was ispán of Rojcsa (today Rovišće, Croatia), to conduct a legal process. Thus Hahold held that position from around 1248 to 1255. Rojcsa was a border ispánate near Bjelovar, in the territory of Križevci County (Hungarian: Körös). In this capacity, his superior was Stephen Gutkeled. He assisted his lord in the supervision of royal grants in Slavonia, who was entrusted with this task by King Béla IV of Hungary, in the period between April 1255 and early 1257. In the second half of the 1250s, Hahold was active in the Duchy of Styria, as a member of the Hungarian administration led by captain Stephen Gutkeled. Ottokar aus der Gaal's Steirische Reimchronik ("Styrian Rhyming Chronicle") incorrectly claimed that Stephen, due to his unpopularity, was replaced by Hahold ("Hoholdus de Lindva") as captain of Styria after a year (i.e. 1255). After 1258, Hahold belonged to the Styrian court of Duke Stephen, Béla's eldest son. The duke recovered several villages – including Rédics – in Zala County to Hahold, which were confiscated from him by Béla IV during his revision policy of former royal land donations, because it was proved that Hahold bought these landholdings earlier.

In the 1260s, he had several conflicts with the Gyüre kindred, neighboring landowners in Zala County, when Hahold's soldiers killed Thomas Gyüre along with his servants, who also acted as a royal emissary during that time. Already in the 1250s, Hahold arbitrarily seized the right to collect tithe to the Cathedral Chapter of Zagreb in the Gyüres' land. Following that Hahold seized his neighbours' lands themselves, as a result King Béla IV of Hungary personally forced him to return the lands to the Gyüres. Through the mediation of Csák Hahót, the ispán of Zala County, Hahold made peace with the Gyüre kindred in November 1267. According to the agreement, Hahold and his opponents divided among themselves an unidentified land. Then it was agreed that Hahold, with his two sons and his wife, would swear in his own house before the testimony of the chapter of Vasvár and the king's man, Master Pós (Pous), the clerk of the royal court, that he would not maintain a hostile relationship with the Gyüre clan, which Csák and other members of the Hahót clan swore an oath. Hahold undertook to pay damages of 25 marks and also had to return the three horses of Thomas Gyüre until the deadline of January 1268. In addition, Hahold and his familia undertook to go into the Vasvár jail for a single day, and after leaving the prison, apologize to the Gyüres.

In 1272, he called himself "lord of Alsólendva" (today Lendava, Slovenia), proving that he owned and possibly built the castle himself by then. During the Bohemian–Hungarian War, when Ottokar II of Bohemia invaded the kingdom in the spring of 1272, his forts Lenti and Alsólendva were besieged and demolished.

Through his son Stephen, he was a forefather of the powerful Bánfi de Alsólendva noble family. In the same year, Hahold made land donation to the Vasvár monastery, and swore his son Matthew to reserve that. Hahold died sometime between 1275 and 1278.

== Sources ==
- Béli, Gábor (2013). "Börtönviselés perbeli egyezség alapján a XIII. században [Imprisonment on the Basis of a Court Settlement in the 13th Century]". In Máthé, Gábor; Révész, T. Mihály; Gosztonyi, Gergely (eds.). Jogtörténeti Parerga. Ünnepi tanulmányok Mezey Barna 60. születésnapja tiszteletére (in Hungarian). ELTE Eötvös Kiadó. pp. 66–72. ISBN 978-963-312-166-5.
- Karácsonyi, János (1901). A magyar nemzetségek a XIV. század közepéig. II. kötet [The Hungarian genera until the middle of the 14th century, Vol. 2] (in Hungarian). Hungarian Academy of Sciences.
- Rudolf, Veronika (2023). Közép-Európa a hosszú 13. században [Central Europe in the Long 13th Century] (in Hungarian). Arpadiana XV., Research Centre for the Humanities. ISBN 978-963-416-406-7.
- Tantalics, Béla (2009). A Bánffy család szellemi hagyatéka [The Intellectual Legacy of the Bánffy Family] (in Hungarian). Lenti Honismereti Egyesület. ISBN 978-963-06-5372-5.
- Zsoldos, Attila (2011). Magyarország világi archontológiája, 1000–1301 [Secular Archontology of Hungary, 1000–1301] (in Hungarian). História, MTA Történettudományi Intézete. ISBN 978-963-9627-38-3.

Hahold IV Genus Hahót Born: ? Died: after 1275
Political offices
Preceded by first known	Ispán of Rojcsa c. 1248–1255	Succeeded by Jursa (?)
