= Bănică =

Bănică is both a Romanian surname and given name. Notable people with the name include:

- Bănică Oprea (born 1967), ex-footballer
- Andreea Bănică (born 1978), singer
- Andrei Bănică (born 1977), rower
- Nicuşor Bănică (born 1984), football player
- Ștefan Bănică Sr. (1933–1995), actor and singer
- Ștefan Bănică Jr. (born 1967), actor
- Theodora Bănică (born 1988), model from Luxembourg
- Andreea Marin (born 1974), formerly known as Andreea Marin Bănică, television presenter
