= Banjica, Čaška =

Banjica Banjicë
- Village
- Бањица
- Location within North Macedonia
- Coordinates: 41°41′59″N 21°39′58″E
- Country: North Macedonia
- Region: Vardar
- Municipality: Čaška

Population (2021)
  - Total: 119
- Time zone: UTC+1 (CET)
  - Summer (DST): UTC+2 (CEST)
- Car plates: VE
- Website: .

Banjica (Macedonian: Бањица, Albanian: Banjicë) is a village in the municipality of Čaška, North Macedonia.

== Demographics ==
Toward the end of the 19th and beginning of the 20th centuries, Banjica traditionally was a mixed Orthodox Macedonian and Muslim Albanian village. In the 1960s there were still 4 Muslim Albanian households left in the village.

According to the 2021 census, the village had a total of 119 inhabitants.

Ethnic groups in the village include:

Year	Macedonian	Albanian	Turks	Romani	Vlachs	Serbs	Bosniaks	Others	Total
2002	55	...	...	...	...	...	...	...	55
2021	19	98	...	...	...	...	...	2	119
