= Banica, North Macedonia =

Banica Баница
- Village
- Location within North Macedonia
- Coordinates: 41.445400°N 22.608298°E
- Country: North Macedonia
- Region: Southeastern
- Municipality: Strumica

Population (2021)
  - Total: 1,191
- Time zone: UTC+1 (CET)
  - Summer (DST): UTC+2 (CEST)
- Website: .

Banica (Macedonian: Баница) is a village in the municipality of Strumica, North Macedonia.

== Demographics ==
As of the 2021 census, Banica had 1,191 residents with the following ethnic composition:

- Persons for whom data are taken from administrative sources 750
- Macedonians 438
- Others 3

According to the 2002 census, the village had a total of 1,137 inhabitants. Ethnic groups in the village include:

- Macedonians 1,129
- Serbs 2
- Bosniaks 1
- Others 5
