= Banica, Gmina Sękowa =

Banica
- Village

- Location within Poland
- Coordinates: 49°31′55″N 21°18′40″E
- Country: Poland
- Voivodeship: Lesser Poland
- County: Gorlice
- Gmina: Sękowa

Banica [baˈɲit͡sa] (Note: Lemko Rusyn: Баниця, Banycja) is a village in the administrative district of Gmina Sękowa, within Gorlice County, Lesser Poland Voivodeship, in southern Poland, close to the border with Slovakia.

A monument to Polish airmen from the 1586 RAF Squadron, shot down over Banica on 28 August 1944 during a return flight from over Warsaw

A World War I cemetery, Number 62
