= Banitsa, Vratsa Province =

Village in northwestern Bulgaria

Banitsa Село Баница
- Village
- Location in Bulgaria
- Coordinates: 43°20′31″N 23°41′26″E
- Country: Bulgaria
- Province (Oblast): Vratsa
- Municipality (Obshtina): Byala Slatina
- Elevation: 290 m (950 ft)

Population (2021)
  - Total: 836
- Time zone: UTC+2 (EET)
  - Summer (DST): UTC+3 (EEST)

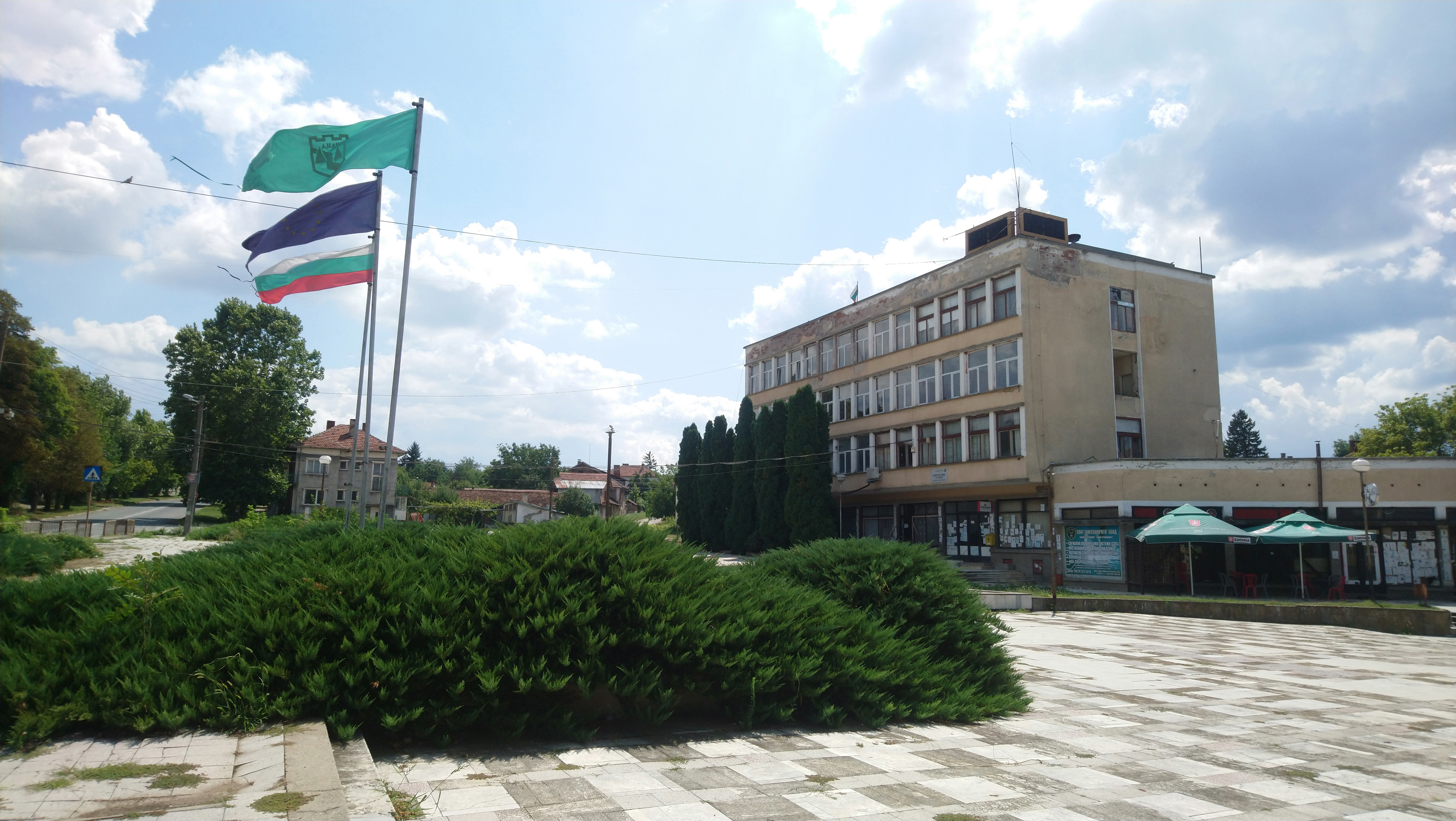
The mayor's office in village Banitsa, Vratsa Province

Banitsa (Bulgarian: Баница) is a village in Vratsa Municipality, Vratsa Province, northwestern Bulgaria. As of 2005 its population is 1,328.

The great Bulgarian poet and revolutionary Hristo Botev was killed nearby.

== Gallery ==
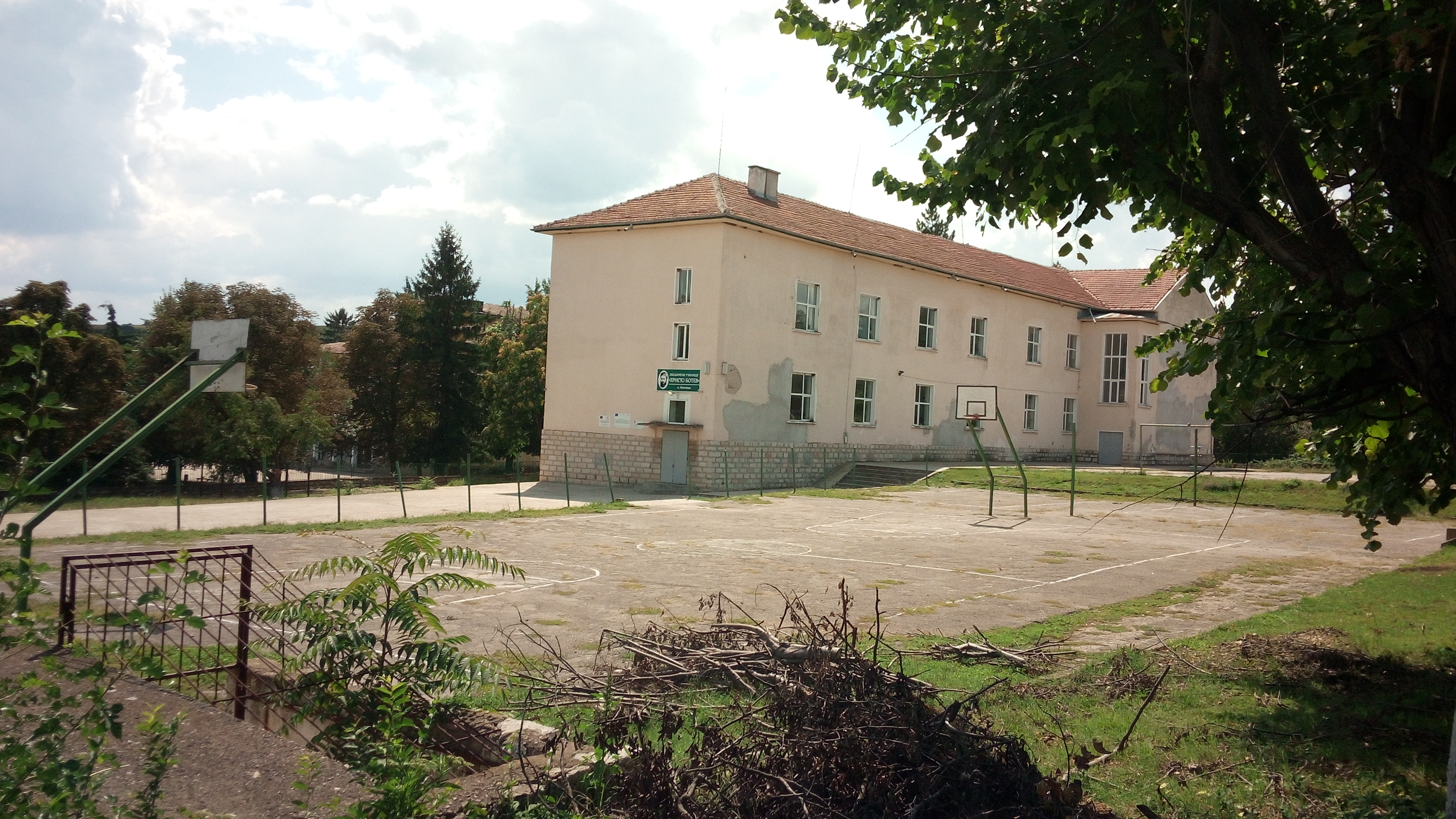
Elementary school "Hristo Botev"

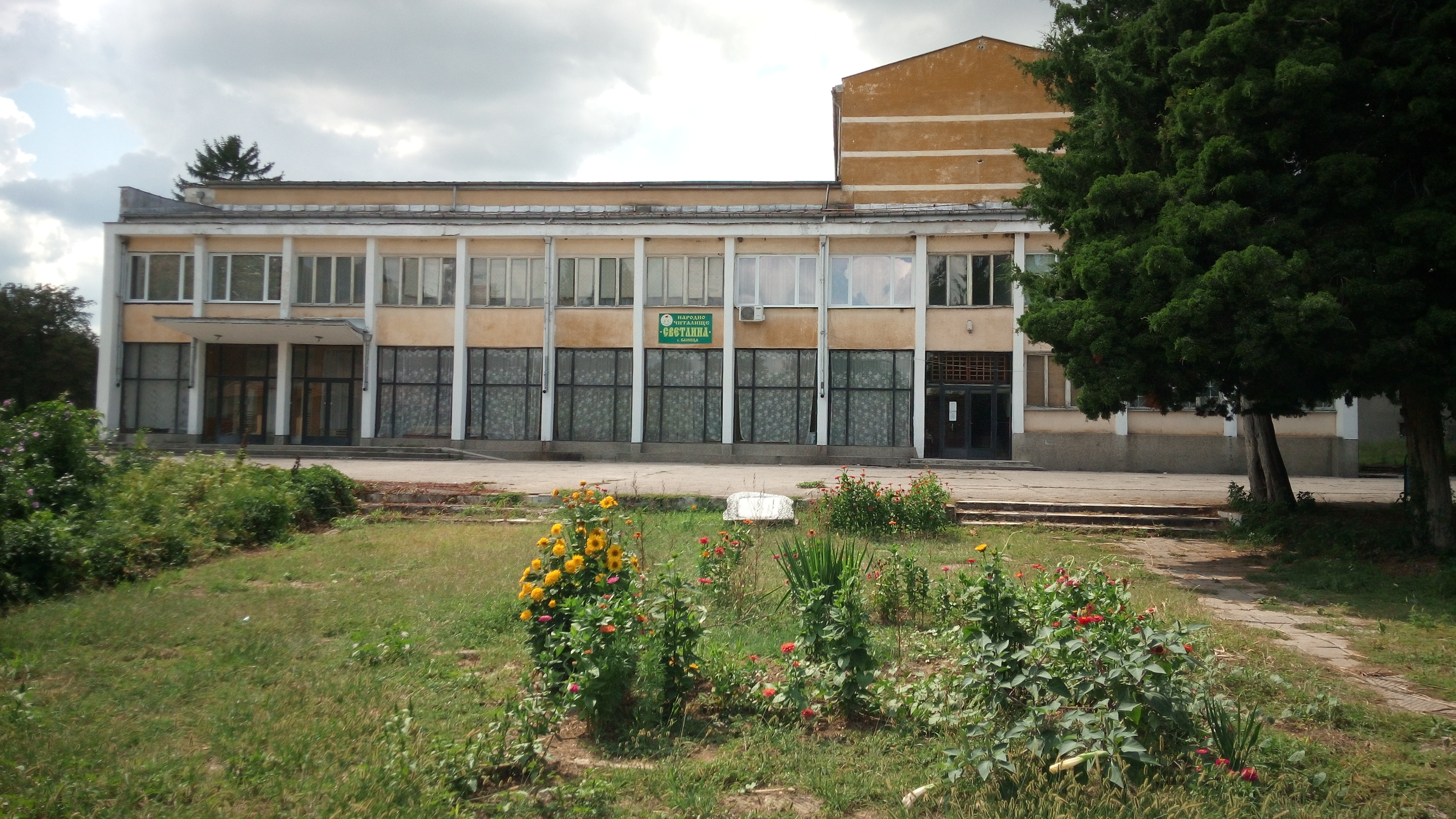
Chitalishte "Svetlina"

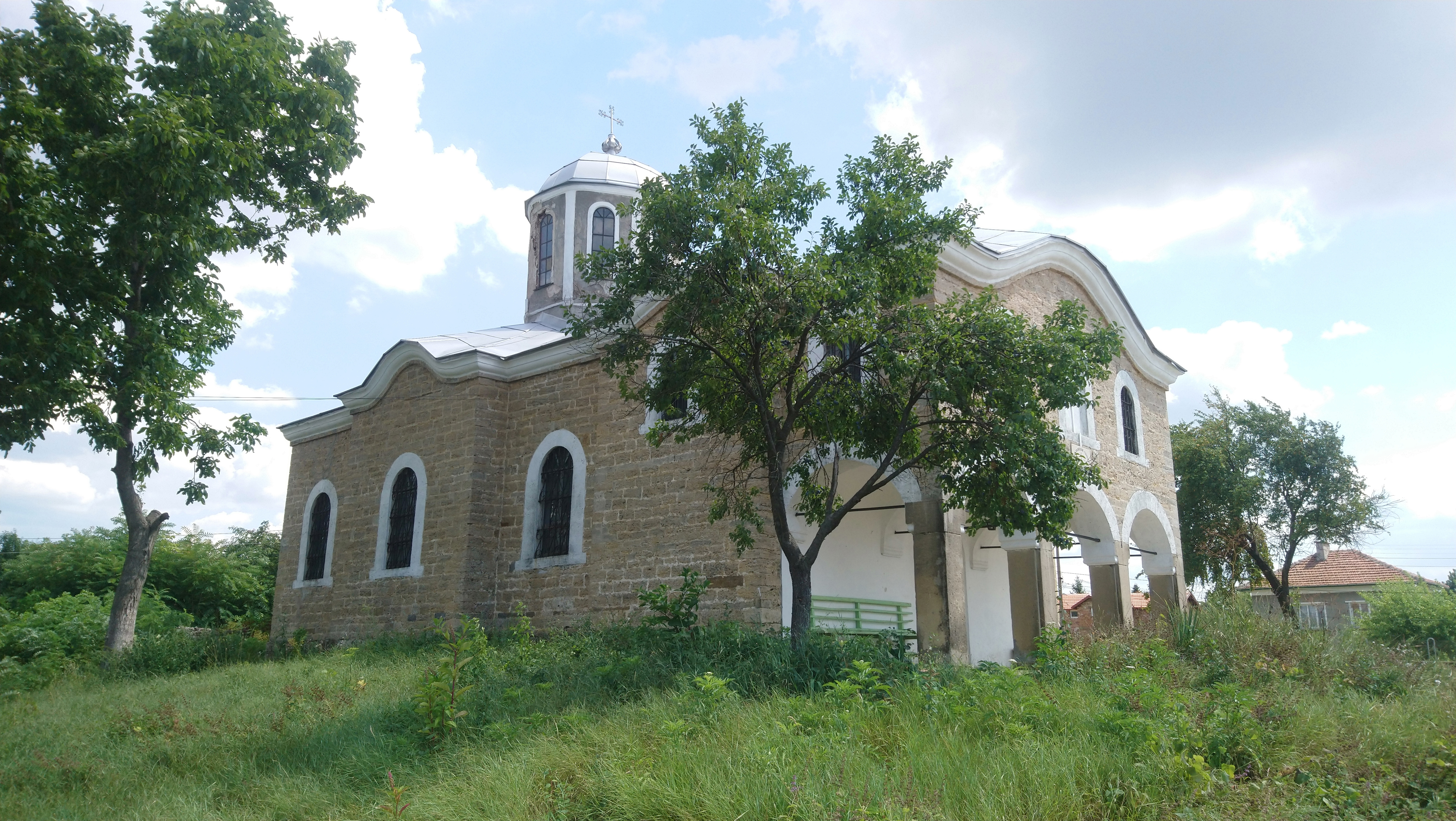
Church "Ascension of Jesus"

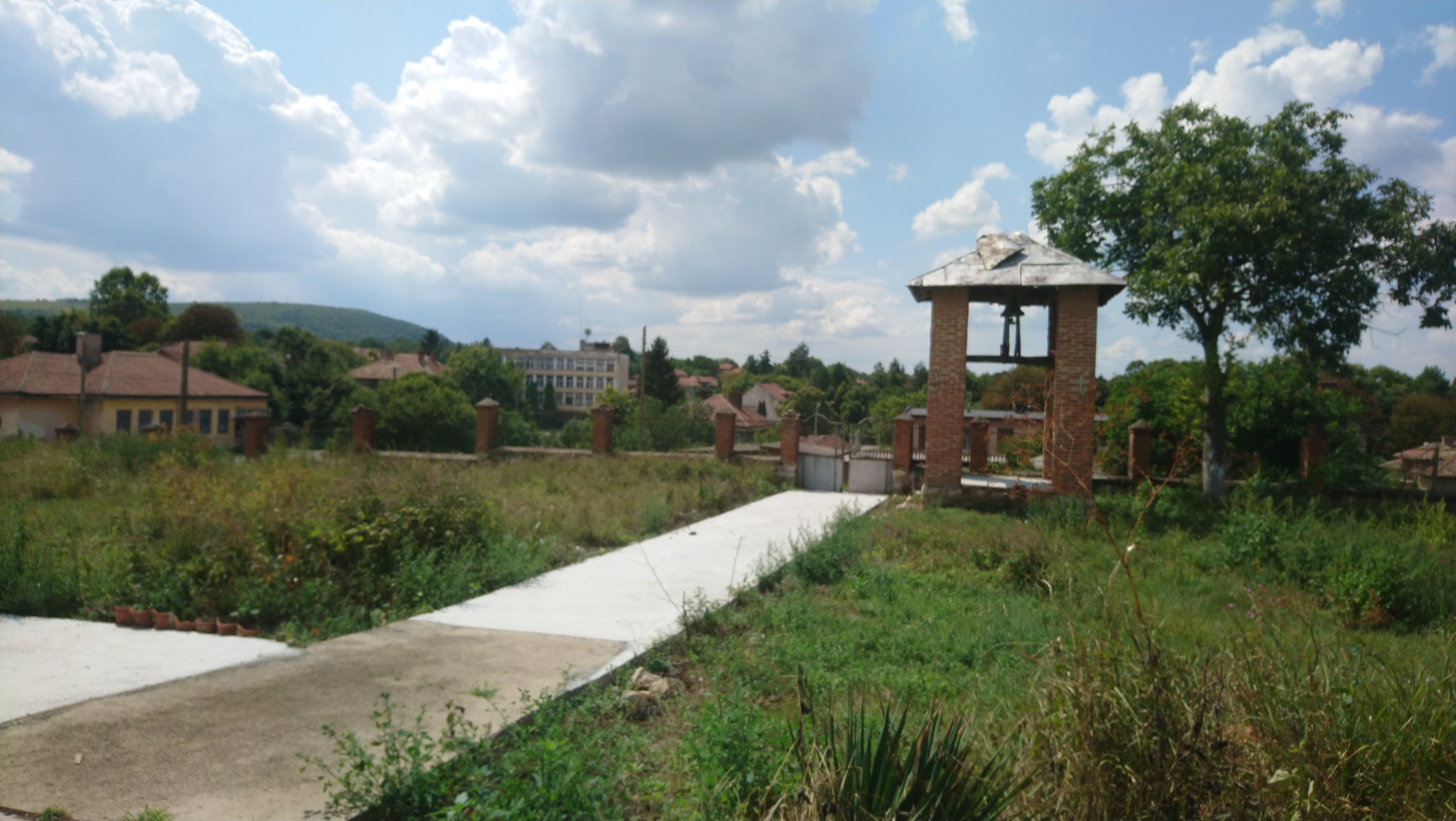
The church belfry

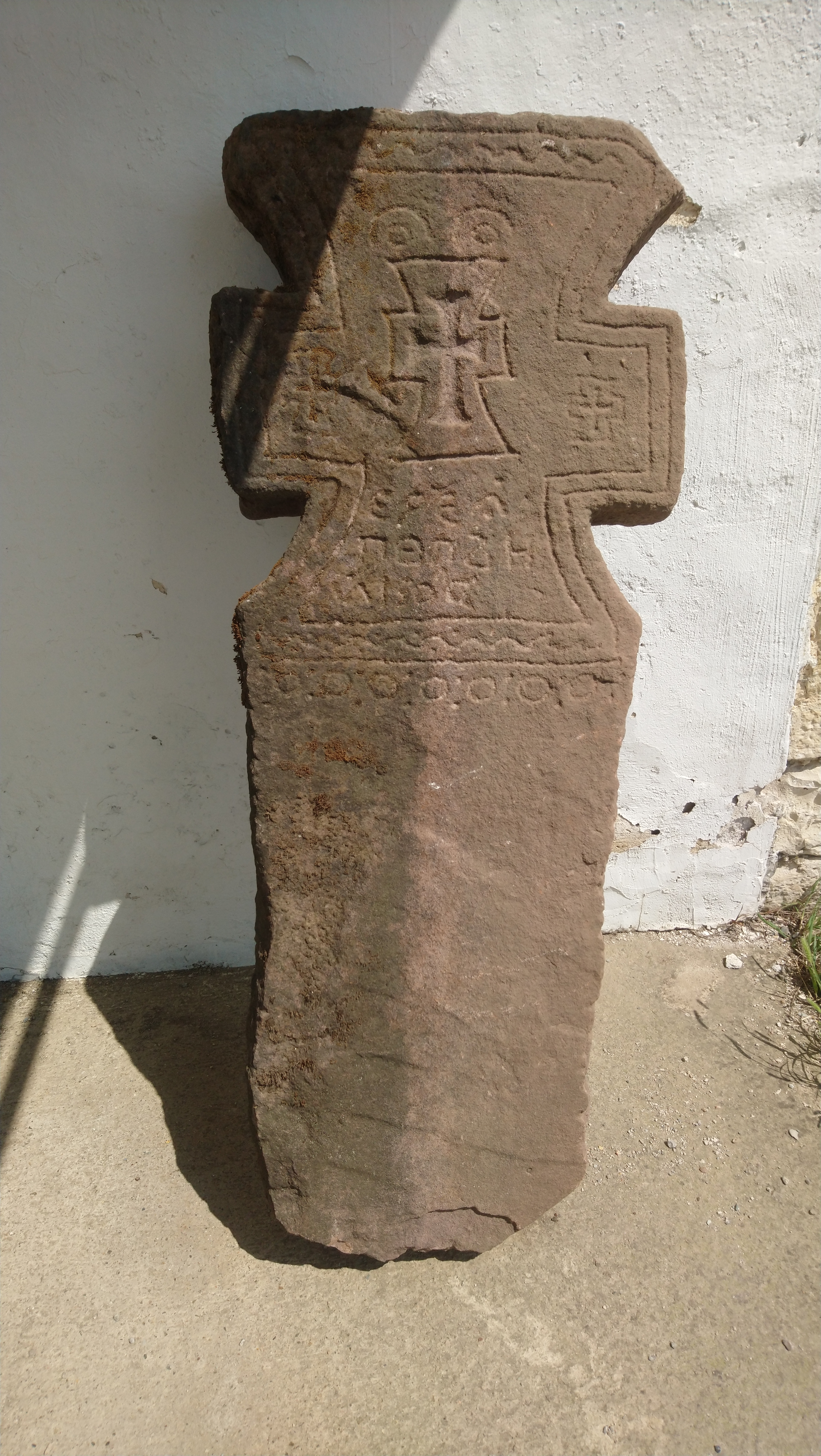
Old cross near the church entrance

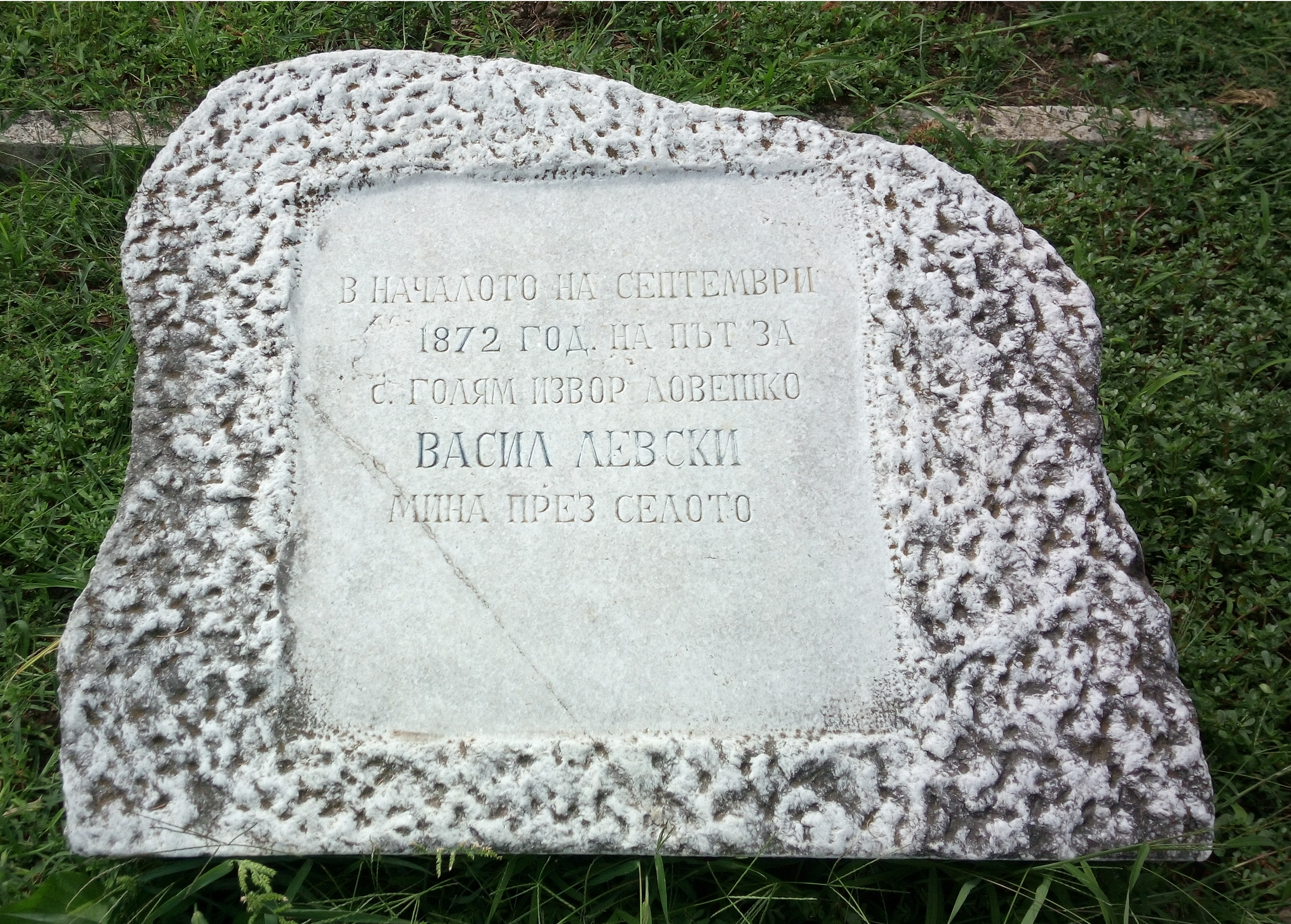
Memorial plaque to Vasil Levski's visit in early September 1872

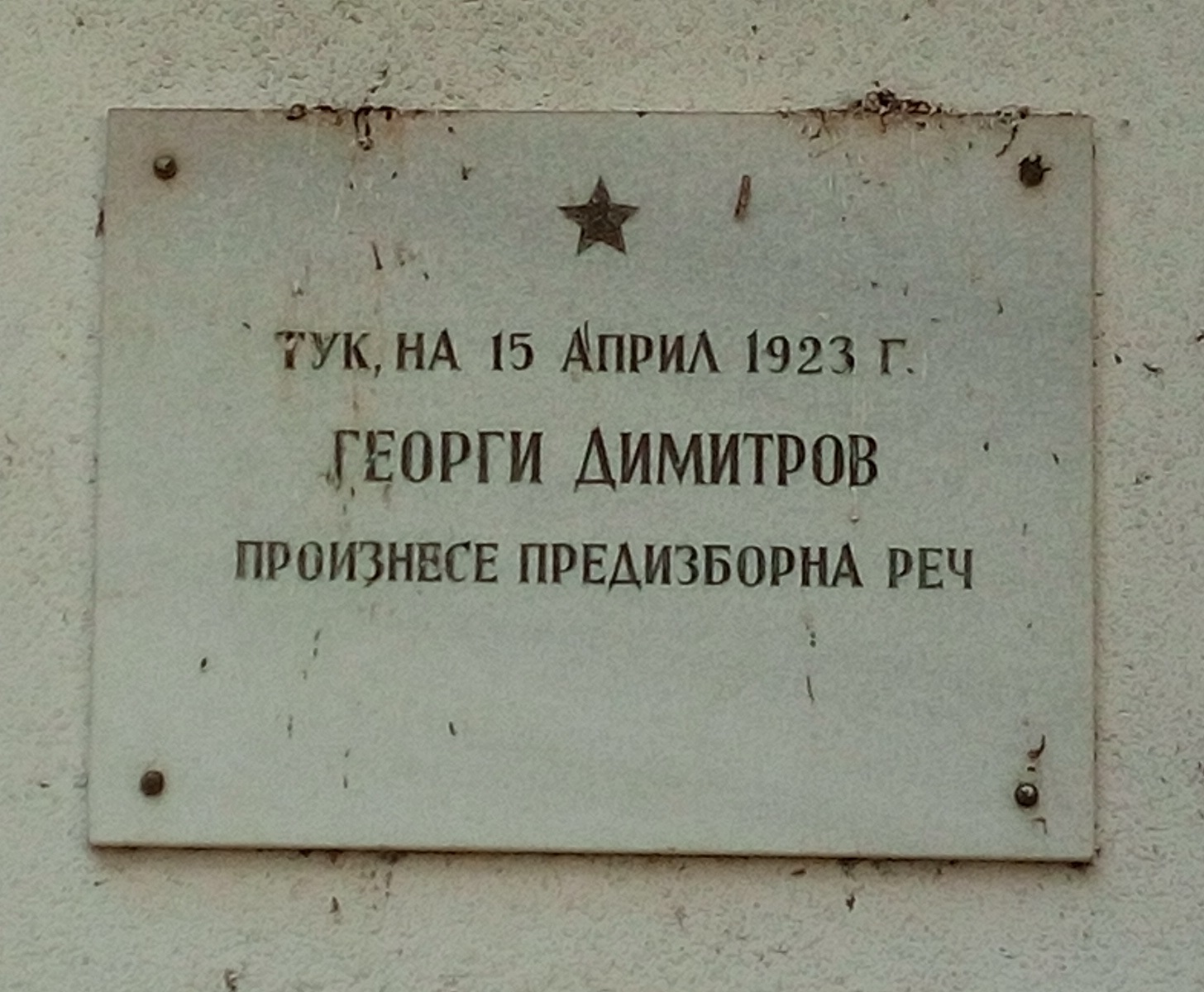
Memorial plaque to Georgi Dimitrov's visit on 15 April 1923

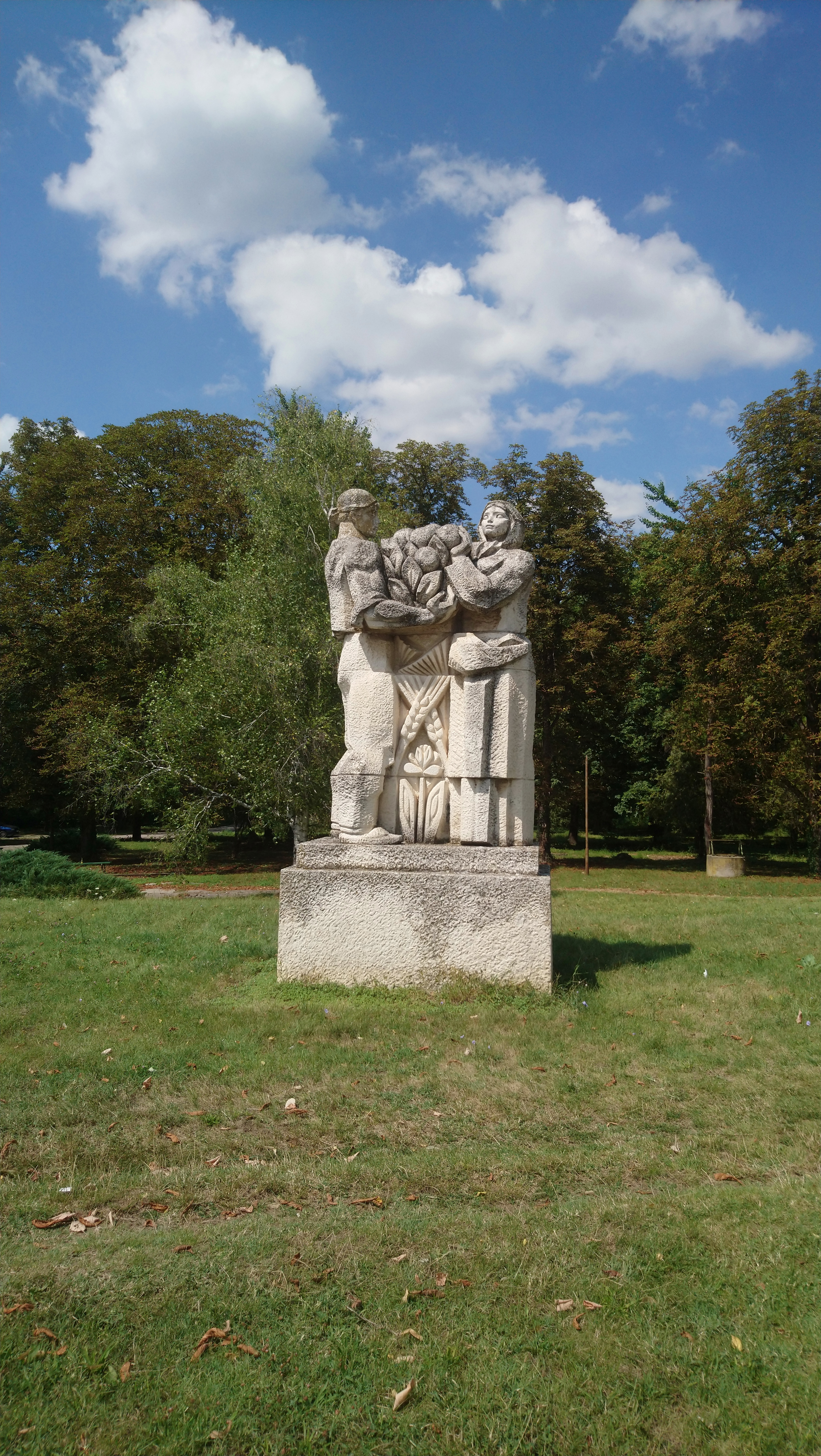
Sculpture composition in the centre of the village
