= Banica, Gmina Uście Gorlickie =

Banica
- Village
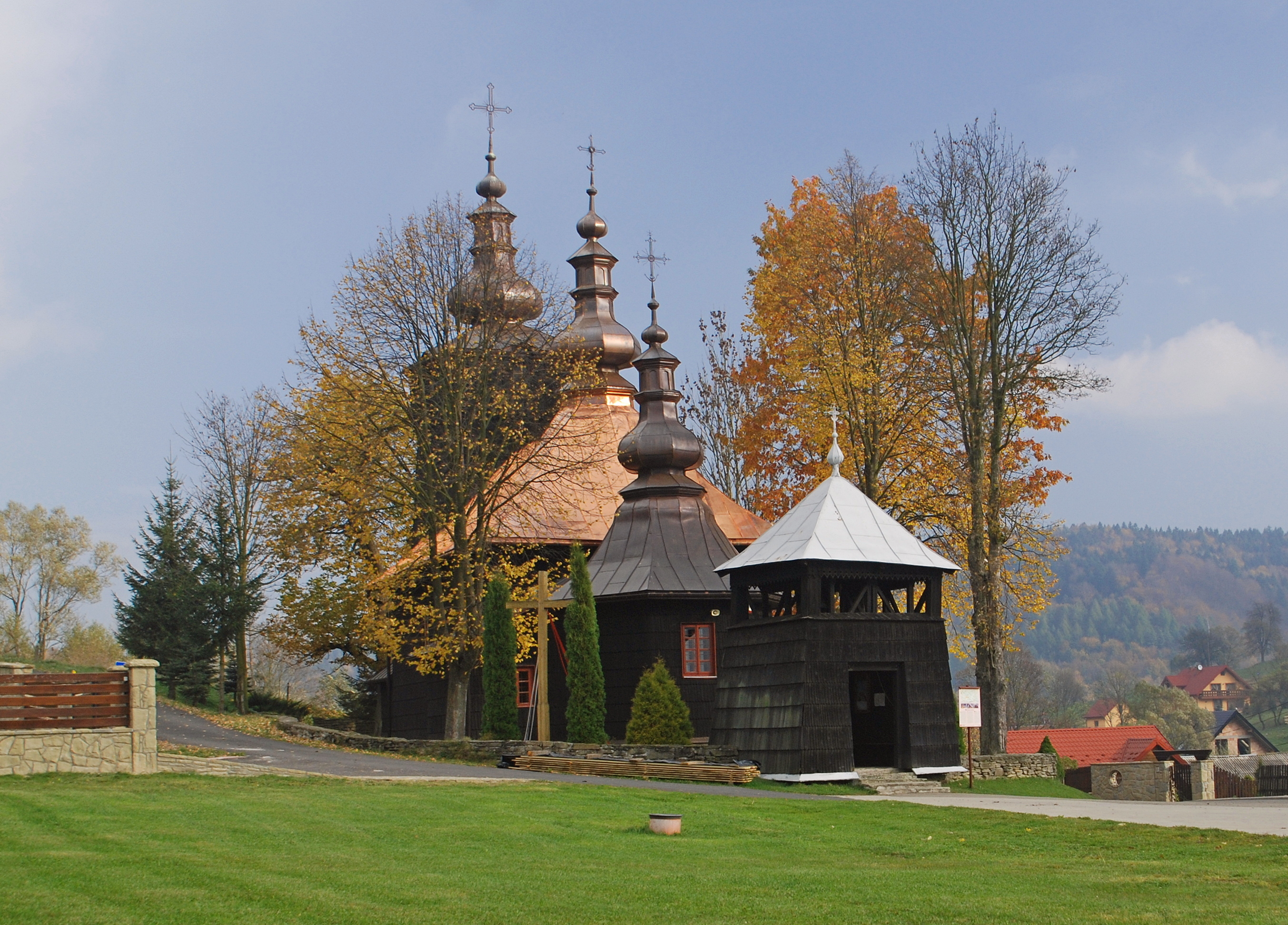
- Saints Cosmas and Damian Church

- Location within Poland
- Coordinates: 49°28′N 21°4′E
- Country: Poland
- Voivodeship: Lesser Poland
- County: Gorlice
- Gmina: Uście Gorlickie
- Population: 260

Banica [baˈɲit͡sa] is a village in the administrative district of Gmina Uście Gorlickie, within Gorlice County, Lesser Poland Voivodeship, in southern Poland, close to the border with Slovakia.
