= Frizatik =

Frizatik was a silver currency minted in the town of Friesach in Carinthia since early 12th until mid-14th century. It was primarily coined by the Archbishops of Salzburg.

== Croatian frizatik ==
There existed so-called Croatian frizatik's, used in the Kingdom of Croatia since the end of the 12th century until mid-13th century, minted by the Hungarians noblemen/rulers, like Andrew II of Hungary, who held the title of Duke of Slavonia (i.e. of Croatia and Dalmatia), and sometimes Ban of Croatia. Some coin types showcase a moving leopard/lion.

Since the 13th century was minted more widespread and notable Banovac.
