= Banovac =

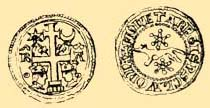
Coin of Andrew II of Hungary, or Béla IV of Hungary.

Banovac, banski denar or banica is a coin struck and used in the Kingdom of Croatia between 1235 and 1384, replacing the Croatian frizatik (which was also minted by Duke of Slavonia). The Latin name denarius banalis was derived from the words ban ("viceroy") and denarius.

The coins were first minted in Pakrac, and from 1260 in Zagreb. They were well made, of quality silver, because of which became common exchange currency in Central Europe. There exist some 400 types and sub-types of banovac.

Banovac included on obverse the image of a marten (Croatian: kuna) between two six-pointed stars (inspired by moving leopard/lion from frizatiks and duke's CoA), because marten pelts were highly valued goods used as a form of payment in Slavonia (marturina). This was one of the reasons for naming the former currency of the Republic of Croatia the kuna (used 1994–2023). On the reverse included image of Patriarchal cross#Hungary, in upper part crescent and star (symbol), and lower part two crowned heads facing each other.

The legends are:

- MONETA REGIS P SCLAVONIA (common)
- MONETA B REGIS P SCLAVONIA (moneta Belae regis pro sclavonia, scarce)
- MONETA DVCIS P SCLAVONIA (scarce)
- MONETA REGIS P VNGARIA (rare)

Initials on the Árpád Dynasty coins are:

- King Bela IV (1235–1270):
  - o - o,
  - lily - lily,
  - bird - bird,
  - h - R (Ban Henricus Nemetujvari, 1267–1270)
- King Stephen V (1270–1272)
  - S - R (Stephanus Rex),
  - R - S (Rex Stephanus)
- King Ladislaus IV (1272–1290)
  - R - L (Rex Ladislaus),
  - L - R (Ladislaus Rex),
  - S - L (Ban Stephanus Babonich - Rex Ladislaus, 1280-1282?),
  - R - R - L (Ban Radoszlav - Rex Ladislaus, 1286–1288)
- King Andrew III (1290–1301)
  - R - A (Rex Andreas),
  - A - R (Andreas Rex),
  - S - A (Ban Stephanus Babonich - Rex Andreas, 1300–1301),
  - R - bird (Rex Andreas - Ban Stephanus Babonich, 1300–1301),
  - A - bird (Rex Andreas - Ban Stephanus Babonich, 1300–1301)

== See also ==
- Dinar
- Croatian kuna
