= Balázs Csányi =

Vice-ispán of Zala
- Reign: 1500–1501; 1520–1527
- Predecessor: Antal Szele (1st term); Mihály Sárkány (2nd term)
- Successor: János Gétyei (1st term); Mátyás Eördögh (2nd term)
- Born: 1460s
- Died: 1532
- Noble family: House of Csányi
- Spouse: N Sárkány (?)
- Issue: István II; Gergely I Ákos; Margit; Miklós II; János V a daughter
- Father: János IV Csányi
- Mother: Katalin Hosszútóti

Balázs Csányi (Hungarian: Csányi Balázs; died 1532) was a Hungarian nobleman, royal counselor, who served as vice-ispán of Zala County in the first decades of the 16th century.

== Early life ==
Balázs (II) Csányi was born in the late 1460s into Csányi family, an untitled noble family which originated from the gens (clan) Hahót and had estates and villages throughout in Zala County. He was one of the two sons of János (IV) Csányi (fl. 1444–75) and Katalin Hosszútóti (fl. 1467–68). His maternal grandparents were Ambrus Hosszútóthy (fl. 1440-1456), vice-ispán of Zala County between 1454 and 1456, and Helena Egerváry. Balázs' father János Csányi was a prominent familiar to the Pető de Gerse family since 1453, but later joined the Kanizsais in the late 1460s. Balázs first appeared in a contemporary document in 1475, when Matthias Corvinus, King of Hungary confirmed the previously inherited and acquired villages and estates of the Csányi family in Zala (for instance, Csány, Tilaj and Bocfölde), Somogy (Vörs) and Vas Counties (Nagytilaj). Beside the young Balázs II, the royal charter mentioned his still living grandfather Balázs I, father János IV, brother Miklós I and cousin Márton I by name. The land donation was registered by the Fehérvár monastery.

He was mentioned next time in the 1490s in estate affairs. In 1496, he filed a lawsuit against his relatives through his maternal grandmother Anna Egervári in connection with an inheritance dispute over lands in Zala, Vas and Križevci Counties. Balázs pledged the domain of Kisszőlős from Dénes Cseneházi, then vice-ispán of Zala County, on 13 October 1497. According to a royal charter of Vladislaus II of Hungary in 1498, his serfs and familiars plundered the estate of the Pauline Abbey of Örményes (today in Kehidakustány), when they were illegally hunting in the Paulines' forest. Balázs Csányi also had conflict with the Rajki family, who otherwise were relatives of his brother Miklós I (fl. 1464–1529), who married Veronika Rajki. According to a report published by the Zalavár Abbey on 24 July 1499, László Sárkány de Rajk complained that his relative Ferenc plundered his lands in Hahót and Buzádsziget (or Sárkánysziget), while Balázs Csányi did not return the occupied estate of Tormafölde and its related movable property. Finally, in 1500, Csányi entered into an arrangement with his relative, the famous lawyer Detre Rajki to mutually withdraw their legal actions.

== Career ==
Csányi started his political career as a member of the royal court of Vladislaus II, first mentioned in this capacity in 1500. He served as one of the concurrent vice-ispáns of Zala County from 1500 to 1501. In this regard, he first appeared in contemporary documents on 6 April 1500, alongside Illés Terjék de Szenterzsébet. In 1504 and 1506, he was mentioned as the appointed tax-collector (dicator) of the county, alongside Ferenc Sárkány de Ákosháza. Along with co-envoys György Kerecsenyi and András Kaczor de Lak, he represented Zala County in the Diet of Rákos (1505), where the delegates passed a bill which prohibited the election of a foreigner as king if Vladislaus's died without a male issue. According to a charter, Csányi and his companions requested a copy of the document from Judge royal Peter Szentgyörgyi de Bazin. By that time, he has gained considerable wealth, as the "nobles of Zala County" (i.e. generalis congregatio, the county assembly) borrowed him 1,100 florin to establish and equip militia portalis in 1506.

According to historian Irén Bilkei, Csányi again served as vice-ispán of Zala County in 1511, but his name did not appear in archontological lists in that year. He was appointed juror during a trial by the general assembly which sentenced "proscribed" nobles in 1512. As a tax registration from 1513 preserved, Csányi had seven porta (or peasant household) and resided in Csány in a stone-built manor house, which later was enlarged to a fortress by his son Ákos in the middle of the 16th century. An Italian cartographer and military engineer Giulio Turco depicted the ground plan of the fort in a drawing in 1569, among other castles and strongholds. The maps are displayed in the Kriegsarchiv of Vienna. However, Balázs Csányi himself did not hold any castle.

Alongside Detre Rajki, he was referred to as "the king's man" in 1516 during an investigation of a suspected violation of law by Tamás Pető de Gerse. In the same year, as one of the representatives of the lesser nobility (the so-called noble jurors), Csányi was elected to the royal council of the young Louis II of Hungary, who ascended the throne shortly before. Louis reaffirmed the land donations to the Csányi family upon Balázs' request. Csányi served as envoy of Zala County at the Diet of Bács in 1518 (today Bač, Serbia). He was again mentioned as a noble juror of the royal council in 1519. In 1520, Miklós Kapornay, Abbot of Zalavár wrote in his document that Csányi guaranteed the debt payment of the abbey to László and István Terjék, in exchange for the collateral of Zalavár domain. On 3 July 1520, King Louis II commissioned Csányi, among others, to investigate the report of the Buda Chapter, which complained that László Kanizsai's soldiers attacked its serfs in the chapel estates of Karos and Galambok. From 17 September 1520 to 1527, Csányi served as vice-ispán of Zala County for the second (or third) time. Meanwhile, he functioned as ispán (or head) of the chamber of salt in Transylvania in 1523, as his own charter claimed. He held that position, when his relative, the influential Zsigmond Pogány de Cséb held the dignity of ispán of chamber of salt in Máramaros (today Maramureș, Romania).

Csányi did not participate in the Battle of Mohács, where his relatives, Ambrus Sárkány and Zsigmond Pogány were killed. He held the office of vice-ispán of Zala County until 1527. In that year, he represented his county alongside István Gyulafi and Dénes Háshágyi at the Diet of Buda which was convened by John Zápolya. Following that Csányi gradually retired from public life. On 1 January 1529, he bought lands in Alsókustán from local noble László Hollósi. A county dicalis of 1531 listed Csányi's property: 12 portas in Csány and 16 portas in Vindornyaszőlős. In his last years, he was familiar to the powerful Nádasdy family alongside his brother and sons. According to an undated letter of his son Ákos to his lord Tamás Nádasdy, his father Balázs Csányi and two of his brothers, István and Gergely died of a plague which had broken out following the Ottoman campaign and the Siege of Kőszeg in the summer of 1532.

== Family ==
Based on a document of fragmentary genealogical data from the early 16th century, Irén Bilkei claimed that Csányi married an unidentified lady from the Sárkány de Ákosháza family. A possession agreement in Somogy County from 1515 preserved his sons' names: Miklós, István, János, Gergely and Ákos. Two of them István and Gergely died of plague in 1532. János (V) was never mentioned again. Ákos, whose collection of 500 letters to Tamás Nádasdy is one of the most important primary sources of the 16th-century Hungarian history, married Anna Sitkey, they had a daughter Orsolya. Later members of the Csányi family descended from Miklós II (fl. 1500–41), who married Lúcia Maráczy. Balázs Csányi also had daughters: Margit married John Háshágyi, as a document of 1554 from a Place of authentication recorded. His other unidentified daughter was the mother of Jakab Zele de Szentbalázs, head of the court of Tamás Nádasdy in Kanizsa.

At the county assembly of 9 December 1524, his niece Orsolya (daughter of Miklós I Csányi and Veronika Rajki) filed a lawsuit against him for her mother's dowry and morning-gift. During the trial, the property of Csány, Tilaj, Erdőhát e.g. were involved. There was a second trial in 1528 on the occasion of the last will and testament of Miklós I between Balázs and Orsolya Csányi (who, by then, married Gáspár Terjék).

== Sources ==
- Bilkei, Irén (2016). "Egy Jagelló-kori zalai alispán, Csányi Balázs és rokoni kapcsolatai a késő-középkorban [Balázs Csányi, a Vice-Ispán of Zala County from the Jagiellonian Era, and his Family Relationships in the Late Middle Ages]". In Bilkei, Irén (ed.). Zalai évszázadok. Tanulmányok és dokumentumok Zala megye történetéhez (in Hungarian). MNL Zala Megyei Levéltára. pp. 7–20. ISBN 978-963-7226-84-7.
- Kubinyi, András (1984). "A királyi tanács köznemesi ülnökei a Jagelló-korban [The Noble Jurors of the Royal Council in the Jagiellonian Era]". In H. Balázs, Éva; Fügedi, Erik; Maksay, Ferenc (eds.). Mályusz Elemér emlékkönyv. Társadalom- és művelődéstörténeti tanulmányok (in Hungarian). Akadémiai Kiadó. pp. 257–268. ISBN 963-05-3272-7.
- Molnár, András, ed. (2000). Zala megye archontológiája, 1138–2000 [Archontology of Zala County, 1138–2000] (in Hungarian). Zalai Gyűjtemény 50., Zala Megyei Levéltár. ISBN 963-7226-397.
