= Csányi =

Csányi is a Hungarian noble surname of Csányi family. Notable people with this surname include:

- Ákos Csányi (died between 1568 and 1575), Hungarian nobleman and soldier
- Balázs Csányi (1460s–1532), Hungarian nobleman and royal counselor
- Bernát Csányi (disambiguation), multiple people
- György Csányi (athlete) (1922–1978), Hungarian athlete
- György Csányi (politician), Hungarian politician and official
- Karol Csányi (born 1991), Slovak-Hungarian ice hockey player
- Márton Csányi, Hungarian jurist
- Sándor Csányi (disambiguation), multiple people
- Valéria Csányi (born 1958), Hungarian conductor
- Zoltán Csányi (1912–1993), Hungarian athlete
