= Csányi family =

House of Csányi
- Parent house: gens Hahót
- Country: Kingdom of Hungary
- Founded: 1325
- Founder: Csák I
- Final ruler: Ladislaus IV
- Dissolution: 1849

The Csányi family or Csány was a noble family in the Kingdom of Hungary, which first appeared in the early 14th century and had estates and villages mostly in Zala County.

== History ==
The Csányi family originated from the notable gens Hahót. According to the fourteenth-century chronicle composition, the founder of the kindred, knight Hahold descended from the Counts of Orlamünde, arriving to Hungary in 1163 upon the invitation of Stephen III to help to defeat the rebelled Csák kindred. Hahold's great-grandson Csák I was one of the most influential members of the kindred. He built the fort of Csáktornya (today Čakovec, Croatia) in the late 1250s. However Ottokar II of Bohemia then the increasing powerful Kőszegi family captured the clan's all castles in the following years, causing the Buzád branch's move into Center Zala. Csák II settled down in Csány (today Zalacsány) after Ottokar's invasion, possibly he was that family member who built the local Zsidóvár ("Zsidó Castle"). The Csányi family (lit. "of Csány") ascended from there. Csák III was first referred to as "Csányi" ("Chaak de Chan") in a charter of 1325 by Elizabeth of Poland, Queen of Hungary, thus he was considered as the first member of the family (Csák I Csányi in genealogical sense after that).

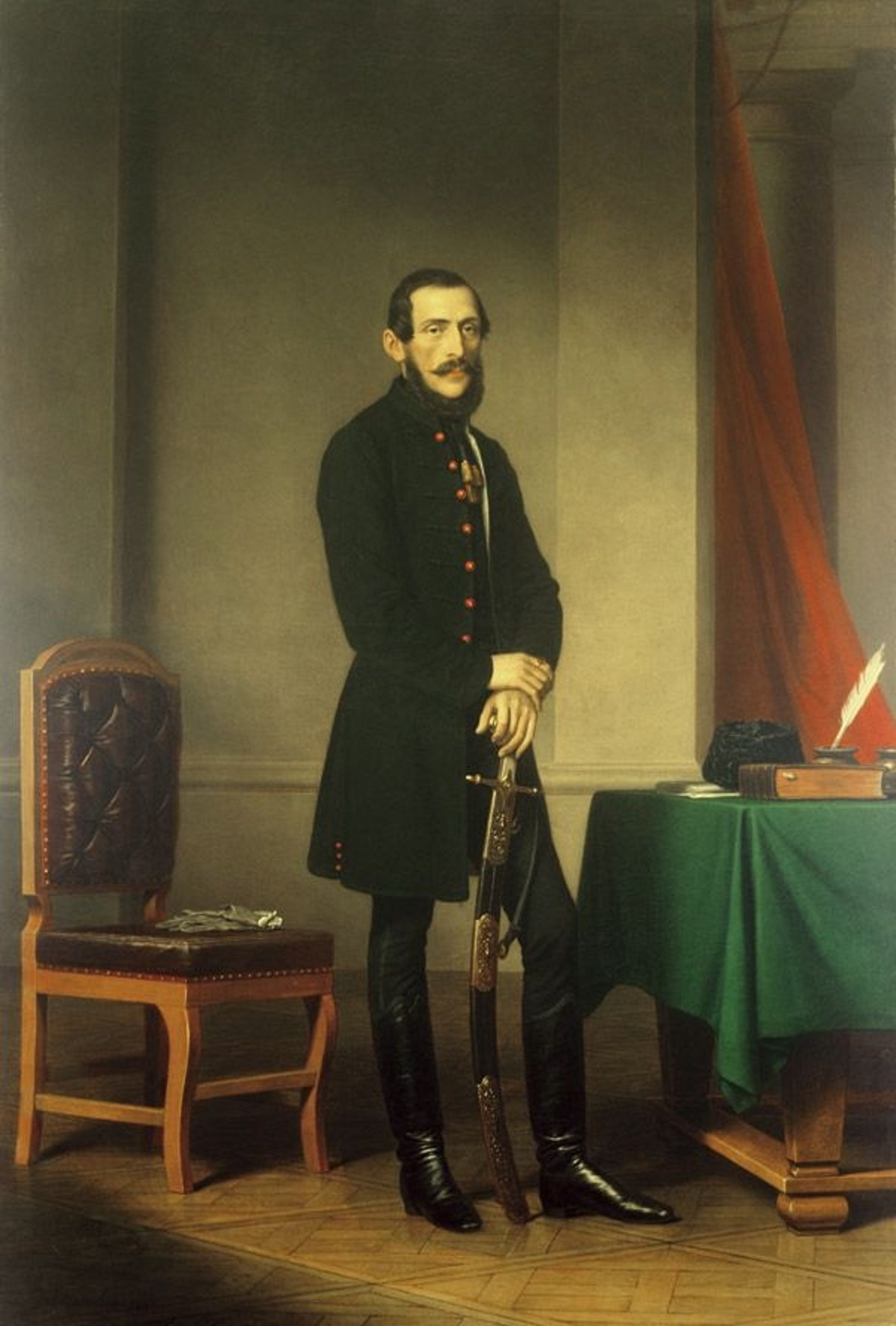
The portrait of László Csány, last member of the family

Csák I had two sons Egidius and Peter, both were first mentioned in 1348. The living members of the Csányi family (Csák's two sons and four grandsons) were among those Hahót kinships (also including the Söjtöris and Szabaris) who protested against that after a praefectio in filium by her father Nicholas V (or Nicholas Hahóti, a cousin of Csák III) in 1365, Klara granted the village of Buzádsziget. After a court decision they forced to hand over their property in Buzádsziget and Hahót to her. In the following decades, the family was only sporadically mentioned by contemporary records. In 1419, it was reported that Csák II Csányi's soldiers looted the Pető de Gerse family's serfs on their way to Vasvár. In the same year Sigismund of Luxemburg referred to Csák II and Blaise I as "royal men". The two nobles had several conflicts with the Pető de Gerse family over the next years. However, Blaise I's son John IV appeared as a prominent familiar to the Pető de Gerse family either in 1453 and 1459. However, by 1468, he belonged to the household of the powerful Kanizsai family, which dominated the politics of Zala County until the end of the 15th century.

Matthias Corvinus, King of Hungary confirmed the previously inherited and acquired villages and estates of the Csányi family in Zala, Somogy and Vas Counties in 1475. The first notable member of the Csányis was Blaise II, son of John IV. By the early 16th century, he has gained considerable wealth and rose among the leading noble families in Zala County. He served as vice-ispán of the county from 1500 to 1501 and from 1520 to 1527, and was elected to the royal council as one of the noble jurors. He retained his influence even after the Battle of Mohács. After the extinction of the Kanizsai family, the Csányis became familiars of Tamás Nádasdy who inherited the Kanizsais' enormous wealth through his wife. Nádasdy's steward and Blaise's son Ákos wrote around 500 letters to his lord during his lifetime, which collection is one of the most important primary sources of the 16th-century Hungarian history. The family's stone-built manor house in Zalacsány was enlarged to a fortress by him in the mid-16th century. Among Blaise II's sons only Nicholas II had legitimate male heirs, the later members of the family descended from him. Several members throughout the 16–17th centuries were officials in the county assembly and performed political career in county-level, for instance Bernard II, who was vice-ispán of Zala from 1580 to 1581.

The family gained land donations in Vas County too in the 16th century. A tax register from 1549 mentioned Ákos and Martin II as owners of Tótfalu (today an unpopulated area in Felsőmarác) and Nagytilaj. Bernard II's son George I built a mansion in Tótfalu, which became a seat of the family's holdings in Vas County. George's son Bernard III moved to Csákánydoroszló, where from his wife originated. He was a faithful soldier of the Batthyány family.

The birth certificates at the parish of Csány burned in 1806, making the genealogical data are incomplete and uncertain after the 16th century. The last male descendant of the family was László Csány, Government Commissioner then Minister of Public Works and Transport during the Hungarian Revolution of 1848, who was executed for his revolutionary role by the Austrian Empire in October 1849.

== Family tree ==
Ancestors of Csák III Hahót (fl. 1308–25)

16. Buzád I Hahót
8. Buzád II Hahót
4. Csák I Hahót
2. Csák II Hahót
1. Csák III Hahót; (after 1325: Csányi)

- A1. Csák I (fl. 1308–25), first mentioned as Csányi in 1325
  - B1. Egidius (fl. 1348–65)
    - C1. John I (fl. 1365–76)
    - C2. Ladislaus I (fl. 1365–76)
      - D1. Csák II (fl. 1406–33)
        - E1. John III (fl. 1444–64)
        - E2. Thomas (fl. 1444–64)
      - D2. Blaise I (fl. 1426–75)
        - E3. Benedict (fl. 1441–64)
          - F1. Martin I (fl. 1475)
            - G1. Bernard I
        - E4. John IV (fl. 1444–75), married Catherine Hosszútóti (fl. 1467–68)
          - F1. Blaise II (fl. 1475–1532), vice-ispán of Zala County.
            - G1. Stephen II (fl. 1496–1532)
            - G2. Gregory I (fl. 1515–32)
            - G3. Ákos (fl. 1515–75), married Anna Sitkey (fl. 1557)
              - H1. Ursula, married Gabriel Sitkey
            - G4. Margaret (fl. 1496), married John Háshágyi
            - G5. Nicholas II (fl. 1500–41), married Lucia Maráczy
              - H1. Bernard II (fl. 1549–81), vice-ispán of Zala County. He married Magdolna Kövér de Bagonya
                - I1. George I (fl. 1592–1630), married Borbála Perneszy de Osztopán, then Catherine Sylvester
                  - J1. Anne
                  - J2. George II (fl. 1630)
                  - J3. Bernard III (fl. 1630–64), killed in the Austro-Turkish War (1663–64)
                    - K1. Bernard IV (fl. 1690), married Christina Rumy
                      - L1. Theresia (fl. 1726)
                    - K2. Francis I (fl. 1726), married Maria Rumy, then Maria Akács
                      - L1. Bernard V
                      - L2. Anne, married Ladislaus Prosznyák de Prosznyákfalva, then June 16 of 1738 in Rábahídvég Gábor Póka de Pókafalva
                      - L3. Francis II, a lawyer in Pest, married Anna Huszár
                        - M1. Francis III
                        - M2. Bernard VI
                        - M3. Rosalia (1740-1783), married Ladislas Csertán (1734-1787), judge in Zala.
                      - L4. Ladislaus II (1704–71), judge at Vas County, married Christina Hertelendy de Hertelend ()
                        - M1. Ignatius, married in Szombathely, 1766. july 28. Anna Puchnert. 2. wife: Catharina Gaál de Gyula, daughter of Casper Gaál de Gyula
                          - N1. Theresia (from the first marriage), married John Tomasich de Novakovecz (1756-1806), geometer, land surveyor in Zala
                        - M2. Emeric IV, hussar captain
                        - M3. Bernard VII (d. 1796), married Anne Bessenyei de Galántha
                          - N1. Wendelin (1773–1809)
                          - N2. Susanna (b. 1790–1823), married John Püspöky de Lebesbény (1773-1842), Hussar colonel
                          - N3. Ladislaus IV (1790–1849), Minister of Public Works and Transport (1849), executed
                        - M4. Francis (1745–1809), married Barbara Szabó de Kisgeszény (1760–1831)
                          - N1. Julianna (1778–1847), married Emerich Gecse
                          - N2. Elisabeth (1780), married Albert Porpáczy
                          - N3. Anna (1784–1814), married Andrew Nagy de Zalapataka (1780)
                          - N5. Stephen V (b. 1790–1849), married Maria Forintos de Forintosháza (1791–1854)
                            - O1. Alexius (1810–47), chief magistrate of district of Kapornak (1840–44), married Sidonia Inkey de Pallin (1820–86)
                              - P1. Paulina (1844–84), married Ferdinand Stecher de Szebenitz
                              - P2. Melania (1845–80), married Ferdinand Stadler de Gestime, Hussar colonel
                              - P3. Karolina (1847), married Ákos Kordik (1846)
                            - O3. Maria (1816–84), married Charles Rumy de Rum et Rábadoroszló (1807–87), chief magistrate
                            - O4. Ludovica (1817–92), married Joseph Bogyay de Nagymád et Várbogya (1807)
                          - N6. Balthasar (1791), married Elisabeth Saer
                        - M5. Anne (1745–1800), married Andrew Farkas de Boldogfa (1740–1782), chief magistrate of district of Zalalövő
                      - L5. George III, vice-ispán of Zala County (1758–60), married Theresia Nagy de Zalaapáti
                        - M1. Anton
                        - M2. Emeric V
                        - M3. Martin III, crown prosecutor of Zala County (1793–97)
                        - M4. Michael II
                      - L6. Emeric III (d. 1769), married April 29 of 1756 in Rábahídvég Jozefa Sallér de Jakabháza, who was the widow of Joseph Vörös
                        - M1 Borbála, married October 28 of 1774 in Rábahídvég Ferenc Gaiger de Jobbágy
                        - M2 Terézia (1756-1827), married 25 june 1780 in Rábahídvég Jozsef Bertalan de Szenttamás
                        - M3 Anna (1759-1813), married Antal Dóczy de Muzsáj
                      - L7. Stephen IV
                      - L8. Elizabeth
                - I2. Emeric I (fl. 1592), married Catherine Eördögh de Pölöskefő
                  - J1. Stephen III (fl. 1655), married Anna Martonfalvay (fl. 1655)
                    - K1. Ladislaus III (fl. 1655)
                    - K2. George IV
                  - J2. Louis I (fl. 1655), he married Catharina Dömötöry (fl. 1655)
                    - K1. Louis II
                    - K2. Michael I
                    - K3. Emeric II
                  - J3. Magdalena (fl. 1666). married first Zsigmond Zobotin, and after his death she married Izsák Stevetenay (fl. 1666)
                  - J4. Catherine (fl. 1666), married Stephen Kerpacsics (fl. 1636-1657), captain of the castle of Zalaegerszeg
              - H2. Gregory II (fl. 1549–68)
              - H3. Martin II (fl. 1549–51)
            - G6. John V (fl. 1515)
            - G7. a daughter, possibly married Zele Szentbalázsi
          - F2. Nicholas I (fl. 1464–1529), married Veronica Rajki
            - G1. Ursula (fl. 1524–28), married Caspar Terjék
  - B2. Peter (fl. 1348–65)
    - C1. John II (fl. 1365–76)
    - C2. Stephen I (fl. 1365–76)

== See also ==
- Csányi (surname), notable people with this surname

== Sources ==
- Bilkei, Irén (2016). "Egy Jagelló-kori zalai alispán, Csányi Balázs és rokoni kapcsolatai a késő-középkorban [Balázs Csányi, a Vice-Ispán of Zala County from the Jagiellonian Era, and his Family Relationships in the Late Middle Ages]". In Bilkei, Irén (ed.). Zalai évszázadok. Tanulmányok és dokumentumok Zala megye történetéhez (in Hungarian). MNL Zala Megyei Levéltára. pp. 7–20. ISBN 978-963-7226-84-7.
- Molnár, András, ed. (2000). Zala megye archontológiája, 1138–2000 [Archontology of Zala County, 1138–2000] (in Hungarian). Zalai Gyűjtemény 50., Zala Megyei Levéltár. ISBN 963-7226-397.
- Polgár, Marianna (2015). "Adalékok a vasi végek 17. századi történetéhez. Csányi Bernát (1630–1664) katonai tevékenysége [Details on the 17th-century History of the Vas Frontier. The Military Career of Bernát Csányi (1630–1664)]". In Berecz, Mátyás; Bujdos-Pap, Györgyi; Petercsák, Tivadar (eds.). Végvár és mentalitás a kora újkori Európában (in Hungarian). Dobó István Vármúzeum. pp. 271–288. ISSN 0231-0244.
- Vándor, László (1994). "A Hahót–Buzád nemzetség birtokközpontjainak kialakulása Zala vármegyében (az alsólendvai vár keletkezésének körülményei [The Emergence of Seats of the Hahót–Buzád Kindred (The Circumstances of the Erection of Lendava Castle]". In Göncz, László (ed.). Lendava – Lendva. Študije o zgodovini Lendave – Tanulmányok Lendva történelméből (in Hungarian). Magyar Nemzetiségi Művelődési Intézet. pp. 58–63.
- Vándor, László (1996). "A Hahót–Buzád nemzetség birtokközpontjai [The Seats of the Hahót–Buzád Family]". In Balažic, Janez; Vándor, László (eds.). Ljudje ob Muri – Népek a Mura mentén (in Hungarian). Provincial Museum of Murska Sobota – Göcseji Museum of Zalaegerszeg. pp. 135–141. ISBN 961-90438-0-4.
- Wertner, Mór (1898). "A Buzád–Hahót nemzetség [The Buzád–Hahót kindred]". Turul (in Hungarian). 16: 19–33, 59–65.
