= Csány (surname) =

Csány is a Hungarian-language surname, a variant of Csányi. Notable people with the surname include:

- Elek Csány (1810–1847), Hungarian nobleman and jurist
- László Csány (1790–1849), Hungarian politician

== See also ==
- Csány
