= Bernát Csányi (soldier) =

- Born: 1630
- Died: 1 August 1664 (aged 33–34); Körmend, Hungary
- Noble family: House of Csányi
- Spouse: Anna Keczer
- Issue: Bernát IV; Ferenc I
- Father: György I Csányi
- Mother: Katalin Sylvester

Bernát Csányi (Hungarian: Csányi Bernát; 1630 – 1 August 1664) was a Hungarian soldier from the old noble Csányi family.

== Life ==
Bernát (III) was born in 1630 as the son of György I Csányi and his second spouse Katalin Sylvester. He had two siblings, Anna and György II (fl. 1630). Their family resided in Tótfalu (today an unpopulated area in Felsőmarác) in Vas County, where György I built a mansion, which became a seat of the family's holdings in Vas County. György belonged to the household of the powerful aristocrat Batthyány family. The young Bernát received military training at the court of the Batthyánys in Németújvár (today Güssing, Austria). After his father's death, Bernát Csányi inherited his estates in Tótfalu as his brother György II was already deceased by then. Upon his request to his lord Ádám Batthyány, Csányi moved to Csákány in Vas County (today Csákánydoroszló) where the family of his wife, the Keczers had large-scale estates.

Since the early 17th century, Csákány suffered from permanent plunder attacks and raids by Ottoman marauders who crossed the border in small troops from Ottoman Hungary. The plague epidemic of 1644–45 caused the depopulation of the settlement and its surroundings areas, as a result Ádám Batthyány provided privilege to his settled soldiers (hajdús), including Csányi. The local serfs were also conscripted into the Batthyány army, granting tax exemption during their service. Since 1654, Csányi wrote his letters and reports to Batthyány from the village of Csákány. Under his direction, a palisade was erected around Csákány and Szentpéter (today Őriszentpéter). In his letters, Csányi frequently requested war materials (e.g. gunpowder) and costs from his lord. Csányi also strengthened the local castellum (fort) crossing the Rába river, which was built by the end of the 16th century upon the command of the Hungarian Royal Chamber, seated in Pressburg (today Bratislava, Slovakia). Csányi complained his soldiers' incomplete and poor quality uniforms, the constantly delayed service pay. However, the conflicts of jurisdiction between captain Ádám Batthyány and ispán Benedek Bakos (representative of the civil authority in Vas County) hindered the efficient functioning of the border guard system in the Upper Őrség.

In 1658, Csányi was replaced as captain of the garrison at Csákány. He returned to Szentpéter then moved to Egerszeg by September 1658, where he was appointed vice-captain in 1660. His lord Ádám Batthyány died in 1659. Csányi was among the officers of the cavalry in Körmend in 1662. He participated in the Austro-Turkish War of 1663–64. Paul I, Count Esterházy of Galántha wrote in his memoir on war and military strategy Mars Hungaricus that a Christian army was united at Körmend in July 1664. The commanders, Kristóf Batthyány and Esterházy sent an auxiliary troop of 600 Hungarian and 200 Croatian soldiers led by Csányi and Ferenc Csanádi to attack the Ottoman military camp. After initial victories, the Ottomans defeated them, Csanádi was also among those killed in the battlefield. On 1 August, Batthyány and Csányi tried to prevent the Ottomans from crossing the Rába river at Körmend. As Esterházy recorded, Bernát Csányi was mortally wounded by a bullet from a Janissary rifle. Some historians do not accept Esterházy's report on the circumstances and year of his death, as Csányi's wife Anna Keczer appeared as widow at first in contemporary sources in June 1667.

== Family ==
Bernát Csányi and Anna Keczer had two sons. Bernát IV (fl. 1690), who married Krisztina Rumy, also served in the Batthyány banderium and participated in the Great Turkish War (1683–99), later was head of the garrison in Rohonc (today Rechnitz, Austria) and Kőszeg on the line of the Kanizsa border system. He had a daughter Terézia (fl. 1726). The 18–19th century members of the Csányi family descended from Bernát III's other son Ferenc I, who married Mária Rumy, then Mária Akács. He had at least eight children, including György III and László II (1704–71), grandfather of László Csány, a martyr of the Hungarian Revolution of 1848.

== Sources ==
- Ivicsics, Péter (1993). "Kisebb végvárak, véghelyek Vas megyében [Smaller Frontier Castles and Forts in Vas County]". In Petercsák, Tivadar; Szabó, Jolán (eds.). Végvárak és régiók a XVI–XVII században (in Hungarian). Heves Megyei Múzeumi Szervezet. pp. 289–310. ISSN 0231-0244.
- Polgár, Marianna (2015). "Adalékok a vasi végek 17. századi történetéhez. Csányi Bernát (1630–1664) katonai tevékenysége [Details on the 17th-century History of the Vas Frontier. The Military Career of Bernát Csányi (1630–1664)]". In Berecz, Mátyás; Bujdos-Pap, Györgyi; Petercsák, Tivadar (eds.). Végvár és mentalitás a kora újkori Európában (in Hungarian). Dobó István Vármúzeum. pp. 271–288. ISSN 0231-0244.
