= Rajki =

Rajki may refer to:

- Rajki, Poland, a village near Białystok
- Rajki, Croatia, a village in Istria
- Béla Rajki, Hungarian swimming coach and water polo coach
- Detre Rajki (died after 1523), Hungarian jurist

== See also ==
- Rayki (disambiguation)
