= Bernát Csányi =

Bernát Csányi may refer to:

- Bernát Csányi (fl. 1549–1581), Hungarian politician and official
- Bernát Csányi (1630–1664), Hungarian soldier
