= György Csányi =

György Csányi may refer to:

- György Csányi (athlete) (1922–1978), Hungarian sprinter
- György Csányi (politician), 18th-century Hungarian politician
