= Elek Csány =

Chief magistrate of Kapornak District
- In office 28 September 1840 – 10 June 1844
- Preceded by: Károly Rumy
- Succeeded by: Ferenc Sümeghy

Personal details
- Born: 1810
- Died: 18 June 1847 (aged 36–37)
- Profession: jurist

Elek Csány de Csány (1810 – 18 June 1847) was a Hungarian nobleman and jurist, who served as deputy magistrate (1834–40), then chief magistrate (főszolgabíró) of district of Kapornak (1840–44) in Zala County (today Krplivnik, Slovenia).

== Biography ==
He was born into an old noble family as the son of István Csány (1790–1849) and Mária Forintos de Forintosháza (1791–1854). His maternal grandparents were Károly Forintos de Forintosháza (1763–1834), landowner and Anna Farkas de Gulács (1770–1805). He had a sister Mária Csány (1816–84). His uncle was László Csány, a notable liberal politician of the Hungarian Reform Era and Minister of Public Works and Transport during the Hungarian Revolution of 1848, who was executed for his revolutionary role in October 1849. Elek Csány was elected chief magistrate with the support of his uncle against his brother-in-law Károly Rumy (1807–77).

Elek Csány married Szidónia Inkey (1820–86) in 1843, who, as a widow, had a platonic relationship with statesman Ferenc Deák, and later got married again to Géza Báthor. Csány and his wife had three daughters: Paulina, Melánia and Karolina.

Elek Csány died of pneumonia on 18 June 1847.

== Bibliography ==
- Molnár, András, ed. (2000). Zala megye archontológiája, 1138–2000 [Archontology of Zala County, 1138–2000] (in Hungarian). Zalai Gyűjtemény 50., Zala Megyei Levéltár. ISBN 963-7226-397.
- Novák, Mihály (1908). Zalavármegye az 1848-49. évi szabadságharcban [Zala County in the Hungarian Revolution of 1848] (in Hungarian). Tahy R. Utóda Könyvnyomdája.
