= Stranići kod Lovreča =

- Village
- Location within Croatia
- Coordinates: 45.1593464°N 13.7210564°E
- Country: Croatia
- County: Istria County
- Municipality: Sveti Lovreč

Area
  - Total: 0.73 sq mi (1.9 km^{2})

Population (2021)
  - Total: 34
  - Density: 46/sq mi (18/km^{2})
- Time zone: UTC+1 (CET)
  - Summer (DST): UTC+2 (CEST)
- Postal code: 52448 Sveti Lovreč
- Area code: 052

Stranići kod Lovreča is a village in the municipality of Sveti Lovreč, Istria in Croatia.

== Demographics ==
According to the 2021 census, its population was 34.
