= Orbani =

- Village
- Location within Croatia
- Coordinates: 45.1837644°N 13.7731547°E
- Country: Croatia
- County: Istria County
- Municipality: Sveti Lovreč

Area
  - Total: 0.35 sq mi (0.9 km^{2})

Population (2021)
  - Total: 20
  - Density: 58/sq mi (22/km^{2})
- Time zone: UTC+1 (CET)
  - Summer (DST): UTC+2 (CEST)
- Postal code: 52448 Sveti Lovreč
- Area code: 052

Orbani is a village in the municipality of Sveti Lovreč, Istria in Croatia.

== Demographics ==
According to the 2021 census, its population was 20.
