= Sveti Lovreč =

Sveti Lovreč San Lorenzo del Pasenatico
- Municipality
- Sveti Lovreč Municipality
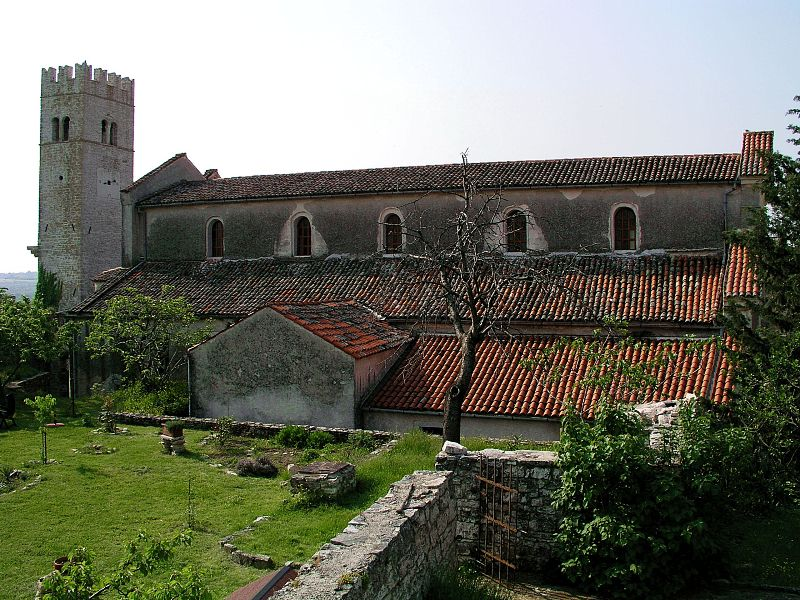
- The church of St. Martin

- Flag

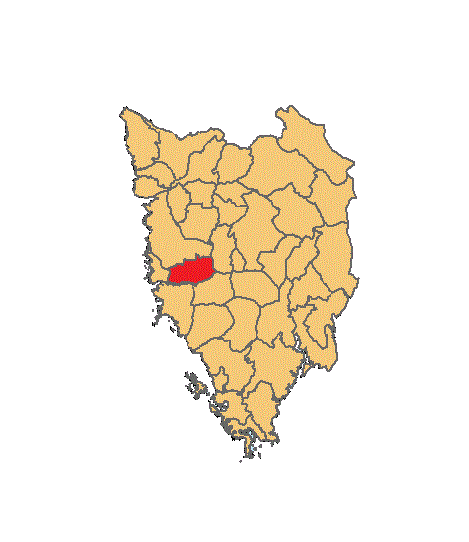
- Location of Sveti Lovreč in Istria
- Interactive map of Sveti Lovreč
- Location within Croatia
- Coordinates: 45°10′45″N 13°44′14″E
- Country: Croatia
- County: Istria County

Area
  - Total: 12.2 sq mi (31.7 km^{2})

Population (2021)
  - Total: 960
  - Density: 78/sq mi (30/km^{2})
- Time zone: UTC+1 (CET)
  - Summer (DST): UTC+2 (CEST)
- Postal code: 52440 Poreč
- Area code: 52

Sveti Lovreč (Italian: San Lorenzo del Pasenatico) is a village and a municipality in Istria, west Croatia.

== Demographics ==
According to the 2021 census, its population was 960. It was 1,408 in 2001.

The municipality consists of the following 23 settlements:

- Čehići, population 12
- Frnjolići, population 0
- Heraki, population 9
- Ivići, population 0
- Jakići Dolinji, population 25
- Jurcani, population 10
- Kapovići, population 2
- Knapići, population 3
- Kršuli, population 15
- Krunčići, population 88
- Lakovići, population 31
- Medaki, population 28
- Medvidići, population 34
- Orbani, population 20
- Pajari, population 18
- Perini, population 45
- Radići, population 13
- Rajki, population 27
- Selina, population 198
- Stranići kod Svetog Lovreča, population 34
- Sveti Lovreč, population 267
- Vošteni, population 49
- Zgrabljići, population 32
Sveti Lovreč: Population trends 1857–2021
v

population	1426	1572	1725	2046	2257	2742	2781	2960	2693	2415	1959	1565	1400	1362	1408	1015	960
	1857	1869	1880	1890	1900	1910	1921	1931	1948	1953	1961	1971	1981	1991	2001	2011	2021

Sources: Croatian Bureau of Statistics publications
