= Selina, Sveti Lovreč =

Selina
- Village
- Location within Croatia
- Coordinates: 45°09′33″N 13°46′16″E
- Country: Croatia
- County: Istria County
- Municipality: Sveti Lovreč

Area
  - Total: 1.2 sq mi (3.2 km^{2})

Population (2021)
  - Total: 198
  - Density: 160/sq mi (62/km^{2})
- Time zone: UTC+1 (CET)
  - Summer (DST): UTC+2 (CEST)
- Postal code: 52448 Sveti Lovreč
- Area code: 052

Selina is a village in the municipality of Sveti Lovreč, Istria in Croatia.

== Demographics ==
According to the 2021 census, its population was 198. It was 201 in 2011.
