= Municipality of Hodoš =

Municipality of Slovenia

Municipality of Hodoš Občina Hodoš Őrihodos község
- Municipality
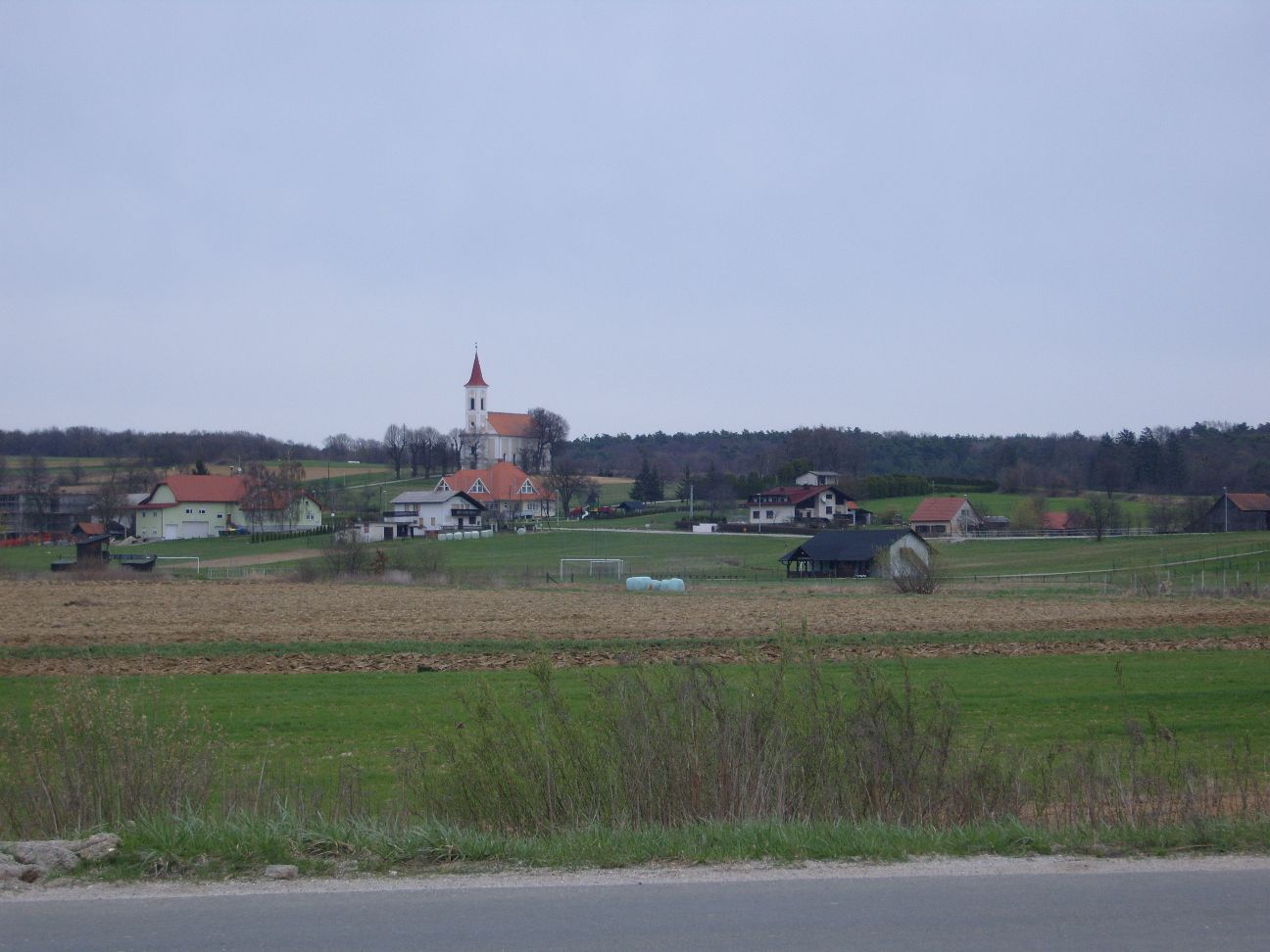

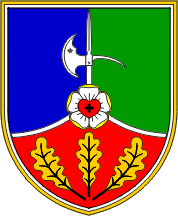
- Coat of arms

- Location of the Municipality of Hodoš in Slovenia
- Coordinates: 46°49′N 16°20′E
- Country: Slovenia

Government
  - Mayor: Rudolf Bunderla (Independent)

Area
  - Total: 18.1 km^{2} (7.0 sq mi)

Population (2010)
  - Total: 312
  - Density: 17.2/km^{2} (44.6/sq mi)
- Time zone: UTC+01 (CET)
  - Summer (DST): UTC+02 (CEST)
- Website: www.hodos.si

The Municipality of Hodoš (Slovene: Občina Hodoš [ˈóːptʃina ˈxóːdɔʃ]; Hungarian: Őrihodos község) is a municipality in Slovenia. The seat of the municipality is the village of Hodoš (Hungarian: Őrihodos). It is part of the Prekmurje region. Both Slovene and Hungarian are official languages in the municipality. The municipality was established on 7 August 1998, when it was separated from the former Municipality of Hodoš–Šalovci.

Hodoš is the smallest municipality by population in Slovenia; it is also one of only two municipalities in which ethnic Slovenes are a minority, the other being nearby Dobrovnik (Hungarian: Dobronak). The majority of the population is Lutheran.

== Settlements ==
In addition to the municipal seat of Hodoš, the municipality also includes the settlement of Krplivnik (Hungarian: Kapornak).

== Demographics ==
Population by native language, 2002 census
Hungarian: 190 (53.37%)
Slovene: 144 (40.45%)
Others and Unknown: 22 (6.18%)
Total: 356
