= Bernát Csányi (politician) =

Hungarian politician

Vice-ispán of Zala
- Reign: 1580–1581
- Predecessor: Péter Pető
- Successor: Gergely Eördögh
- Noble family: House of Csányi
- Spouse: Magdolna Kövér de Bagonya
- Issue: György I Imre I
- Father: Miklós II Csányi
- Mother: Lúcia Maráczy

Bernát Csányi (fl. 1549–1581) (Hungarian: Csányi Bernát) was a Hungarian politician and official from the old noble Csányi family, Vice-ispán of Zala.

== Life ==
Bernát (II) Csányi was born as the eldest son of Miklós (II) Csányi (fl. 1500–41) and Lúcia Maráczy (or Maráci). His paternal grandfather was Balázs Csányi, royal counselor. His maternal grandparents were Ambrus Nezdei, landowner and Katalin Maráczy. Bernát married Magdolna Kövér de Bagonya, daughter of Balázs Kövér de Bagonya and Margit Hettyey de Mihályháza. Bernát Csányi and Magdolna Kövér de Bagonya had two children: György (fl. 1592–1630) and Imre; György Csányi, married Borbála Perneszy de Osztopán, then Catherine Sylvester, his brother Imre Csányi (fl. 1592), married Catherine Eördögh de Pölöskefő.

He served as vice-ispán of Zala County from 4 December 1580 to 1 November 1581. Beside that he was also tax-collector (dicator) of the county from 12 October 1580, along with Ferenc Szili de Isebor. Alongside Jób Kávási, Imre Pete de Hetés and Ambrus Pető de Gerse, he represented Zala County at the Diet of 1581 in Pressburg (today, Bratislava, Slovakia), between 1 November 1581 and 19 February 1582. From 8 June 1584 to 16 November 1586, he was appointed tax-collector again.

== Sources ==
- Bilkei, Irén (2016). "Egy Jagelló-kori zalai alispán, Csányi Balázs és rokoni kapcsolatai a késő-középkorban [Balázs Csányi, a Vice-Ispán of Zala County from the Jagiellonian Era, and his Family Relationships in the Late Middle Ages]". In Bilkei, Irén (ed.). Zalai évszázadok. Tanulmányok és dokumentumok Zala megye történetéhez (in Hungarian). MNL Zala Megyei Levéltára. pp. 7–20. ISBN 978-963-7226-84-7.
- Molnár, András, ed. (2000). Zala megye archontológiája, 1138–2000 [Archontology of Zala County, 1138–2000] (in Hungarian). Zalai Gyűjtemény 50., Zala Megyei Levéltár. ISBN 963-7226-397.
