= Lakovići =

- Village
- Location within Croatia
- Coordinates: 45.1854345°N 13.7611405°E
- Country: Croatia
- County: Istria County
- Municipality: Sveti Lovreč

Area
  - Total: 0.15 sq mi (0.4 km^{2})

Population (2021)
  - Total: 31
  - Density: 200/sq mi (78/km^{2})
- Time zone: UTC+1 (CET)
  - Summer (DST): UTC+2 (CEST)
- Postal code: 52448 Sveti Lovreč
- Area code: 052

Lakovići is a village in the municipality of Sveti Lovreč, Istria in Croatia.

== Demographics ==
According to the 2021 census, its population was 31.
