= Galambok =

- Coat of arms

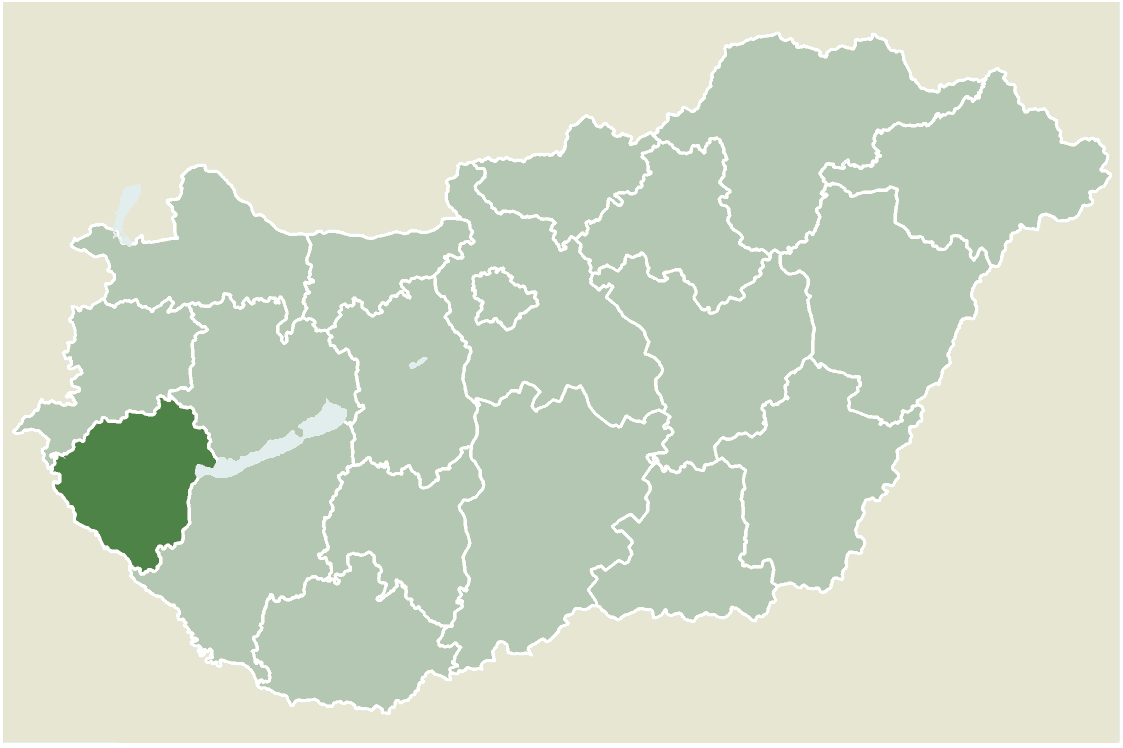
- Location of Zala county in Hungary

- Location of Galambok
- Coordinates: 46.52200°N 17.12445°E
- Country: Hungary
- County: Zala

Area
  - Total: 25.91 km^{2} (10.00 sq mi)

Population (2004)
  - Total: 1,260
  - Density: 48.62/km^{2} (125.9/sq mi)
- Time zone: UTC+1 (CET)
  - Summer (DST): UTC+2 (CEST)
- Postal code: 8754
- Area code: 93
- Motorways: M7
- Distance from Budapest: 197 km (122 mi) Northeast

Galambok is a village in Zala County, Hungary.

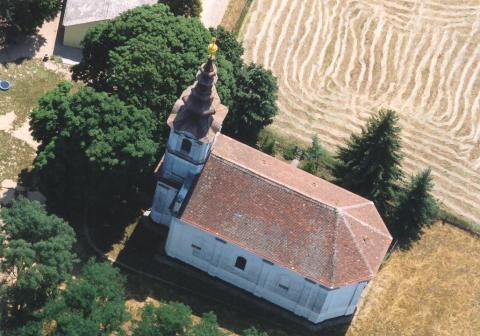
Galambok - church from above
