= Ákos Csányi =

- Died: between 1568 and 1575
- Noble family: House of Csányi
- Spouse: Anna Sitkey
- Issue: Orsolya; Mátyás; Gábor
- Father: Balázs II Csányi
- Mother: N Sárkány (?)

Ákos Csányi (Hungarian: Csányi Ákos; died between 1568 and 1575) was a Hungarian nobleman and soldier, who fought in the Ottoman–Habsburg wars. His collection of 500 letters to his lord, Baron Tamás Nádasdy is one of the most important primary sources of the 16th-century Hungarian history.

== Biography ==
Ákos was born in the early 16th century into an untitled lower noble family which originated from the gens (clan) Hahót and had estates and villages throughout in Zala County. He was a son of royal councillor Balázs (II) Csányi, who served as vice-ispán of Zala County and an unidentified lady from the Sárkány de Ákosháza family. Ákos first appeared in contemporary records in 1515, when a possession agreement in Somogy County preserved the names of Balázs' sons in the following order: Miklós, István, János, Gergely and Ákos. According to Ákos' undated letter, his father and two brothers (István and Gergely) died of a plague in the summer of 1532. Only Miklós and Ákos reached adulthood. Ákos also had two sisters.

Already his father, Balázs joined as a familiaris to the powerful Nádasdy family, which had large-scale landholdings in Transdanubia, including Zala County. Ákos Csányi was among the most prominent and trustworthy officials to Baron Tamás Nádasdy since the 1530s. Nádasdy initially joined the league of King John Zápolya after the Battle of Mohács (1526). Nádasdy and his escort, including Csányi, resided in Transylvania in the early 1530s (Ákos' family died of plague during that time). Under Nádasdy's banner, Csányi participated in the Siege of Pest in 1542. Nádasdy, left Zápolya's allegiance, and as a strong supporter of Ferdinand I, Holy Roman Emperor, acted as military commander ("captain-general") of Hungary and organized the border protection system against the Ottomans.

Under Nádasdy's command, Csányi served as steward (bailiff) of Kanizsa lordship (at least from 1549), which was one of the most important strongholds in southern Hungary, along with Szigetvár. Csányi operated and maintained an extensive spy network in the surrounding area (at Upper Balaton, including Babócsa and Sümeg), tracing the movement of Turkish troops at the border. The two stewards, Ákos Csányi and Jakab Szele supervised the reinforcement works of the castle of Kanizsa since the late 1550s. During that time the town and the castle were also in their prime since the first half of the 16th century, when Kanizsa became a centre of trade with Italy and Styria. Csányi resided in Kanizsa in 1566, when the Fall of Szigetvár occurred. Historian Irén Bilkei argued Csányi functioned as steward until 1568, when the castle became a royal property after a possession contract with Nádasdy's widow Orsolya Kanizsai. Csányi was last mentioned by contemporary sources in that year, when he appeared as an eyewitness during a lawsuit on murder charges against one of his serfs. A charter issued by the Vasvár Chapter in 1575 referred to Csányi as a deceased person. He had a daughter Orsolya, who married Gábor Sitkey, and two sons Mátyás and Gábor.

== His letters ==
Since 1549, when presumably became the steward of Kanizsa, he wrote 523 surviving letters to his lord Tamás Nádasdy, and after his death in 1562, to his widow Orsolya Kanizsai. The compilation of Csányi's letters is the third largest collection within the Nádasdy Archives, located in Nádasdladány. His reports are the prime sources of the military situation in Délvidék, along the border system which defended Royal Hungary against the invasions of the Ottoman Empire since the second third of the 16th century. In addition to military data and espionage reports, Csányi often touched the mood of the local population and the economic situation at the borders which were affected by the series of invasions, lootings and clashes.

== Sources ==
- Bilkei, Irén (1993). "Egy zalai köznemes pályája a 16. században, Csányi Ákos [Career of a Nobleman in Zala County: Ákos Csányi]". In Kapiller, Imre (ed.). Gazdaságtörténeti tanulmányok (in Hungarian). Zalai Gyűjtemény 34., Zala Megyei Levéltár. pp. 7–16. ISBN 963-7226-12-5.
- Bilkei, Irén (2016). "Egy Jagelló-kori zalai alispán, Csányi Balázs és rokoni kapcsolatai a késő-középkorban [Balázs Csányi, a Vice-Ispán of Zala County from the Jagiellonian Era, and his Family Relationships in the Late Middle Ages]". In Bilkei, Irén (ed.). Zalai évszázadok. Tanulmányok és dokumentumok Zala megye történetéhez (in Hungarian). MNL Zala Megyei Levéltára. pp. 7–20. ISBN 978-963-7226-84-7.
- Őze, Sándor (1992). "Kanizsa környéki végvárak viszonya a környék lakosságához, Csányi Ákos jelentései alapján [The Relations of the Border Fortifications around Kanizsa to the Population of the Area based on the Reports of Ákos Csányi]". In Vándor, László (ed.). Zalai Múzeum 4 (in Hungarian). pp. 17–20. ISSN 0238-5139.
- Őze, Sándor, ed. (1996). 500 magyar levél a XVI. századból. Csányi Ákos levelei Nádasdy Tamáshoz 1549–1562. I–II. kötet [500 Letters from the 16th Century. The Letters of Ákos Csányi to Tamás Nádasdy 1549–1562. Volume I–II] (in Hungarian). Hungarian National Museum. ISBN 963-7421-90-4.
