= Tormafölde =

Coordinates: 46°32′N 16°36′E

- Village
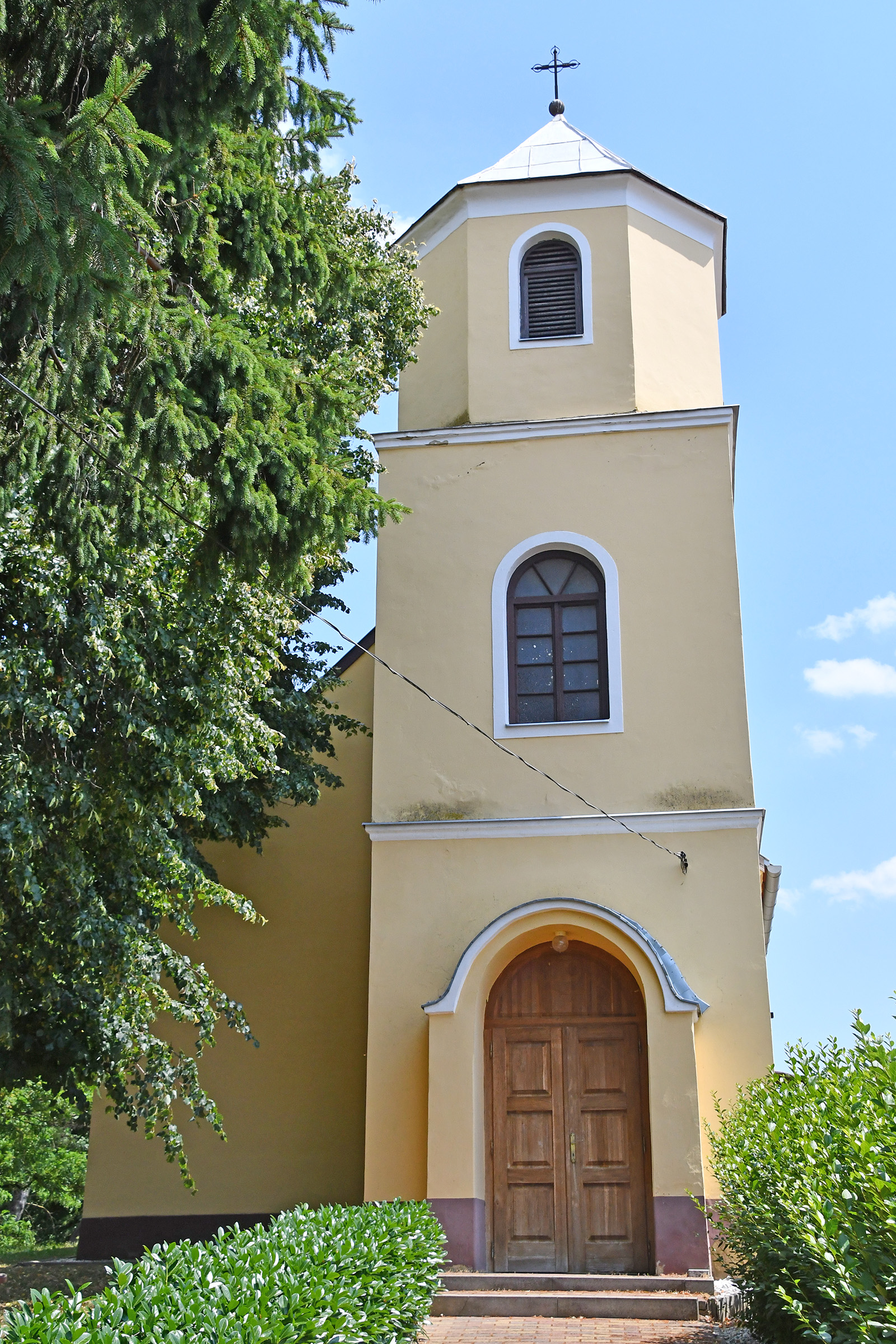
- Tormafölde, római katolikus templom 2025
- Interactive map of Tormafölde
- Country: Hungary
- Region: Western Transdanubia
- County: Zala County
- Time zone: UTC+1 (CET)
  - Summer (DST): UTC+2 (CEST)

Tormafölde is a village in Zala County, Hungary.
