= Márton Csányi =

Crown Prosecutor of Zala County
- Reign: 1793–1797
- Predecessor: Pál Soós
- Successor: Péter Soós
- Noble family: House of Csányi
- Father: György III Csányi
- Mother: Terézia Nagy

Márton Csányi (Hungarian: Csányi Márton) was a Hungarian jurist and county official from the old noble Csányi family, who served as First Deputy Prosecutor from 7 April 1790 to 10 December 1793, and Crown Prosecutor of Zala County from 10 December 1793 to 17 September 1797.

Alongside his cousin, Ferenc III, he participated in the Zala branch of the Hungarian Jacobin movement, led by János Spissich. In that years, the Zala County Assembly was dominated by the Jacobins, which frequently adopted pro-French resolutions. As a result, alongside other officials, Csányi was dismissed from his office in September 1797 by Francis I, King of Hungary.

== Sources ==
- Molnár, András, ed. (2000). Zala megye archontológiája, 1138–2000 [Archontology of Zala County, 1138–2000] (in Hungarian). Zalai Gyűjtemény 50., Zala Megyei Levéltár. ISBN 963-7226-397.
- Poór, Ferenc (1972). "A közigazgatási nyelv ügye Zala vármegyében a XVIII. század végén és a XIX. század elején [The Case of the Administrative Language in Zala County at the End of the 18th Century and the Early 19th Century]". In Palágyi, Sylvia (ed.). A Veszprém megyei múzeumok közleményei 11 (in Hungarian). Veszprém Megyei Múzeumok Igazgatósága. pp. 421–433.
