= Militia portalis =

The militia portalis (Hungarian: telekkatonaság), also known as peasant militia, was the first institution that secured the peasants' permanent participation in the defence of the Kingdom of Hungary. It was established when the Diet of Hungary obliged all landowners to equip one archer for 20 peasant plots on their estates to serve in the royal army in 1397. The unprofessional soldiers were to serve in the militia only during the emergency period.

== Sources ==
- Cole, Laurence (2014). Military Culture and Popular Patriotism in Late Imperial Austria. Oxford University Press. ISBN 978-0-19-967204-2.
- Engel, Pál (2001). The Realm of St Stephen: A History of Medieval Hungary, 895–1526. I.B. Tauris Publishers. ISBN 1-86064-061-3.
- Rady, Martyn (2000). Nobility, Land and Service in Medieval Hungary. Palgrave. ISBN 0-333-80085-0.
