= Tilaj, Hungary =

Tilaj
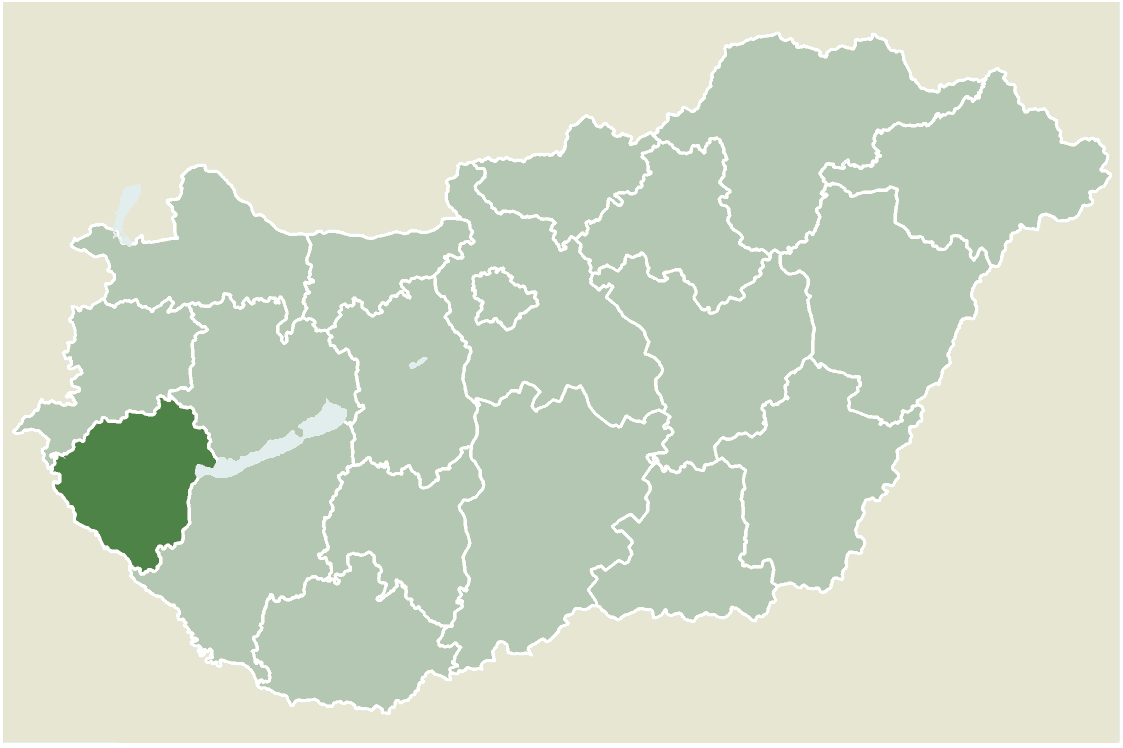
- Location of Zala county in Hungary

- Location of Tilaj
- Coordinates: 46.80427°N 17.04840°E
- Country: Hungary
- County: Zala County

Area
  - Total: 8.16 km^{2} (3.15 sq mi)

Population (2004)
  - Total: 205
  - Density: 25.12/km^{2} (65.1/sq mi)
- Time zone: UTC+1 (CET)
  - Summer (DST): UTC+2 (CEST)
- Postal code: 8782
- Area code: 83

Tilaj is a village in Zala County, Hungary.
