= Vasegerszeg =

- Location of Vas county in Hungary

- Location of Vasegerszeg
- Coordinates: 47.37160°N 16.91663°E
- Country: Hungary
- County: Vas

Area
  - Total: 12.72 km^{2} (4.91 sq mi)

Population (2004)
  - Total: 399
  - Density: 31.36/km^{2} (81.2/sq mi)
- Time zone: UTC+1 (CET)
  - Summer (DST): UTC+2 (CEST)
- Postal code: 9661
- Area code: 95
- Motorways: M86
- Distance from Budapest: 196 km (122 mi) East

Vasegerszeg is a village in Vas county, Hungary.

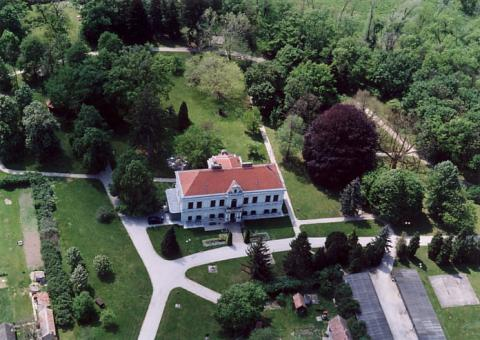
Aerial photography of a palace in Vasegerszeg
