= Vörs =

Vörs Verša (in Croatian)
- Village
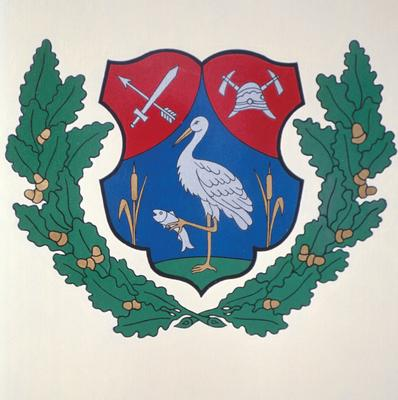
- Coat of arms

- Location of Somogy county in Hungary

- Location of Vörs
- Coordinates: 46.66289°N 17.27045°E
- Country: Hungary
- Region: Southern Transdanubia
- County: Somogy
- District: Marcali
- RC Diocese: Kaposvár

Area
  - Total: 22.65 km^{2} (8.75 sq mi)

Population (2017)
  - Total: 475
  - Density: 21.0/km^{2} (54.3/sq mi)
- Demonym: vörsi
- Time zone: UTC+1 (CET)
  - Summer (DST): UTC+2 (CEST)
- Postal code: 8711
- Area code: (+36) 85
- Patron Saint: Martin of Tours
- NUTS 3 code: HU232
- MP: József Attila Móring (KDNP)
- Website: Vörs Online

Vörs (Croatian: Verša) is a village in Somogy county, Hungary.
