= Sándor Csányi =

Sándor Csányi may refer to:

- Sándor Csányi (actor), Hungarian actor
- Sándor Csányi (banker), Hungarian business executive and banker
