= Rábahídvég =

- Location of Rábahídvég in Hungary
- Coordinates: 47°04′06″N 16°44′38″E
- Country: Hungary
- Region: Western Transdanubia
- County: Vas
- Subregion: Vasvári
- Rank: Village

Area
  - Total: 22.41 km^{2} (8.65 sq mi)

Population (1 January 2008)
  - Total: 981
  - Density: 43.8/km^{2} (113/sq mi)
- Time zone: UTC+1 (CET)
  - Summer (DST): UTC+2 (CEST)
- Postal code: 9777
- Area code: +36 94
- KSH code: 03197
- Website: http://rabahidveg.hu/

Rábahídvég is a village in Vas county, Hungary. In 2001 it had 1053 inhabitants, and in 2008 it had 981. It is settled on the left coast of the River Rába.

== History ==
Reference to the village was first recorded in 1265, with the name of Hydwegh (end of the bridge). The name was given it because of a bridge on the Rába River. The villagers were the bridge guards. In the written sources the name of the village was Terra Hyduig (1280), Hydwegh (1283), Hyduig (1286) and Hydueg (1450).

This was later the manor of the Hídvégi-family. Andrew from the Herman tribe got this territory in 1280 and his descendants took its name. In 1342 a chapel was built in the place where today's church now stands. In the Middle Ages the village also had a castle for the defence of the bridge. In 1532 the Turks destroyed this castle. In 1605 there were two battles here between István Bocskai's army and the royal army.

== Notable people ==
- Charlie Gogolak, NFL player was born here (1944).
