= Rajki, Croatia =

Rajki Raichi
- Village
- Interactive map of Rajki
- Location within Croatia
- Coordinates: 45.1670384°N 13.7146636°E
- Country: Croatia
- County: Istria County
- Municipality: Sveti Lovreč

Area
  - Total: 0.66 sq mi (1.7 km^{2})

Population (2021)
  - Total: 27
  - Density: 41/sq mi (16/km^{2})
- Time zone: UTC+1 (CET)
  - Summer (DST): UTC+2 (CEST)
- Postal code: 52448 Sveti Lovreč
- Area code: 052

Rajki (Italian: Raichi) is a village in the municipality of Sveti Lovreč, Istria in Croatia.

== Demographics ==
According to the 2021 census, its population was 27.
