= Detre Rajki =

Hungarian jurist (died after 1523)

- Born: 1470s
- Died: after 1523
- Noble family: House of Rajki
- Spouse: Rusint Tejedi
- Issue: István; Dorottya; Albert; Gábor; János
- Father: György Rajki
- Mother: Katalin Osgyáni

Detre Rajki (Hungarian: Rajki Detre; died after 1523) was a Hungarian nobleman and jurist, one of the best-known professional lawyers in the Jagiellonian Era.

== Family ==
He was born into a medium landowner noble family, which originated from Zala County, as the only son of György Rajki (died before 1494) and Katalin Osgyáni. He had a sister Borbála (or Potencia). She married Gotthárd Sitkei, castellan of Pápa who participated in the suppression of György Dózsa's peasant revolt. Detre first appeared in contemporary records as a minor in 1489, thus possibly he was born in the second half of the 1470s.

Detre Rajki married Rusint Tejedi in the early 1490s (she was first mentioned in 1495). Her father Imre Tejedi was castellan of Szombathely (1451–1474) then Győr, while was also vice-ispán of Győr County (1460–1465) as a familiar to Bishop Augustine Salánki. Furthermore, Rajki's wife also related to the influential noble families in Zala County, such as the Sárkánys and Kávásis. They had five children.

== Legal practice ==
His personal handwritten letter (missilis) from February 1496 proves Rajki's literacy. Since the 1510s, Rajki involved as a lawyer in numerous lawsuits in different parts of the country, which fact confirms his professional status. For instance, he defended the interests of the Zagreb chapter against George of Brandenburg before the court of Petar Berislavić, Ban of Croatia in 1517. He represented Ladislaus Báthory of the Szaniszlófi branch during a long-time decades of lawsuit on the question of ownership over landholdings against some members of the Báthory of Somlyó and the Perényi families in 1519. The Szaniszlófis' defense team was initially led by another famous contemporary lawyer Gergely Makrai, and subsequently directed by Rajki, while Ferenc Fancsikai represented the Perényis. In 1523, Rajki defended Borbála, wife of the disgraced Ferenc Hédervári, Ban of Belgrade (who allegedly handed over the castle to the Ottomans without resistance), to prevent confiscation and distribution of the Hédervári lands among other relatives. Rajki also represented the Eger chapter and the Székesfehérvár Convent of the Knights of St. John of Jerusalem in 1519 and 1520, respectively.

== Sources ==
- Tordai, György (1989). "Egy Jagelló-kori köznemes rokonsága és pályája /Szempontok a Jagelló-kori ügyvédség történetéhez/ [A Nobleman's Relations and Career in the Jagiellonian Era /Viewpoints to the History of Legal Profession in the Jagiellonian Era/]". In Somfai, Balázs (ed.). A Dunántúl településtörténete VII. Falvak, várak és puszták a Dunántúlon (XI–XIX. század) (in Hungarian). Hungarian Academy of Sciences. pp. 333–342. ISBN 963-7121-16-1.
