= Krplivnik =

Krplivnik Kapornak
- Location in Slovenia
- Coordinates: 46°48′39.74″N 16°19′1.91″E
- Country: Slovenia
- Traditional region: Prekmurje
- Statistical region: Mura
- Municipality: Hodoš

Area
  - Total: 5.6 km^{2} (2.2 sq mi)
- Elevation: 233.6 m (766 ft)

Population (2002)
  - Total: 105

Krplivnik (pronounced [kəɾˈpliːu̯nik]; Hungarian: Kapornak) is a village on the right bank of the Big Krka River (Slovene: Velika Krka) in the Municipality of Hodoš in the Prekmurje region of Slovenia. It is separated into two hamlets: Veliki Krplivnik in the west and Mali Krplivnik to the east, right on the border with Hungary.
