= László Csány =

Hungarian politician

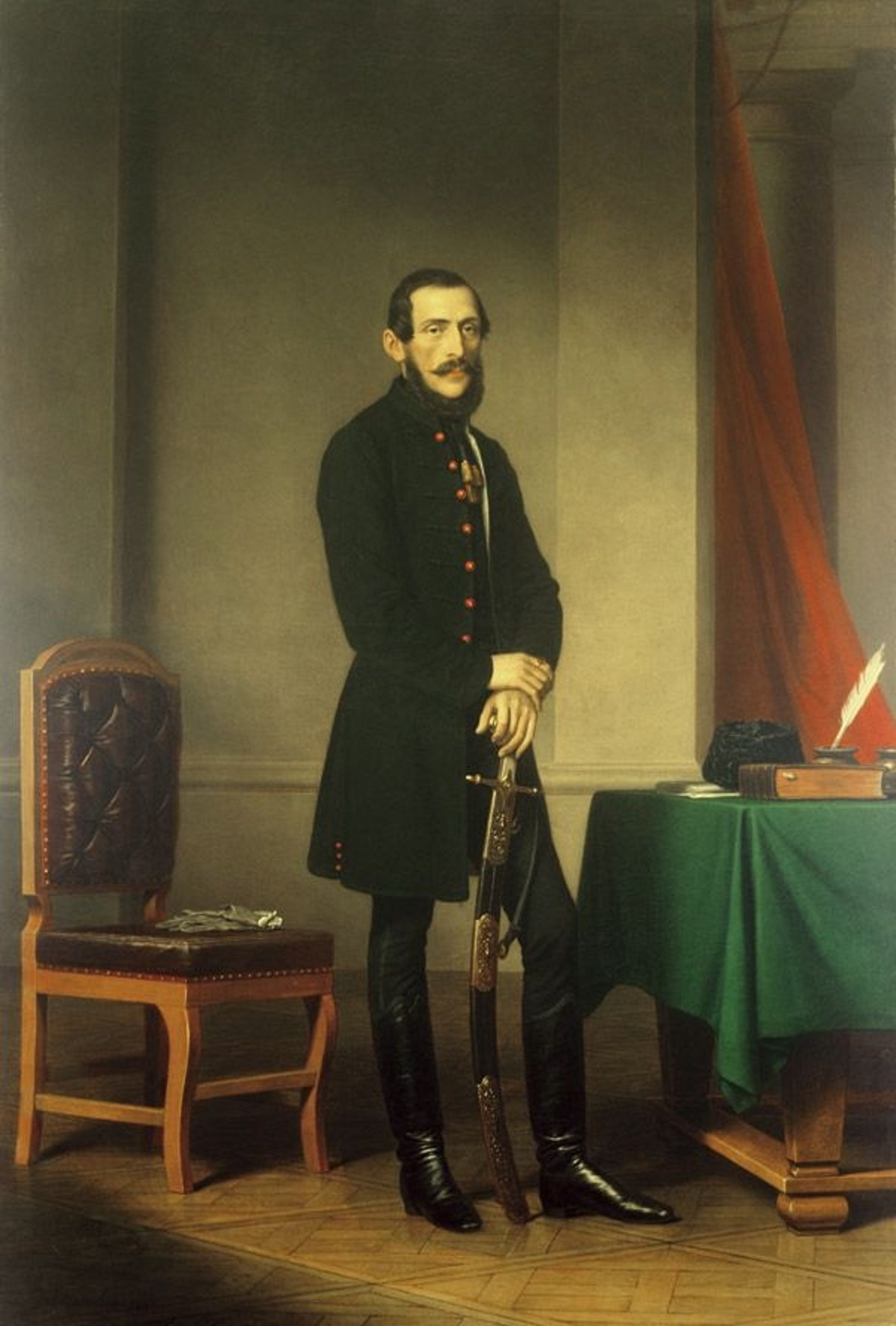

Minister of Public Works and Transport
- In office 2 May 1849 – 11 August 1849
- Preceded by: István Széchenyi
- Succeeded by: Imre Mikó

Personal details
- Born: 1790 Zalacsány, Kingdom of Hungary
- Died: 10 October 1849 (aged 58-59) Pest, Kingdom of Hungary
- Party: Opposition Party
- Profession: politician

László Csány (also Csányi; 1790 – 10 October 1849) was a Hungarian politician, who served as Minister of Public Works and Transport in 1849. He is a martyr of the Hungarian Revolution of 1848.

== Biography ==
=== Early life ===
László Csány (Csányi) was born into an old, medium landowner noble family in Zalacsány, Zala County, which originated from the gens Hahót. The exact date of his birth is not known, because the parish books burned in 1806 in the municipality. He was the fourth child of Bernát Csányi and Anna Bessenyei de Galánta. He started his secondary studies in Szombathely. He stayed in the town for a year to make the first class of the lyceum [meaning in English?]. After that he studied in Zagreb, then moved to the Academy of Law in Győr. During that time the Napoleonic Wars reached Hungary, when Napoleon's troops crossed the border at Pozsony (today Bratislava, capital of Slovakia). The academy closed its doors. Csány served as a cadet in the 9th Hussar Regiment until 1813, after that became second lieutenant in the 5th Radetzky Hussar Regiment, which stationed in Lombardy. While participating in the Napoleonic Wars, he suffered a serious burn injury, which tortured him for the rest of his life. According to a contemporary, Csány was a "thin, dry, coughed [often coughing?] man, who also suffered from chronic stomach trouble, which his doctor associated with the dysfunction of the autonomic nervous system". After finishing his studies, he joined the Imperial Austrian Army. He left the army in 1815, withdrew to his family country estate.

=== Political career ===
Csány took part in the politics of Zala County. He supported the reform policy of Ferenc Deák and became one of the leaders of the liberal opposition in the county. There was a disloyalty trial against him because of his anti-government speeches in 1838. He became a faithful and enthusiastic supporter of Lajos Kossuth in the early 1840s. He published articles for the Pesti Hírlap and was a founding member of the "Védegylet" defence society. He was a member of the Opposition Circle and thus a participant in the revolutionary events of March 1848.

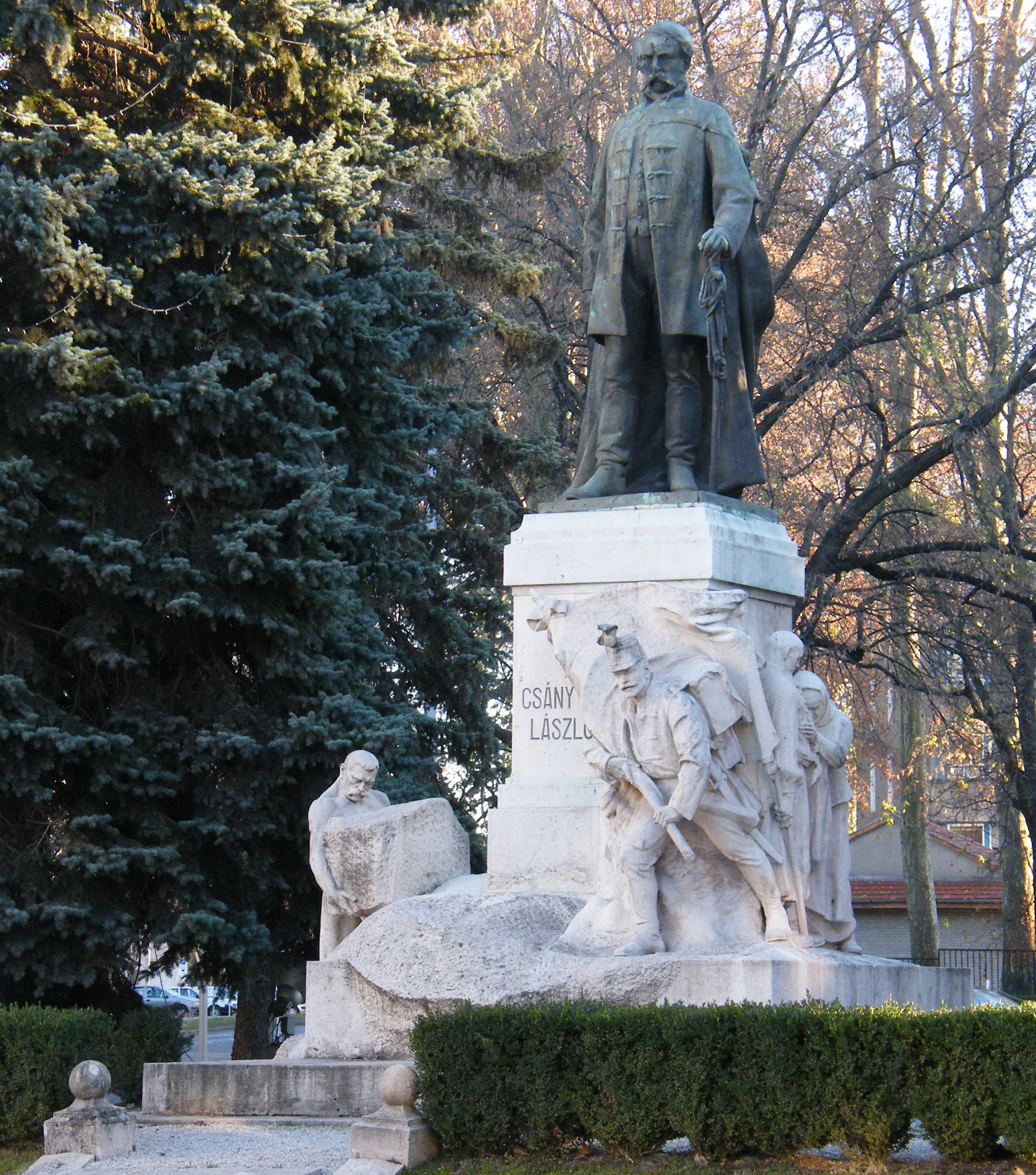
Statue in Zalaegerszeg

Csány participated in the organization of the National Guard (Nemzetőrség). He was appointed plenipotentiary royal commissioner for the protection of the southwestern border by Palatine Stephen. He was commissioned the protection of the Drava line with the 4000 armed men of the National Guard. He could not prevent the crossing of Ban Josip Jelačić, but managed to convince the officers of the lawfulness of resistance. Finally, the Croatian attack was averted.

After the resignation of the Lajos Batthyány cabinet, Csány was a commissioner [named? became? what, officer, commander?] by the National Defence Committee (led by Kossuth) in the Hungarian army, which chased the Jelačić army to the Austrian border. After that he served in the Upper Danube Army. He organized equipments and supplies of the army. He had a good relationship with Artúr Görgey. Later, he mediated between the general and the politician Kossuth.

Csány was appointed Government Commissioner of Pest-Buda on 31 December 1848. In this position, he organized the evacuation of the capital. Csány became Plenipotentiary Government Commissioner of Transylvania on 17 January 1849. He arranged the supply of Józef Bem's army from Kolozsvár (today Cluj-Napoca in Romania). He established a regime of so-called martial courts empowered to execute without trial members of the non-Hungarian ethnic groups, primarily Romanians and Transylvanian Saxons, which led to a horrific spiral of violence costing the lives of many thousand civilians. General Bem strongly disagreed with the iron-hand policies of Csány, which he put in written, considering them opposed to the spirit of liberation of the European 1848 revolution.

The relationship between the two men deteriorated and as a result Kossuth offered Csány the position of Minister of Public Works and Transport. The main aspect of the nomination was Csány's political reliability for the Governor-President, Lajos Kossuth. Csány became a minister in the cabinet of Bertalan Szemere in May 1849. He was also elected to the Diet of Hungary as MP for Keszthely. As a cabinet member, he had to provide the criteria [?] of the military transportation (steamboating and railway operation). He tried to continue the ongoing railway construction work and took the first steps for building a railway network in Transylvania as well.

In August 1849, following the resignation of the Szemere cabinet, Csány joined Görgey's army. He was captured after the surrender at Világos. He was sentenced to death by a military court in Pest on 26 September 1849. Baron János Jeszenák and László Csány were executed on 10 October 1849, four days after the death of Lajos Batthyány and the 13 Martyrs of Arad. Besides Prime Minister Batthyány and Speaker of the House of Magnates Zsigmond Perényi, Csány was the third highest-ranking civilian leader, who was executed by the Austrian Empire after defeat of the Hungarian Revolution of 1848. He was the last male descendant of the Csányi noble family, which became extinct after 500 years.

== Memory ==
- The Hungarian Chamber of Engineers established a prize, named after him.
- A statue of László Csány by János Istók was inaugurated in Zalaegerszeg in 1931. In addition, one of the secondary schools of Zalaegerszeg is named after him.

Political offices
Preceded by István Széchenyi	Minister of Public Works and Transport; 1849	Succeeded by Imre Mikó
