= Nagytilaj =

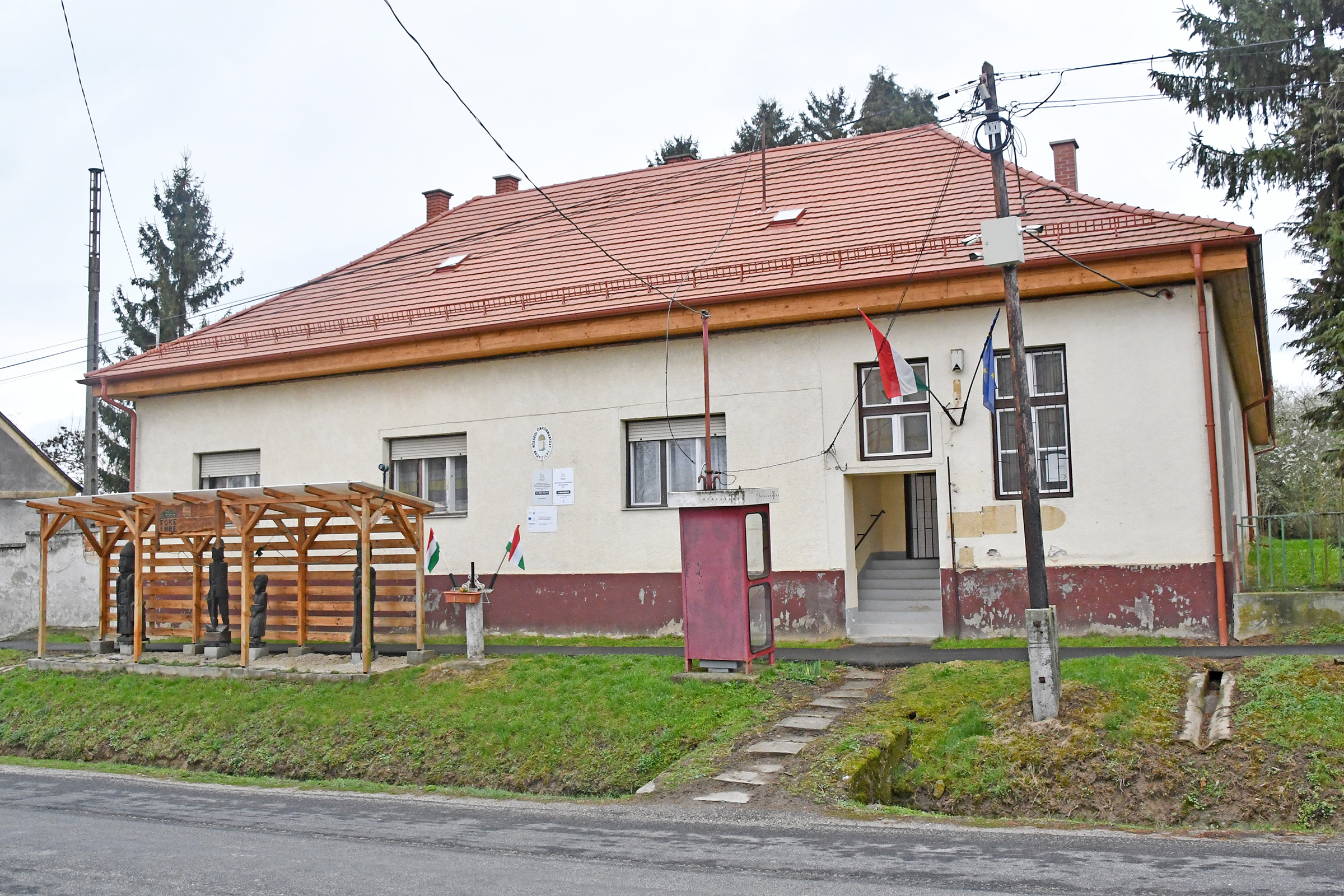
- Village hall

- Location of Vas county in Hungary

- Location of Nagytilaj
- Coordinates: 46.97732°N 16.96408°E
- Country: Hungary
- County: Vas

Area
  - Total: 15.66 km^{2} (6.05 sq mi)

Population (2004)
  - Total: 180
  - Density: 11.49/km^{2} (29.8/sq mi)
- Time zone: UTC+1 (CET)
  - Summer (DST): UTC+2 (CEST)
- Postal code: 9832
- Area code: 94

Nagytilaj is a village in Vas county, Hungary.
