= Zalacsány =

Coordinates: 46°48′N 17°07′E

- Village
- Interactive map of Zalacsány
- Country: Hungary
- Region: Western Transdanubia
- County: Zala County
- Time zone: UTC+1 (CET)
  - Summer (DST): UTC+2 (CEST)

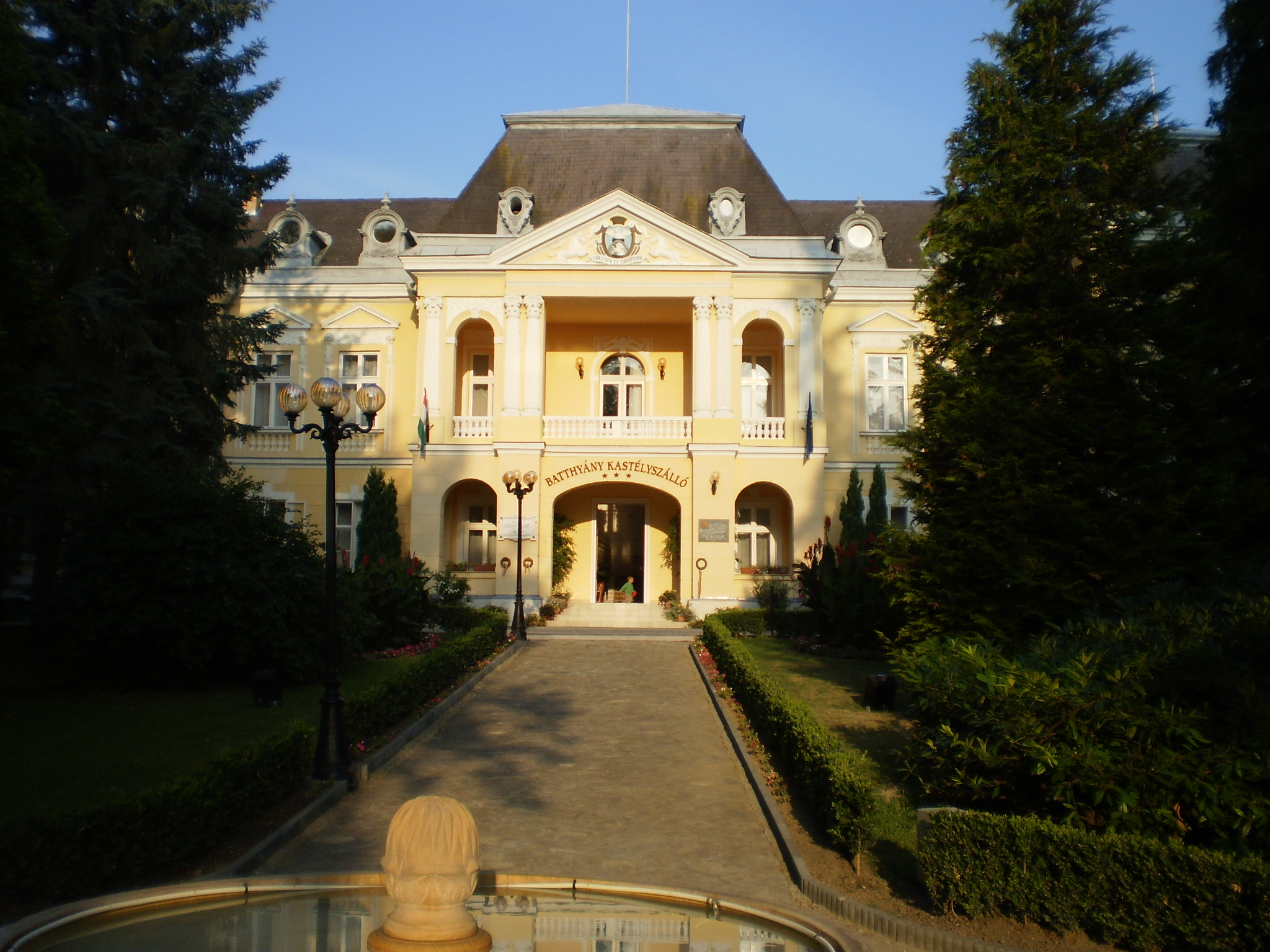
Batthyány Mansion in Zalacsány.

Zalacsány is a village in Zala County, Hungary.
