= György Csányi (politician) =

18th century Hungarian politician

First Vice-ispán of Zala County
- Reign: 1758–1760
- Predecessor: Boldizsár Inkey
- Successor: Gábor Forintos
- Noble family: House of Csányi
- Spouse: Terézia Nagy de Zalaapáti
- Issue: Antal I Imre V Márton III; Mihály II
- Father: Ferenc I Csányi
- Mother: Mária Akács

György Csányi (Hungarian: Csányi György) was a Hungarian politician and official from the old noble Csányi family.

György (III) Csányi was born as the son of Ferenc (I) Csányi and his second wife Mária Akács. He had several siblings, including László II, a judge in Vas County. György III married Terézia Nagy de Zalaapáti, they had four children, including Antal I, a Hussar captain, and Márton III, who functioned as the crown prosecutor of Zala County from 1793 to 1797.

He served as first vice-ispán of Zala County from 22 January 1758 to 9 January 1760.

== Sources ==
- Molnár, András, ed. (2000). Zala megye archontológiája, 1138–2000 [Archontology of Zala County, 1138–2000] (in Hungarian). Zalai Gyűjtemény 50., Zala Megyei Levéltár. ISBN 963-7226-397.
